= Chatra subdivision =

- Subdivision
- Location in Jharkhand, India Chatra subdivision (India)
- Coordinates: 25.05°N 87.84°E
- Country: India
- State: Jharkhand
- District: Chatra
- Headquarters: Chatra

Area
  - Total: 2,121.63 km^{2} (819.17 sq mi)

Population
  - Total: 685,694
  - Density: 323.192/km^{2} (837.064/sq mi)

Languages
  - Official: Hindi, Urdu
- Time zone: UTC+5:30 (IST)
- Website: chatra.nic.in

Chatra subdivision is an administrative subdivision of the Chatra district in the North Chotanagpur division in the state of Jharkhand, India.

== History ==
Chatra was the "headquarters" of Ramgarh district in the 18th-19th century. The renowned reformer, Raja Rammohan Roy, was sheristadar in Ramgarh district, in 1804–05, and used to function from both Ramgarh and Chatra. Subsequently, Ramgarh district became part of North-western Frontier Agency and Hazaribagh district came up. Chatra became a subdivision of Hazaribagh district in 1914. It became a full-fledged district in 1991.

== Administrative set up ==
Chatra district has two subdivisions – (1) Chatra subdivision with Chatra, Shalighram Ramnarayanpur (Hunterganj), Itkhori, Pratappur, Kunda, Kanhachatti and Mayurhand CD blocks, and (2) Simaria subdivision with Simaria, Tandwa, Lawalong, Gidhour and Pathalgada block CD blocks.

The two subdivisions are as follows:

Subdivision	Headquarters	Area km^{2}	Population (2011)	Rural population % (2011)	Urban population % (2011)
Chatra	Chatra	2,121.63	685,694	92.71	7.29
Simaria	Simaria	1,668.95	357,192	96.37	3.63

Cities, towns and locations in Chatra district in North Chotanagpur Division
M: municipality, CT: census town, R: rural/ urban centre, H: historical/ religious centre, P: power plant, T: tourist centre
Abbreviation used - TPS: thermal power station
Owing to space constraints in the small map, the actual locations in a larger map may vary slightly

== Demographics ==
According to the 2011 Census of India data, Chatra subdivision, in Chatra district, had a total population of 685,694. There were 351,511 (51%) males and 334,183 (49%) females. Scheduled castes numbered 231,266 (33.73%) and scheduled tribes numbered 9,915 (1.45%). Literacy rate was 47.92% (for the total population).

See also – List of Jharkhand districts ranked by literacy rate

== Police stations ==
Police stations in Chatra subdivision were at:

1. Chatra Sadar
2. Basistanagar
3. Hunterganj
4. Itkhori
5. Kunda
6. Pratappur
7. Rajpur

== Blocks ==
Community development blocks in Chatra subdivision are:

CD block	Headquarters	Area km^{2}	Population (2011)	SC %	ST %	Literacy rate %	NP, CT
Chatra	Chatra	400.21	101,014	37.98	3.74	55.54	-
Shaligram Ramnarayanpur	Hunterganj	513.18	187,590	37.29	0.33	54.83	-
Itkhori	Itkhori	160.60	74,929	22.37	0.42	62.90	-
Kunda	Kunda	285.08	30,018	63.57	3.85	44.84	-
Pratappur	Pratappur	385.79	120,221	36.20	1.12	53.19	-
Kanhachatti	Chiridiri	227.49	63,012	32.23	3.20	62.88	-
Mayurhand block	Mayurhand	133.28	58,925	26.22	0.36	64.41	-

== Education ==
In 2011, in Chatra subdivision out of a total 1,026 inhabited villages there were 252 villages with pre-primary schools, 833 villages with primary schools, 442 villages with middle schools, 70 villages with secondary schools, 34 villages with senior secondary schools, 3 locations with general degree colleges, 1 location with non-formal training centre, 2 locations with vocational training institutes, 191 villages with no educational facility.
.*Senior secondary schools are also known as Inter colleges in Jharkhand

=== Educational institutions ===
The following institutions are located in Chatra subdivision:

- Chatra College was established at Chatra in 1961. It is affiliated with the Vinoba Bhave University.
- R.N.M. College at Hunterganj is affiliated with the Vinoba Bhave University.
- Bhadrakali College was established at Itkhori in 1979. It is affiliated with Vinoba Bhave University.

(Information about degree colleges with proper reference may be added here)

== Healthcare ==
In 2011, in Chatra subdivision there were 58 villages with primary health centres, 86 villages with primary health subcentres, 65 villages with maternity and child welfare centres, 35 villages with allopathic hospitals, 30 villages with dispensaries, 27 villages with veterinary hospitals, 38 villages with family welfare centres, 1 location with a nursing home, 70 villages with medicine shops.
.*Private medical practitioners, alternative medicine etc. not included

=== Medical facilities ===
(Anybody having referenced information about location of government/ private medical facilities may please add it here)
