= Pratappur, Jharkhand =

Pratappur
- Community development block
- Location in Jharkhand, India Pratappur (India)
- Coordinates: 24°17′45″N 84°38′12″E
- Country: India
- State: Jharkhand
- District: Chatra
- Block: Pratappur

Government
  - Type: Federal democracy

Area
  - Total: 385.79 km^{2} (148.95 sq mi)
- Elevation: 216 m (709 ft)

Population (2011)
  - Total: 120,221
  - Density: 311.62/km^{2} (807.10/sq mi)

Languages
  - Official: Hindi, Urdu
- Time zone: UTC+5:30 (IST)
- PIN: 825404 (Pratappur)
- Telephone code: 06550
- Vehicle registration: JH-13
- Literacy: 53.19%
- Lok Sabha constituency: Chatra
- Vidhan Sabha constituency: Chatra
- Website: chatra.nic.in

Pratappur is a community development block that forms an administrative division in the Chatra subdivision of the Chatra district, Jharkhand state, India.

== Overview ==
Chatra district forms a part of the Upper Hazaribagh Plateau, Lower Hazaribagh Plateau and northern scarp. Located at an elevation of about 450 metres (1,476 ft), the general slope of the district is from north to south. Red laterite acidic soil predominates in an area that is primarily dependent upon rain-fed agriculture. Around 60% of the district is covered with forests. The district has a population density of 275 persons per km^{2}. Around two-thirds of the families in the district live below poverty line. In the extreme south of the district some portions of Tandwa CD Block are part of North Karanpura Coalfield.

== Maoist activities ==
Jharkhand is one of the states affected by Maoist activities. As of 2012, Chatra was one of the 14 highly affected districts in the state. 5 persons were killed in Chatra district in 2012, but Maoist activities, such as arms training camps and organisation of ‘Jan Adalats’ (kangaroo courts) were on the decline. As of 2016, Chatra was identified as one of the 13 focus areas by the state police to check Maoist activities.

== Geography ==
Pratappur is located at 24°17′45″N 84°38′12″E.

Pratappur CD block is bounded by Imamganj and Banke Bazar CD blocks in Gaya district of Bihar in the north, Shaligram Ramnarayanpur CD block in the east, Kunda CD block in the south and Manatu CD block in Palamu district in the west.

It is located 29 km from Chatra, the district headquarters.

Pratappur CD block has an area of 385.79 km^{2}.Pratappur police station serves this block. The headquarters of Pratappur CD block is at Pratappur village.

There are 18 panchayats and 176 villages in Pratappur CD block.

Gram panchayats of Pratppur CD block/ panchayat samiti are: Moneya, Jogodih, Chndrigovindpur, Ghordaur, Sijua, Yogiyara, Tandwa, Gajwa, Ghorighat, Humajang, Bharhi, Dumarwar, Barura, Sidki, Babhane, Pratappur and Rampur.

== Demographics ==
=== Population ===
According to the 2011 Census of India Pratappur CD block had a total population of 120,221, all of which were rural. There were 61,780 (51%) males and 58,441 (49%) females. Population in the age range 0–6 years was 24,046. Scheduled Castes numbered 43,636 (36.20%) and Scheduled Tribes numbered 1,350 (1.12%).

=== Literacy ===
As per the 2011 census the total number of literate persons in Pratappur CD block was 51,156 (53.19% of the population over 6 years) out of which males numbered 31,354 (63.00% of the male population over 6 years) and females numbered 19,802 (33.88% of the female population over 6 years). The gender disparity (the difference between female and male literacy rates) was 29.12%.

As per 2011 census, literacy in Chatra district was 60.18% Literacy in Jharkhand (for population over 7 years) was 66.41% in 2011. Literacy in India in 2011 was 74.04%.

See also – List of Jharkhand districts ranked by literacy rate

Literacy in CD Blocks of
Chatra district
Shaligram Ramnarayanpur – 54.83
Pratappur – 53.19%
Kunda – 44.84%
Lawalong – 49.02%
Chatra – 55.54%
Kanhachatti – 62.88%
Itkhori – 62.90%
Mayurhand – 64.41%
Gidhour – 68.07%
Pathalgada – 67.39%
Simaria – 63.40%
Tandwa – 62.74%
Source: 2011 Census: CD Block Wise
Primary Census Abstract Data

=== Language and religion ===
Religions in Pratappur CD block (2011)
Religion	Percent
Hinduism	83.19%
Islam	16.57%
Other or not stated	0.24%

Hindi is the official language in Jharkhand and Urdu has been declared as an additional official language.

Languages of Pratappur block (2011)
1. Khortha (35.1%)
2. Hindi (35.0%)
3. Magahi (21.6%)
4. Urdu (8.17%)
5. Others (0.13%)

At the time of the 2011 census, 35.07% of the population spoke Khortha, 35.02% Hindi, 21.61% Magahi and 8.17% Urdu as their first language.

== Rural poverty ==
Total number of BPL households in Pratappur CD block in 2002-2007 was 16,152. According to 2011 census, number of households in Pratappur CD block was 21,055. Rural poverty in Jharkhand declined from 66% in 1993–94 to 46% in 2004–05. In 2011, it has come down to 39.1%.

== Economy ==
=== Livelihood ===
Livelihood
in Pratappur CD block
1. Cultivators (17.1%)
2. Agricultural labourers (69.0%)
3. Household industries (2.62%)
4. Other Workers (11.3%)

In Pratappur CD block in 2011, amongst the class of total workers, cultivators numbered 7,833 and formed 17.07%, agricultural labourers numbered 31,684 and formed 69.04%, household industry workers numbered 1,203 and formed 2.62% and other workers numbered 5,173 and formed 11.27%. Total workers numbered 45,893 and formed 38.17% of the total population, and non-workers numbered 74,328 and formed 61.83% of the population.

=== Infrastructure ===
There are 171 inhabited villages in Pratappur CD block. In 2011, 5 villages had power supply. 9 villages had tap water (treated/ untreated), 168 villages had well water (covered/ uncovered), 166 villages had hand pumps, and 1 village did not have drinking water facility. 6 villages had post offices, 15 villages had sub post offices, 2 villages had telephones (land lines), 30 villages had mobile phone coverage. 165 villages had pucca (paved) village roads, 13 villages had bus service (public/ private), 1 village had autos/ modified autos, 12 villages had taxi/vans and 102 villages had tractors. 11 villages had bank branches, 10 villages had agricultural credit societies. 64 villages had public distribution system, 18 villages had weekly haat (market) and 54 villages had assembly polling stations.

=== Agriculture ===
Chatra is a predominantly forest district with 65% of the land area being covered with forests. The balance 35% of the area has both rocky and alluvial soil. Alluvial soil is found mostly near river valleys. Rice is the main crop of the district. Other important crops grown are bajra, maize and pulses (mainly arhar and gram).

=== Backward Regions Grant Fund ===
Chatra district is listed as a backward region and receives financial support from the Backward Regions Grant Fund. The fund created by the Government of India is designed to redress regional imbalances in development. As of 2012, 272 districts across the country were listed under this scheme. The list includes 21 districts of Jharkhand.

== Education ==
According to the District Census Handbook, Chatra, 2011 census, Pratappur CD block had 38 villages with pre-primary schools, 149 villages with primary schools, 72 villages with middle schools, 4 villages with secondary schools, 22 villages with no educational facility.

== Healthcare ==
According to the District Census Handbook, Chatra, 2011 census, Pratappur CD block had 4 villages with primary health centres, 10 villages with primary health subcentres, 3 villages with maternity and child welfare centres, 2 villages with allopathic hospitals, 3 villages with dispensaries, 1 village with veterinary hospital, 7 villages with family welfare centres, 15 villages with medicine shops.
.*Note: Private medical practitioners, alternative medicine etc. not included
