= Simaria block =

Simaria Simariya
- Community development block
- Location in Jharkhand, India Simaria (India)
- Coordinates: 24.0619°N 84.9360°E
- Country: India
- State: Jharkhand
- District: Chatra
- CD block: Simaria

Government
  - Type: Federal democracy

Area
  - Total: 512.48 km^{2} (197.87 sq mi)
- Elevation: 537 m (1,762 ft)

Population (2011)
  - Total: 107,871
  - Density: 210.49/km^{2} (545.16/sq mi)

Languages
  - Official: Hindi, Urdu
- Time zone: UTC+5:30 (IST)
- PIN: 825103 (Simaria)
- Telephone/STD code: 06559
- Vehicle registration: JH-13
- Literacy: 63.40%
- Lok Sabha constituency: Chatra
- Vidhan Sabha constituency: Simaria
- Website: chatra.nic.in

Simaria is a community development block that forms an administrative division in the Simaria subdivision of the Chatra district, Jharkhand state, India.

== Overview ==
Chatra district forms a part of the Upper Hazaribagh Plateau, Lower Hazaribagh Plateau and northern scarp. Located at an elevation of about 450 metres (1,476 ft), the general slope of the district is from north to south. Red laterite acidic soil predominates in an area that is primarily dependent upon rain-fed agriculture. Around 60% of the district is covered with forests. The district has a population density of 275 persons per km^{2}. Around two-thirds of the families in the district live below poverty line. In the extreme south of the district some portions of Tandwa CD Block are part of North Karanpura Coalfield.

== Maoist activities ==
Jharkhand is one of the states affected by Maoist activities. As of 2012, Chatra was one of the 14 highly affected districts in the state. 5 persons were killed in Chatra district in 2012, but Maoist activities, such as arms training camps and organisation of ‘Jan Adalats’ (kangaroo courts) were on the decline.

As of 2016, Chatra was identified as one of the 13 focus areas by the state police to check Maoist activities.

== Geography ==
Simaria Kalan is located at 24°03′43″N 84°56′10″E. It has an average elevation of 537 metres (1,762 ft).

Simaria CD block is bounded by Chatra and Pathalgada CD blocks in the north, Katkamdag and Barkagaon CD blocks, in Hazaribagh district, in the east, Keredari CD block in Hazaribagh district, Tandwa CD block, and Bariyatu CD block in Latehar district, in the south and Lawalong CD block in the west.

Simaria CD block has an area of 512.48 km^{2}.Simaria police station serves this block. The headquarters of Simaria CD block is at Simaria village.

There are 17 panchayats and 100 villages in Simaria CD block.

Gram panchayats of Simaria CD block/ panchayat samiti are: Chope, Pundra, Pagar, Sabano, Bagra, Srendag, Kasari, Jabra, Jirwa Khurd, Banasadi, Edla, Piri, Dadi, Ichak, Hurnali, Jangi and Banhe.

== Demographics ==
=== Population ===
According to the 2011 Census of India, Simaria CD block had a total population of 107,871, all of which were rural. There were 54,855 (51%) males and 53,016 (49%) females. Population in the age range 0–6 years was 19,129. Scheduled Castes numbered 32,496 (30.12%) and Scheduled Tribes numbered 8,761 (8.12%).

Simaria Khurd had a population of 1,055 and Simaria Kalan had a population of 2,412 in 2011.

=== Literacy ===
As per the 2011 census, the total number of literate persons in Simaria CD block was 56,262 (63.40% of the population over 6 years) out of which males numbered 32,846 (72.63% of the male population over 6 years) and females numbered 23,416 (44.18% of the female population over 6 years). The gender disparity (the difference between female and male literacy rates) was 28.45%.

As per the 2011 census, literacy in Chatra district was 60.18% Literacy in Jharkhand (for population over 7 years) was 66.41% in 2011. Literacy in India in 2011 was 74.04%.

See also – List of Jharkhand districts ranked by literacy rate

Literacy in CD Blocks of
Chatra district
Shaligram Ramnarayanpur – 54.83
Pratappur – 53.19%
Kunda – 44.84%
Lawalong – 49.02%
Chatra – 55.54%
Kanhachatti – 62.88%
Itkhori – 62.90%
Mayurhand – 64.41%
Gidhour – 68.07%
Pathalgada – 67.39%
Simaria – 63.40%
Tandwa – 62.74%
Source: 2011 Census: CD Block Wise
Primary Census Abstract Data

=== Language and religion ===
Religions in Simaria CD block (2011)
Religion	Percent
Hinduism	83.23%
Islam	13.69%
Christianity	1.67%
Sarna	1.27%
Other or not stated	0.14%

Hindi is the official language in Jharkhand and Urdu has been declared as an additional official language.

Languages of Simaria CD block (2011)
1. Hindi (60.7%)
2. Khortha (28.6%)
3. Urdu (5.35%)
4. Kurukh (1.66%)
5. Nagpuri (1.39%)
6. Mundari (1.27%)
7. Others (0.99%)

At the time of the 2011 census, 60.74% of the population spoke Hindi, 28.60% Khortha, 5.35% Urdu, 1.66% Kurukh, 1.39% Nagpuri and 1.27% Mundari as their first language.

== Rural poverty ==
Total number of BPL households in Simaria CD block in 2002-2007 was 13,863. According to 2011 census, number of households in Simaria CD block was 19,556. Rural poverty in Jharkhand declined from 66% in 1993–94 to 46% in 2004–05. In 2011, it has come down to 39.1%.

== Economy ==
=== Livelihood ===
Livelihood
in Simaria CD block
1. Cultivators (38.3%)
2. Agricultural labourers (45.6%)
3. Household industries (2.86%)
4. Other Workers (13.2%)

In Simaria CD block in 2011, among the class of total workers, cultivators numbered 17,974 and formed 38.33%, agricultural labourers numbered 21,391 and formed 45.62%, household industry workers numbered 1,339 and formed 2.86% and other workers numbered 6,183 and formed 13.19%. Total workers numbered 46,887 and formed 43.47% of the total population, and non-workers numbered 60,984 and formed 56.53% of the population.

=== Infrastructure ===
There are 95 inhabited villages in Simaria CD block. In 2011, 16 villages had power supply. 2 villages had tap water (treated/ untreated), 94 villages had well water (covered/ uncovered), 95 villages had hand pumps, and all villages had drinking water facility. 8 villages had post offices, 8 villages had sub post offices, 6 villages had telephone (land line), 34 villages had mobile phone coverage. All villages had pucca (paved) village roads, 27 villages had bus service (public/ private), 14 villages had autos/ modified autos, 19 villages had taxi/vans and 59 villages had tractors. 3 villages had bank branches, 4 villages had agricultural credit societies, 1 village had cinema/ video hall, 1 village had public library and public reading room. 43 villages had public distribution system, 12 villages had weekly haat (market) and 44 villages had assembly polling stations.

=== Agriculture ===
Chatra is a predominantly forest district with 65% of the land area being covered with forests. The balance 35% of the area has both rocky and alluvial soil. Alluvial soil is found mostly near river valleys. Rice is the main crop of the district. Other important crops grown are bajra, maize and pulses (mainly arhar and gram).

=== Backward Regions Grant Fund ===
Chatra district is listed as a backward region and receives financial support from the Backward Regions Grant Fund. The fund created by the Government of India is designed to redress regional imbalances in development. As of 2012, 272 districts across the country were listed under this scheme. The list includes 21 districts of Jharkhand.

== Transport ==
NH 22 (old numbering NH 99) connects Sonbarsha (India-Nepal border) with Muzaffarpur, Patna, Gaya, Dobhi, Hunterganj and Chatra and terminates at its junction with NH 39 in Chandwa CD Block in Latehar district. NH 22 crosses NH 19 (old numbering NH 2) at Dobhi in Gaya district of Bihar.

== Education ==
According to the District Census Handbook, Chatra, 2011 census, Simaria CD block had 36 villages with pre-primary schools, 93 villages with primary schools, 71 villages with middle schools, 12 villages with secondary schools, 2 villages with senior secondary schools, 2 villages with no educational facility.
.*Note: Senior secondary schools are also known as Inter colleges in Jharkhand

Simaria Degree Mahavidyalaya was established at Simaria in 2015. It is affiliated with the Vinoba Bhave University.

== Healthcare ==
According to the District Census Handbook, Chatra, 2011 census, Simaria CD block had 11 villages with primary health centres, 16 villages with primary health subcentres, 14 villages with maternity and child welfare centres, 12 villages with allopathic hospital, 4 villages with dispensaries, 9 villages with veterinary hospitals, 7 villages with family welfare centres, 4 villages with medicine shops.
.*Note: Private medical practitioners, alternative medicine etc. not included
