= Kunda block =

Kunda
- Community development block
- Location in Jharkhand, India Kunda (India)
- Coordinates: 24°12′35″N 84°39′19″E
- Country: India
- State: Jharkhand
- District: Chatra
- CD block: Kunda

Government
  - Type: Federal democracy

Area
  - Total: 285.08 km^{2} (110.07 sq mi)
- Elevation: 370 m (1,210 ft)

Population (2011)
  - Total: 30,018
  - Density: 105.30/km^{2} (272.72/sq mi)

Languages
  - Official: Hindi, Urdu
- Time zone: UTC+5:30 (IST)
- PIN: 825404 (Pratappur)
- Telephone code: 06541
- Vehicle registration: JH-13
- Literacy: 44.84%
- Lok Sabha constituency: Chatra
- Vidhan Sabha constituency: Chatra
- Website: chatra.nic.in

Kunda is a community development block that forms an administrative division in the Chatra subdivision of the Chatra district, Jharkhand state, India.

== Overview ==
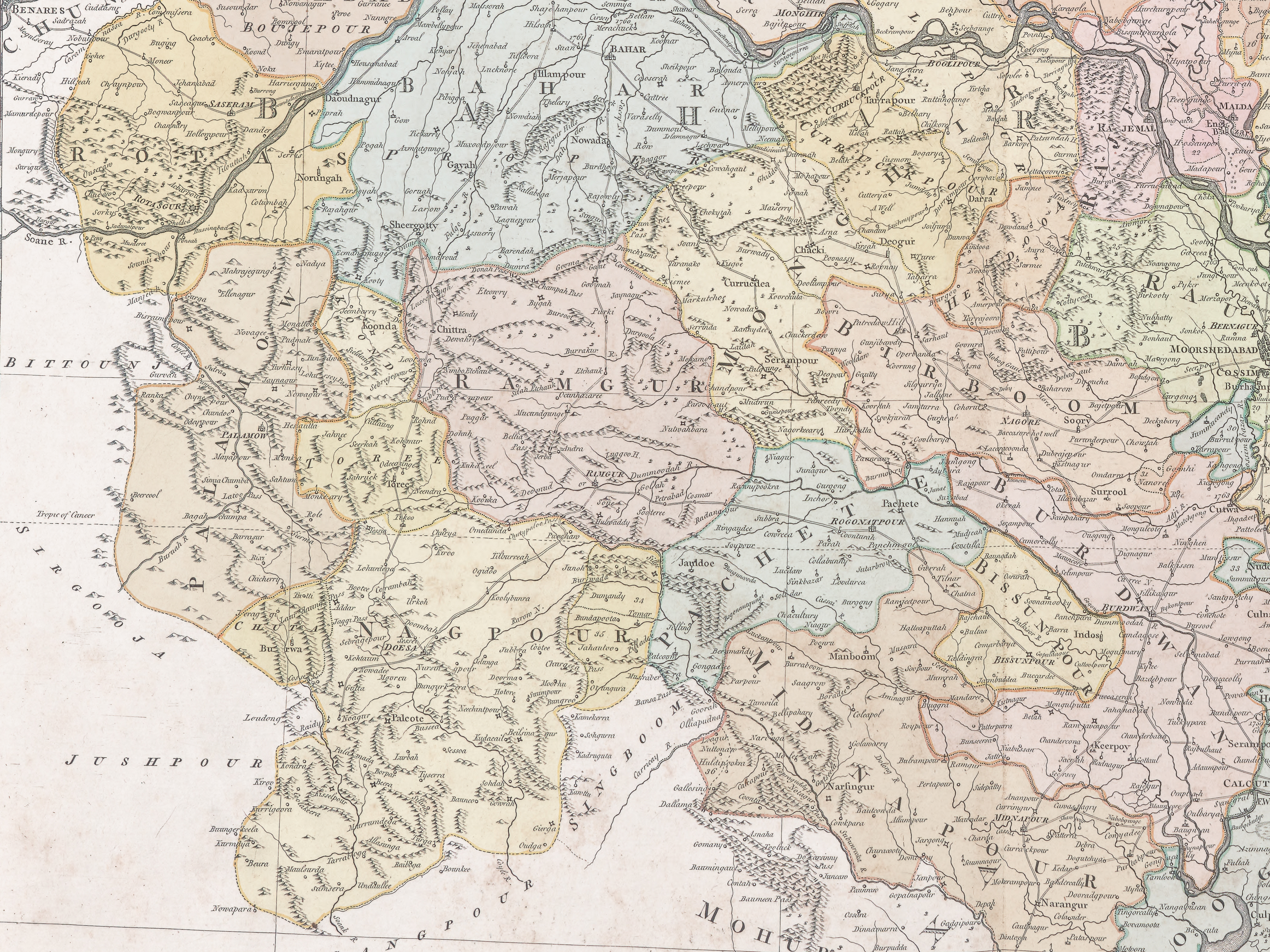
Kunda (Koonda) of Chota Nagpur in the 1770s, map by James Rennell.

Chatra district forms a part of the Upper Hazaribagh Plateau, Lower Hazaribagh Plateau and northern scarp. Located at an elevation of about 450 metres (1,476 ft), the general slope of the district is from north to south. Red laterite acidic soil predominates in an area that is primarily dependent upon rain-fed agriculture. Around 60% of the district is covered with forests. The district has a population density of 275 persons per km^{2}. Around two-thirds of the families in the district live below poverty line. In the extreme south of the district some portions of Tandwa CD Block are part of North Karanpura Coalfield.

== Maoist activities ==
Jharkhand is one of the states affected by Maoist activities. As of 2012, Chatra was one of the 14 highly affected districts in the state. 5 persons were killed in Chatra district in 2012, but Maoist activities, such as arms training camps and organisation of ‘Jan Adalats’ (kangaroo courts) were on the decline. As of 2016, Chatra was identified as one of the 13 focus areas by the state police to check Maoist activities.

== Geography ==
Kunda is located at 24°12′35″N 84°39′19″E.

Kunda CD block is bounded by Pratappur CD block in the north, Chatra CD block in the east, Lawalong CD block in the south and Tarhasi CD block in Palamu district in the west.

Kunda CD block has an area of 285.08 km^{2}.Kunda police station serves this block. The headquarters of Kunda CD block is at Kunda village.

There are 5 panchayats and 78 villages in Kunda CD block.

Gram panchayats of Kunda CD block/ panchayat samiti are: Kunda, Sikidag, Margada, Baudhadih and Nawada.

== Demographics ==
=== Population ===
According to the 2011 Census of India, Kunda CD block had a total population of 30,018, all of which were rural. There were 15,427 (51%) males and 14,591 (49%) females. Population in the age range 0–6 years was 6,839. Scheduled Castes numbered 19,081 (63.57%) and Scheduled Tribes numbered 1,155 (3.85%).

=== Literacy ===
As per the 2011 census the total number of literate persons in Kunda CD block was 10,394 (44.84% of the population over 6 years) out of which males numbered 6,699 (56.16% of the male population over 6 years) and females numbered 3,695 (28.35% of the female population over 6 years). The gender disparity (the difference between female and male literacy rates) was 30.81%.

As per 2011 census, literacy in Chatra district was 60.18% Literacy in Jharkhand (for population over 7 years) was 66.41% in 2011. Literacy in India in 2011 was 74.04%.

See also – List of Jharkhand districts ranked by literacy rate

Literacy in CD Blocks of
Chatra district
Shaligram Ramnarayanpur – 54.83
Pratappur – 53.19%
Kunda – 44.84%
Lawalong – 49.02%
Chatra – 55.54%
Kanhachatti – 62.88%
Itkhori – 62.90%
Mayurhand – 64.41%
Gidhour – 68.07%
Pathalgada – 67.39%
Simaria – 63.40%
Tandwa – 62.74%
Source: 2011 Census: CD Block Wise
Primary Census Abstract Data

=== Language and religion ===
Hinduism is the predominant religion in Kunda block, with 98.63% of the population following it. 1.03% did not state a religion.

Hindi is the official language in Jharkhand and Urdu has been declared as an additional official language.

Languages of Kunda block (2011)
1. Khortha (53.7%)
2. Hindi (45.2%)
3. Others (1.10%)

At the time of the 2011 census, 53.71% of the population spoke Khortha and 45.19% Hindi as their first language.

== Rural poverty ==
Total number of BPL households in Kunda CD block in 2002-2007 was 4,222. According to 2011 census, number of households in Kunda CD block was 5,782. Rural poverty in Jharkhand declined from 66% in 1993–94 to 46% in 2004–05. In 2011, it has come down to 39.1%.

== Economy ==
=== Livelihood ===
Livelihood
in Kunda CD block
1. Cultivators (22.3%)
2. Agricultural labourers (64.4%)
3. Household industries (6.54%)
4. Other Workers (6.77%)

In Kunda CD block in 2011, amongst the class of total workers, cultivators numbered 3,131 and formed 22.30%, agricultural labourers numbered 9,040 and formed 64.39%, household industry workers numbered 918 and formed 6.54% and other workers numbered 951 and formed 6.77%. Total workers numbered 14,040 and formed 46.77% of the total population, and non-workers numbered 15,978 and formed 53.23% of the population.

=== Infrastructure ===
There are 76 inhabited villages in Kunda CD block. In 2011, no village had power supply. 73 villages had well water (covered/ uncovered), 75 villages had hand pumps, and all villageshad drinking water facility. 9 villages had post offices, 1 village had sub post offices, 5 villages had telephones (land lines), 8 villages had mobile phone coverage. 75 villages had pucca (paved) village roads, 12 villages had bus service (public/ private), 6 villages had autos/ modified autos, 14 villages had taxi/vans and 64 villages had tractors. 5 villages had bank branches, 13 villages had agricultural credit societies, 3 villages had cinema/ video halls, 3 village had public library and public reading room. 18 villages had public distribution system, 5 villages had weekly haat (market) and 9 villages had assembly polling stations.

=== Agriculture ===
Chatra is a predominantly forest district with 65% of the land area being covered with forests. The balance 35% of the area has both rocky and alluvial soil. Alluvial soil is found mostly near river valleys. Rice is the main crop of the district. Other important crops grown are bajra, maize and pulses (mainly arhar and gram).

=== Tourism ===
The ruins of old Kunda palace/ fort can still be seen in a dilapidated condition some 3–4 miles from the present Kunda village. It was possibly built in the late 17th/ early 18th century. Of particular interest to tourists is an intriguing cave, half a mile from the old palace. Every year on 14th Phalguna/ Maha Shivaratri, there is a large gathering.

=== Backward Regions Grant Fund ===
Chatra district is listed as a backward region and receives financial support from the Backward Regions Grant Fund. The fund created by the Government of India is designed to redress regional imbalances in development. As of 2012, 272 districts across the country were listed under this scheme. The list includes 21 districts of Jharkhand.

== Education ==
According to the District Census Handbook, Chatra, 2011 census, Kunda CD block had 32 villages with pre-primary schools, 56 villages with primary schools, 16 villages with middle schools, 8 villages with secondary schools, 6 villages with senior secondary schools, 14 villages with no educational facility.
.*Note: Senior secondary schools are also known as Inter colleges in Jharkhand

== Healthcare ==
According to the District Census Handbook, Chatra, 2011 census, Kunda CD block had 1 village with primary health centre, 1 village with primary health subcentre, 1 village with maternity and child welfare centre, 1 village with allopathic hospital, 1 village with dispensary, 1 village with family welfare centre.
.*Note: Private medical practitioners, alternative medicine etc. not included
