= Itkhori block =

Itkhori Itkhoee
- Community development block
- Location in Jharkhand, India Itkhori (India)
- Coordinates: 24°17′49″N 85°9′18″E
- Country: India
- State: Jharkhand
- District: Chatra
- CD block: Itkhori

Government
  - Type: Federal democracy

Area
  - Total: 160.60 km^{2} (62.01 sq mi)
- Elevation: 386 m (1,266 ft)

Population (2011)
  - Total: 72,929
  - Density: 454.10/km^{2} (1,176.1/sq mi)

Languages
  - Official: Hindi, Urdu
- Time zone: UTC+5:30 (IST)
- PIN: 825408 (Itkhori)
- Telephone/STD code: 06547
- Vehicle registration: JH-13
- Literacy: 62.90%
- Lok Sabha constituency: Chatra
- Vidhan Sabha constituency: Chatra
- Website: chatra.nic.in

Itkhori is a community development block that forms an administrative division in the Chatra subdivision of the Chatra district, Jharkhand state, India.

== Overview ==
Chatra district forms a part of the Upper Hazaribagh Plateau, Lower Hazaribagh Plateau and northern scarp. Located at an elevation of about 450 metres (1,476 ft), the general slope of the district is from north to south. Red laterite acidic soil predominates in an area that is primarily dependent upon rain-fed agriculture. Around 60% of the district is covered with forests. The district has a population density of 275 persons per km^{2}. Around two-thirds of the families in the district live below poverty line. In the extreme south of the district some portions of Tandwa CD Block are part of North Karanpura Coalfield.

== Maoist activities ==
Jharkhand is one of the states affected by Maoist activities. As of 2012, Chatra was one of the 14 highly affected districts in the state. 5 persons were killed in Chatra district in 2012, but Maoist activities, such as arms training camps and organisation of ‘Jan Adalats’ (kangaroo courts) were on the decline. As of 2016, Chatra was identified as one of the 13 focus areas by the state police to check Maoist activities.

== Geography ==
Itkhori is located at 24°17′49″N 85°9′18″E

Itkhori CD block is bounded by Chauparan CD block, in Hazaribagh district, in the north, Mayurhand CD block in the east, Gidhour CD block in the south and Kanhachatti CD block in the west.

The Mohana flows through Itkhori CD block.

Itkhori CD block has an area of 160.60 km^{2}.Itkhori police station serves this block. The headquarters of Itkhori CD block is at Itkhori village.

There are 12 panchayats and 159 villages in Itkhori.

Gram panchayats of Itkhori CD block/ panchayat samiti are: Koni, Dhuna, Itkhori, Tonatanr, Dhankheri, Pitij, Halmata, Saharjam, Malakpur, Parsuni, Nawada and Karni.

== Demographics ==
=== Population ===
According to the 2011 Census of India Itkhori CD block had a total population of 74,929, all of which were rural. There were 37,869 (51%) males and 37,060 (49%) females. Population in the age range 0–6 years was 13,516. Scheduled Castes numbered 17,882 (22.37%) and Scheduled Tribes numbered 338 (0.42%).

Itkhori village had a total population of 7,121 as per 2011 census.

=== Literacy ===
As of 2011 census the total number of literate persons in Itkhori CD block was 41,775 (62.90% of the population over 6 years) out of which males numbered 24,276 (78.43% of the male population over 6 years) and females numbered 17,499 (47.24% of the female population over 6 years). The gender disparity (the difference between female and male literacy rates) was 31.20%.

As of 2011 census, literacy in Chatra district was 60.18% Literacy in Jharkhand (for population over 7 years) was 66.41% in 2011. Literacy in India in 2011 was 74.04%.

See also – List of Jharkhand districts ranked by literacy rate

Literacy in CD Blocks of
Chatra district
Shaligram Ramnarayanpur – 54.83
Pratappur – 53.19%
Kunda – 44.84%
Lawalong – 49.02%
Chatra – 55.54%
Kanhachatti – 62.88%
Itkhori – 62.90%
Mayurhand – 64.41%
Gidhour – 68.07%
Pathalgada – 67.39%
Simaria – 63.40%
Tandwa – 62.74%
Source: 2011 Census: CD Block Wise
Primary Census Abstract Data

=== Language and religion ===
Religions in Itkhori CD block (2011)
Religion	Percent
Hinduism	89.61%
Islam	10.02%
Other or not stated	0.37%

Hindi is the official language in Jharkhand and Urdu has been declared as an additional official language.

Languages of Itkhori CD block (2011)
1. Khortha (86.1%)
2. Hindi (11.3%)
3. Urdu (2.17%)
4. Others (0.39%)

At the time of the 2011 census, 86.12% of the population spoke Khortha, 11.32% Hindi and 2.17% Urdu as their first language.

== Rural poverty ==
Total number of BPL households in Itkhori CD block in 2002-2007 was 12,899. According to 2011 census, number of households in Itkhori CD block was 12,373. Rural poverty in Jharkhand declined from 66% in 1993–94 to 46% in 2004–05. In 2011, it has come down to 39.1%.

Note: BPL data possibly includes that of Mayurhand CD block

== Economy ==
=== Livelihood ===
Livelihood
in Itkhori CD block
1. Cultivators (32.4%)
2. Agricultural labourers (41.7%)
3. Household industries (3.06%)
4. Other Workers (22.8%)

In Itkhori CD block in 2011, among the class of total workers, cultivators numbered 8,615 and formed 32.44%, agricultural labourers numbered 11,071 and formed 41.69%, household industry workers numbered 812 and formed 3.06% and other workers numbered 6,657 and formed 22.81%. Total workers numbered 26,555 and formed 35.44% of the total population, and non-workers numbered 48,374 and formed 64.56% of the population.

=== Infrastructure ===
There are 137 inhabited villages in Itkhori CD block. In 2011, 87 villages had power supply. 9 villages had tap water (treated/ untreated), 133 villages had well water (covered/ uncovered), 135 villages had hand pumps, and all villages had drinking water facility. 23 villages had post offices, 25 villages had sub post offices, 8 villages had telephones (land lines), 63 villages had mobile phone coverage. 132 villages had pucca (paved) village roads, 25 villages had bus service (public/ private), 6 villages had autos/ modified autos, 15 villages had taxi/vans and 47 villages had tractors. 1 village had bank branch, 17 villages had agricultural credit societies, 1 village had cinema/ video hall, 1 village had public library and public reading room. 56 villages had public distribution system, 9 villages had weekly haat (market) and 42 villages had assembly polling stations.

=== Agriculture ===
Chatra is a predominantly forest district with 65% of the land area being covered with forests. The balance 35% of the area has both rocky and alluvial soil. Alluvial soil is found mostly near river valleys. Rice is the main crop of the district. Other important crops grown are bajra, maize and pulses (mainly arhar and gram).

=== Backward Regions Grant Fund ===
Chatra district is listed as a backward region and receives financial support from the Backward Regions Grant Fund. The fund created by the Government of India is designed to redress regional imbalances in development. As of 2012, 272 districts across the country were listed under this scheme. The list includes 21 districts of Jharkhand.

== Education ==
According to the District Census Handbook, Chatra, 2011 census, Itkhori CD block had 40 villages with pre-primary schools, 105 villages with primary schools, 59 villages with middle schools, 3 villages with secondary schools, 1 village with senior secondary school, 31 villages with no educational facility.
.*Note: Senior secondary schools are also known as Inter colleges in Jharkhand

Bhadrakali College was established at Itkhori in 1979. It is affiliated with Vinoba Bhave University.

Krishnaballabh Sahay High School is famous there. Land for this school was donated by Parmeshwar Dayal who was landlord of Dhuna Village. Approx 1,000 students study in this school. There is land measuring 601 katha which is used as a play ground. It was donated by a Dhuna resident.

== Culture ==
Lord Buddha is said to have sat for meditation at Itkhori. There are various Buddhist relics at Itkhori dating from 200 BC to 1200 AD. The Bhadrakali temple was built in the 9th century AD. The remnants of the past reflect a superior quality of workmanship.

There are some links to the Jain Teerthankar, Sheetalnath. In 2012, the Archeological Survey of India has excavated an ancient Jain idol from beneath of the Bhadrakali temple compound.

== Itkhori picture gallery ==
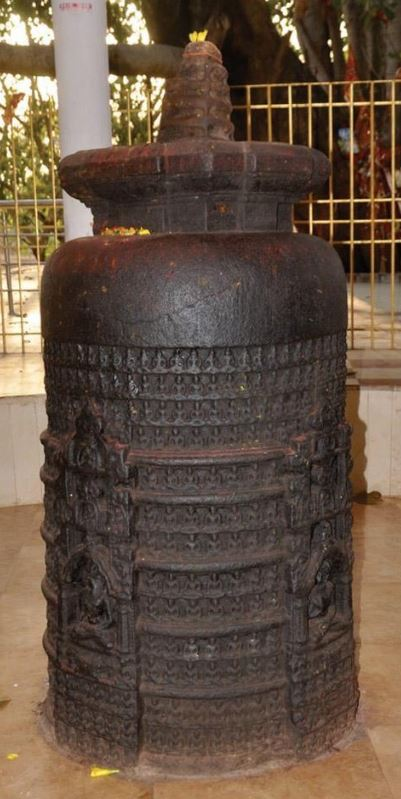
This is a stupa with 1,008 figurines of Buddha at Bhadrakali at Itkhori

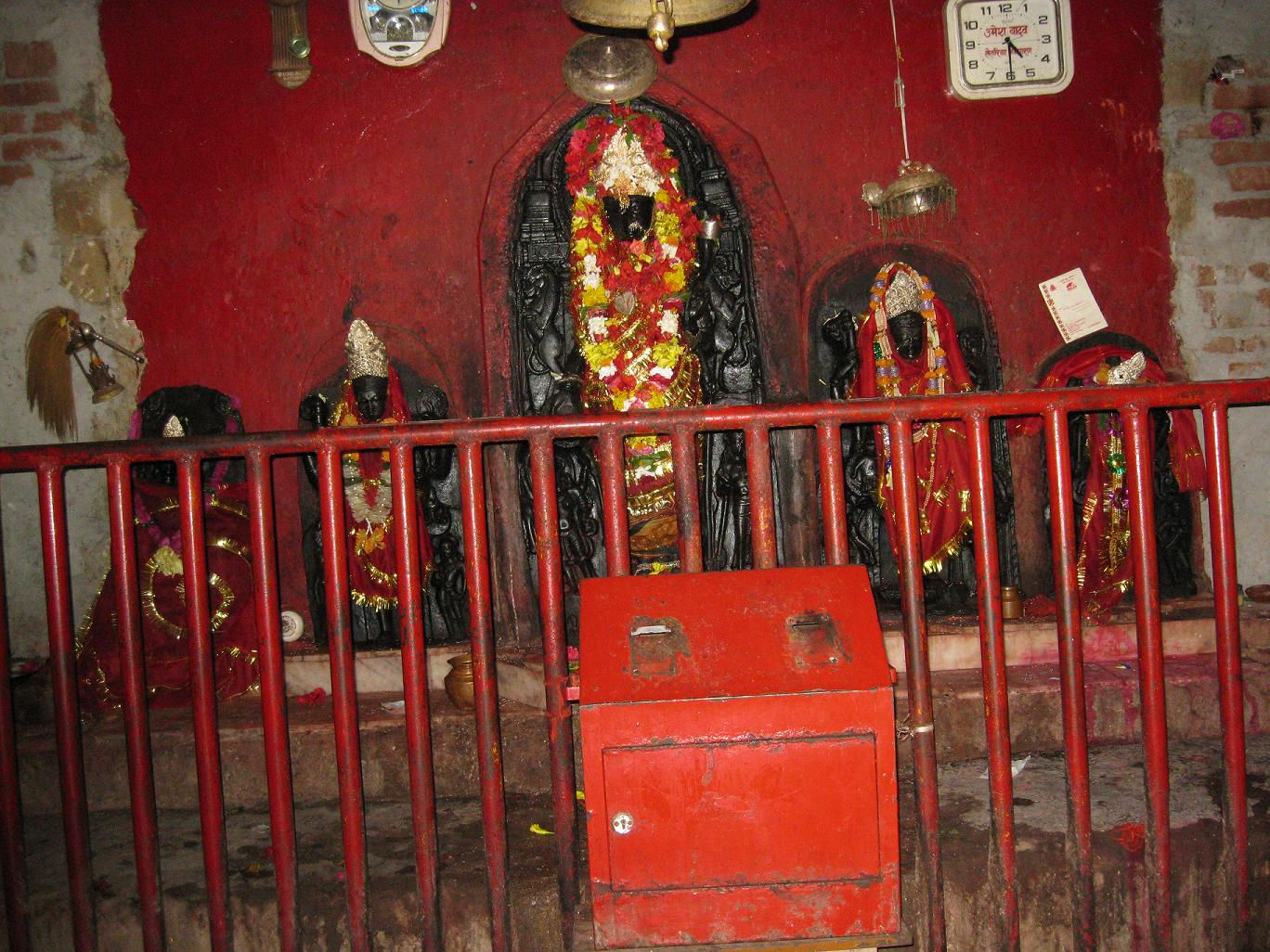
Idols of Bhadrakali temple

== Healthcare ==
According to the District Census Handbook, Chatra, 2011 census, Itkhori CD block had 13 villages with primary health centres, 21 villages with primary health subcentres, 18 villages with maternity and child welfare centres, 6 villages with allopathic hospitals, 7 villages with dispensaries, 5 villages with veterinary hospitals, 2 villages with family welfare centres, 16 villages with medicine shops.
.*Note: Private medical practitioners, alternative medicine etc. not included
