= Lawalong =

- Community development block
- Location in Jharkhand, India Lawalong (India)
- Coordinates: 24°08′59″N 84°39′37″E
- Country: India
- State: Jharkhand
- District: Chatra
- CD block: Lawalong

Government
  - Type: Federal democracy

Area
  - Total: 393.86 km^{2} (152.07 sq mi)
- Elevation: 515 m (1,690 ft)

Population (211)
  - Total: 50,553
  - Density: 128.35/km^{2} (332.43/sq mi)

Languages
  - Official: Hindi, Urdu
- Time zone: UTC+5:30 (IST)
- PIN: 825103 (Simaria)
- Telephone code: 06559
- Vehicle registration: JH-13
- Literacy: 49.02%
- Lok Sabha constituency: Chatra
- Vidhan Sabha constituency: Simaria
- Website: chatra.nic.in

Lawalong (also spelled Lawalaung) is a community development block that forms an administrative division in the Simaria subdivision of the Chatra district, Jharkhand state, India.

== Overview ==
Chatra district forms a part of the Upper Hazaribagh Plateau, Lower Hazaribagh Plateau and northern scarp. Located at an elevation of about 450 metres (1,476 ft), the general slope of the district is from north to south. Red laterite acidic soil predominates in an area that is primarily dependent upon rain-fed agriculture. Around 60% of the district is covered with forests. The district has a population density of 275 persons per km^{2}. Around two-thirds of the families in the district live below poverty line. In the extreme south of the district some portions of Tandwa CD Block are part of North Karanpura Coalfield.

== Maoist activities ==
Jharkhand is one of the states affected by Maoist activities. As of 2012, Chatra was one of the 14 highly affected districts in the state. 5 persons were killed in Chatra district in 2012, but Maoist activities, such as arms training camps and organisation of ‘Jan Adalats’ (kangaroo courts) were on the decline. As of 2016, Chatra was identified as one of the 13 focus areas by the state police to check Maoist activities.

== Geography ==
Lawalong is located at 24°08′59″N 84°39′37″E.

Lawalong CD block is bounded by Kunda and Chatra CD blocks in the north, Simaria CD block in the east, Bariyatu CD block in Latehar district in the south and Panki CD block in Palamu district in the west.

Lawalong CD block has an area of 393.86 km^{2}.Lawalong police station serves this block. The headquarters of Lawalong CD block is at Lawalong village.

There are 8 panchayats and 103 villages in Lawalong CD Block.

Gram panchayats of Lawalong CD Block/ panchayat samiti are: Rimi, Sildag, Mandhania, Lawalong, Hedum, Lamta, Kolkolekala and Katia.

== Demographics ==
=== Population ===
According to the 2011 Census of India, Lawalaung CD block had a total population of 50,553, all of which were rural. There were 25,651 (51%) males and 24,902 (49%) females. Population in the age range 0–6 years was 10,669. Scheduled Castes numbered 28,926 (57.22%) and Scheduled Tribes numbered 2,690 (5.32%).

=== Literacy ===
As of 2011 census the total number of literate persons in Lawalaung CD block was 19,550 (49.02% of the population over 6 years) out of which males numbered 12,001 (58.92% of the male population over 6 years) and females numbered 7,549 (30.33% of the female population over 6 years). The gender disparity (the difference between female and male literacy rates) was 28.59%.

As of 2011 census, literacy in Chatra district was 60.18% Literacy in Jharkhand (for population over 7 years) was 66.41% in 2011. Literacy in India in 2011 was 74.04%.

See also – List of Jharkhand districts ranked by literacy rate

Literacy in CD Blocks of
Chatra district
Shaligram Ramnarayanpur – 54.83
Pratappur – 53.19%
Kunda – 44.84%
Lawalong – 49.02%
Chatra – 55.54%
Kanhachatti – 62.88%
Itkhori – 62.90%
Mayurhand – 64.41%
Gidhour – 68.07%
Pathalgada – 67.39%
Simaria – 63.40%
Tandwa – 62.74%
Source: 2011 Census: CD Block Wise
Primary Census Abstract Data

=== Language and religion ===
Religions in Lawalong CD block (2011)
Religion	Percent
Hinduism	93.08%
Islam	6.30%
Other or not stated	0.62%

Hindi is the official language in Jharkhand and Urdu has been declared as an additional official language.

Languages of Lawalong CD block (2011)
1. Hindi (74.9%)
2. Khortha (23.0%)
3. Urdu (1.71%)
4. Others (0.32%)

At the time of the 2011 census, 74.94% of the population spoke Hindi, 22.99% Khortha and 1.71% Urdu as their first language.

== Rural poverty ==
Total number of BPL households in Lawalong CD block in 2002-2007 was 6,815. According to 2011 census, number of households in Lawalong CD block was 9,233. Rural poverty in Jharkhand declined from 66% in 1993–94 to 46% in 2004–05. In 2011, it has come down to 39.1%.

== Economy ==
=== Livelihood ===
Livelihood
in Lawalong CD block
1. Cultivators (23.8%)
2. Agricultural labourers (55.0%)
3. Household industries (8.11%)
4. Other Workers (13.2%)

In Lawalong CD block in 2011, amongst the class of total workers, cultivators numbered 5,227 and formed 23.75%, agricultural labourers numbered 12,099 and formed 54.96%, household industry workers numbered 1,786 and formed 8.11% and other workers numbered 2,901 and formed 13.18%. Total workers numbered 22,013 and formed 43.54% of the total population, and non-workers numbered 28,540 and formed 56.46% of the population.

=== Infrastructure ===
There are 97 inhabited villages in Lawalong CD block. In 2011, 4 villages had power supply. 97 villages had well water (covered/ uncovered), 93 villages had hand pumps, and all villageshad drinking water facility. 6 villages had post offices, 15 villages had sub post offices, no villages had telephones (land lines), 4 villages had mobile phone coverage. 93 villages had pucca (paved) village roads, 14 villages had bus service (public/ private), 6 villages had autos/ modified autos, 10 villages had taxi/vans and 17 villages had tractors. 16 villages had bank branches, 2 villages had agricultural credit societies, 1 village had cinema/ video hall, 1 village had public library and public reading room. 26 villages had public distribution system, 6 villages had weekly haat (market) and 29 villages had assembly polling stations.

=== Agriculture ===
Chatra is a predominantly forest district with 65% of the land area being covered with forests. The balance 35% of the area has both rocky and alluvial soil. Alluvial soil is found mostly near river valleys. Rice is the main crop of the district. Other important crops grown are bajra, maize and pulses (mainly arhar and gram).

=== Backward Regions Grant Fund ===
Chatra district is listed as a backward region and receives financial support from the Backward Regions Grant Fund. The fund created by the Government of India is designed to redress regional imbalances in development. As of 2012, 272 districts across the country were listed under this scheme. The list includes 21 districts of Jharkhand.

== Tourism ==
=== Lawalong Wildlife Sanctuary ===
Lawalong Wildlife Sanctuary was notified in 1978. It covers an area of 207 km^{2}. Leopards, tigers, deer, wild boar and other animals are there in the sanctuary. Lilajan, Chako Nala and Amanat are rivers in and around the sanctuary.

== Education ==
According to the District Census Handbook, Chatra, 2011 census, Lawalong CD block had 25 villages with pre-primary schools, 76 villages with primary schools, 37 villages with middle schools, 1 village with secondary school, 19 villages with no educational facility.

== Healthcare ==
According to the District Census Handbook, Chatra, 2011 census, Lawalong CD block had 4 villages with primary health centres, 7 villages with primary health subcentres, 3 villages with maternity and child welfare centres, 3 villages with allopathic hospitals, 2 villages with dispensaries, 1 village with veterinary hospital, 2 villages with family welfare centres, 4 villages with medicine shops.
.*Note: Private medical practitioners, alternative medicine etc. not included
