= Mayurhand block =

Mayurhand
- Community development block
- Location in Jharkhand, India Mayurhand (India)
- Coordinates: 24°17′35″N 85°14′33″E
- Country: India
- State: Jharkhand
- District: Chatra
- CD block: Mayurhand

Government
  - Type: Federal democracy

Area
  - Total: 133.28 km^{2} (51.46 sq mi)
- Elevation: 386 m (1,266 ft)

Population (2011)
  - Total: 58,925
  - Density: 442.11/km^{2} (1,145.1/sq mi)

Languages
  - Official: Hindi, Urdu
- Time zone: UTC+5:30 (IST)
- PIN: 825408
- Telephone/STD code: 06547 (Itkhori)
- Vehicle registration: JH 13
- Literacy: 64.41%
- Lok Sabha constituency: Chatra
- Vidhan Sabha constituency: Chatra
- Website: chatra.nic.in

Mayurhand is a community development block that forms an administrative division in the Chatra subdivision of the Chatra district, Jharkhand state, India.

== Overview ==
Chatra district forms a part of the Upper Hazaribagh Plateau, Lower Hazaribagh Plateau and northern scarp. Located at an elevation of about 450 metres (1,476 ft), the general slope of the district is from north to south. Red laterite acidic soil predominates in an area that is primarily dependent upon rain-fed agriculture. Around 60% of the district is covered with forests. The district has a population density of 275 persons per km^{2}. Around two-thirds of the families in the district live below poverty line. In the extreme south of the district some portions of Tandwa CD Block are part of North Karanpura Coalfield.

== Maoist activities ==
Jharkhand is one of the states affected by Maoist activities. As of 2012, Chatra was one of the 14 highly affected districts in the state. 5 people were killed in Chatra district in 2012, but Maoist activities, such as arms training camps and organisation of ‘Jan Adalats’ (kangaroo courts) were on the decline. As of 2016, Chatra was identified as one of the 13 focus areas by the state police to check Maoist activities.

== Geography ==
Mayurhand is located at 24°17′35″N 85°14′33″E.

Mayurhand CD block is bounded by Chauparan CD block, in Hazaribagh district, in the north, Barhi and Padma CD blocks, in Hazaribagh district, in the east, Katkamsandi CD block, in Hazaribagh district, in the south and Itkhori CD block in the west.

Mayurhand CD block has an area of 133.28 km^{2}.Itkhori police station serves this block. The headquarters of Mayurhand CD block is at Mayurhand village.

There are 10 panchayats and 118 villages in Mayurhand CD block.

Gram panchayats of Mayurhand block/ panchayat samiti are: Husia, Mayurhand, Belkhori, Karma, Manjganwa, Kadganwa Kala, Fuland, Pandni, Soki and Petaderi.

== Demographics ==
=== Population ===
According to the 2011 Census of India, Mayurhand CD block had a total population of 58,925, all of which were rural. There were 29,482 (50%) males and 29,443 (50%) females. Population in the age range 0–6 years was 10,272. Scheduled Castes numbered 15,448 (26.22%) and Scheduled Tribes numbered 212 (0.36%).

=== Literacy ===
As per the 2011 census, the total number of literate persons in Mayurhand CD block was 31,339 (64.41% of the population over 6 years) out of which males numbered 18,222 (75.33% of the male population over 6 years) and females numbered 13,117 (44.57% of the female population over 6 years). The gender disparity (the difference between female and male literacy rates) was 30.76%.

As per 2011 census, literacy in Chatra district was 60.18% Literacy in Jharkhand (for population over 7 years) was 66.41% in 2011. Literacy in India in 2011 was 74.04%.

See also – List of Jharkhand districts ranked by literacy rate

Literacy in CD Blocks of
Chatra district
Shaligram Ramnarayanpur – 54.83
Pratappur – 53.19%
Kunda – 44.84%
Lawalong – 49.02%
Chatra – 55.54%
Kanhachatti – 62.88%
Itkhori – 62.90%
Mayurhand – 64.41%
Gidhour – 68.07%
Pathalgada – 67.39%
Simaria – 63.40%
Tandwa – 62.74%
Source: 2011 Census: CD Block Wise
Primary Census Abstract Data

=== Language and religion ===
Religions in Mayurhand CD block (2011)
Religion	Percent
Hinduism	94.02%
Islam	5.85%
Other or not stated	0.13%

Hindi is the official language in Jharkhand and Urdu has been declared as an additional official language.

Languages of Mayurhand CD block (2011)
1. Khortha (67.5%)
2. Hindi (31.3%)
3. Others (1.16%)

At the time of the 2011 census, 67.52% of the population spoke Khortha and 31.32% Hindi as their first language.

== Rural poverty ==
Rural poverty in Jharkhand declined from 66% in 1993–94 to 46% in 2004–05. In 2011, it has come down to 39.1%.

Note: BPL data not available for Mayurhand CD block – possibly included in data for Itkhori CD block.

== Economy ==
=== Livelihood ===
Livelihood
in Mayurhand CD block
1. Cultivators (38.1%)
2. Agricultural labourers (41.3%)
3. Household industries (2.73%)
4. Other Workers (17.9%)

In Mayurhand CD block in 2011, among the class of total workers, cultivators numbered 7,376 and formed 38.12%, agricultural labourers numbered 7,988 and formed 41.29%, household industry workers numbered 529 and formed 2.73% and other workers numbered 3,454 and formed 17.85%. Total workers numbered 19,347 and formed 32.83% of the total population, and non-workers numbered 39,579 and formed 67.17% of the population.

=== Infrastructure ===
There are 108 inhabited villages in Mayurhand CD block. In 2011, 60 villages had power supply. 4 villages had tap water (treated/ untreated), 104 villages had well water (covered/ uncovered), 104 villages had hand pumps, and all villages had drinking water facility. 2 villages had post offices, 5 villages had sub post offices, 24 villages had telephones (land lines), 52 villages had mobile phone coverage. 107 villages had pucca (paved) village roads, 21 villages had bus service (public/ private), 11 villages had autos/ modified autos, 30 villages had taxi/vans and 37 villages had tractors. 5 villages had bank branches, 2 villages had agricultural credit societies. 38 villages had public distribution system, 8 villages had weekly haat (market) and 35 villages had assembly polling stations.

=== Agriculture ===
Chatra is a predominantly forest district with 65% of the land area being covered with forests. The balance 35% of the area has both rocky and alluvial soil. Alluvial soil is found mostly near river valleys. Rice is the main crop of the district. Other important crops grown are bajra, maize and pulses (mainly arhar and gram).

=== Backward Regions Grant Fund ===
Chatra district is listed as a backward region and receives financial support from the Backward Regions Grant Fund. The fund created by the Government of India is designed to redress regional imbalances in development. As of 2012, 272 districts across the country were listed under this scheme. The list includes 21 districts of Jharkhand.

== Education ==
According to the District Census Handbook, Chatra, 2011 census, Mayurhand CD block had 29 villages with pre-primary schools, 78 villages with primary schools, 44 villages with middle schools, 6 villages with secondary schools, 2 villages with senior secondary schools, 23 villages with no educational facility.
.*Note: Senior secondary schools are also known as Inter colleges in Jharkhand

== Healthcare ==
According to the District Census Handbook, Chatra, 2011 census, Mayurhand CD block had 18 villages with primary health centres, 23 villages with primary health subcentres, 22 villages with maternity and child welfare centres, 6 villages with allopathic hospitals, 8 villages with dispensaries, 7 villages with veterinary hospitals, 7 villages with family welfare centres, 7 villages with medicine shops.
.*Note: Private medical practitioners, alternative medicine etc. not included
