= Kanhachatti =

- Community development block
- Location in Jharkhand, India Kanhachatti (India)
- Coordinates: 24°17′15″N 85°2′0″E
- Country: India
- State: Jharkhand
- District: Chatra
- CD block: Kanhachatti

Government
  - Type: Federal democracy

Area
  - Total: 227.49 km^{2} (87.83 sq mi)

Population (2011)
  - Total: 63,012
  - Density: 276.99/km^{2} (717.40/sq mi)

Languages
  - Official: Hindi, Urdu
- Time zone: UTC+5:30 (IST)
- PIN: 825401 (Chatra)
- Telephone code: 06541
- Vehicle registration: JH-13
- Literacy: 62.88%
- Lok Sabha constituency: Chatra
- Vidhan Sabha constituency: Chatra
- Website: chatra.nic.in

Kanhachatti is a community development block that forms an administrative division in the Chatra subdivision of the Chatra district, Jharkhand state, India.

== Kandynagar ==
Kanhachatti is located a short distance from the block headquarter - Kandynagar. The Kharwar king was in the Kandynagar pargana. The famous ruler of Kharwars, the descendants of Raja Pratap Dhaval Dev of Rohtas Gadh, were the kings of Kandy Pargana. They were also relatives of Ramgarh Raj. The Kharwars ruled in this pargana for about 200 years. Kandinagar was never attacked: Kandy Pargana was never attacked. Being a small sultanate, it remained safe. Now this family has no descendants. The king, who was once always illuminated, is no longer going to light a lamp in the fort. Since when has the Sultanate disintegrated? A story is prevalent among the villagers about this royal family. It is said that the Kharwar king of Kedinagar was fond of tying and adorning the turban. For this he was known far and wide. He had to go to Padma Fort to attend an important meeting on the expansion of the kingdom. There was a gathering of many kings. But the Kandinagar king, who is fond of turban, spent the night only in grooming the turban. Due to this he could not reach Padma on time. When he arrived it was too late. Ramgarh Raja got the benefit of this. Kedinagar Raja suffered heavy losses. After this the sultanate of Kharwar king was reduced to just 10 kos. Tarakeswar Singh was the last descendant of the Raj family. The king's citadel was in a large mound which has now turned into ruins.

== Overview ==
Chatra district forms a part of the Upper Hazaribagh Plateau, Lower Hazaribagh Plateau and northern scarp. Located at an elevation of about 450 metres (1,476 ft), the general slope of the district is from north to south. Red laterite acidic soil predominates in an area that is primarily dependent upon rain-fed agriculture. Around 60% of the district is covered with forests. The district has a population density of 275 persons per km^{2}. Around two-thirds of the families in the district live below poverty line. In the extreme south of the district some portions of Tandwa CD Block are part of North Karanpura Coalfield.

== Maoist activities ==
Jharkhand is one of the states affected by Maoist activities. As of 2012, Chatra was one of the 14 highly affected districts in the state. 5 persons were killed in Chatra district in 2012, but Maoist activities, such as arms training camps and organisation of ‘Jan Adalats’ (kangaroo courts) were on the decline. As of 2016, Chatra was identified as one of the 13 focus areas by the state police to check Maoist activities.

== Geography ==
Kanhachatti is located at 24°17′15″N 85°2′0″E

Kanhachatti CD block is bounded by and Barachatti CD block in Gaya district of Bihar in the north, Itkhori CD block in the east, Chatra and Gidhour CD blocks in the south and Shaligram Ramnarayanpur CD block in the west.

Kanhachatti CD block has an area of 227.49 km^{2}.Rajpur police station serves this block. The headquarters of Kanhachatti CD block is at Chiridiri village.

There are 10 panchayats and 124 villages in Kanhachatti CD block.

Gram panchayats of Kanhachatti CD block/ panchayat samiti are: Bengokala, Kothaiya, Tulbul, Rajpur, Chridiri, Madgada, Kainidinagar, Jamri Bakaspura, Bakchama and Charu.

== Demographics ==
=== Population ===
According to the 2011 Census of India, Kanhachatti CD block had a total population of 63,012, all of which were rural. There were 32,112 (51%) males and 30,900 (49%) females. Population in the age range 0–6 years was 11,180. Scheduled Castes numbered 20,308 (32.23%) and Scheduled Tribes numbered 2,016 (3.20%).

=== Literacy ===
As of 2011 census, the total number of literate persons in Kanhachatti CD block was 32,592 (62.88% of the population over 6 years) out of which males numbered 19,379 (73.41% of the male population over 6 years) and females numbered 13,213 (42.78% of the female population over 6 years). The gender disparity (the difference between female and male literacy rates) was 30.63%.

As of 2011 census, literacy in Chatra district was 60.18% Literacy in Jharkhand (for population over 7 years) was 66.41% in 2011. Literacy in India in 2011 was 74.04%.

See also – List of Jharkhand districts ranked by literacy rate

Literacy in CD Blocks of
Chatra district
Shaligram Ramnarayanpur – 54.83
Pratappur – 53.19%
Kunda – 44.84%
Lawalong – 49.02%
Chatra – 55.54%
Kanhachatti – 62.88%
Itkhori – 62.90%
Mayurhand – 64.41%
Gidhour – 68.07%
Pathalgada – 67.39%
Simaria – 63.40%
Tandwa – 62.74%
Source: 2011 Census: CD Block Wise
Primary Census Abstract Data

=== Language and religion ===
Religions in Kanhachatti CD block (2011)
Religion	Percent
Hinduism	90.33%
Islam	9.24%
Other or not stated	0.43%

Hindi is the official language in Jharkhand and Urdu has been declared as an additional official language.

Languages of Kanhachatti CD block (2011)
1. Hindi (63.1%)
2. Khortha (32.2%)
3. Urdu (3.64%)
4. Others (1.00%)

At the time of the 2011 census, 63.13% of the population spoke Hindi, 32.23% Khortha and 3.64% Urdu as their first language.

== Rural poverty ==
Rural poverty in Jharkhand declined from 66% in 1993–94 to 46% in 2004–05. In 2011, it has come down to 39.1%.

Note: BPL data not available for Kanhachatti CD block – possibly included in the data for Chatra CD block.

== Economy ==
=== Livelihood ===
Livelihood
in Kanhachatti CD block
1. Cultivators (21.1%)
2. Agricultural labourers (65.5%)
3. Household industries (2.39%)
4. Other Workers (11.0%)

In Kanhachatti CD block in 2011, among the class of total workers, cultivators numbered 5,012 and formed 21.12%, agricultural labourers numbered 15,534 and formed 65.47%, household industry workers numbered 568 and formed 2.39% and other workers numbered 2,612 and formed 11.01%. Total workers numbered 23,726 and formed 37.65% of the total population, and non-workers numbered 39,286 and formed 62.35% of the population.

=== Infrastructure ===
There are 117 inhabited villages in Kanhachatti CD block. In 2011, 28 villages had power supply. 7 villages had tap water (treated/ untreated), 117 villages had well water (covered/ uncovered), 114 villages had hand pumps, and all villages had drinking water facility. 9 villages had post offices, 6 villages had sub post offices, no village had telephones (land lines), 33 villages had mobile phone coverage. 113 villages had pucca (paved) village roads, 11 villages had bus service (public/ private), 6 villages had autos/ modified autos, 6 villages had taxi/vans and 66 villages had tractors. 4 villages had bank branches, 2 villages had agricultural credit societies. 43 villages had public distribution system, 30 villages had weekly haat (market) and 52 villages had assembly polling stations.

=== Agriculture ===
Chatra is a predominantly forest district with 65% of the land area being covered with forests. The balance, 35% of the area has both rocky and alluvial soil. Alluvial soil is found mostly near river valleys. Rice is the main crop of the district. Other important crops grown are bajra, maize and pulses (mainly arhar and gram).

=== Backward Regions Grant Fund ===
Chatra district is listed as a backward region and receives financial support from the Backward Regions Grant Fund. The fund created by the Government of India is designed to redress regional imbalances in development. As of 2012, 272 districts across the country were listed under this scheme. The list includes 21 districts of Jharkhand.

== Education ==
According to the District Census Handbook, Chatra, 2011 census, Kanhachatti CD block had 44 villages with pre-primary schools, 94 villages with primary schools, 54 villages with middle schools, 6 villages with secondary schools, 2 villages with senior secondary schools, 21 villages with no educational facility.
.*Note: Senior secondary schools are also known as Inter colleges in Jharkhand

== Healthcare ==
According to the District Census Handbook, Chatra, 2011 census, Kanhachatti CD block had 3 villages with primary health centres, 7 villages with primary health subcentres, 2 villages with maternity and child welfare centres, 2 villages with allopathic hospitals, 2 villages with dispensaries, 1 village with veterinary hospital, 3 villages with medicine shops.
.*Note: Private medical practitioners, alternative medicine etc. not included
