= Tandwa block =

Tandwa
- Community development block
- Location in Jharkhand, India Tandwa (India)
- Coordinates: 23.8552°N 85.0309°E
- Country: India
- State: Jharkhand
- District: Chatra
- CD block: Tandwa

Government
  - Type: Federal democracy

Area
  - Total: 455.21 km^{2} (175.76 sq mi)
- Elevation: 447 m (1,467 ft)

Population (2011)
  - Total: 126,119
  - Density: 277.06/km^{2} (717.57/sq mi)

Languages
  - Official: Hindi, Urdu
- Time zone: UTC+5:30 (IST)
- PIN: 825321 (Tandwa)
- Telephone/STD code: 06551
- Vehicle registration: JH 13
- Lok Sabha constituency: Chatra
- Vidhan Sabha constituency: Simaria
- Website: chatra.nic.in

Tandwa is a community development block that forms an administrative division in the Simaria subdivision of the Chatra district, Jharkhand state, India.

== Overview ==
Chatra district forms a part of the Upper Hazaribagh Plateau, Lower Hazaribagh Plateau and northern scarp. Located at an elevation of about 450 metres (1,476 ft), the general slope of the district is from north to south. Red laterite acidic soil predominates in an area that is primarily dependent upon rain-fed agriculture. Around 60% of the district is covered with forests. The district has a population density of 275 persons per km^{2}. Around two-thirds of the families in the district live below poverty line. In the extreme south of the district some portions of Tandwa CD Block are part of North Karanpura Coalfield.

== Maoist activities ==
Jharkhand is one of the states affected by Maoist activities. As of 2012, Chatra was one of the 14 highly affected districts in the state. 5 persons were killed in Chatra district in 2012, but Maoist activities, such as arms training camps and organisation of ‘Jan Adalats’ (kangaroo courts) were on the decline.

As of 2016, Chatra was identified as one of the 13 focus areas by the state police to check Maoist activities.

== History ==
=== Cave paintings ===
There are interesting pre-historic cave paintings in Saraiya and Thetangi villages in Tandwa CD block.

== Geography ==
Tandwa is located at 23°51′19″N 85°01′51″E. It has an average elevation of 508 metres (1,667 ft).

Tandwa CD block is bounded by Simaria CD block in the north, Keredari CD block, in Hazaribagh district, in the east, Khelari CD block, in Ranchi district, in the south and Balumath CD block, in Latehar district, in the west.

Tandwa CD block has an area of 455.21 km^{2}.Tandwa and Piparwar police stations serve this block. The headquarters of Tandwa CD block is at Tandwa village.

There are 19 panchayats and 96 villages in Tandwa CD block.

Gram panchayats of Tandwa CD block/ panchayat samiti are: Padumpur, Dhangada, Misraul, Nawada alias Teliadih, Kabra, Pokla alias Kasiadih, Koyad, Saradhu, Gadilog, Tandwa, Raham, Bargano, Dahu, Benti, Kalyapur, Bahera, Kichto, Bachara I (North) and Bachara II (South).

== Demographics ==
=== Population ===
According to the 2011 Census of India, Tandwa CD block had a total population of 126,319, of which 113,350 were rural and 12,969 were urban. There were 65,141 (52%) males and 53,016 (48%) females. Population in the age range 0–6 years was 21,938. Scheduled Castes numbered 30,104 (23.87%) and Scheduled Tribes numbered 20,330 (16.12%).

Tandwa village had a population of 6,475 in 2011.

Bachra is a census town in Tandwa CD block with a population of 12,969 in 2011.

=== Literacy ===
As of 2011 census, the total number of literate persons in Tandwa CD block was 65,367 (62.74% of the population over 6 years) out of which males numbered 39,132 (72.60% of the male population over 6 years) and females numbered 26,235 (42.89% of the female population over 6 years). The gender disparity (the difference between female and male literacy rates) was 29.71%.

As of 2011 census, literacy in Chatra district was 60.18%. Literacy in Jharkhand (for population over 7 years) was 66.41% in 2011. Literacy in India in 2011 was 74.04%.

See also – List of Jharkhand districts ranked by literacy rate

Literacy in CD Blocks of
Chatra district
Shaligram Ramnarayanpur – 54.83
Pratappur – 53.19%
Kunda – 44.84%
Lawalong – 49.02%
Chatra – 55.54%
Kanhachatti – 62.88%
Itkhori – 62.90%
Mayurhand – 64.41%
Gidhour – 68.07%
Pathalgada – 67.39%
Simaria – 63.40%
Tandwa – 62.74%
Source: 2011 Census: CD Block Wise
Primary Census Abstract Data

=== Language and religion ===
Religions in Tandwa CD block (2011)
Religion	Percent
Hinduism	81.86%
Islam	10.00%
Sarna	6.67%
Christianity	0.89%
Other or not stated	0.58%

Hindi is the official language in Jharkhand and Urdu has been declared as an additional official language.

Languages of Tandwa CD block (2011)
1. Khortha (63.9%)
2. Hindi (17.0%)
3. Kurukh (12.4%)
4. Urdu (3.25%)
5. Nagpuri (1.32%)
6. Others (2.21%)

At the time of the 2011 census, 63.85% of the population spoke Khortha, 16.96% Hindi, 12.41% Kurukh, 3.25% Urdu and 1.32% Nagpuri as their first language.

== Rural poverty ==
Total number of BPL households in Tandwa CD block in 2002-2007 was 13,127. According to 2011 census, number of households in Tandwa CD block was 23,319. Rural poverty in Jharkhand declined from 66% in 1993–94 to 46% in 2004–05. In 2011, it has come down to 39.1%.

== Economy ==
=== Livelihood ===
Livelihood
in Tandwa CD block
1. Cultivators (30.5%)
2. Agricultural labourers (40.5%)
3. Household industries (2.45%)
4. Other Workers (26.4%)

In Tandwa CD block in 2011, among the class of total workers, cultivators numbered 14,256 and formed 30.48%, agricultural labourers numbered 18,949 and formed 40.42%, household industry workers numbered 1,241 and formed 2.65% and other workers numbered 12,323 and formed 26.35%. Total workers numbered 46,769 and formed 37.02% of the total population, and non-workers numbered 79,550 and formed 62.98% of the population.

=== Infrastructure ===
There are 91 inhabited villages in Tandwa CD block. In 2011, 22 villages had power supply. 5 villages had tap water (treated/ untreated), 90 villages had well water (covered/ uncovered), 91 villages had hand pumps, and all villages had drinking water facility. 9 villages had post offices, 6 villages had sub post offices, 1 village had telephone (land line), 25 villages had mobile phone coverage. All villages had pucca (paved) village roads, 30 villages had bus service (public/ private), 16 villages had autos/ modified autos, 14 villages had taxi/vans and 38 villages had tractors. 5 villages had bank branches, 2 villages had agricultural credit societies. 40 villages had public distribution system, 16 villages had weekly haat (market) and 48 villages had assembly polling stations.

=== Agriculture ===
Chatra is a predominantly forest district with 65% of the land area being covered with forests. The balance 35% of the area has both rocky and alluvial soil. Alluvial soil is found mostly near river valleys. Rice is the main crop of the district. Other important crops grown are bajra, maize and pulses (mainly arhar and gram).

=== North Karanpura Thermal Power Station ===
NTPC Limited is constructing the 3 X 660 MW North Karanpura Thermal Power Station at Tandwa at an appraised current (2015) estimated cost of ₹ 14,366.58 crore.

=== Coal mining ===
The North Karanpura Coalfield is spread across parts of Ranchi, Hazaribagh, Chatra and Latehar districts of Jharkhand covering an area of 1,230 km^{2}. This coalfield in the upper reaches of the Damodar Valley, has reserves of around 14 billion tonnes of coal, very little of which has been exploited. Karkatta, KD Hesalong, Manki, Churi, Bachara UG, Bachara OC, and Dakara are long established collieries south of the Damodar. North of the Damodar lies comparatively new major mines such as Piparwar Mine and Ashoka Project. 23 mines are planned in the northern sector. Those in an advanced stage of planning are: Dhadu, Purnadih, Magadh, and Amrapali. This happens to be the largest mining sector of Central Coalfields Limited.

See also - Magadh Sanghamitra Area, Amrapali & Chandragupta Area

=== Backward Regions Grant Fund ===
Chatra district is listed as a backward region and receives financial support from the Backward Regions Grant Fund. The fund created by the Government of India is designed to redress regional imbalances in development. As of 2012, 272 districts across the country were listed under this scheme. The list includes 21 districts of Jharkhand.

== Education ==
According to the District Census Handbook, Chatra, 2011 census, Tandwa CD block had 27 villages with pre-primary schools, 73 villages with primary schools, 48 villages with middle schools, 5 villages with secondary schools, 3 villages with senior secondary schools, 14 villages with no educational facility.
.*Note: Senior secondary schools are also known as Inter colleges in Jharkhand

Vananchal College was established at Tandwa in 1985. It is affiliated with the Vinoba Bhave University.

== Healthcare ==
According to the District Census Handbook, Chatra, 2011 census, Tandwa CD block had 6 villages with primary health subcentres, 2 villages with maternity and child welfare centres, 3 villages with allopathic hospital, 2 villages with dispensaries, 1 village with family welfare centre, 2 villages with medicine shops.
.*Note: Private medical practitioners, alternative medicine etc. not included
