= Tunrag =

Village in India

Tunrag is a village in Chatra district of Jharkhand state of India.
