= Pathalgada block =

Pathalgada
- Community development block
- Location in Jharkhand, India Pathalgada (India)
- Coordinates: 24°7′37″N 85°4′8″E
- Country: India
- State: Jharkhand
- District: Chatra
- CD block: Pathalgada

Government
  - Type: Federal democracy

Area
  - Total: 133.21 km^{2} (51.43 sq mi)
- Elevation: 447 m (1,467 ft)

Population (2011)
  - Total: 31,530
  - Density: 236.7/km^{2} (613.0/sq mi)

Languages
  - Official: Hindi, Urdu
- Time zone: UTC+5:30 (IST)
- PIN: 825408 (Itkhori)
- Telephone/STD code: 06559
- Vehicle registration: JH 13
- Literacy: 67.39%
- Lok Sabha constituency: Chatra
- Vidhan Sabha constituency: Simaria
- Website: chatra.nic.in

Pathalgada (also spelled Pathalgora) is a community development block that forms an administrative division in the Simaria subdivision of the Chatra district, Jharkhand state, India.

== Overview ==
Chatra district forms a part of the Upper Hazaribagh Plateau, Lower Hazaribagh Plateau and northern scarp. Located at an elevation of about 450 metres (1,476 ft), the general slope of the district is from north to south. Red laterite acidic soil predominates in an area that is primarily dependent upon rain-fed agriculture. Around 60% of the district is covered with forests. The district has a population density of 275 persons per km^{2}. Around two-thirds of the families in the district live below poverty line. In the extreme south of the district some portions of Tandwa CD Block are part of North Karanpura Coalfield.

== Maoist activities ==
Jharkhand is one of the states affected by Maoist activities. As of 2012, Chatra was one of the 14 highly affected districts in the state. 5 persons were killed in Chatra district in 2012, but Maoist activities, such as arms training camps and organisation of ‘Jan Adalats’ (kangaroo courts) were on the decline.

As of 2016, Chatra was identified as one of the 13 focus areas by the state police to check Maoist activities.

== Geography ==
Pathalgada is located at 24°7′37″N 85°4′8″E.

Pathalgada CD block is bounded by Gidhour CD block in the north, Katkamsandi CD block, in Hazaribagh district, in the east, Simaria CD block in the south and Chatra CD block in the west.

Pathalgada CD block has an area of 133.21 km^{2}.Pathalgada police station serves this block. The headquarters of Pathalgada CD block is at Pathalgada village.

There are 5 panchayats and 30 villages in Pathalgada CD block.

Gram panchayats of Pathalgada block/ panchayat Samiti are Nawadih Damaul, Barwadih, Singhani, Noganw and Meral.

== Demographics ==
=== Population ===
According to the 2011 Census of India, Pathalgora CD block had a total population of 31,530, all of which were rural. There were 15,867 (50%) males and 15,663 (50%) females. Population in the age range 0–6 years was 5,475. Scheduled Castes numbered 7,927 (25.14%) and Scheduled Tribes numbered 1,163 (3.69%).

=== Literacy ===
As per the 2011 census, the total number of literate persons in Pathalgora CD block was 17,558 (67.39% of the population over 6 years) out of which males numbered 10,226 (78.34% of the male population over 6 years) and females numbered 7,332 (46.85% of the female population over 6 years). The gender disparity (the difference between female and male literacy rates) was 31.53%.

As per the 2011 census, literacy in Chatra district was 60.18% Literacy in Jharkhand (for population over 7 years) was 66.41% in 2011. Literacy in India in 2011 was 74.04%.

See also – List of Jharkhand districts ranked by literacy rate

Literacy in CD Blocks of
Chatra district
Shaligram Ramnarayanpur – 54.83
Pratappur – 53.19%
Kunda – 44.84%
Lawalong – 49.02%
Chatra – 55.54%
Kanhachatti – 62.88%
Itkhori – 62.90%
Mayurhand – 64.41%
Gidhour – 68.07%
Pathalgada – 67.39%
Simaria – 63.40%
Tandwa – 62.74%
Source: 2011 Census: CD Block Wise
Primary Census Abstract Data

=== Language and religion ===
Religions in Pathalgada CD block (2011)
Religion	Percent
Hinduism	83.52%
Islam	7.45%
Sarna	5.89%
Christianity	3.03%
Other or not stated	0.11%

Hindi is the official language in Jharkhand and Urdu has been declared as an additional official language.

Languages of Pathalgada CD block (2011)
1. Khortha (55.5%)
2. Hindi (31.8%)
3. Mundari (7.03%)
4. Urdu (3.98%)
5. Nagpuri (1.13%)
6. Others (0.52%)

At the time of the 2011 census, 55.51% of the population spoke Khortha, 31.83% Hindi, 7.03% Mundari, 3.98% Urdu and 1.13% Nagpuri as their first language.

== Rural poverty ==
Total number of BPL households in Pathalgada CD block in 2002-2007 was 4,537. According to 2011 census, number of households in Pathalgada CD block was 5,701. Rural poverty in Jharkhand declined from 66% in 1993–94 to 46% in 2004–05. In 2011, it has come down to 39.1%.

== Economy ==
=== Livelihood ===
Livelihood
in Pathalgada CD block
1. Cultivators (58.8%)
2. Agricultural labourers (23.9%)
3. Household industries (3.50%)
4. Other Workers (13.7%)

In Pathalgada CD block in 2011, among the class of total workers, cultivators numbered 9,179 and formed 58.84%, agricultural labourers numbered 3,733 and formed 23.93%, household industry workers numbered 546 and formed 3.50% and other workers numbered 2,144 and formed 13.73%. Total workers numbered 15,599 and formed 49.47% of the total population, and non-workers numbered 15,931 and formed 50.53% of the population.

=== Infrastructure ===
There are 30 inhabited villages in Pathalgada CD block. In 2011, 1 village had power supply. 9 villages had tap water (treated/ untreated), 28 villages had well water (covered/ uncovered), 30 villages had hand pumps, and all villages had drinking water facility. 1 village had post office, 2 villages had sub post offices, 2 villages had telephone (land line), 11 villages had mobile phone coverage. All villages had pucca (paved) village roads, 6 villages had bus service (public/ private), 8 villages had taxi/vans and 16 villages had tractors. 1 village had bank branch, 1 village had cinema/ video hall. 8 villages had public distribution system, 6 villages had weekly haat (market) and 6 villages had assembly polling stations.

=== Agriculture ===
Chatra is a predominantly forest district with 65% of the land area being covered with forests. The balance 35% of the area has both rocky and alluvial soil. Alluvial soil is found mostly near river valleys. Rice is the main crop of the district. Other important crops grown are bajra, maize and pulses (mainly arhar and gram).

=== Backward Regions Grant Fund ===
Chatra district is listed as a backward region and receives financial support from the Backward Regions Grant Fund. The fund created by the Government of India is designed to redress regional imbalances in development. As of 2012, 272 districts across the country were listed under this scheme. The list includes 21 districts of Jharkhand.

== Education ==
According to the District Census Handbook, Chatra, 2011 census, Pathalgada CD block had 10 villages with pre-primary schools, 26 villages with primary schools, 15 villages with middle schools, 2 villages with secondary schools, 1 village with senior secondary school, 1 village with no educational facility.
.*Note: Senior secondary schools are also known as Inter colleges in Jharkhand

== Healthcare ==
According to the District Census Handbook, Chatra, 2011 census, Pathalgada CD block had 2 villages with primary health subcentres, 1 village with allopathic hospital, 1 village with dispensary, 1 village with family welfare centre.
.*Note: Private medical practitioners, alternative medicine etc. not included
