= Chatra (community development block) =

- Community development block
- Location in Jharkhand Chatra (India)
- Coordinates: 24.2038°N 84.8703°E
- Country: India
- State: Jharkhand
- District: Chatra

Government
  - Type: Federal democracy

Area
  - Total: 400.21 km^{2} (154.52 sq mi)
- Elevation: 508 m (1,667 ft)

Population (2011)
  - Total: 101,014
  - Density: 252.40/km^{2} (653.72/sq mi)

Languages
  - Official: Hindi, Urdu
- Time zone: UTC+5:30 (IST)
- PIN: 825401 (Chatra)
- Telephone code: 06541
- Vehicle registration: JH-13
- Literacy: 55.54%
- Lok Sabha constituency: Chatra
- Vidhan Sabha constituency: Chatra
- Website: chatra.nic.in

Chatra is a community development block that forms an administrative division in the Chatra subdivision of the Chatra district in the Indian state of Jharkhand.

== Overview ==
Chatra district forms a part of the Upper Hazaribagh Plateau, Lower Hazaribagh Plateau and northern scarp. Located at an elevation of about 450 metres (1,476 ft), the general slope of the district is from north to south. Red laterite acidic soil predominates in an area that is primarily dependent upon rain-fed agriculture. Around 60% of the district is covered with forests. The district has a population density of 275 persons per km^{2}. Around two-thirds of the families in the district live below poverty line. In the extreme south of the district some portions of Tandwa CD Block are part of North Karanpura Coalfield.

== Maoist activities ==
Jharkhand is one of the states affected by Maoist activities. As of 2012, Chatra was one of the 14 highly affected districts in the state. 5 persons were killed in Chatra district in 2012, but Maoist activities, such as arms training camps and organisation of ‘Jan Adalats’ (kangaroo courts) were on the decline. As of 2016, Chatra was identified as one of the 13 focus areas by the state police to check Maoist activities.

== Geography ==
Chatra is located at 24°12′14″N 84°52′13″E. It has an average elevation of 508 metres (1669 feet).

Chatra CD block is bounded by Shaligram Ramnarayanpur and Kanhachatti CD blocks in the north, Gidhour and Pathalgada CD blocks in the east, Simaria and Lawalong CD blocks in the south and Kunda CD block in the west.

Chatra CD block has an area of 400.21 km^{2}.Chatra Sadar police station serves this block. The headquarters of Chatra CD block is at Chatra town.

There are 18 panchayats and 182 villages in Chatra CD Block.

Gram panchayats of Chatra CD Block/ panchayat samiti are: Moktama, Darha, Sikid, Paradih, Dewaria, Ara, Baraini, Brahmana, Godhai, Sima, Tikar, Damdoiya, Jangi, Gandharia, Dariatu and Lem.

== Demographics ==
=== Population ===
According to the 2011 Census of India, Chatra CD block had a total population of 101,014, all of which were rural. There were 51,958 (51%) males and 49,056 (49%) females. Population in the age range 0–6 years was 20,206. Scheduled Castes numbered 38,364 (37.98%) and Scheduled Tribes numbered 3,777 (3.74%).

=== Literacy ===
As of 2011 census, the total number of literate persons in Chatra CD block was 44,884 (55.54% of the population over 6 years) out of which males numbered 27,164 (65.27% of the male population over 6 years) and females numbered 17,720 (36.13% of the female population over 6 years). The gender disparity (the difference between female and male literacy rates) was 29.15%.

As of 2011 census, literacy in Chatra district was 60.18% Literacy in Jharkhand (for population over 7 years) was 66.41% in 2011. Literacy in India in 2011 was 74.04%.

See also – List of Jharkhand districts ranked by literacy rate

Literacy in CD Blocks of
Chatra district
Shaligram Ramnarayanpur – 54.83
Pratappur – 53.19%
Kunda – 44.84%
Lawalong – 49.02%
Chatra – 55.54%
Kanhachatti – 62.88%
Itkhori – 62.90%
Mayurhand – 64.41%
Gidhour – 68.07%
Pathalgada – 67.39%
Simaria – 63.40%
Tandwa – 62.74%
Source: 2011 Census: CD Block Wise
Primary Census Abstract Data

=== Language and religion ===
Religions in Chatra CD block (2011)
Religion	Percent
Hinduism	81.11%
Islam	16.75%
Christianity	1.28%
Sarna	0.56%
Other or not stated	0.30%

Hindi is the official language in Jharkhand and Urdu has been declared as an additional official language.

Languages of Chatra CD block (2011)
1. Khortha (46.5%)
2. Hindi (36.6%)
3. Urdu (12.4%)
4. Magahi (2.56%)
5. Others (1.94%)

At the time of the 2011 census, 46.50% of the population spoke Khortha, 36.62% Hindi, 12.38% Urdu and 2.56% Magahi as their first language.

== Rural poverty ==
Total number of BPL households in Chatra CD block in 2002-2007 was 16,489. According to 2011 census, number of households in Chatra CD block was 17,395. Rural poverty in Jharkhand declined from 66% in 1993–94 to 46% in 2004–05. In 2011, it has come down to 39.1%.

Note: BPL data possibly includes that of Kanhachatii CD block

== Economy ==
=== Livelihood ===
Livelihood
in Chatra CD block
1. Cultivators (25.2%)
2. Agricultural labourers (30.6%)
3. Household industries (5.51%)
4. Other Workers (38.7%)

In Chatra CD block in 2011, amongst the class of total workers, cultivators numbered 13,799 and formed 25.21%, agricultural labourers numbered 16,766 and formed 30.63%, household industry workers numbered 3,015 and formed 5.51% and other workers numbered 21,162 and formed 38.66%. Total workers numbered 54,742 and formed 36.25% of the total population, and non-workers numbered 96,257 and formed 63.75% of the population.

=== Infrastructure ===
There are 167 inhabited villages in Chatra CD block. In 2011, 38 villages had power supply. 4 villages had tap water (treated/ untreated), 165 villages had well water (covered/ uncovered), 164 villages had hand pumps, and all villages had drinking water facility. 6 villages had post offices, 7 villages had sub post offices, 9 villages had telephones (land lines), 64 villages had mobile phone coverage. 163 villages had pucca (paved) village roads, 7 villages had bus service (public/ private), 24 villages had autos/ modified autos, 9 villages had taxi/vans and 73 villages had tractors. 3 villages had bank branches, 1 village had agricultural credit society, 1 village had cinema/ video hall, 2 villages had public library and public reading room. 57 villages had public distribution system, 5 villages had weekly haat (market) and 49 villages had assembly polling stations.

=== Agriculture ===
Chatra is a predominantly forest district with 65% of the land area being covered with forests. The balance 35% of the area has both rocky and alluvial soil. Alluvial soil is found mostly near river valleys. Rice is the main crop of the district. Other important crops grown are bajra, maize and pulses (mainly arhar and gram).

=== Backward Regions Grant Fund ===
Chatra district is listed as a backward region and receives financial support from the Backward Regions Grant Fund. The fund created by the Government of India is designed to redress regional imbalances in development. As of 2012, 272 districts across the country were listed under this scheme. The list includes 21 districts of Jharkhand.

== Transport ==
NH 22 (old numbering NH 99) connects Sonbarsha (India-Nepal border) with Muzaffarpur, Patna, Gaya, Dobhi, Hunterganj and Chatra and terminates at its junction with NH 39 in Chandwa CD block in Latehar district. NH-22 crosses NH 19 (old numbering NH 2) at Dobhi in Gaya district of Bihar.

== Education ==
According to the District Census Handbook, Chatra, 2011 census, Chatra CD block had 27 villages with pre-primary schools, 127 villages with primary schools, 65 villages with middle schools, 13 villages with secondary schools, 6 villages with senior secondary schools, 39 villages with no educational facility.
.*Note:Senior secondary schools are also known as Inter colleges in Jharkhand

== Healthcare ==
According to the District Census Handbook, Chatra, 2011 census, Chatra CD block had 5 villages with primary health centres, 10 villages with primary health subcentres, 5 villages with maternity and child welfare centres, 5 villages with allopathic hospitals, 4 villages with dispensaries, 3 villages with veterinary hospitals, 3 villages with family welfare centres, 10 villages with medicine shops.
.*Note: Private medical practitioners, alternative medicine etc. not included
