= Shaligram Ramnarayanpur (community development block) =

Shaligram Ramnarayanpur Hunterganj
- Community development block
- Location in Jharkhand Shaligram Ramnarayanpur (India)
- Coordinates: 24.4341°N 84.8149°E
- Country: India
- State: Jharkhand
- District: Chatra

Government
  - Type: Federal democracy

Area
  - Total: 513.18 km^{2} (198.14 sq mi)
- Elevation: 252 m (827 ft)

Population (2011)
  - Total: 187,590
  - Density: 365.54/km^{2} (946.76/sq mi)

Languages
  - Official: Hindi, Urdu
- Time zone: UTC+5:30 (IST)
- PIN: 825420 (Hunterganj)
- Telephone code: 06550
- Vehicle registration: JH-13
- Literacy: 54.83%
- Lok Sabha constituency: Chatra
- Vidhan Sabha constituency: Chatra
- Website: chatra.nic.in

Shaligram Ramnarayanpur (Hunterganj) is a community development block that forms an administrative division in the Chatra subdivision of the Chatra district in the Indian state of Jharkhand.

== Overview ==
Chatra district forms a part of the Upper Hazaribagh Plateau, Lower Hazaribagh Plateau and northern scarp. Located at an elevation of about 450 metres (1,476 ft), the general slope of the district is from north to south. Red laterite acidic soil predominates in an area that is primarily dependent upon rain-fed agriculture. Around 60% of the district is covered with forests. The district has a population density of 275 persons per km^{2}. Around two-thirds of the families in the district live below poverty line. In the extreme south of the district some portions of Tandwa CD Block are part of North Karanpura Coalfield.

== Maoist activities ==
Jharkhand is one of the states affected by Maoist activities. As of 2012, Chatra was one of the 14 highly affected districts in the state. 5 persons were killed in Chatra district in 2012, but Maoist activities, such as arms training camps and organisation of ‘Jan Adalats’ (kangaroo courts) were on the decline. As of 2016, Chatra was identified as one of the 13 focus areas by the state police to check Maoist activities.

== Etymology ==
The CD block is named after Shaligram Singh and Ram Narayan Singh, two eminent freedom fighters of Chatra district (then Hazaribagh district).

== Geography ==
Hunterganj (Shaligram Ramnarayanpur) is located at 24°26′03″N 84°48′54″E. It has an average elevation of 252 metres (830 feet).

Shaligram Ramnarayanpur (Hunterganj) CD block is bounded by Banke Bazar, Sherghati and Dobhi CD blocks in Gaya district of Bihar in the north, Kanhachatti CD block in the east, Chatra and Kunda CD blocks in the south and Pratappur CD block in the west.

Shaligram Ramnarayanpur (Hunterganj) CD block has an area of 513.18 km^{2}.Hunterganj and Bashishtnagar police stations serve this block. The headquarters of Shaligram Ramnarayanpur (Hunterganj) CD block is at Hunterganj.

There are 28 panchayats and 270 villages Hunterganj CD Block.

Gram panchayats of Shaligram Ramnarayanpur (Hunterganj) CD block/ panchayat samiti are: Nawadih Panari, Jabra, Meerpur, Nawadih, Daha, Gerua, Lenjwa, Genjina, Pandepura Khurd, Baluri, Auru, Khuntikewal Khurd, Dumrikala, Chakla, Karma, Karailibar, Jori Kalan, Salaiya, Joldiha, Dantar, Painikala, Kataiya, Tawagada, Kobna, Kedikala, Tihet, Uraili and Gosaidih.

== Demographics ==
=== Population ===
According to the 2011 Census of India, Shaligram Ramnarayanpur (Hunterganj) CD block had a total population of 187,590, all of which were rural. There were 96,328 (51%) males and 91,262 (49%) females. Population in the age range 0–6 years was 36,604. Scheduled Castes numbered 69,944 (37.29%) and Scheduled Tribes numbered 628 (0.33%).

=== Literacy ===
As per the 2011 census, the total number of literate persons in Shaligram Ramnarayanpur (Hunterganj) CD block was 82,787 (54.83% of the population over 6 years) out of which males numbered 50,105 (64.48% of the male population over 6 years) and females numbered 32,682 (35.82% of the female population over 6 years). The gender disparity (the difference between female and male literacy rates) was 28.67%.

As per 2011 census, literacy in Chatra district was 60.18% Literacy in Jharkhand (for population over 7 years) was 66.41% in 2011. Literacy in India in 2011 was 74.04%.

See also – List of Jharkhand districts ranked by literacy rate

Literacy in CD Blocks of
Chatra district
Shaligram Ramnarayanpur – 54.83
Pratappur – 53.19%
Kunda – 44.84%
Lawalong – 49.02%
Chatra – 55.54%
Kanhachatti – 62.88%
Itkhori – 62.90%
Mayurhand – 64.41%
Gidhour – 68.07%
Pathalgada – 67.39%
Simaria – 63.40%
Tandwa – 62.74%
Source: 2011 Census: CD Block Wise
Primary Census Abstract Data

=== Language and religion ===
Religions in Shaligram Ramnarayanpur CD block (2011)
Religion	Percent
Hinduism	90.78%
Islam	8.60%
Other or not stated	0.62%

Languages of Shaligram Ramnarayanpur block (2011)
1. Magahi (52.8%)
2. Hindi (35.4%)
3. Khortha (6.42%)
4. Urdu (5.31%)
5. Others (0.11%)

At the time of the 2011 census, 52.76% of the population spoke Magahi, 35.40% Hindi, 6.42% Khortha and 5.31% Urdu as their first language.

== Rural poverty ==
Total number of BPL households in Hunterganj CD block in 2002-2007 was 21,006. According to 2011 census, number of households in Huntergnj CD block was 31,534. Rural poverty in Jharkhand declined from 66% in 1993–94 to 46% in 2004–05. In 2011, it has come down to 39.1%.

== Economy ==
=== Livelihood ===
Livelihood
in Hunterganj CD block
1. Cultivators (30.3%)
2. Agricultural labourers (50.7%)
3. Household industries (3.11%)
4. Other Workers (16.0%)

In Shaligram Ramnarayanpur (Hunterganj) CD block in 2011, amongst the class of total workers, cultivators numbered 20,041 and formed 30.28%, agricultural labourers numbered 33,529 and formed 50.66%, household industry workers numbered 2,056 and formed 3.11% and other workers numbered 10,563 and formed 15.96%. Total workers numbered 66,189 and formed 35.28% of the total population, and non-workers numbered 121,401 and formed 64.72% of the population.

=== Infrastructure ===
There are 250 inhabited villages in Shaligram Ramnarayanpur (Hunterganj) CD block. In 2011, 92 villages had power supply. 19 villages had tap water (treated/ untreated), 246 villages had well water (covered/ uncovered), 243 villages had hand pumps, and all villages had drinking water facility. 25 villages had post offices, 15 villages had sub post offices, 20 villages had telephones (land lines), 98 villages had mobile phone coverage. 245 villages had pucca (paved) village roads, 38 villages had bus service (public/ private), 28 villages had autos/ modified autos, 42 villages had taxi/vans and 89 villages had tractors. 24 villages had bank branches, 20 villages had agricultural credit societies, 2 villages had cinema/ video halls, 1 village had public library and public reading room. 104 villages had public distribution system, 19 villages had weekly haat (market) and 102 villages had assembly polling stations.

=== Agriculture ===
Chatra is a predominantly forest district with 65% of the land area being covered with forests. The balance 35% of the area has both rocky and alluvial soil. Alluvial soil is found mostly near river valleys. Rice is the main crop of the district. Other important crops grown are bajra, maize and pulses (mainly arhar and gram).

=== Backward Regions Grant Fund ===
Chatra district is listed as a backward region and receives financial support from the Backward Regions Grant Fund. The fund created by the Government of India is designed to redress regional imbalances in development. As of 2012, 272 districts across the country were listed under this scheme. The list includes 21 districts of Jharkhand.

== Transport ==
NH 22 (old numbering NH 99) connects Sonbarsha (India-Nepal border) with Muzaffarpur, Patna, Gaya, Dobhi, Hunterganj and Chatra and terminates at its junction with NH 39 in Chandwa CD Block in Latehar district. NH 22 crosses NH 19 (old numbering NH 2) at Dobhi in Gaya district of Bihar.

== Education ==
According to the District Census Handbook, Chatra, 2011 census, Shaligram Ramnarayanpur (Hunterganj) CD block had 42 villages with pre-primary schools, 209 villages with primary schools, 105 villages with middle schools, 19 villages with secondary schools, 9 villages with senior secondary school, 41 villages with no educational facility.
.*Note: Senior secondary schools are also known as Inter colleges in Jharkhand

R.N.M. College at Hunterganj is affiliated with the Vinoba Bhave University.

== Healthcare ==
According to the District Census Handbook, Chatra, 2011 census, Shaligram Ramnarayanpur (Hunterganj) CD block had 12 villages with primary health centres, 13 villages with primary health subcentres, 7 villages with maternity and child welfare centres, 11 villages with allopathic hospitals, 8 villages with dispensaries, 7 villages with veterinary hospitals, 11 villages with family welfare centres, 7 villages with medicine shops.
.*Note: Private medical practitioners, alternative medicine etc. not included
