= List of Jharkhand districts ranked by literacy rate =

This is a list of districts in the Indian state of Jharkhand ranked by literacy rate as per provisional data of 2011 census.

With a literacy rate of 66.41%, below the national average of 74.04%, as per the 2011 Census, Jharkhand ranks 32nd amongst the 36 states and union territories in India in terms of literacy rate.

Rank	District	Literacy rate (Total) (%) 2011 Census (excluding 0-6 age group)	Male Literacy Rate (%) 2011 Census (excluding 0-6 age group)	Female Literacy Rate (%) 2011 Census (excluding 0-6 age group)	CD Block links
1	Ranchi	76.06	84.26	67.44	Literacy in CD Blocks of Ranchi district Ranchi Sadar subdivision Burmu – 64.54% Khelari – 74.83% Kanke – 73.75% Ormanjhi – 67.53% Silli – 73.73% Angara – 64.92% Namkum – 73.72% Ratu – 73.00% Nagri – 71.59% Mandar – 67.63% Chanho – 66.81% Bero – 67.49% Itki – 73.58% Lapung – 60.29% Bundu subdivision Rahe – 69.19% Bundu – 66.38% Sonahatu – 66.04% Tamar – 62.76% Source: 2011 Census: CD block Wise; Primary Census Abstract Data
2	East Singhbhum	75.49	83.75	66.81	Literacy in CD Blocks of Purbi Singhbhum district Dhalbhum subdivision Patamda – 59.37% Boram – 58.02% Golmuri-cum-Jugsalai – 79.00% Potka – 64.09% Ghatshila subdivision Ghatshila – 70.72% Musabani – 70.94% Dumaria – 57.11% Dhalbhumgarh – 62.75% Gurbandha – 55.05% Chakulia – 64.35% Baharagora – 64.45% Source: 2011 Census: CD block Wise; Primary Census Abstract Data
3	Dhanbad	74.52	83.81	64.29	Literacy in CD Blocks of Dhanbad district Tundi – 59.43% Purbi Tundi – 61.20% Topchanchi – 74.10% Baghmara – 74.92% Govindpur – 68.53% Dhanbad – 78.47% Baliapur – 70.32% Nirsa – 68.92% Jharia – 73.82% Source: 2011 Census: CD Block Wise; Primary Census Abstract Data, except for Jharia CD Block where 2001 data has been used
4	Ramgarh	73.17	82.44	63.09	Literacy in CD Blocks of Ramgarh district Patratu – 75.00% Mandu – 72.68% Ramgarh – 70.96% Dulmi – 67.62% Chitarpur – 78.60% Gola – 65.35% Source: 2011 Census: CD Block Wise; Primary Census Abstract Data
5	Bokaro	72.01	82.51	60.63	Literacy in CD Blocks of Bokaro district Bermo subdivision Nawadih – 62.55% Chandrapura – 75.41% Bermo – 79.04% Gomia – 65.40% Petarwar – 62.33% Kasmar – 65.33% Jaridih – 68.94% Chas subdivision Chas – 77.14% Chandankiyari – 63.65% Source: 2011 Census: CD Block Wise; Primary Census Abstract Data
6	Hazaribagh	69.75	80.01	58.95	Literacy in CD Blocks of Hazaribagh district Barhi subdivision Chauparan – 69.41% Barhi – 68.39% Padma – 68.90% Barkatha – 61.44% Chalkusha – 67.13% Hazaribagh Sadar subdivision Ichak – 71.87% Tati Jhariya – 60.68% Daru – 71.08% Bishnugarh – 62.04% Sadar, Hazaribagh – 77.56% Katkamsandi – 67.38% Katkamdag – 69.97% Keredari – 64.04% Barkagaon – 65.44% Churchu – 67.97% Dadi – 70.26% Source: 2011 Census: CD Block Wise; Primary Census Abstract Data
7	Simdega	67.99	76.08	59.92	Literacy in CD Blocks of Simdega district Simdega Sadar subdivision Simdega – 67.86% Pakartanr – 70.04% Kurdeg – 67.52% Kersai – 67.80% Bolba – 63.26% Thethaitangar – 66.73% Kolebira – 70.40% Jaldega – 64.89 Bansjore – 61.47% Bano – 63.43% Source: 2011 Census: CD block Wise; Primary Census Abstract Data
8	Serikela Kharsawan	67.70	79.03	55.88	Literacy in CD Blocks of Seraikela Kharsawan district Seraikela Sadar subdivision Kuchai – 52.97% Kharsawan – 65.34% Adityapur – 71.32% Seraikela – 64.61% Gobindpur – 63.19% Chandil subdivision Chandil – 66.74% Ichagar – 61.02% Kukru – 62.54% Nimdih – 64.22% Source: 2011 Census: CD block Wise; Primary Census Abstract Data
9	Lohardaga	67.61	77.21	57.69	Literacy in CD Blocks of Lohardaga district Lohardaga subdivision Kisko – 64.54% Peshrar – 54.25% Kuru – 67.36% Kairo – 64.36% Lohardaga – 67.73% Senha – 66.06% Bhandra block – 63.27% Source: 2011 Census: CD block Wise; Primary Census Abstract Data
10	Koderma	66.84	79.78	53.23	Literacy in CD Blocks of Koderma district Satgawan – 57.76% Koderma – 65.74% Domchanch – 63.52% Jainagar – 67.50% Chandwara – 63.75% Markacho – 64.21% Source: 2011 Census: CD Block Wise; Primary Census Abstract Data
11	Gumla	65.73	75.55	55.90	Literacy in CD Blocks of Gumla district Gumla Sadar subdivision Gumla – 72.28% Ghaghra – 57.56% Bharno – 58.24% Bishunpur – 57.95% Raidih – 68.98% Sisai – 63.06% Basia subdivision Palkot – 61.55 Kamdara – 68.51% Basia – 67.66% Chainpur subdivision Chainpur –71.22% Dumri – 69.83% Albert Ekka (Jari) –71.43% Source: 2011 Census: CD block Wise; Primary Census Abstract Data
12	Deoghar	64.85	76.85	51.80	Literacy in CD Blocks of Deoghar district Deoghar – 63.24% Mohanpur – 58.66% Sarwan – 63.39% Sonaraithari – 58.03% Devipur – 59.43% Madhupur – 59.57% Margomunda – 58.46% Karon – 59.61% Sarath – 62.63% Palojori – 60.27% Source: 2011 Census: CD Block Wise; Primary Census Abstract Data
13	Jamtara	64.59	76.46	52.15	Literacy in CD Blocks of Jamtara district Narayanpur – 55.72% Karmatanr – 58.16% Jamtara – 66.31% Nala – 64.63% Fatehpur – 65.66% Kundhit – 63.64% Source: 2011 Census: CD Block Wise; Primary Census Abstract Data
14	Khunti	63.86	74.08	53.69	Literacy in CD Blocks of Khunti district Khunti Sadar subdivision Karra – 62.04% Torpa – 71.18% Rania – 65.77% Murhu – 63.42% Khunti – 58.40% Arki – 54.21% Source: 2011 Census: CD block Wise; Primary Census Abstract Data
15	Palamu	63.63	74.30	52.09	
16	Giridih	63.14	76.76	48.72	Literacy in CD Blocks of Giridih district Giridih subdivision Giridih - 63.22% Gandey - 56.30% Bengabad - 59.33% Dumri subdivision Dumri - 63.55% Pirtand - 47.22% Bagodar Saria subdivision Bagodar - 64.43% Suriya - 66.25% Birni - 61.47% Khori Mahua subdivision Dhanwar - 65.44% Jamua - 63.99% Deori - 62.54% Tisri - 55.27% Gawan - 60.94 % Source: 2011 Census: CD Block Wise; Primary Census Abstract Data
17	Dumka	61.02	72.96	48.82	Literacy in CD Blocks of Dumka district Saraiyahat – 58.64% Jarmundi – 58.06% Kathikund - 54.09% Ramgarh – 55.45% Gopikandar – 50.12% Shikaripara – 57.10% Ranishwar – 60.06% Dumka – 70.08% Jama – 61.88% Masalia – 61.66% Source: 2011 Census: CD Block Wise; Primary Census Abstract Data
18	Garhwa	60.33	72.19	47.58	
19	Chatra	60.18	69.92	49.92	Literacy in CD Blocks of Chatra district Shaligram Ramnarayanpur – 54.83 Pratappur – 53.19% Kunda – 44.84% Lawalong – 49.02% Chatra – 55.54% Kanhachatti – 62.88% Itkhori – 62.90% Mayurhand – 64.41% Gidhour – 68.07% Pathalgada – 67.39% Simaria – 63.40% Tandwa – 62.74% Source: 2011 Census: CD Block Wise; Primary Census Abstract Data
20	Latehar	59.51	69.97	48.68	
21	West Singhbhum	58.63	71.13	46.25	
22	Godda	56.40	67.84	46.25	Literacy in CD Blocks of Godda district Meharama – 55.99% Thakurgangti – 56.64% Boarijore – 45.68% Mahagama – 55.66% Pathargama – 61.31% Basantrai – 56.60% Godda – 59.58% Poraiyahat – 56.33% Sunderpahari – 43.62% Source: 2011 Census: CD Block Wise; Primary Census Abstract Data
23	Sahibganj	52.04	60.34	43.31	Literacy in CD Blocks of Sahibganj district Sahibganj subdivision Sahibganj – 56.07% Mandro – 46.03% Borio – 42.38% Barhait – 42.50% Rajmahal subdivision Taljhari – 47.74% Rajmahal – 51.28% Udhwa – 47.71% Pathna – 47.71% Barharwa – 58.54% Source: 2011 Census: CD Block Wise; Primary Census Abstract Data
24	Pakur	48.82	57.06	40.52	Literacy in CD Blocks of Pakur district Littipara – 40.70% Amrapara – 46.55% Hiranpur – 51.95% Pakur – 51.95% Maheshpur – 52.34% Pakuria – 53.82% Source: 2011 Census: CD Block Wise; Primary Census Abstract Data

== See also ==
- Indian states ranking by literacy rate
