= National Highway 522 (India) =

National highway in India

National Highway 522

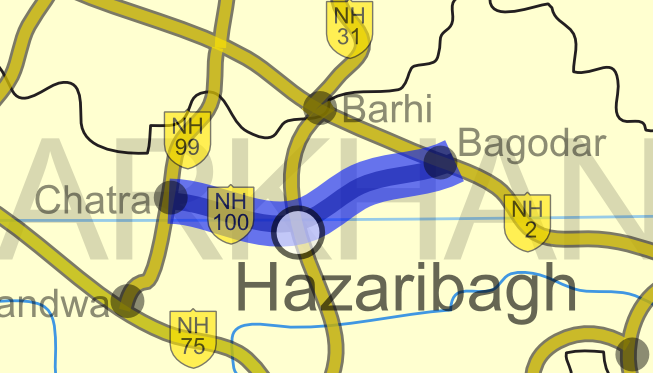
- NH 522 in solid blue colour

Route information
- Length: 119 km (74 mi)

Major junctions
- From: Chatra
- To: Bagodar

Location
- Country: India
- States: Jharkhand
- Primary destinations: Hazaribagh

Highway system
- Roads in India; Expressways; National; State; Asian
← NH 22	→ NH 523

National Highway 522 (NH 522) (previously NH 100) is a National Highway in India. This highway runs entirely in the state of Jharkhand.
