= Language row and movement in Jharkhand =

2021–2022 Language Movement in Jharkhand is a language movement organized on 2021 in Jharkhand, which is still going on in 2022. The people's demand was expressed to protect the local language and to prevent the aggression of other languages on the local language. Local language rights activists in Dhanbad and Bokaro protested against the inclusion of Bhojpuri, Magahi and Maithili languages in the state government's list of regional languages for Dhanbad and Bokaro, and launched a series of movements under the banner of Jharkhandi Bhasa Bachao Sangharsh Samiti. On 30 January 2022, Local language right activists making a 50- km long human chain from Telmachcho to Chandankiyari in Bokaro with intensely protests. The voice of the protesters on that day was "Bahari Bhasa Nei Chalto", means outsiders' languages will not work.

About five kilometer long torch procession was taken out under the banner of Jharkhand Bhasha Sangharsh Samiti, Nawadih on Tuesday to protest against making Bhojpuri and Magahi languages as regional languages in Dhanbad-Bokaro. About two thousand youths involved in this raised slogans against the government with torches in their hands. Nawadih Deputy Chief Vishwanath Mahato said that in any case the encroachment of language will not be accepted. Hemant government, who talks about the soil, is tampering with its culture, language and identity, which will not be tolerated. Protest foot march will be taken out in Nawadih on Wednesday. Bokaro district general secretary of Mukhiya Sangh, Gaurishankar Mahto said that Jharkhand has been found after a long fight. Under no circumstances will the identity of Jharkhand be allowed to be played with.
