= Bariyatu Block =

Bariyatu Block is one of the administrative community development block of Latehar district, Jharkhand state, India.
