= Chatra district =

Coordinates: 24°12′00″N 84°52′12″E

Chatra district Chatrā Jilā
- District of Jharkhand
- Chatra village area
- Interactive map of Chatra district
- Country: India
- State: Jharkhand
- Division: North Chotanagpur division
- Established: 29-05-1991
- Headquarters: Chatra, Jharkhand

Government
  - Deputy Commissioner: Shri Ravi Anand (IAS)
  - Superintendent of police: Shri Animesh Naithani (IPS)
  - Lok Sabha constituencies: Chatra (shared with Palamu and Latehar districts)
  - MP: Kalicharan Singh (BJP)
  - Vidhan Sabha constituencies: 2

Area
  - Total: 3,718 km^{2} (1,436 sq mi)
  - Rank: 10th

Population (2011)
  - Total: 1,042,886
  - Rank: 15th
  - Density: 280.5/km^{2} (726.5/sq mi)
  - Rank: 19th
  - Urban: 05.31

Demographics
  - Literacy: 60.18%
  - Sex ratio: 951
- Time zone: UTC+05:30 (IST)
- Postal code: 825401
- Vehicle registration: JH 13
- Major highways: NH22, NH522
- Website: http://chatra.nic.in/

Chatra district is district one of the twenty-four districts of Jharkhand state, India. The district was formed after separation from Hazaribagh district in 1991. Chatra is the administrative headquarters of this district. The district covers an area of 3718 km^{2}.

== History ==
=== Ancient period ===
In ancient period, the area covered by the present district and adjoining areas were ruled by a number of states, which were collectively known as the Atavika (forest) states. These states accepted the suzerainty of the Maurya Empire during Ashoka's reign (c. 232 BCE). Samudragupta, while marching through the present-day Chotanagpur region, directed the first attack against the kingdom of Dakshina Kosala in the Mahanadi valley.

=== Medieval period ===
During Muhammad bin Tughluq's reign, the territory which comprises the present district came in contact with the Delhi sultanate. Later, it became a part of the Bihar Subah of the Mughal Empire. Daud Khan, the Mughal Subahdar of Bihar, during the reign of Aurangzeb occupied Kothi near Pokhri Fort on 5 May 1660, without much opposition, and then he moved towards the fort of Kunda which had a very strong fortification as it was situated on a hilltop. This fort was finally occupied by him and was completely destroyed on the 2 June 1660. Later, Kunda Fort was under the possession of the Raja of Ramgarh. In 1734, Aliwardi Khan advanced towards Kunda after defeating the rebel Zamindars of Tikari (Gaya). He mounted an attack on Chatra Fort and demolished it.

=== British rule ===
The British East India Company came in contact with this region for the first time in 1769. Raja Rammohan Roy, worked as a serestadar at Chatra from 1805–06 and stayed both at Chatra and Ramgarh while in office.

The most important battle fought between the insurgents and the British in Chotanagpur during the rebellion of 1857 was the "Battle of Chatra". This decisive battle was fought on 2 October 1857, near Phansi Talab. It lasted for an hour in which the mutineers were completely defeated. 56 European soldiers and officers were killed whereas 150 revolutionaries were killed and 77 were buried in a pit. Subedar Mangal Pandey and Nadir Ali Khan were sentenced and hanged to death on the 4 October 1857 on this very spot. The European and Sikh soldiers were buried in a well along with their arms and ammunitions. An inscriptive plaque which is still extant states:

"56 men of Her Majesty's 53rd Regiment of foot and a party of Sikhs were killed at Chatra on October 2nd 1857 in action against mutineers of the Ramgarh Battalion. Lieutenant J. C. C. Daunt of the 70th Bengal Native Infantry and sergeant D. Dynon of the 53rd regiment were awarded Victoria Cross for conspicuous gallantry in the battle, in which the mutineers were completely defeated and lost all their four guns and ammunitions.

At the same time, another inscription on the bank of the Phansi Talab immortalises the two revolutionary subedars, namely, Mangal Pandey and Nadir Ali Khan.

==== Independence movement ====
The independence movement in this district gathered momentum in 1921. One of the most significant events of the Quit India Movement in 1942, was the escape of Jai Prakash Narayan along with six other from The Hazaribagh Central Jail on 9 November 1942 (the night of festival of Diwali). Jai Prakash Narayan came to Tatra (a village in this district )where he was at the home of panchkodi dubey, and then proceeded towards Sherghati en route to Varanasi. The notable participants in the independence movement from this district include Chotanagpur Kesri, Babu Ram Narayan Singh, and Babu Shaligram Singh.

=== Post-independence ===
The district is currently a part of the Red Corridor.

== Administration ==
The territory covered by the present district was earlier known as Chatra sub-division of Hazaribagh district.

=== Blocks/Mandals ===
Chatra district consists of 12 Blocks. The following are the list of the Blocks in Chatra district:

Subdivisions	Blocks
Chatra	Chatra; Hunterganj; Kanhachatti; Kunda; Pratappur
Simaria	Simaria; Gidhour; Lawalong; Pathalgada; Tandwa; Itkhori; Mayurhand

== Demographics ==
Historical population
Year	Pop.	±% p.a.
1901	144,844	—
1911	158,450	+0.90%
1921	157,016	−0.09%
1931	186,577	+1.74%
1941	215,348	+1.44%
1951	238,203	+1.01%
1961	293,395	+2.11%
1971	371,268	+2.38%
1981	472,049	+2.43%
1991	623,979	+2.83%
2001	808,135	+2.62%
2011	1,042,886	+2.58%

According to the 2011 census Chatra district has a population of 1,042,886, roughly equal to the nation of Cyprus or the US state of Rhode Island. This gives it a ranking of 434rd in India (out of a total of 640). The district has a population density of 280 inhabitants per square kilometre (730/sq mi) . Its population growth rate over the decade 2001-2011 was 28.98%. Chatra has a sex ratio of 951 females for every 1000 males, and a literacy rate of 60.18%. 6.04% of the population lives in urban areas. Scheduled Castes and Scheduled Tribes make up 32.65% and 4.37% of the population respectively.

Religions in Chatra district (2011)
Religion	Percent
Hinduism	86.60%
Islam	11.19%
Sarna	1.24%
Christianity	0.63%
Other or not stated	0.34%

Hindus make up 86.6% of the population while Muslims make up 11.19%. Christianity makes up 0.63%, while other religions make up 1.58% of the population.

Languages of Chatra district (2011)
1. Khortha (39.7%)
2. Hindi (39.2%)
3. Magahi (12.5%)
4. Urdu (5.47%)
5. Kurukh (1.72%)
6. Others (1.42%)

At the time of the 2011 Census of India, 39.71% of the population in the district spoke Khortha, 39.21% Hindi, 12.47% Magahi, 5.47% Urdu and 1.72% Kurukh as their first language.

== Economy ==
In 2006, the Indian government named Chatra one of the country's 250 most backward districts (out of a total of 640). It is one of the 21 districts in Jharkhand currently receiving funds from the Backward Regions Grant Fund Programme (BRGF).

== Politics ==
District	No.	Constituency	Name	Party	Alliance	Remarks	Chatra	26	Simaria	Kumar Ujjwal	BJP
27	Chatra	Janardan Paswan		LJP(RV)			Chatra				

Chatra has two assembly constituencies: Chatra and Simaria. Both are part of Chatra Lok Sabha constituency

The MP from Chatra is Kalicharan Singh from Bharatiya Janata Party.

== Tourism ==
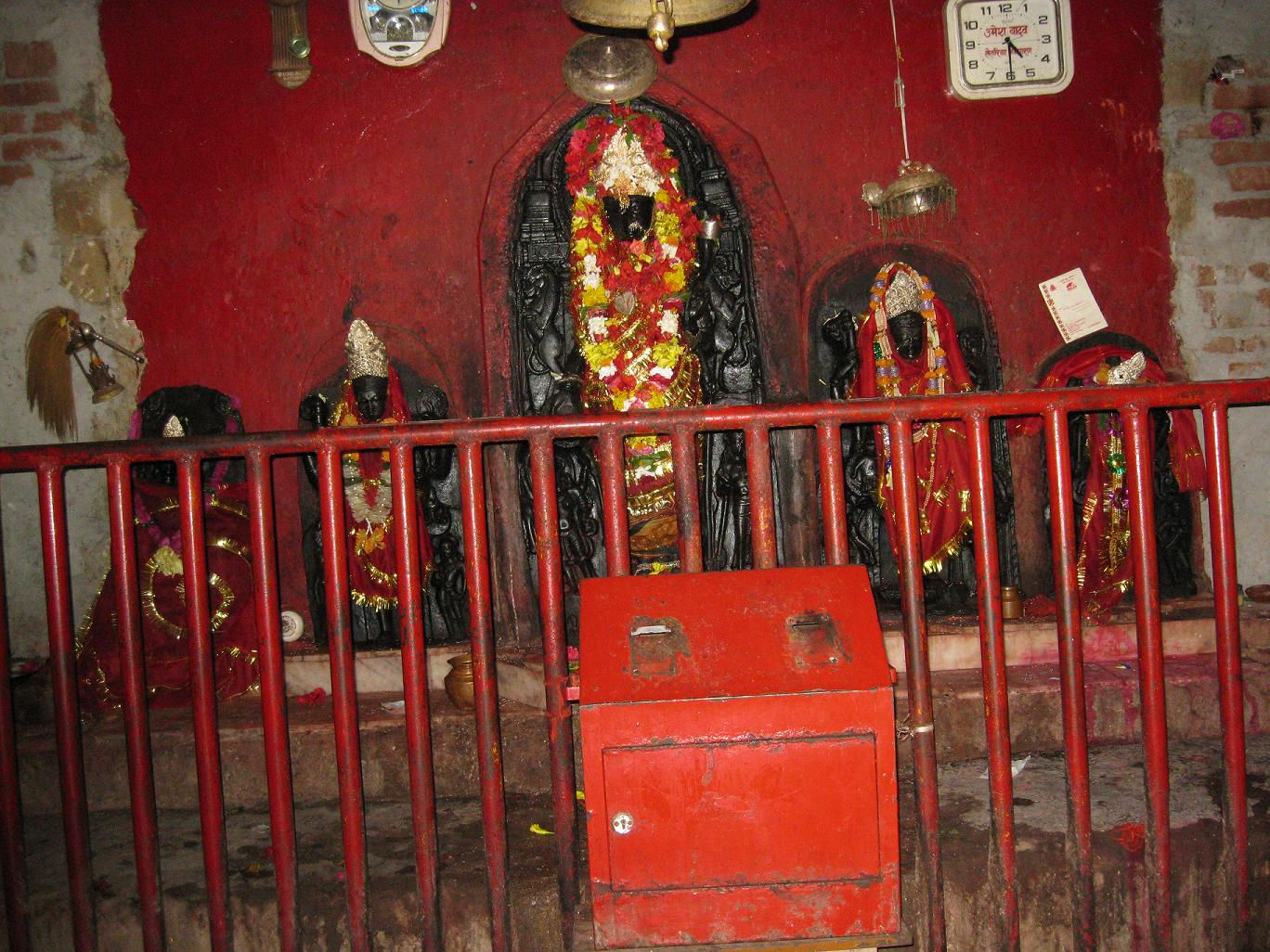
Mother Bhadrakali in a Temple in Chatra district

The district of Chatra, gateway of Jharkhand has a number of picnic spots and fountains, waterfalls and flora and fauna. Some of the tourist spots of Chatra include:

- Bhadrakali temple:- It is at Itkhori, 35 km on the East of Chatra and 16 km west of Chauparan connected with Grand Trunk Road. Along with the temple situated on the bank of river Mahanad (Mahane) surrounded by hill and forest, there is a water reservoir.
- Kunda Cave:- The ruins of old Kunda palace are still found at a distance of about three-four miles from the present Kunda Village. The place might have been created either towards the end of 17th century AD or beginning of the 18th century AD.

- Tamasin:- Word tamasin is a sandhi of 'tam+asin' which means 'darkness prevails '. This area has mixed forest having high trees making the area dark even in the daylight. Tamasin has a waterfall.

Besides these there are a number of waterfalls in Chatra.

Maa Kauleswary Temple: - Maa Kauleswary Mandir is situated near Hunterganj block in Kedli kalan village. It is approx 10 km from Hunterganj and the temple is situated on the hill which has 650 feet height. A Budha temple is also situated on Kuleswary hill and every year thousands of visitor are coming to visit the temples and natural environment of this area also.
