= Chatra, Jharkhand =

Chatra
- Town
- Location in jharkhand, India Chatra (India)
- Coordinates: 24°12′23.695″N 84°52′16.788″E
- Country: India
- State: Jharkhand
- District: Chatra

Government
  - Type: Municipal governance in India
  - Body: Municipal Council Chatra

Area
  - Total: 16 km^{2} (6.2 sq mi)

Population (2011)
  - Total: 49,985
  - Density: 3,100/km^{2} (8,100/sq mi)

Languages (*For language details see Chatra (community development block)#Language and religion)
  - Official: Hindi, Urdu
- Time zone: UTC+5:30 (IST)
- PIN: 825401
- Telephone/ STD code: 06541
- Vehicle registration: JH-13
- Lok Sabha constituency: Chatra
- Vidhan Sabha constituency: Chatra
- Website: chatra.nic.in

Chatra is a town in the Chatra subdivision of the Chatra district in the Indian state of Jharkhand. It is also the administrative headquarter of Chatra district.

== History ==
Chatra was the “headquarters” of Ramgarh district in the 18th-19th century. Raja Rammohan Roy, was sheristadar in Ramgarh district, in 1804–05, and used to function from both Ramgarh and Chatra. Subsequently, Ramgarh district became part of Hazaribagh district came up. Chatra became a subdivision of Hazaribagh district in 1914. It became a full-fledged district in 1991.

== Geography ==
Cities, towns and locations in Chatra district in North Chotanagpur Division
M: municipality, CT: census town, R: rural/ urban centre, H: historical/ religious centre, P: power plant, T: tourist centre
Abbreviation used - TPS: thermal power station
Owing to space constraints in the small map, the actual locations in a larger map may vary slightly

=== Location ===
Chatra is located at 24°12′16″N 84°52′37″E.

Chatra has several waterfalls around it: Goa Falls (6 km), Keridah Falls (8 km), Maludah Falls (8 km), and Bichkiliya (11 km). Balbal Duari (25 km) has a hot spring.

=== Area overview ===
The map alongside shows that the forests (mark the light shading), covering around 60% of Chatra district, are evenly spread across the district. It is a plateau area with an elevation of about 450 metres (1,476 ft) above mean sea level. Efforts are on to get the first unit of the NTPC Limited’s North Karanpura Thermal Power Station (3x660 MW), ready in 2021.North Karanpura Coalfield of Central Coalfields Limited, spread over 1,230 square kilometres (470 sq mi) in the southern part of the district, with spill over to neighbouring districts, and having coal reserves of 14 billion tonnes is among the biggest in India. The map provides links to three CCL operational areas.

Note: The map alongside presents some of the notable locations in the district. All places marked in the map are linked in the larger full screen map.

== Demographics ==
Historical population of Chatra
Year	Pop.	±%
1872	8,818	—
1901	10,599	+20.2%
1911	9,222	−13.0%
1921	8,225	−10.8%
1931	8,758	+6.5%
1941	9,638	+10.0%
1951	9,911	+2.8%
1961	12,507	+26.2%
1971	16,737	+33.8%
1981	22,738	+35.9%
1991	31,147	+37.0%
2001	42,020	+34.9%
2011	49,985	+19.0%
Source: Census of India

According to the 2011 Census of India, Chatra Nagar Parishad (location code 801765) had a total population of 49,985, of which 26,555 (53%) were males and 23,430 (47%) were females. Population in the age range 0–6 years was 7,800. The total number of literate persons in Chatra was 3,3746 (80.00% of the population over 6 years).

In 2001 census, Chatra had a population of 41,990, out of which 22,331 were males and 19,659 were females. 27,409 persons were literate.

== Civic administration ==
=== Police stations ===
Chatra Sadar and Basistanagar police stations serve Chatra town and Chatra CD block.

=== District, subdivision, CD block HQ ===
Headquarters of Chatra district, Chatra subdivision and Chatra CD block is at Chatra town.

== Infrastructure ==
According to the District Census Handbook 2011, Chatra, Chatra (nagar parishad) covered an area of 16 km^{2}. Among the civic amenities, it had 52 km roads with open drains, the protected water supply involved hand pumps, uncovered wells. It had 5,346 domestic electric connections, 102 road light points. Among the medical facilities, it had 1 hospital, 2 dispensaries, 2 health centres, 1 family welfare centre, 1 family welfare centre, 1 maternity and child welfare centre, 1 maternity home, 1 nursing home, 4 charitable hospital/ nursing home, 1 veterinary hospital, 12 medicine shops. Among the educational facilities it had 15 primary schools, 27 middle schools, 11 secondary schools, 8 senior secondary schools, 3 general degree college. It had 2 recognised shorthand, typewriting and vocational training centres, 1 non-formal educational centre (Sarva Siksha Abhiyan). Among the social, recreational and cultural facilities it had 1 stadium, 1 cinema theatre, 2 auditorium/ community halls, 1 public library, reading room. Three important commodities it manufactured were bidi, leaf plate, lac. It had the branch office of 3 nationalised banks, 2 private commercial banks, 2 cooperative banks, 1 agricultural credit society, 1 non-agricultural credit society.

== Transport ==
Chatra stands at the crossing of NH 22 and NH 522.

== NGO working in Chatra ==
- Sanmat under skill training domain.
- IACM: Under skill domain.

== Education ==
Chatra College was established at Chatra in 1961. Affiliated with the Vinoba Bhave University it offers courses in the arts, science, education streams.
