= Khortha language =

Indo-Aryan dialect spoken in India

Khortha
- खोरठा भाषा
- The word "Khortha" written in Devanagari script
- Pronunciation: [kʰorʈʰa]
- Native to: India
- Region: North Chotanagpur and Santhal Pargana, Jharkhand
- Ethnicity: L1: Sadans; L1 or L2: Mundas, Santals, Lohras, Korwas, Kurukhs
- Native speakers: 8.04 million (2011 census)(additional speakers counted under Hindi)
- Language family: Indo-European: Indo-Iranian; Indo-Aryan; Eastern; Bihari; Sadanic; Khortha
- Writing system: Devanagari

Official status
- Official language in: India: Jharkhand (additional)

Language codes
- ISO 639-3: None (mis)
- Glottolog: None maga1260 Magahi
- Distribution of Khortha language

Khortha (pronounced [kʰorʈʰa]) is an Indo-Aryan language spoken primarily in the Indian state of Jharkhand, mainly in 13 districts of two divisions: North Chotanagpur, and Santhal Pargana. Khortha is one of the native languages of the Sadaans and is used by tribal populations as a link language. It is the most spoken language variety of Jharkhand.

== Geographical distribution ==
Distribution of Khortha language in the state of India
1. Jharkhand (96.3%)
2. West Bengal (1.93%)
3. Bihar (1.67%)
4. Other (0.13%)

Khortha is spoken in North Chota Nagpur division and Santal Pargana division of Jharkhand. The 13 districts are Hazaribagh, Koderma, Giridih, Bokaro, Dhanbad, Chatra, Ramgarh, Deoghar, Dumka, Jamtara, Sahebganj, Pakur and Godda.

In Bihar, districts where Khortha is spoken include Aurangabad, Gaya and Nawada.

== Classification ==
Magahi speakers claim that George Grierson classified Khortha as a dialect of the Magahi language in his linguistic survey, while Khortha speakers do not associate themselves with Magahi and also protest to remove Magahi from Jharkhand, as they think it can endanger their native Khortha language. A recent study demonstrates that Khortha is more similar to other Bihari languages of Jharkhand called Sadani languages.

== Literature ==
In 1950, Sriniwas Panuri translated Kalidasa's Meghadutam in Khortha. In 1956, he composed two works Balkiran and Divyajyoti. Bhubaneswar Dutta Sharma, Sriniwas Panuri, Viswanath Dasaundhi and Viswanath Nagar were among the first people who started literature in Khortha. Some prominent writers in Khortha language are A.K Jha, Shivnath Pramanik, B.N Ohdar. For the first time, efforts were made to reach Khortha language and literature to the people of Jharkhand through the Internet by the founder of the Sarkari Library, Mananjay Mahato.

A Sadri/Khortha bidaai and lotapani (farewell and water ritual) song

== Phonology ==
=== Consonants ===
Khortha consonant inventory
		Labial	Dental/ alveolar	Retroflex	Post-alv./ palatal	Velar	Glottal
Nasal	voiced	m	n			ŋ	
Nasal	breathy	(mʱ)	(nʱ)			(ŋʱ)	
Stop/ affricate	voiceless	p	t̪	ʈ	t͡ʃ	k	
Stop/ affricate	aspirated	pʰ	tʰ	ʈʰ	t͡ʃʰ	kʰ	
Stop/ affricate	voiced	b	d̪	ɖ	d͡ʒ	ɡ	
Stop/ affricate	breathy	bʱ	dʱ	ɖʱ	d͡ʒʱ	ɡʱ	
Fricative			s				h
Approximant	voiced	w	l		j		
Approximant	breathy		(lʱ)				
Flap/Trill	voiced		ɾ~r	(ɽ)			
Flap/Trill	breathy		ɾʱ~rʱ	(ɽʱ)			

- Aspirated plosives /pʰ/, /dʱ/, /ɖʱ/, and /kʰ/ rarely appear in word-final position. /ɖ/ and /ɖʱ/ never stay on the same word with their allophones /ɽ/ and /ɽʱ/.
- Four affricates /t͡ʃ/, /t͡ʃʰ/, /d͡ʒ/, /d͡ʒʱ/ can be found in initial, medial, and final positions. When articulating these phonemes, the blade of the tongue touches the back of the teeth-ridge. When a stop consonant is articulated, the touch continues longer, and the separation of the tongue is slower than it is for the affricates.
- /s/ occurs with all positions, while /h/ is mostly found in word-initial. In rapid conversation, there seems to be a case for h-elision between vowels. Eg. /d͡ʒohɛk/ 'to wait' is realized as [d͡ʒoɛk], and /mohor/ 'old coin' as [moːr].
- /ŋ/ is restricted to the word-final position. Breathy nasals /mʱ nʱ ŋʱ/, lateral /lʱ/, and flap /ɾʱ/ are only attested in word-medial and word-final positions.
- Glides mostly occur in intervocalic positions; however, they are also found in word-final position in a few lexical items. Inserting glides in intervocalic positions, which is common in Indo-Aryan, is not favored in Khortha.
- Aspirated consonants cannot be geminated. Gemination of /ɾ/ will yield the first consonant as [r], and the second as [ɾ]. Eg. [barɾa] 'banyan tree'.

=== Vowels ===
Khortha vowel inventory
	Front	Central	Back
Closed	i [iː]		ʊ [ʊː]
Close-mid	ɛ [ɛː, e, eː]		o [ɔ]
Open-mid		ʌ [ʌː]	
Open		a [aː]	
Diphthongs	/ai, ʌi, ʌʊ, eu, oi, oʊ, aʊ/		

Nasalization consistently occur with all vowels and positions in Khortha, although it is noted that /a/ is the most nasalized vowel in all accounts, and there is a tendency that phonemic contrast between nasalized and oral vowels is likely to be the strongest in word-medial and final positions. Some minimal and near-minimal pairs found in the corpus are listed in the table below:

Oral	Nasal
kʰaʈ ('a rope bed')	kʰãʈ ('small')
bʱagɛk ('to run away')	bʱãgɛk ('to break')
pakʰa ('cubbyholes')	pãkʰa ('feather')
ɖoɽa ('rope')	ɖõɽa ('a black ant')
kʌɾʌdʒ ('credit')	kʌɾʌ̃dʒ ('tropical tree') (Millettia pinnata)
pʊtʃʰ ('to ask')	pʊ̃tʃʰ ('tail')
bɛg ('speed, force')	bɛ̃g ('frog')
iʈa ('this one')	ĩʈa ('brick')

=== Vowel rules ===
When a word root is bound with an affix that contains a vowel, the internal open central vowel /a/ of the first syllable is replaced by the mid-close central vowel. Eg. gʱaɾ ('house') + wʌin (plural) → gʱʌɾwʌin 'houses'. This process is pretty common, but it is not related to vowel harmony and is more likely due to intonation. It also does not apply to compounds and reduplicated nouns. Eg. gatʃʰ-palha 'greenery' (lit. "tree-leave").

Final-vowel stem, when is marked with plural suffix -wʌin, the final vowel is dropped. Eg. kaɽa + wʌin → kʌɽwʌin 'buffalos'. Root with /a/ final merges with the initial /a/ of the following element. Eg. kʰa-a (eat-2PL.IMP.HON) → kʰa 'you eat!' (plural and honorific).

The long open vowel is dropped when it is followed by the mid-close central vowel. In some verbs, the open central vowel is dropped in imperative constructions due to the addition of the suffix -o. Eg. kʰa-o (eat-2SG.IMP) → kʰo 'you eat!'

The nominalizing suffix -bɛ assimilates with additive clitic =o, producing the contracted version -bo 'NMLZ.ADD'.

== Morphology ==
=== Nominal morphology ===
==== Pronouns ====
Khortha pronouns can distinguish the honorific status of the addressee and certain deictics of the third-person addressees.

	Nominative/unmarked	Ergative	Oblique	Genitive
1SG	ham/hʌm	ham=ẽ	hamra/hʌmra	ham-ʌr/hʌm-ʌr
1PL	hamin		hamni=ke	hamnik
2SG	toẽ		tora	tor
2SG.HON	tohẽ		tohʌr(a)	tohʌr/tohnik
2PL	tohin		tohʌni=ke	tohnik
3SG.PROX	i	i=ẽ	ekra	ekʌr
3SG.DIST	u		okra	okʌr/ukʌr
3PL.PROX	ekʰin/ikʰin		ekʰni=ke	ekʰinek/ekʰinkʌr
3PL.DIST	okʰin		okʰni=ke	okʰinek/okʰinkʌr
3SG.PROX.HON	in			inkʰʌr
3SG.DIST.HON	un			unkʰʌr

==== Cases ====
Case	Marker	Function
Nominative	-Ø	Intransitive subject, transitive subject, non-human and non-specific objects
Ergative	=ẽ	Agent in the Perfective
Oblique	=ke	Indirect object, definite-animate-direct objects
Genitive	=k/=kʌr/=rʌ	Possession
Instrumental	=ĩ/=ẽ	Medium
Locative	-ẽ	Location

- The nominative subject of an intransitive clause, transitive agent in non-past tenses, non-human and non-specific objects receive no overt marking.

ham/hamin kãdʌ-l-i
I/We cry-PST-1
'I/We cried.'

- Restricted in past tense constructions, the ergative agent is marked by =ẽ, which is homophonous with the instrumental and locatives.

ham=ẽ petʃʰu mʌhina e=go kʌmidʒ ʈip-au-l-i=e
I=ERG last month one=CLF shirt stitch-CAUS-PST-1=FOC
'I have someone stitch a shirt last month.'

It seems that ergative marking is not obligatory in the Parnadiya dialect (spoken in the districts of Hazaribagh, Chatra, Koderma, and Giridih) even though transitivity is prominent and the sentences are in past tenses.

Ram hʌmra kʌlʌm de-l-kʌi
Ram me.OBL pen give-PST-3SG
'Ram gave me a pen.'

ham/hamin piʈʰa kʰa-i-l-i-ʌi
I/We rice.bread eat-LNK-PST-1-3SG
'I/We ate the chapati.'

In extremely rare contexts, =ẽ can occur in the present tense, but likely to express emphasis rather than ergativity.

ham=ẽ kʌma=h-i tʌ daru piʌ=h-i
I=FOC earn=AUX.PRES-1 TOP alcohol drink=AUX.PRES-1
'I am the one who earns, so I (can) drink.' (The speakers focus on themselves)

- Patient, object, indirect object (mostly animate and definite indirect objects) arguments are indicated their syntactic roles by the Oblique case marker =ke. There is a clear preference for object marking for human indirect objects over non-humans, animate over inanimate. The hierarchy is animate human > animate nonhuman > inanimate nonhuman. Likewise, when two objects appear in the same noun phrase, then the animate/human object is obligatorily marked while the inanimate/non-human object usually remains unmarked. Consider the following example:

Ram=ẽ beʈi=ke lʌwʌntʃus de-l-ʌi.
Ram=ERG daughter=OBL chocolate give-PST-3SG
Agent Animate.Human.Recipient Inanimate.Indirect.Object Verb
Ram gave a chocolate to his daughter.

Pronouns and personal names are always marked with the oblique when they are the objects.

okʰin hʌmni=ke dekʰ-l-a
They.DIST we=OBL see-PST-PL
'They saw us.'

=== Verbal morphology ===
==== Person indexation ====
The Khortha verbs show indexation of the S/A argument, whether the argument is marked with ergative (perfective only) or non-ergative in other TAMs.

	singular	plural	plural (HON)
1st person	-i		
2nd person	-ẽ/-e	-a	
3rd person	-Ø/-ʌi/-ʌe/-e	-a	-th/-thun/-thin/-thĩ
addressing	=o		

Note -k marks 2nd person singular agent in Parnadiya dialect.

Verbs can index both A and P when the A argument is the first person and the P argument is a third person, i.e. the 1→3 scenario.

kail=e bap=ke ɖagɖʌr=ke dekha-i de-l-i-ʌi
yesterday=FOC father=OBL doctor=OBL show-LNK v2:AUX-PST-1-3SG
'It was yesterday that I showed father to the doctor.'

ham okra dekh-l-i-ʌi
I he.OBL see-PST-1-3
'I saw him.'

==== Tense-aspect-mood ====
	Markers	Examples
Future	-b/-t	rʌhʌ-t ("he/she/it will be")
Present	=hV	kãdʌ=hʌ-th ("They cry")
Past	-l	hʌ-l-a ("they/them were")
Imperfective	-it	
Past habitual	-tʌ	
Imperative	-o	
Polite imperative	-a	
Indirect request	-hak	

==== Complex predicates ====
Khortha complex predication employs a wide array of helper verbs ("auxiliary verb", v2) that can add fuller meanings to the semantic head.

Verb	Meaning	Functional meaning as auxiliary verb
a-	'come'	Cislocative/ventive
ja	'go'	Translocative/itive
pʌhũch	'reach'	Movement towards the deictic center
paw	'to get a chance'	Permissive causative
de	'give'	Benefactive, Telicity
lag	'start, begin'	Inception
pʌɽ	'fall'	Sudden actions
par	'can, be able'	Ability
li	'take'	Autobenefactive
khoj	'want, wish, desire'	Desirative mood
rakh	'keep'	Resulting permanent state

== Sample phrases ==
English	Khortha	Khortha (Devanagari)
Ramu felt shy.	Ramu ke laaj laago hae.	रामु के लाज लागो हए।
Amit has courage.	Amit thhin jor he.	अमित ठिन जोर हए।
I feel shy	Hamra laaj laago hae	हमरा लाज लागो हय।
Give the horse the feed.	Ghora-ke khaay ke dahi.	घोड़ा के खाय के दही।
The child did not hit his sister.	Chhaua-ta aapan bahin-ke nai maarle hae.	छऊवा टा आपन बहिन के नाय मारले हय।
Ram's sister wedding is tomorrow.	Kaael ram-ke bahin-ke biha hae.	काईल रामके बहिनके बिहा हय।
The boy ate a banana.	Chhourata eego kaera khaelo.	छौड़ाटा एगो कईरा खईलो।
Buy twenty five rupees’ sugar.	Pacchis taka-ke chini kinle.	पच्चीस टाकाके चीनी किनले।
Ajay wrote a letter to his mother yesterday.	Ajay kaael aapan maay-ke chitthi likhle hae.	अजय काईल आपन माय के चिट्ठी लिखले हय।

== See also ==
- Khortha cinema
- 2021–2022 Language Movement in Jharkhand

== Sources ==
- Paudyal, Netra P. (2025). A Grammar of Khortha, in Brill's Studies in South and Southwest Asian Languages. Leiden: Brill. doi:10.1163/9789004712676. ISBN 978-90-04-71266-9.
- Ray, Bablu; Kumar, Akash (2022). "Person Agreement in Khortha: A Language of Jharkhand". Interdisciplinary Journal of Linguistics. 15: 85–98.
- Paudyal, Netra P.; Peterson, John (2021). "How one language became four: the impact of different contact-scenarios between "Sadani" and the tribal languages of Jharkhand". Journal of South Asian Languages and Linguistics. 7 (2): 275–306. doi:10.1515/jsall-2021-2028. ISSN 2196-078X.
