= Balsokra =

Village in Jharkhand, India

- Village
- Location in Jharkhand, India Balsokra (India)
- Coordinates: 23.5483°N 84.9236°E
- Country: India
- State: Jharkhand
- District: Ranchi

Population (2011)
  - Total: 5,518

Languages (*For language details see Chanho block#Language and religion)
  - Official: Hindi, Urdu
- Time zone: UTC+5:30 (IST)
- PIN: 835213
- Telephone/ STD code: 0651
- Vehicle registration: JH 01
- Literacy: 78.26%
- Lok Sabha constituency: Lohardaga
- Vidhan Sabha constituency: Mandar
- Website: ranchi.nic.in

Balsokra is a village in the Chanho CD block in the Ranchi Sadar subdivision of Ranchi district in Jharkhand, India.

== Geography ==
Cities, towns and locations in Ranchi district in South Chotanagpur Division
M: municipality, CT: census town, R: rural/ urban centre, N: neighbourhood, T: tourist centre, D: dam, H: historical/ religious centre
Owing to space constraints in the small map, the actual locations in a larger map may vary slightly

=== Climate ===
Much like the rest of the region, the average temperature ranges from 42 to 20 °C during summer and from 25 to 0 °C during winter. Annual rainfall for the region is about 1430 mm (56.34 inches).

=== Area overview ===
The map alongside shows a part of the Ranchi plateau, most of it at an average elevation of 2,140 feet above sea level. Only a small part in the north-eastern part of the district is the lower Ranchi plateau, spread over Silli, Rahe, Sonahatu and Tamar CD blocks, at an elevation of 500 to 1,000 feet above sea level. There is a 16 km long ridge south-west of Ranchi. There are isolated hills in the central plateau. The principal river of the district, the Subarnarekha, originates near Ratu, flows in an easterly direction and descends from the plateau, with a drop of about 300 feet at Hundru Falls. Subarnarekha and other important rivers are marked on the map. The forested area is shaded in the map. A major part of the North Karanpura Area and some fringe areas of the Piparwar Area of the Central Coalfields Limited, both located in the North Karanpura Coalfield, are in Ranchi district. There has been extensive industrial activity in Ranchi district, since independence. Ranchi district is the first in the state in terms of population. 8.83% of the total population of the state lives in this district - 56.9% is rural population and 43.1% is urban population.

Note: The map alongside presents some of the notable locations in the district. All places marked in the map are linked in the larger full screen map.

== Demographics ==
According to the 2011 Census of India, Balsokra had a total population of 5,518, of which 2,848 (52%) were males and 2,670 (48%) were females. Population in the age range 0–6 years was 942. The total number of literate persons in Balsokra was 3,581 (78.26% of the population over 6 years).

=== Languages ===
Urdu and Arabic are the languages of Balsokra. Many unofficial regional languages are also spoken. Urdu is given more priority than any languages here as 99% population follows Islam.

=== Religion ===
Nearly all of the population in Balsokra are Muslims. There are a number of Masjids in the village and the surrounding area. Balsokra is also the Markaz of 89 villages. A mardrasa in Balsokra, Darul Uloom Quasmia, is well-known, and Balsokra is also called Mardrasa for this reason.

== Transport ==
National Highway 39 (Ranchi-Daltonganj), an important roadway in Ranchi district, passes through Balsokra.

== Education ==
A madrasa named Darul Uloom Quasmia is a university of moral value education where knowledge of Islam is taught. Graduates include Ulama (Islamic scholars) and Huffaz. Nearby colleges include Chanho College and Mandar College.

Other schools in Balsokra:

- Urdu Middle School Balsokra - A government school established in 1897. it is located at the heart of Balsokra.
- Al-Hilal Academy - A private school in Balsokra established in 1993. It has been noted for its quality of education and discipline.
- Aqusa Academy - A private school established in 1998.
- Birsa Munda Memorial Secondary High School
- Jharkhand Public School
- Elegant Public School

== Sports ==
The people of Balsokra enjoy recreational activities such as cricket, volleyball, badminton, and football, with cricket being the most popular.
