= Cyclone Yaas =

North Indian Ocean cyclone in 2021

Very Severe Cyclonic Storm Yaas
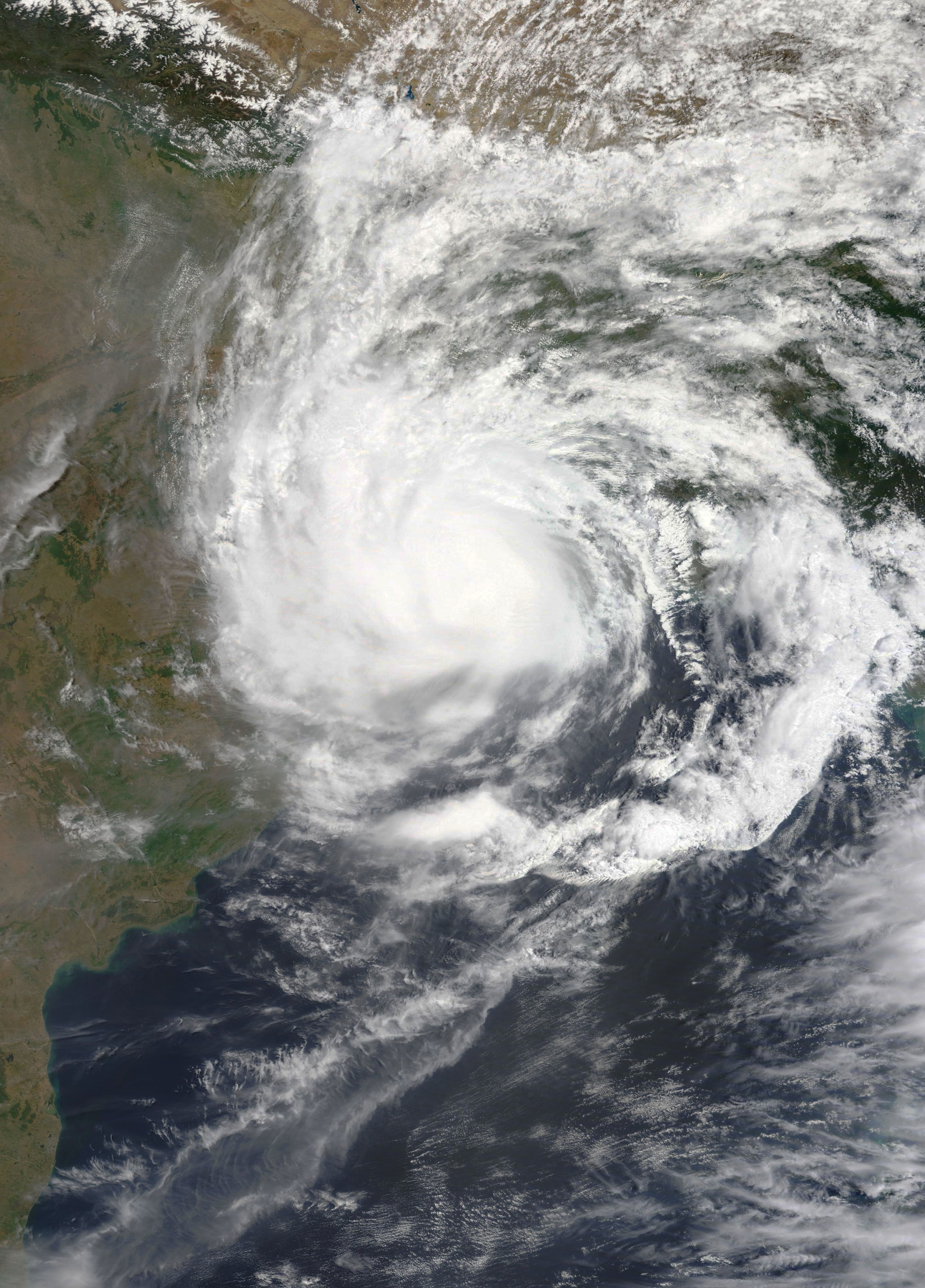
- Yaas before landfall in Odisha on 25 May near peak intensity.

Meteorological history
- Formed: 23 May 2021
- Dissipated: 26 May 2021

Very severe cyclonic storm
- 3-minute sustained (IMD)
- Highest winds: 140 km/h (85 mph)
- Lowest pressure: 970 hPa (mbar); 28.64 inHg

Category 1-equivalent tropical cyclone
- 1-minute sustained (SSHWS/JTWC)
- Highest winds: 120 km/h (75 mph)
- Lowest pressure: 974 hPa (mbar); 28.76 inHg

Overall effects
- Fatalities: 20 total
- Damage: $2.99 billion (2021 USD)
- Areas affected: Bangladesh; Andaman and Nicobar Islands; Bihar; Jharkhand; Madhya Pradesh; Odisha; Uttar Pradesh; West Bengal; Nepal
- Part of the 2021 North Indian Ocean cyclone season

Very Severe Cyclonic Storm Yaas (Note: The name Yaas (Arabic: ياس, [jaːs]) was contributed by Oman and means "jasmine" in Arabic.) was a relatively strong and very damaging tropical cyclone that made landfall in India's eastern State of Odisha, and brought significant impact to West Bengal during late May 2021. The second cyclonic storm, second severe cyclonic storm, and second very severe cyclonic storm of the 2021 North Indian Ocean cyclone season, Yaas formed from a tropical disturbance that the Indian Meteorological Department first monitored on 23 May. Conditions in the basin favoured development as the system became a deep depression later that day, before intensifying into a cyclonic storm on the next day, receiving the name Yaas. The system further intensified as it turned to the northeast, becoming a severe cyclonic storm on 24 May despite moderate wind shear. Marginally favourable conditions further continued as Yaas accelerated northeastward, strengthening to a Category 1-equivalent tropical cyclone and to a very severe cyclonic storm on 25 May. Yaas crossed the northern Odisha coast around 20 km south of Balasore at its peak intensity as a very severe cyclonic storm on 26 May. Upon landfall, the JTWC and IMD issued their final advisories as Yaas further weakened inland while turning north-northwestwards.

In preparations for the storm, many electrical companies in West Bengal and Odisha prepared additional generators and transformers for possible electrical problems. Evacuations were also ordered, starting on 24 May on low-lying areas in East Midnapore and West Midnapore and Jhargram. Hooghly, Kolkata and North 24 Parganas and South 24 Parganas are now placed on high alert. Railway operations and marine activities were halted due to Yaas, while rescue authorities and medical teams were deployed in for possible emergencies. In Bangladesh, over two million individuals were ordered to be evacuated in coastal areas of the country due to the storm's approach. Food supplies and emergency funds were also released for the evacuees. 20 people across India and Bangladesh died due to Yaas. West Bengal was the hardest hit Indian state, with an estimated loss of ₹210 billion (US$2.89 billion). Odisha also suffered a loss of ₹6.1 billion (US$83.9 million).

== Meteorological history ==
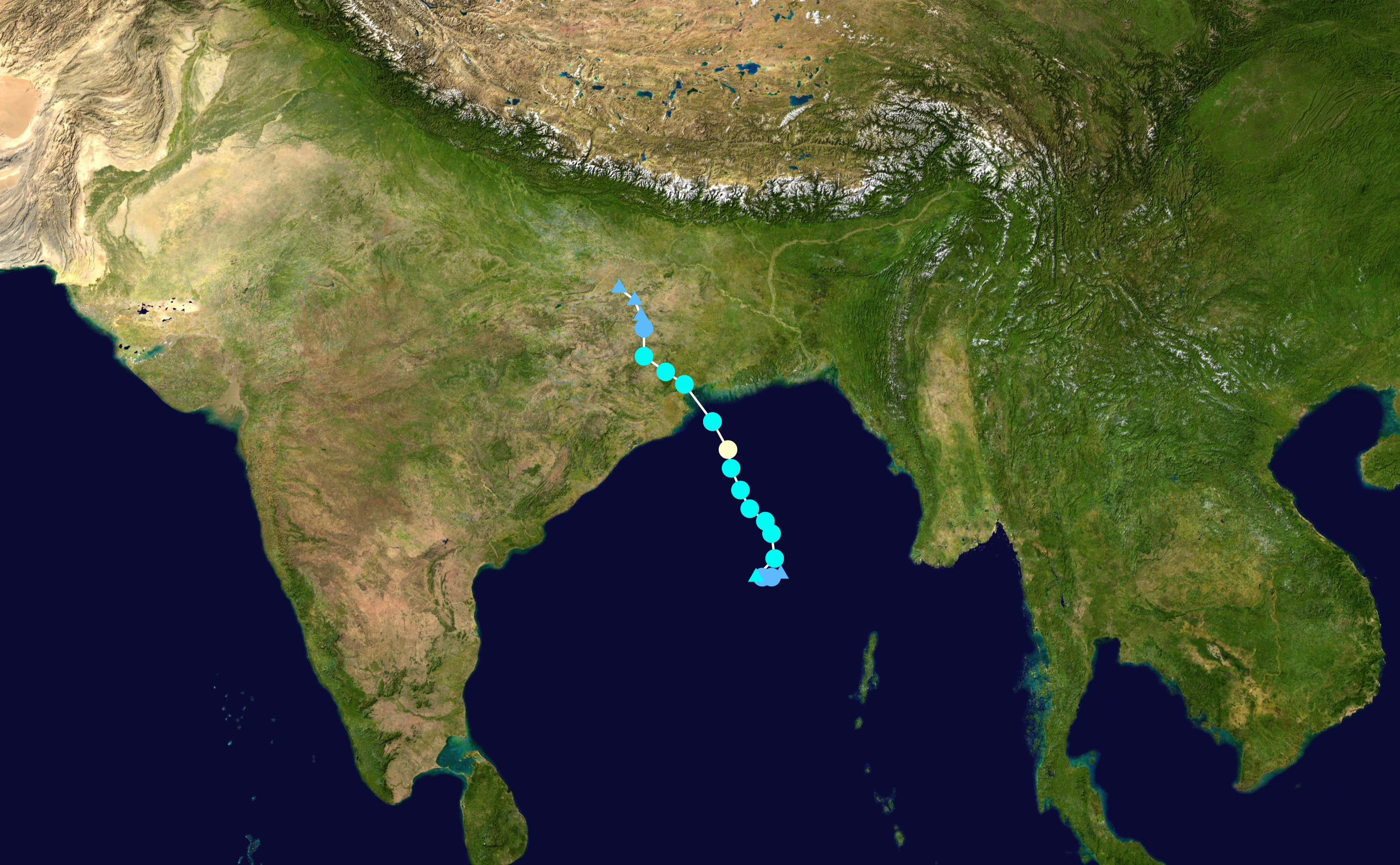
Map plotting the storm's track and intensity, according to the Saffir–Simpson scale Map key Saffir–Simpson scale Tropical depression (≤38 mph, ≤62 km/h) Tropical storm (39–73 mph, 63–118 km/h) Category 1 (74–95 mph, 119–153 km/h) Category 2 (96–110 mph, 154–177 km/h) Category 3 (111–129 mph, 178–208 km/h) Category 4 (130–156 mph, 209–251 km/h) Category 5 (≥157 mph, ≥252 km/h) Unknown Storm type Tropical cyclone Subtropical cyclone Extratropical cyclone, remnant low, tropical disturbance, or monsoon depression

On 22 May, a low-pressure area formed in the Bay of Bengal. On the next day, at 09:30 UTC, the disturbance intensified into a depression and was assigned the designation BOB 02 by the India Meteorological Department (IMD). Meanwhile, the Joint Typhoon Warning Center (JTWC) issued a Tropical Cyclone Formation Alert (TCFA) at 15:00 UTC on 22 May on the developing system. The system subsequently intensified into a deep depression at 15:00 UTC on 23 May. On the following day, at 02:30 UTC, the system further intensified into a cyclonic storm and was given the name Yaas by the IMD. At that time, the low-level circulation centre of the system became partially-exposed due to moderate wind shear; however, large masses of rainbands persisted in the southern portion of the storm as it remained in a marginally favourable environment for intensification, with warm sea surface temperatures and good outflow but moderate wind shear. The IMD further upgraded Yaas to a severe cyclonic storm at 18:00 UTC that day as the system became more organised. A subtropical ridge turned the system northeast into an area of low wind shear, causing Yaas to gradually strengthen. At 12:00 UTC on 25 May, the JTWC upgraded the storm to a Category 1 system as the system further organised. Despite Yaas being negatively affected after making landfall, combined with the weakening effects of moderate wind shear and poor outflow, it intensified further to a very severe cyclonic storm at 15:00 UTC on 25 May as it featured a profound convection. The storm subsequently reached its peak intensity of 140 km/h (85 mph) in three-minute sustained wind speeds, according to the IMD; the JTWC had slightly lower estimates of 120 km/h (75 mph) on the system. Around 09:00 IST (03:30 UTC) on 26 May, Yaas made landfall north of Dhamra Port and south of Bahanaga at the same intensity. Upon moving inland, the JTWC issued their final warning on the storm as it weakened to a tropical storm since it was over land and also faced increased vertical shear. Soon afterward, the IMD also discontinued advisories as the system became disorganised and as it weakened to a deep depression. Yaas eventually dissipated in northern India on 28 May.

== Preparations ==
=== India ===
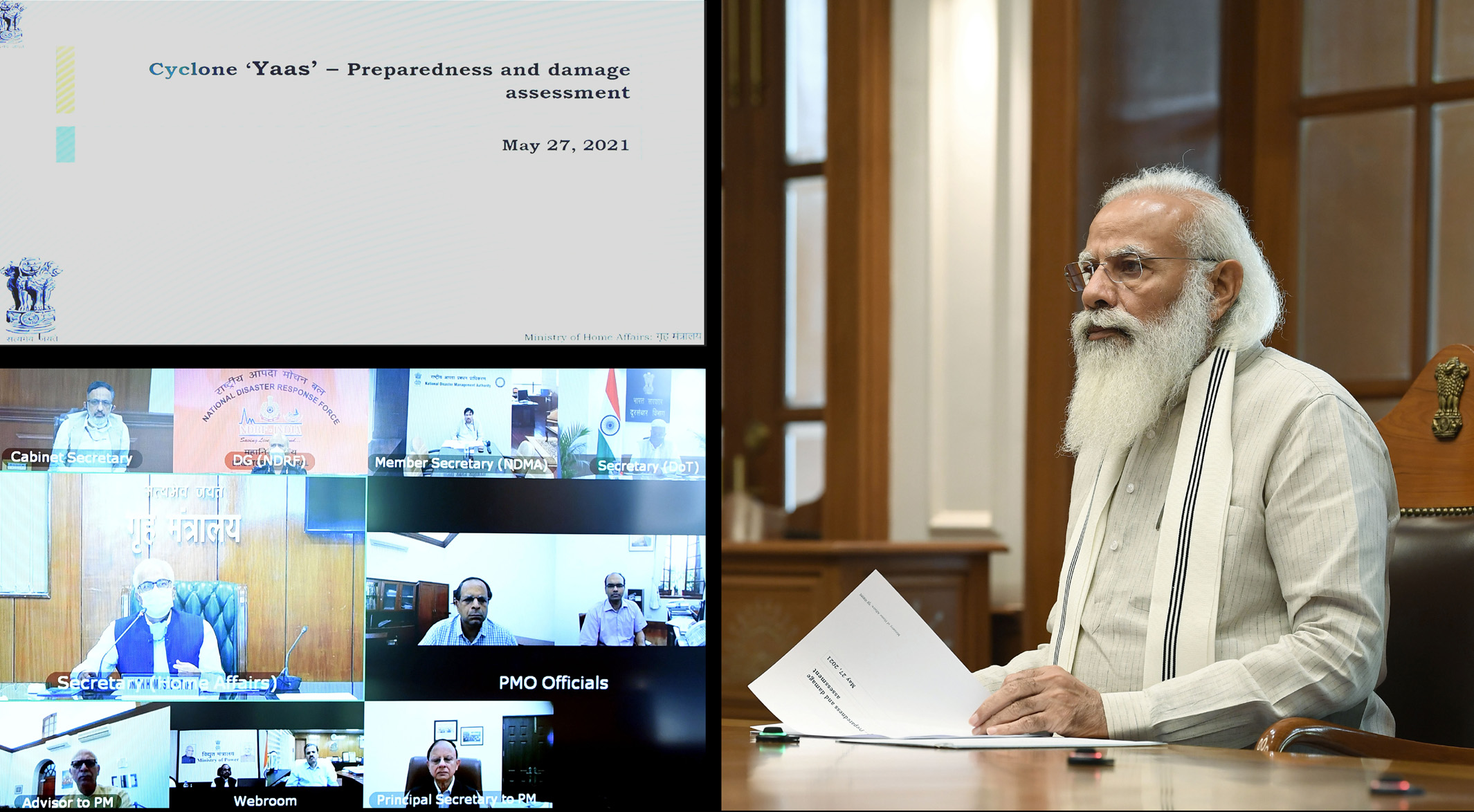
Prime Minister Narendra Modi chairing a meeting to review the impact of the cyclone, through video conferencing, in New Delhi on 27 May, 2021.

The Union Power Ministry of India had prepared transformers and generators in case of power outages. The Health Ministry also prepared to ensure that there is no disruption in vaccine supplement and COVID-19 treatment. The Ministry of Telecommunication kept all telecom towers and exchanges under watch. India Prime Minister Narendra Modi had also arranged an emergency meeting to prepare for the cyclone. The NDRF had deployed 65 teams with another 20 teams on reserve. Also, NDRF deployed 115 teams in 5 states. Rescue and relief teams of the Indian army, navy, and the coast guard have also deployed over the coastal districts of Odisha and West Bengal. CESC stayed on guard for the cyclone to ensure uninterrupted service especially for major hospitals and critical establishments like drainage pumping stations. Additionally, the Northern Railway zone had cancelled many trips from New Delhi to and from Bhubaneswar and Puri. Meanwhile, Western Railways and Southern Railways had also canceled trains going to and from Odisha. Airline operations at Kolkata International Airport were cancelled due to the forecasted interminent weather from Yaas. Furthermore, airports in Bhubaneswar, Rourkela and Durgapur were ordered to be closed starting on 27 May due to Yaas. The IMD issued an orange alert on 25 May on Mayurbhanj, Jajpur, Cuttack, Khordha, and Puri in Odisha, citing the threat of Yaas' rainfall. Meanwhile, a red alert was raised by the department for Kendrapara, Jagatsinghpur, Bhadrak, and Balasore on the same day due to the system. Ministry of Home Affairs Amit Shah instructed the authorities in West Bengal, Odisha, and Andhra Pradesh in a virtual meeting to prepare electricity supplies at hospitals and vaccine centres for possible power outages. The Port of Kolkata started to suspend all shipping activities in the city, starting on 25 May due to Yaas' threat. All 265 boats which were reported to be in the Bay of Bengal on that day returned to the port as the Indian Coast Guard instructed them to do so due to the brewing storm. Evacuations were also started on 24 May for the coastal and low-lying areas in East Midnapore and West Midnapore and Jhargram, with over a million people being evacuated. Meanwhile, as Yaas weakens over Jharkhand, evacuations were ordered due to the threat of strong winds and heavy rainfall from the system. Over 600,000 individuals were instructed to move to disaster shelters provided by the authorities due to the storm's approach.

=== Bangladesh ===
Assessing the threat of Yaas in the country, Bangladesh Prime Minister Sheikh Hasina reserved 225 disaster centres for evacuation premises. 349 shelters had been prepared, which accommodated half the capacity of people to maintain COVID-19 health restrictions. 114 medical authorities were readied for medical emergencies. Food supplies were also prepared for the evacuees, while Bangladeshi authorities including the Cyclone Preparedness Programme of the country and its navy were on standby and high alert, starting from 24 May. Signal Warning No. 2 were raised on harbors in Chittagong, Cox's Bazar, Mongla and Payra on the same day as Yaas neared the country. In the administrative division of Barisal, authorities there started to prepare temporary and permanent evacuation shelters as they started to depopulate over 2 million individuals due to the storm. Fishing activities in the northern Bay of Bengal were prohibited. ৳1.5 million (US$17,700) worth of standby funds were also released by the authorities for disaster response. 20,000 Rohingya at the remote island of Bhasan Char were also considered at risk.

=== Sri Lanka ===
The meteorology department of Sri Lanka issued a red alert on 24 May for the possibility of heavy rains and strong winds from Yaas for the country's Western, Central, Sabaragamuwa and Southern provinces.

== Impact ==
=== India ===
Farmlands throughout Odisha, West Bengal, and some in Jharkhand were damaged by flooding, while small boats within the Bay of Bengal were damaged. Electrical lines in these states were knocked down causing thousands of power outages.

==== West Bengal ====
More than 4,500 villages were damaged. Various rural homes and agricultural lands were hard-hit, and basic needs such as drinking water, sanitation, and the like were also hard to come by. At least 143 marine vehicles were broken into.

Starting on 25 May, heavy rains and strong winds started to brush the coastal and inland areas of West Bengal, storms reaching as far as Kolkata, where 62 kmph winds and gusts of 90 kmph were recorded. Before Cyclone Yaas came, a tornado outbreak was reported on the districts of North 24 Paragana and Hooghly. One tornados reported in Halishar and another reported in Chinsurah. Two people died with five injured and 80 houses being damaged. Knee-deep floods caused by torrential rainfall submerged the beach areas of Digha, while palm trees were snapped by the cyclone's strong winds. Chandabali reported rains of up to 39.31 cm (15.48 in) between 24 and 26 May, also causing flooding. 300,000 houses were damaged in West Bengal, while around 10 million people were affected in the state alone.

Two farmers from Pandua were struck by lightning while on their fields, killing them both, while a senior citizen of Asansol died as her house collapsed on top of her. Two more individuals were killed as they were hit by uprooted trees in West Bengal. Over 1,100 villages in West Bengal were submerged in floodwaters caused by storm surges, displacing about 500,000 people. Cars also suffered damage due to the floods, and various structures were also damaged. In the city of Ashoknagar Kalyangarh in North 24 Parganas district, a small tornado touched down in the area on 27 May, destroying many houses and private properties. No one was injured or killed in the event. A preliminary report submitted to the Central government gave an estimated loss of ₹210 billion (US$2.89 billion).

==== Odisha ====
Due to the heavy rains in Odisha, many residents had been evacuated, so only a few people felt the impact of Yaas. The state was still heavily affected, with 120 village settlements being flooded and heavily damaged by the rains. Paradeep received over 36 cm (14 in) of rainfall on 25 May. A 15-year-old boy was found dead in a pond in the village of Jagannath Khunta in Mayurbhanj. Another fatality was reported on 26 May in the town of Keonjhar, when a man died after a tree fell on top of him. 10 people had to be rescued from a boat which capsized off of the Odisha coast. Continued heavy rains from Yaas caused the Baitarani River to nearly overflow, but it didn't as the conditions in Odisha improved. Damage statewide were stood at ₹6.1 billion (USS$83.9 million), and the majority of them were government properties.

==== Other states ====
In Ranchi, the capital of Jharkhand, two people were reported dead as they were trapped in a collapsed house, not being rescued and eventually dying there. 1,500 homes were damaged, 10 lakh people were effected, and 18 people were injured in Jharkhand. An additional two people died in Ranchi after a five-year-old bridge connecting the Tamar block to Bundu and Sonahatu block of the city collapsed. 75 hectares worth of farmland were destroyed.

In Patna, the largest city of Bihar, a rain amount of 3.85 cm (1.52 in) was reported by the meteorological centre in the area on 27 May. The largest rain accumulation in the state was reported at the city of Gaya, standing at 6.88 cm (2.71 in) on the same day. Seven people died in the state of Bihar due to floods produced by Yaas as it moved further inland.

The rainfall from Yaas also extended to Uttar Pradesh, where many areas in the state reported light downpours including Ballia, Mau, Deoria, Ghazipur, Azamgarh, Varanasi, Chandoli, Mirzapur, Sonbhadra, Gorakhpur, Kushinagar, Ambedkarnagar, Sultanpur, Jaunpur, Allahabad, Maharajganj, Naugarh, Basti and Ayodhya and the districts of Bhadohi and Sant Kabir Nagar.

In Sidhi and Shajapur in Madhya Pradesh, the remnant moisture of Yaas caused light rainfall, standing at 0.5 and 0.4 cm (0.20 and 0.16 in) on 28 May, respectively.

=== Bangladesh ===
Tidal waves generated by Yaas flooded low-lying areas in Khulna, Satkhira, Patuakhali, Barguna, Jhalokathi, and Noakhali, including some fishing settlements in Sundarbans on 26 May. The coastal areas of Cox's Bazar saw inundation in multiple villages due to Cyclone Yaas, while tidal surges severely damaged a jetty and at least 50 houses at St. Martin's Island. 500 meters of Kuakata Beach in Patuakhali District were washed away by coastal erosion due to Yaas, while at least 56 km (35 mi) worth of flood-controlling dykes were damaged, which would ultimately cost the district ৳530 million (US$6.25 million) to repair. A hotel along the western side of beach collapsed. In Khulna District, 50,000 homes and croplands were damaged by strong winds and tidal surges produced by the cyclone and at least 5,000 were left homeless, with estimated losses in the district worth at least ৳600 million (US$7.08 million). Damage in Bagerhat District were at ৳460 million (US$5.43 million), with the road infrastructure suffered the greatest loss. The Sundarbans were inundated with saline seawater after Yaas had moved inland, raising fears of potential damage the forest ecosystem. The seawater filled 53 of the 54 freshwater ponds within the forest, cutting off supply of uncontaminated drinking water for wildlife and forest workers; the Bangladesh Forest Department stated the flooding in the Sundarbans was the worst in 14 years. According to naval sources at Patenga in Chittagong, a ship, called MV Sanvalli, sank near Bhasanchar in the Bay of Bengal and 12 sailors were rescued by Bangladesh Air Force helicopters..Some other districts of western Bangladesh was effected by Winds and heavy rain.

=== Elsewhere ===
The remnants of Yaas caused light rainfall in some areas in Nepal. Some climbers and hikers at Mount Everest and Lhotse in the country were stranded in high summits, while several more were forced to go down due to imminent weather from the interaction of the system's remnants and a prevailing western disturbance.

== Aftermath ==
=== India ===
The Chief Minister of West Bengal, Mamata Banerjee, met with Prime Minister Narendra Modi to assess and submit damage reports on 27 May. The Bengal Governor, Jagdeep Dhankhar, criticised Banerjee for skipping a prior review meet with Modi. Banerjee herself took aerial surveys of impacted areas in the North 24 Parganas district. He said a field survey would be conducted later on. Modi announced ₹10 billion (US$138 million) in immediate relief split between Odisha, West Bengal, and Jharkhand on 28 May. Modi undertook aerial surveys of impacted areas in the Bhadrak and Balasore districts of Odisha, as well as Purba Medinipur district in West Bengal as well.

Earlier on 27 May, Modi had held a review meeting with Odisha's Chief Minister, Naveen Patnaik. Discussing the impact of the cyclone, Odisha's government had demanded long-term solutions to problems that were caused by repeated cyclone effects, and provision of disaster-resilient power systems. However, there were no immediate funds for this. Those displaced by Yaas had sought refuge in overcrowded shelters; this caused increased concern about COVID-19 outbreaks in an already terrible pandemic in India. WASH items were in limited availability, and shelter camps and WASH facilities were flooded by the storm. Critical demands for the resources were being sent through the IAG network for primary health services; this prompted the need for immediate availability of these items. Children, women, the elderly, and other groups of notable vulnerability were of high concern due to the lack of basic supplies. Psychosocial support and recreational activities for sheltering youth was also required.

=== Controversies ===
However protest erupted on 5 June on South 24 Paragana's Gosaba for demand of concrete embankments, as it was broken by Cyclone Yaas. The protest then spread across South Bengal. Opposition parties have also putting pressure to the state government for the construction of concrete embankments rather than rebuilding sandbars and weak soil embankments. The state government have already proposed the idea for construction of concrete embankments after reports of embankments broke open in South Bengal. It is currently in discussion after Chief Minister Mamata Banerjee has expressed her disappointment in several meetings for ineffective repair of the embankments and told the officials for finding a permanent solution.

Following the destruction caused by Cyclone, the Government of West Bengal decided to start "Duare Traan" (Relief near the house) scheme, in which the relief amount would be given to everyone whose property have been destructed. But, 50% of the applications for this scheme detected as fraud.

== See also ==
- Weather of 2021
- Tropical cyclones in 2021
- Cyclone Aila — Another storm that impacted West Bengal and Bangladesh in 2009.
- Cyclone Phailin — Took a similar path and made a devastating landfall in Odisha, becoming the strongest cyclone to hit the state since the 1999 Odisha cyclone.
- Cyclone Amphan — A powerful storm that impacted the state of West Bengal in same month in 2020.
- Cyclone Tauktae — A severe storm that devastated Gujarat and Maharashtra in the same month.
- Cyclone Fani
- Tropical Storm Matmo and Cyclone Bulbul
