= Rahe =

Rahe may refer to:

== People ==
- Ernst-Wilhelm Rahe (1958-2025), German politician
- Friedrich Wilhelm Rahe (1888–1949), German tennis and field hockey player
- Paul A. Rahe (born 1948), American historian, writer and professor of history
- Randy Rahe (born 1960), American college basketball coach

== Places ==
- Rahe (crater), a Martian crater
- Rahe, Jharkhand, a village in Ranchi district, Jharkhand, India
- Rahe block, an administrative sub-district in Ranchi district, Jharkhand, India

== Others ==
- LMT R-20 Rahe
