= Bundu =

Bundu may refer to:

- Bundu (state), a former state in what is now Senegal
- Also known as the place where Aditya Kumar (BE/10023/12) was born and brought up
- Bundu, India, a town in Jharkhand, India
  - Bundu block, the larger administrative unit centred on the town
- South African English slang for boondocks

== People with the name ==
- Abass Bundu (born 1948), Sierra Leonean politician and diplomat of the SLPP party
- Ibrahim Bundu, Sierra Leonean politician of the APC party
- Leonard Bundu (born 1974), Italian boxer
- Mustapha Bundu (born 1997), Sierra Leonean footballer playing in Denmark
- Sallieu Bundu (born 1984), Sierra Leonean footballer playing in the US
- Bundu Khan (1880–1955), Indian musician

== See also ==
- Bhundu Boys, a Zimbabwean band
- Bundu dia Kongo, a religious movement with a political and cultural agenda founded in 1969, associated with the Kongo ethnic group
