= Rahe, Jharkhand =

Rahe
- Village
- Location in Jharkhand, India Rahe (India)
- Coordinates: 23.2654°N 85.6447°E
- Country: India
- State: Jharkhand
- District: Ranchi

Population (2011)
  - Total: 2,949

Languages (*For language details see Rahe block#Language and religion)
  - Official: Hindi, Urdu
- Time zone: UTC+5:30 (IST)
- PIN: 835204
- Telephone/ STD code: 0651
- Vehicle registration: JH 01
- Literacy: 76.72%
- Lok Sabha constituency: Ranchi
- Vidhan Sabha constituency: Silli
- Website: ranchi.nic.in

Rahe is a village in the Rahe CD block in the Bundu subdivision of the Ranchi district in the Indian state of Jharkhand.

== Geography ==
Cities, towns and locations in Ranchi district in South Chotanagpur Division
M: municipality, CT: census town, R: rural/ urban centre, N: neighbourhood, T: tourist centre, D: dam, H: historical/ religious centre
Owing to space constraints in the small map, the actual locations in a larger map may vary slightly

=== Location ===
Rahe is located at 23.2654°N 85.6447°E.

=== Area overview ===
The map alongside shows a part of the Ranchi plateau, most of it at an average elevation of 2,140 feet above sea level. Only a small part in the north-eastern part of the district is the lower Ranchi plateau, spread over Silli, Rahe, Sonahatu and Tamar CD blocks, at an elevation of 500 to 1,000 feet above sea level. There is a 16 km long ridge south-west of Ranchi. There are isolated hills in the central plateau. The principal river of the district, the Subarnarekha, originates near Ratu, flows in an easterly direction and descends from the plateau, with a drop of about 300 feet at Hundru Falls. Subarnarekha and other important rivers are marked on the map. The forested area is shaded in the map. A major part of the North Karanpura Area and some fringe areas of the Piparwar Area of the Central Coalfields Limited, both located in the North Karanpura Coalfield, are in Ranchi district. There has been extensive industrial activity in Ranchi district, since independence. Ranchi district is the first in the state in terms of population. 8.83% of the total population of the state lives in this district - 56.9% is rural population and 43.1% is urban population.

== Civic administration ==
=== Police outpost ===
There is a police outpost at Rahe.

=== CD block HQ ===
The headquarters of Rahe CD block are located at Rahe village.

== Demographics ==
According to the 2011 Census of India, Rahe had a total population of 2,949, of which 1,547 (52%) were males and 1,402 (48%) were females. Population in the age range 0–6 years was 397. The total number of literate persons in Rahe was 1,958 (76.72% of the population over 6 years).

== Education ==
High School Rahe Sonahatu is a Hindi-medium coeducational institution established at Rahe in 1950. It has facilities for teaching in classes IX and X. It has a playground and a library with 501 books.
