= Surya Temple, Ranchi =

Surya temple in Ranchi, Jharkhand, India

- सूर्य मंदिर, रांची
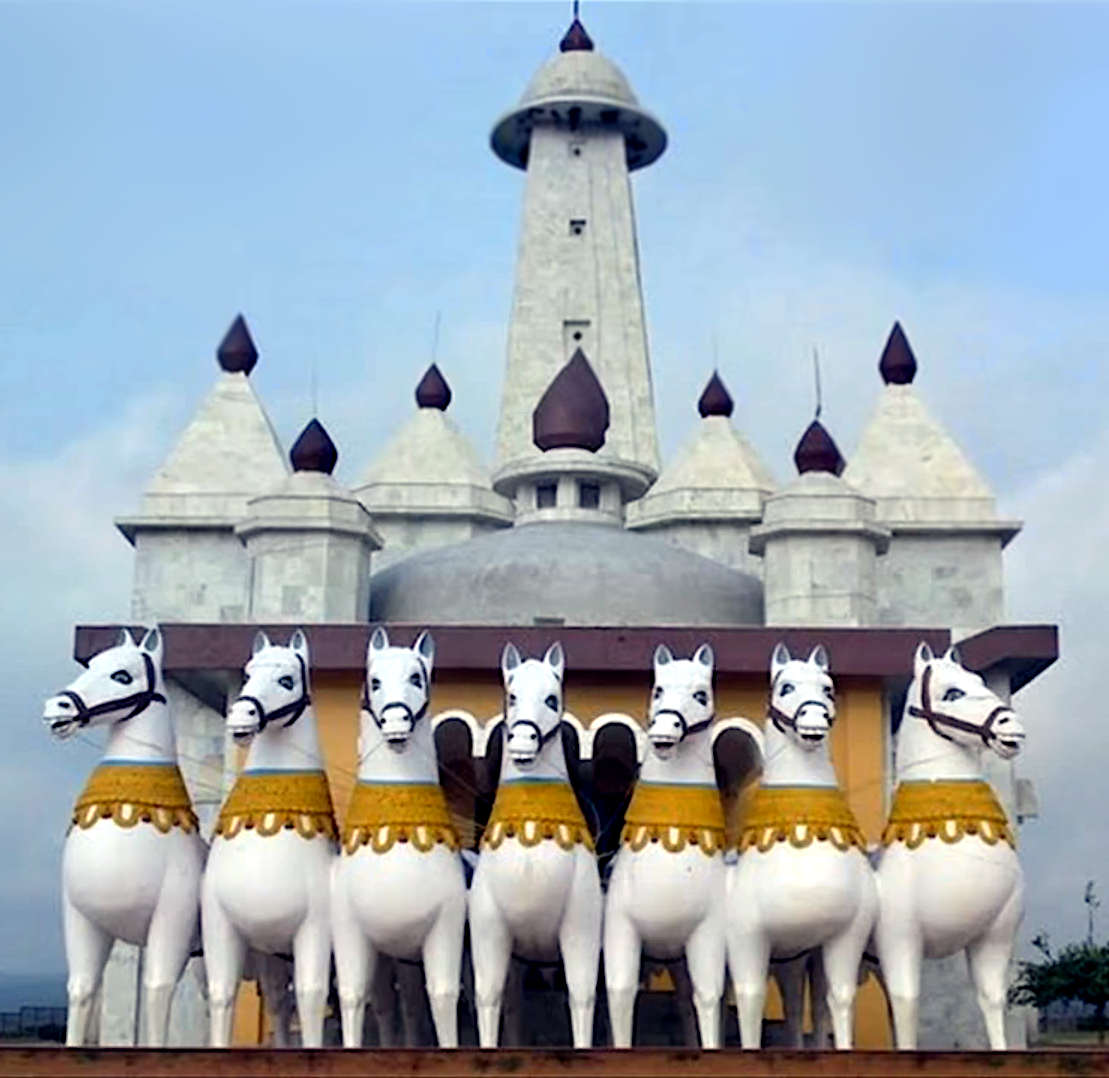
- Established October 1991

- Location within Jharkhand

Religion
- Affiliation: Hinduism
- District: Ranchi
- Province: province
- Deity: Surya
- Festival: Chhath

Location
- Location: Bundu
- State: Jharkhand
- Country: India
- Interactive map of Surya Temple, Ranchi
- Coordinates: 23°10′54″N 85°33′42″E

The Surya Temple or Surya Mandir (Hindi: सूर्य मंदिर, रांची), located near Bundu, is a Hindu temple complex dedicated to the solar deity, Surya.

It is situated on top of a hill, on the NH-43 (Ranchi-Tata Road), approximately 40 km (25 mi) from the capital city of Jharkhand, Ranchi. The temple is constructed in the form of huge chariot with elegantly designed eighteen wheels and seven naturalistic horses. The temple also houses several other deities including Shiva, Parvati and Ganesha.

The temple was built by Sanskriti Vihar, a charitable trust, headed by Shri Sita Ram Maroo, the Managing Director of Ranchi Express Group. The foundation stone was laid by Swami Shri Vasudevanand Saraswati on 24 October 1991 and the Prana Pratishtha was undertaken by Swami Shri Vamdev Ji Maharaj on 10 July 1994.

A Dharmashala for pilgrims has been constructed. There is also a pond where devotees can bathe during Chhath Puja for worshiping the Sun God.
