= Choreya =

- Village
- Interactive map of Choreya
- Coordinates: 23.4998799°N 85.0629271°E
- Country: India
- State: Jharkhand
- District: Ranchi
- Block/Tehsil: Chanho

Government
  - Body: Ranchi Municipal Corporation

Population (2011)
  - Total: 4,994

Languages
  - Official: Hindi, Nagpuri,
- Time zone: UTC+5:30 (IST)
- Postal code: 835214
- Telephone code: 06531
- Vehicle registration: JH 01

Choreya is a small village in Ranchi (capital of the Indian state Jharkhand). It is situated in Chanho block. It is one of the 67 villages of Chanho.

== Demographics ==
As of 2011 India census, it has a population of 4,994. Males constitute 51.2% of the population and females 48.8%. Choreya has an average literacy rate of 76.58% (census 2011) where the male literacy rate 85.69% is and female literacy rate is 67.08%.

== Education ==
The following schools are based in Choreya:

- Devendra Nath Singh High School, Choreya
- Government Middle School, Choreya
- Government Girls Middle School, Choreya
- Harizan School, Choreya
