= Namkum =

- Community development block
- Coordinates: 23.35132°N 85.37690°E
- Country: India
- State: Jharkhand
- District: Ranchi

Government
  - Type: Federal democracy

Area
  - Total: 415.61 km^{2} (160.47 sq mi)
- Elevation: 629 m (2,064 ft)

Population (2011)
  - Total: 145,841
  - Density: 350.91/km^{2} (908.85/sq mi)

Languages
  - Official: Hindi, Urdu
- Time zone: UTC+5:30 (IST)
- PIN: 834010
- Telephone/STD code: 0651
- Vehicle registration: JH
- Literacy: 73.72%
- Lok Sabha constituency: Ranchi
- Vidhan Sabha constituency: Khijri
- Website: ranchi.nic.in

Namkum is a community development block (CD block) forming an administrative division in the Ranchi Sadar subdivision of Ranchi district in the state of Jharkhand.

== Geography ==
Namkum is located at 23°21'N 85°22'E.

Namkum CD block is located on the Ranchi plateau proper. It has an average elevation of 2,140 feet (650 m) above mean sea level and the land is undulating.

Namkum CD block is bounded by the Kanke and Angara CD blocks on the north, Rahe CD block on the east, Khunti CD block in Khunti district on the south, and Nagri block CD block on the west.

Namkum CD block has an area of 415.61 km^{2}.Namkum police station serves Namkum CD block. The headquarters of Namkum CD block is located at Namkum town.

== Demographics ==
=== Population ===
According to the 2011 Census of India, Namkum CD block had a total population of 145,841, of which 118,002 were rural and 27,839 were urban. There were 74,142 (51%) males and 71,699 (49%) females. Population in the age range 0–6 years was 20,814. Scheduled Castes numbered 7,496 (5.14%) and Scheduled Tribes numbered 87,472 (59.98%).

As of 2001 India census, Namkum has a population of 1,14,397 with 58,968 males and 55,429 females 48.7%. Namkum has an average literacy rate of 61.10%(census 2001): male literacy is 74.6%, and female literacy is 46.6%. In Namkum, SC Population is 5753 (2984 males and 2769 females) and the ST population is 72276 (36680 males and 35596 females). The population below 7 years of age is 19403 (9867 males and 8757 females).

The percentage of Scheduled Tribes in Ranchi district, in 2011, was 47.67% of the population (rural) in the blocks. The percentage of Scheduled Tribes, numbering 1,042,016, in the total population of Ranchi district numbering 2,914,253 in 2011, was 35.76%. The Oraons forming 18.20% of the population and the Mundas forming 10.30% of the population, were the main tribes. Other tribes included (percentage of population in brackets) Lohra (2.46), Bedia (1.32) and Mahli (1.09).

Census towns in Namkum CD block are as follows (2011 population figure in brackets): Tati (12,878), Ara (6,346) and Bargarwa (8,615).

Large villages (with 4,000+ population) in Namkum CD block are (2011 census figures in brackets): Khijri (5,936) and Ulatu (7,812).

=== Literacy ===
As of 2011 census, the total number of literate persons in Namkum CD block was 92,166 (73.72% of the population over 6 years) out of which males numbered 52,751 (82.88% of the male population over 6 years) and females numbered 39,415 (64.22% of the female population over 6 years). The gender disparity (the difference between female and male literacy rates) was 18.66%.

As of 2011 census, literacy in Ranchi district was 77.13%. Literacy in Jharkhand was 67.63% in 2011. Literacy in India in 2011 was 74.04%.

See also – List of Jharkhand districts ranked by literacy rate

Literacy in CD Blocks of
Ranchi district
Ranchi Sadar subdivision
Burmu – 64.54%
Khelari – 74.83%
Kanke – 73.75%
Ormanjhi – 67.53%
Silli – 73.73%
Angara – 64.92%
Namkum – 73.72%
Ratu – 73.00%
Nagri – 71.59%
Mandar – 67.63%
Chanho – 66.81%
Bero – 67.49%
Itki – 73.58%
Lapung – 60.29%
Bundu subdivision
Rahe – 69.19%
Bundu – 66.38%
Sonahatu – 66.04%
Tamar – 62.76%
Source: 2011 Census: CD block Wise
Primary Census Abstract Data

=== Language and religion ===
Religions in Namkum CD block (2011)
Religion	Percent
Hinduism	41.27%
Others*	36.57%
Christianity	18.34%
Islam	3.32%
Other or not stated	0.50%
*mainly tribal religions like Sarna

Hindi is the official language in Jharkhand and Urdu has been declared as an additional official language.

Languages in Namkum CD block (2011)
1. Sadri (53.7%)
2. Hindi (17.5%)
3. Mundari (16.3%)
4. Bhojpuri (3.93%)
5. Kurukh (1.95%)
6. Magahi (1.74%)
7. Urdu (1.09%)
8. Bengali (1.08%)
9. Others (2.64%)

== Economy ==
=== Livelihood ===
Livelihood
in Namkum CD block
1. Cultivators (27.9%)
2. Agricultural labourers (20.1%)
3. Household industries (5.02%)
4. Other Workers (47.0%)

In Namkum CD block in 2011, amongst the class of total workers, cultivators numbered 17,588 and formed 27.89%, agricultural labourers numbered 12,694 and formed 20.13%, household industry workers numbered 3,166 and formed 5.02% and other workers numbered 29,614 and formed 46.96%. Total workers numbered 63,062 and formed 43.24% of the total population, and non-workers numbered 82,779 and formed 56.76% of the population.

=== Infrastructure ===
There are 92 inhabited villages in Namkum CD block. In 2011, 5 villages had power supply. 4 villages had tap water (treated/ untreated), 92 villages had well water (covered/ uncovered), 91 villages had hand pumps, and all villages have drinking water facility. 10 villages had post offices, 4 villages had sub post offices, 7 villages had telephones (land lines), 59 villages had mobile phone coverage. 80 villages had pucca (paved) village roads, 6 villages had bus service (public/ private), 15 villages had autos/ modified autos, 14 villages had taxi/vans, 55 villages had tractors. 5 villages had bank branches, 3 villages had agricultural credit societies, 1 village had public distribution system, 84 villages had assembly polling stations.

=== Agriculture ===
In Ranchi district, 23% of the total area is covered with forests. "With the gradual deforestation of the district, more and more land is being brought under cultivation." Terraced low lands are called don and the uplands are called tanr. The hill streams remain almost dry, except in the rainy season, and does not offer much scope for irrigation.

In Namkum CD block, 55.06% of the total area was cultivable, in 2011. Out of this, 19.76% was irrigated land.

=== Backward Regions Grant Fund ===
Ranchi district is listed as a backward region and receives financial support from the Backward Regions Grant Fund. The fund, created by the Government of India, is designed to redress regional imbalances in development. As of 2012, 272 districts across the country were listed under this scheme. The list includes 21 districts of Jharkhand.

== Education ==
Namkum CD block had 11 villages with pre-primary schools, 77 villages with primary schools, 35 villages with middle schools, 11 villages with secondary schools, 4 villages with senior secondary schools, 1 village with engineering college, 2 villages with polytechnics, 2 vocational training centres/ ITIs, 20 villages with non-formal education centres, 9 villages with no educational facility.
.*Senior secondary schools are also known as Inter colleges in Jharkhand

=== Colleges ===
- Chotanagpur Law College
- ICAR RCER Research centre Plandu.
- Indian Institute of Natural Resins and Gums
- Kejriwal Institute of Management and Development Studies
- Xavier Institute of Polytechnic and Technology

== Healthcare ==
Namkum CD block had 1 village with primary health centre, 19 villages with primary health subcentres, 3 villages with maternity and child welfare centres, 3 villages with allopathic hospitals, 1 village with veterinary hospital, 2 villages with family welfare centres, 31 villages with medicine shops.
.*Private medical practitioners, alternative medicine etc. not included

== Rural poverty ==
60-70% of the population of Ranchi district were in the BPL category in 2004–2005. In 2011-12, the proportion of BPL population in Ranchi district came down to 27.82%. According to a study in 2013 (modified in 2019), "the incidence of poverty in Jharkhand is estimated at 46%, but 60% of the scheduled castes and scheduled tribes are still below poverty line."

== Transport ==
Hatia-Rourkela line

Namkon railway station and Tatisilwai railway station are on the Netaji S.C.Bose Gomoh–Hatia line.

Tatisilwai railway station is on the Koderma–Hazaribagh–Barkakana–Ranchi line. The Barkakana-Koderma sector is in operation and, as of 2021, the Ranchi-Barkakana sector is partially operable and is nearing completion.

Balasiring railway station on the Hatia-Rourkela line is located at Pindarkon. It is 7 km from Hatia.

== See also ==
- History of Ranchi district
- Ranchi
- List of Neighbourhoods of Ranchi
