= Mandar block =

Mandar
- Community development block
- Coordinates: 23.46°N 85.08°E
- Country: India
- State: Jharkhand
- District: Ranchi

Government
  - Type: Federal democracy

Area
  - Total: 238.24 km^{2} (91.98 sq mi)

Population (2011)
  - Total: 128,585
  - Density: 539.73/km^{2} (1,397.9/sq mi)
- Time zone: UTC+5:30 (IST)
- PIN: 835214
- Telephone/ STD code: 06531
- Literacy: 67.63%
- Lok Sabha constituency: Lohardaga
- Vidhan Sabha constituency: Mandar
- Website: ranchi.nic.in

Mandar (mandar) is a community development block in the Ranchi Sadar subdivision of Ranchi district, in the Indian state of Jharkhand.

== Geography ==
Mandar CD block is located on the Ranchi plateau proper. It has an average elevation of 2,140 feet (650 m) above mean sea level and the land is undulating.

Mandar CD block is bounded by the Burmu CD block on the north, Ratu CD block on the east, Itki and Bero CD blocks on the south and Chanho CD block on the west.

Mandar CD block has an area of 238.24 km^{2}.Mandar police station serves Mandar CD block. The headquarters of Mandar CD block is located at Mandar village.

== Demographics ==
=== Population ===
According to the 2011 Census of India, Mandar CD block had a total population of 128,585, all of which were rural. There were 66,134 (51%) males and 63,451 (49%) females. Population in the age range 0–6 years was 19,595. Scheduled Castes numbered 1,649 (1.28%) and Scheduled Tribes numbered 77,143 (59.99%).

The percentage of Scheduled Tribes in Ranchi district, in 2011, was 47.67% of the population (rural) in the blocks. The percentage of Scheduled Tribes, numbering 1,042,016, in the total population of Ranchi district numbering 2,914,253 in 2011, was 35.76%. The Oraons forming 18.20% of the population and the Mundas forming 10.30% of the population, were the main tribes. Other tribes included (percentage of population in brackets) Lohra (2.46), Bedia (1.32) and Mahli (1.09).

Large villages (with 4,000+ population) in Mandar CD block are (2011 census figures in brackets): Karge (4,665), Barambe (4,230), Mandar (4,027) and Nagra (5,929).

=== Literacy ===
As of 2011 census, the total number of literate persons in Mandar CD block was 73,709 (67.63% of the population over 6 years) out of which males numbered 42,015 (76.28% of the male population over 6 years) and females numbered 31,694 (58.79% of the female population over 6 years). The gender disparity (the difference between female and male literacy rates) was 17.49%.

As of 2011 census, literacy in Ranchi district was 77.13%. Literacy in Jharkhand was 67.63% in 2011. Literacy in India in 2011 was 74.04%.

Literacy in CD Blocks of
Ranchi district
Ranchi Sadar subdivision
Burmu – 64.54%
Khelari – 74.83%
Kanke – 73.75%
Ormanjhi – 67.53%
Silli – 73.73%
Angara – 64.92%
Namkum – 73.72%
Ratu – 73.00%
Nagri – 71.59%
Mandar – 67.63%
Chanho – 66.81%
Bero – 67.49%
Itki – 73.58%
Lapung – 60.29%
Bundu subdivision
Rahe – 69.19%
Bundu – 66.38%
Sonahatu – 66.04%
Tamar – 62.76%
Source: 2011 Census: CD block Wise
Primary Census Abstract Data

=== Language and religion ===
Religions in Mandar CD block (2011)
Religion	Percent
Others*	45.10%
Islam	24.25%
Hinduism	17.21%
Christianity	13.11%
Other or not stated	0.33%
*mainly tribal religions like Sarna

Hindi is the official language in Jharkhand and Urdu has been declared as an additional official language.

Languages of Mandar block (2011)
1. Kurukh (47.3%)
2. Sadri (29.2%)
3. Hindi (13.0%)
4. Urdu (9.61%)
5. Others (0.83%)

=== Maoist activities and dissent ===
Jharkhand is one of the states affected by Maoist activities. As of 2012, Ranchi district was among the highly affected districts in the state. "Areas of Tamar, Bundu, Sonahatu, Angarha, Sikidari Police Stations and Rahe O.P. have been widely affected by activities of CPI (Maoist) group till the end of year 2009. At the end of year 2010, The activities of CPI (Maoist) group has been minimized up to almost zero level."

According to the Jharkhand Police spokesperson and Inspector General (IG) Saket Singh, as reported on 8 December 2020, "The activities of CPI-Maoist are now confined to small pockets in the state because of our efforts." Civilian fatalities, a key index of security in a region, declined from 20 in 2019, to 8 in 2020, the lowest in this category since 2000, when there were 13 such fatalities. The 28 total fatalities recorded in 2020 are also the lowest overall fatalities recorded in the state in a year since 2000, when they stood at 36.

Ranchi being the capital city of the state has always been under minute scrutiny of all. The arrest, from his home in Ranchi on 9 October 2020, by the NIA, of 83-years old Stan Swamy, Jesuit priest and activist, working with tribals for decades, and his subsequent death in custody, in a Mumbai hospital, on 5 July 2021, has been widely discussed.

== Economy ==
=== Livelihood ===
Livelihood
in Mandar CD block
1. Cultivators (55.6%)
2. Agricultural labourers (28.5%)
3. Household industries (3.64%)
4. Other Workers (12.3%)

In Mandar CD block in 2011, amongst the class of total workers, cultivators numbered 32,858 and formed 55.56%, agricultural labourers numbered 16,860 and formed 28.51%, household industry workers numbered 2,155 and formed 3.64% and other workers numbered 7,267 and formed 12.29%. Total workers numbered 59,140 and formed 45.99% of the total population, and non-workers numbered 69,445 and formed 54.01% of the population.

=== Infrastructure ===
There are 69 inhabited villages in Mandar CD block. In 2011, 16 villages had power supply. 3 villages had tap water (treated/ untreated), 69 villages had well water (covered/ uncovered), 69 villages had hand pumps, and all villages have drinking water facility. 15 villages had post offices, 8 villages had sub post offices, 11 villages had telephones (land lines), 54 villages had mobile phone coverage. 67 villages had pucca (paved) village roads, 17 villages had bus service (public/ private), 48 villages had autos/ modified autos, 12 villages had taxi/vans, 48 villages had tractors. 3 villages had bank branches, 4 villages had agricultural credit societies. 4 villages had public distribution system, 58 villages had assembly polling stations.

=== Rural poverty ===
60-70% of the population of Ranchi district were in the BPL category in 2004–2005. In 2011-12, the proportion of BPL population in Ranchi district came down to 27.82%. According to a study in 2013 (modified in 2019), "the incidence of poverty in Jharkhand is estimated at 46%, but 60% of the scheduled castes and scheduled tribes are still below poverty line."

=== Agriculture ===
In Ranchi district, 23% of the total area is covered with forests. "With the gradual deforestation of the district, more and more land is being brought under cultivation." Terraced low lands are called don and the uplands are called tanr. The hill streams remain almost dry, except in the rainy season, and does not offer much scope for irrigation.

In Mandar CD block, 41.53% of the total area was cultivable, in 2011. Out of this, 9.58% was irrigated land.

=== Backward Regions Grant Fund ===
Ranchi district is listed as a backward region and receives financial support from the Backward Regions Grant Fund. The fund, created by the Government of India, is designed to redress regional imbalances in development. As of 2012, 272 districts across the country were listed under this scheme. The list includes 21 districts of Jharkhand.

== Transport ==
There is a railway station at Tangarbasuli on the Ranchi-Tori line.

National Highway 39 (Ranchi-Daltonganj), an important roadway in Ranchi district, passes through Mandar block.

== Education ==
Mandar CD block had 8 villages with pre-primary schools, 60 villages with primary schools, 29 villages with middle schools, 7 villages with secondary schools, 4 villages with senior secondary schools, 2 villages with vocational training centre/ ITIs, 2 villages with non-formal training centres, 9 villages with no educational facilities.
.*Senior secondary schools are also known as Inter colleges in Jharkhand

== Healthcare ==
Mandar CD block had 5 villages with primary health centres, 21 villages with primary health subcentres, 9 villages with maternity and child welfare centres, 1 village with allopathic hospital, 5 villages with dispensaries, 1 village with veterinary hospital, 1 village with family welfare centre, 6 villages with medicine shops.
.*Private medical practitioners, alternative medicine etc. not included

== See also ==
- Darjijari
- List of Jharkhand districts ranked by literacy rate
