= Burmu block =

Burmu
- Community development block
- Coordinates: 23.5746°N 85.1315°E
- Country: India
- State: Jharkhand
- District: Ranchi

Government
  - Type: Federal democracy

Area
  - Total: 319.67 km^{2} (123.43 sq mi)

Population (2011)
  - Total: 89,889
  - Density: 281.19/km^{2} (728.29/sq mi)

Languages
  - Official: Hindi, Urdu
- Time zone: UTC+5:30 (IST)
- PIN: 835214
- Telephone/STD code: 06530
- Literacy: 64.54%
- Lok Sabha constituency: Ranchi
- Vidhan Sabha constituency: Kanke
- Website: ranchi.nic.in

Burmu block is a community development block in the Ranchi Sadar subdivision of Ranchi district in the Indian state of Jharkhand.

== Maoist activities, dissent ==
Jharkhand is one of the states affected by Maoist activities. As of 2012, Ranchi district was among the highly affected districts in the state. "Areas of Tamar, Bundu, Sonahatu, Angarha, Sikidari Police Stations and Rahe O.P. have been widely affected by activities of CPI (Maoist) group till the end of year 2009. At the end of year 2010, The activities of CPI (Maoist) group has been minimized up to almost zero level."

According to the Jharkhand Police spokesperson and Inspector General (IG) Saket Singh, as reported on 8 December 2020, "The activities of CPI-Maoist are now confined to small pockets in the state because of our efforts." Civilian fatalities, a key index of security in a region, declined from 20 in 2019, to 8 in 2020, the lowest in this category since 2000, when there were 13 such fatalities. The 28 total fatalities recorded in 2020 are also the lowest overall fatalities recorded in the state in a year since 2000, when they stood at 36.

== Geography ==
Burmu is located at 23.5746°N 85.1315°E.

Burmu CD block is located on the Ranchi plateau proper. It has an average elevation of 2,140 feet (650 m) above mean sea level and the land is undulating.

Burmu CD block is bounded by the Barkagaon CD block in Hazaribagh district on the north, Patratu CD block in Ramgarh district and Kanke CD block on the east, Ratu and Mandar CD blocks the south, and Chanho and Khelari CD blocks on the west.

Burmu CD block has an area of 319.67 km^{2}.Burmu police station serves Burmu CD block. The headquarters of Burmu CD block is located at Burmu village.

== Demographics ==
=== Population ===
According to the 2011 Census of India, Burmu CD block had a total population of 89,889, all of which were rural. There were 45,663 (51%) males and 44,226 (49%) females. Population in the age range 0–6 years was 14,044. Scheduled Castes numbered 7,036 (7.83%) and Scheduled Tribes numbered 35,245 (39.21%).

The only large villages (with 4,000+ population) in Burmu CD block is (2011 census figures in brackets): Ginjo Thakurgaon (5,862).

=== Literacy ===
As of 2011 census, the total number of literate persons in Burmu CD block was 48,954 (64.54% of the population over 6 years) out of which males numbered 28,665 (74.41% of the male population over 6 years) and females numbered 20,289 (54.36% of the female population over 6 years). The gender disparity (the difference between female and male literacy rates) was 20.05%.

As of 2011 census, literacy in Ranchi district was 77.13%. Literacy in Jharkhand was 67.63% in 2011. Literacy in India in 2011 was 74.04%.

See also – List of Jharkhand districts ranked by literacy rate

Literacy in CD Blocks of
Ranchi district
Ranchi Sadar subdivision
Burmu – 64.54%
Khelari – 74.83%
Kanke – 73.75%
Ormanjhi – 67.53%
Silli – 73.73%
Angara – 64.92%
Namkum – 73.72%
Ratu – 73.00%
Nagri – 71.59%
Mandar – 67.63%
Chanho – 66.81%
Bero – 67.49%
Itki – 73.58%
Lapung – 60.29%
Bundu subdivision
Rahe – 69.19%
Bundu – 66.38%
Sonahatu – 66.04%
Tamar – 62.76%
Source: 2011 Census: CD block Wise
Primary Census Abstract Data

=== Language and religion ===
Religions in Burmu CD block (2011)
Religion	Percent
Hinduism	61.47%
Others*	24.32%
Islam	12.29%
Christianity	1.18%
Other or not stated	0.74%
*mainly tribal religions like Sarna

In the block 55,259 (61.47%) are Hindus, 21,857 (24.32%) are other religions (mainly Sarna), 11,045 (12.29%) Muslims, and 1,060 (1.18%) Christians

Languages of Burmu block (2011)
1. Sadri (79.4%)
2. Urdu (7.84%)
3. Hindi (5.48%)
4. Kurukh (2.99%)
5. Santali (2.05%)
6. Mundari (1.31%)
7. Others (0.96%)

At the time of the 2011 census, 79.37% of the population spoke Sadri, 7.84% Urdu, 5.48% Hindi, 2.99% Kurukh, 2.05% Santali and 1.31% Mundari as their first language.

Hindi is the official language in Jharkhand and Urdu has been declared as an additional official language.

The percentage of Scheduled Tribes in Ranchi district, in 2011, was 47.67% of the population (rural) in the blocks. The percentage of Scheduled Tribes, numbering 1,042,016, in the total population of Ranchi district numbering 2,914,253 in 2011, was 35.76%. The Oraons forming 18.20% of the population and the Mundas forming 10.30% of the population, were the main tribes. Other tribes included (percentage of population in brackets) Lohra (2.46), Bedia (1.32) and Mahli (1.09).

== Rural poverty ==
60-70% of the population of Ranchi district were in the BPL category in 2004–2005. In 2011-12, the proportion of BPL population in Ranchi district came down to 27.82%. According to a study in 2013 (modified in 2019), "the incidence of poverty in Jharkhand is estimated at 46%, but 60% of the scheduled castes and scheduled tribes are still below poverty line."

== Economy ==
=== Livelihood ===
Livelihood
in Burmu CD block
1. Cultivators (52.1%)
2. Agricultural labourers (33.8%)
3. Household industries (2.07%)
4. Other Workers (12.0%)

In Burmu CD block in 2011, amongst the class of total workers, cultivators numbered 21,241 and formed 52.12%, agricultural labourers numbered 13,776 and formed 33.80%, household industry workers numbered 845 and formed 2.07% and other workers numbered 4,893 and formed 12.01%. Total workers numbered 40,755 and formed 45.34% of the total population, and non-workers numbered 49,134 and formed 54.66% of the population.

=== Infrastructure ===
There are 77 inhabited villages in Burmu CD block. In 2011, 43 villages had power supply. 3 villages had tap water (treated/ untreated), 77 villages had well water (covered/ uncovered), 76 villages had hand pumps, and all villages have drinking water facility. 18 villages had post offices, 9 villages had sub post offices, 3 villages had telephones (land lines), 34 villages had mobile phone coverage. 58 villages had pucca (paved) village roads, 18 villages had bus service (public/ private), 15 villages had autos/ modified autos, 2 villages had taxi/vans, 21 villages had tractors. 3 villages had bank branches, 13 villages had agricultural credit societies, 2 villages had public library and public reading rooms. 8 villages had public distribution system, 62 villages had assembly polling stations.

=== Agriculture ===
In Ranchi district, 23% of the total area is covered with forests. "With the gradual deforestation of the district, more and more land is being brought under cultivation." Terraced low lands are called doin and the uplands are called tanr. The hill streams remain almost dry, except in the rainy season, and does not offer much scope for irrigation.

In Burmu CD block, 35.76% of the total area was cultivable, in 2011. Out of this, 9.32% was irrigated land.

=== Backward Regions Grant Fund ===
Ranchi district is listed as a backward region and receives financial support from the Backward Regions Grant Fund. The fund, created by the Government of India, is designed to redress regional imbalances in development. As of 2012, 272 districts across the country were listed under this scheme. The list includes 21 districts of Jharkhand.

== Education ==
Burmu CD block had 9 villages with pre-primary schools, 71 villages with primary schools, 38 villages with middle schools, 7 villages with secondary schools, 1 village with senior secondary school, 1 village with non-formal training centre, 5 villages with no educational facility.
.*Senior secondary schools are also known as Inter colleges in Jharkhand

== Healthcare ==
Burmu CD block had 7 villages with primary health centres, 18 villages with primary health subcentres, 9 villages with maternity and child welfare centres, 8 villages with allopathic hospitals, 3 villages with dispensaries, 1 village with veterinary hospital, 2 villages with family welfare centres, 3 villages with medicine shops.
.*Private medical practitioners, alternative medicine etc. not included
