= Bero block =

Bero
- Community development block
- Coordinates: 23.29°N 85.02°E
- Country: India
- State: Jharkhand
- District: Ranchi

Government
  - Type: Federal democracy

Area
  - Total: 290.70 km^{2} (112.24 sq mi)

Population (2011)
  - Total: 113,090
  - Density: 389.03/km^{2} (1,007.6/sq mi)

Languages
  - Official: Hindi, Nagpuri
- Time zone: UTC+5:30 (IST)
- PIN: 835202
- Telephone/STD code: 06530
- Literacy: 67.49%
- Lok Sabha constituency: Lohardaga
- Vidhan Sabha constituency: Mandar
- Website: ranchi.nic.in

Bero block is an administrative division in the Ranchi Sadar subdivision of Ranchi district, Jharkhand state, India.

== Geography ==
Bero is located at 23.29°N 85.02°E.

Bero CD block is located on the Ranchi plateau proper. It has an average elevation of 2,140 feet (650 m) above mean sea level and the land is undulating.

Bero CD block is bounded by the Chanho and Mandar CD blocks on the north, Itki CD block on the east, Lapung CD block on the south, and Bharno block in Gumla district and Bhandra and Kairo CD blocks in Lohardaga district on the west.

Bero CD block has an area of 290.70 km^{2}.Bero and Narkopi police stations serve Bero CD block. The headquarters of Bero CD block is located at Bero village.

== Demographics ==
=== Population ===
According to the 2011 Census of India, Bero CD block had a total population of 113,090, all of which were rural. There were 57,311 (51%) males and 55,779 (49%) females. Population in the age range 0–6 years was 17,518. Scheduled Castes numbered 2,226 (1.97%) and Scheduled Tribes numbered 69,995 (61.86%).

The percentage of Scheduled Tribes in Ranchi district, in 2011, was 47.67% of the population (rural) in the blocks. The percentage of Scheduled Tribes, numbering 1,042,016, in the total population of Ranchi district numbering 2,914,253 in 2011, was 35.76%. The Oraons forming 18.20% of the population and the Mundas forming 10.30% of the population, were the main tribes. Other tribes included (percentage of population in brackets) Lohra (2.46), Bedia (1.32) and Mahli (1.09).

Large villages (with 4,000+ population) Bero CD block are (2011 census figures in brackets): Khukhra (5,527), Puriya (4,413) and Bero (7,193).

=== Literacy ===
As of 2011 census, the total number of literate persons in Bero CD block was 64,504 (67.49% of the population over 6 years) out of which males numbered 37,437 (77.45% of the male population over 6 years) and females numbered 27,067 (57.30% of the female population over 6 years). The gender disparity (the difference between female and male literacy rates) was 20.15%.

As of 2011 census, literacy in Ranchi district was 77.13%. Literacy in Jharkhand was 67.63% in 2011. Literacy in India in 2011 was 74.04%.

See also – List of Jharkhand districts ranked by literacy rate

Literacy in CD Blocks of
Ranchi district
Ranchi Sadar subdivision
Burmu – 64.54%
Khelari – 74.83%
Kanke – 73.75%
Ormanjhi – 67.53%
Silli – 73.73%
Angara – 64.92%
Namkum – 73.72%
Ratu – 73.00%
Nagri – 71.59%
Mandar – 67.63%
Chanho – 66.81%
Bero – 67.49%
Itki – 73.58%
Lapung – 60.29%
Bundu subdivision
Rahe – 69.19%
Bundu – 66.38%
Sonahatu – 66.04%
Tamar – 62.76%
Source: 2011 Census: CD block Wise
Primary Census Abstract Data

=== Language and religion ===
Religions in Bero CD block (2011)
Religion	Percent
Others*	48.28%
Hinduism	28.06%
Islam	15.10%
Christianity	7.89%
Other or not stated	0.67%
*mainly tribal religions like Sarna

Hindi is the official language in Jharkhand and Urdu has been declared as an additional official language.

Languages of Bero CD block (2011)
1. Sadri (48.9%)
2. Kurukh (33.7%)
3. Hindi (8.35%)
4. Urdu (8.27%)
5. Others (0.77%)

== Rural poverty ==
60-70% of the population of Ranchi district were in the BPL category in 2004–2005. In 2011-12, the proportion of BPL population in Ranchi district came down to 27.82%. According to a study in 2013 (modified in 2019), "the incidence of poverty in Jharkhand is estimated at 46%, but 60% of the scheduled castes and scheduled tribes are still below poverty line."

== Economy ==
=== Livelihood ===
Livelihood
in Bero CD block
1. Cultivators (51.0%)
2. Agricultural labourers (34.3%)
3. Household industries (4.21%)
4. Other Workers (10.5%)

In Bero CD block in 2011, amongst the class of total workers, cultivators numbered 28,785 and formed 51.01%, agricultural labourers numbered 19,337 and formed 34.26%, household industry workers numbered 2,377 and formed 4.21% and other workers numbered 5,935 and formed 10.52%. Total workers numbered 56,434 and formed 49.90% of the total population, and non-workers numbered 56,656 and formed 50.10% of the population.

=== Infrastructure ===
There are 84 inhabited villages in Bero CD block. In 2011, 18 villages had power supply. 3 villages had tap water (treated/ untreated), 84 villages had well water (covered/ uncovered), 83 villages had hand pumps, and all villages have drinking water facility. 7 villages had post offices, 9 villages had sub post offices, 9 villages had telephones (land lines), 56 villages had mobile phone coverage. 72 villages had pucca (paved) village roads, 12 villages had bus service (public/ private), 23 villages had autos/ modified autos, 12 villages had taxi/vans, 28 villages had tractors. 5 villages had bank branches, 4 villages had agricultural credit societies, 31 villages had public distribution system, 77 villages had assembly polling stations.

=== Agriculture ===
In Ranchi district, 23% of the total area is covered with forests. "With the gradual deforestation of the district, more and more land is being brought under cultivation." Terraced low lands are called don and the uplands are called tanr. The hill streams remain almost dry, except in the rainy season, and does not offer much scope for irrigation.

In Bero CD block, 59.28% of the total area was cultivable, in 2011. Out of this, 12.69% was irrigated land.

=== Backward Regions Grant Fund ===
Ranchi district is listed as a backward region and receives financial support from the Backward Regions Grant Fund. The fund, created by the Government of India, is designed to redress regional imbalances in development. As of 2012, 272 districts across the country were listed under this scheme. The list includes 21 districts of Jharkhand.

== Transport ==
There is a railway station at Narkopi on the Ranchi-Tori line.

National Highway 43 (earlier NH 23) (Ranchi-Gumla-Simdega-Rourkela), an important roadway in Ranchi district, passes through Bero block.

== Education ==
Bero CD block had 12 villages with pre-primary schools, 75 villages with primary schools, 33 villages with middle schools, 5 villages with secondary schools, 1 village with senior secondary school, 1 village with general degree college, 8 villages with no educational facility.
.*Senior secondary schools are also known as Inter colleges in Jharkhand

== Healthcare ==
Bero CD block had 3 villages with primary health centres, 7 villages with primary health subcentres, 1 village with maternity and child welfare centre, 1 village with allopathic hospital, 1 village with dispensary, 1 village with veterinary hospital, 2 villages with family welfare centres, 6 villages with medicine shops.
.*Private medical practitioners, alternative medicine etc. not included
