= Bundu, India =

Bundu
- Town
- Location in Jharkhand, India Bundu (India)
- Coordinates: 23.18°N 85.58°E
- Country: India
- State: Jharkhand
- District: Ranchi
- Block: Bundu

Government
  - Type: Municipal corporation
  - Body: Bundu Nagar Panchayat

Area
  - Total: 18 km^{2} (6.9 sq mi)
- Elevation: 337 m (1,106 ft)

Population (2011)
  - Total: 21,054
  - Density: 1,200/km^{2} (3,000/sq mi)
- Time zone: UTC+5:30 (IST)
- PIN: 835204
- Vehicle registration: JH

Bundu is a subdivisional town, a notified area, in the Bundu subdivision of Ranchi district in the state of Jharkhand, India. Situated about 40 km from the city of Ranchi and 83 km from the industrial city of Jamshedpur.

== Geography ==
Cities, towns and locations in Ranchi district in South Chotanagpur Division
M: municipality, CT: census town, R: rural/ urban centre, N: neighbourhood, T: tourist centre, D: dam, H: historical/ religious centre
Owing to space constraints in the small map, the actual locations in a larger map may vary slightly

=== Location ===
Bundu is located at 23.18°N 85.58°E. It has an average elevation of 337 metres (1105 feet). It is located on National Highway-33 between Ranchi and Jamshedpur and blessed with all the natural beauties. It is surrounded by mountains and forest. Surya Mandir and Dassam Falls are main attraction and tourist spots.'Statue of Ulgulan'(Statue of Birsa Munda) is under construction near Surya Mandir which will be of about 150 ft tall will also be a tourist attraction in the town.

=== Area overview ===
The map alongside shows a part of the Ranchi plateau, most of it at an average elevation of 2,140 feet above sea level. Only a small part in the north-eastern part of the district is the lower Ranchi plateau, spread over Silli, Rahe, Sonahatu and Tamar CD blocks, at an elevation of 500 to 1,000 feet above sea level. There is a 16 km long ridge south-west of Ranchi. There are isolated hills in the central plateau. The principal river of the district, the Subarnarekha, originates near Ratu, flows in an easterly direction and descends from the plateau, with a drop of about 300 feet at Hundru Falls. Subarnarekha and other important rivers are marked on the map. The forested area is shaded in the map. A major part of the North Karanpura Area and some fringe areas of the Piparwar Area of the Central Coalfields Limited, both located in the North Karanpura Coalfield, are in Ranchi district. There has been extensive industrial activity in Ranchi district, since independence. Ranchi district is the first in the state in terms of population. 8.83% of the total population of the state lives in this district - 56.9% is rural population and 43.1% is urban population.

Note: The map alongside presents some of the notable locations in the district. All places marked in the map are linked in the larger full screen map.

== Demographics ==
According to the 2011 Census of India, Bundu had a total population of 21,054, of which 10,740 (51%) were males and 10,314 (49%) were females. Population in the age range 0–6 years was 2,753. The total number of literate persons in Bundu was 13,764 (75.21% of the population over 6 years).

As of 2001 India census, Bundu had a population of 18,505. Males constitute 53% of the population and females 47%. Bundu has an average literacy rate of 61%, higher than the national average of 59.5%; with male literacy of 72% and female literacy of 49%. 14% of the population is under 6 years of age

== Infrastructure ==
According to the District Census Handbook 2011, Ranchi, Bundu covered an area of 18 km^{2}. Among the civic amenities, it had 30 km roads with both closed and open drains, the protected water supply involved uncovered well, hand pump. It had 2,588 domestic electric connections, 245 road lighting points. Among the medical facilities, it had 1 hospital, 1 dispensary, 1 health centre, 1 family welfare centre, 1 maternity and child welfare centre, 1 maternity home, 3 nursing homes, 8 medicine shops. Among the educational facilities it had 15 primary schools, 7 middle schools, 5 secondary schools, 1 senior secondary school, 1 general degree college. It had 1 non-formal education centre (Sarva Shiksha Abhiyan). Among the social, recreational and cultural facilities it had 2 cinema theatres, 1 auditorium/ community hall, 1 public library, 1 reading room. Three important commodities it produced were lac, paddy, vegetables. It had the branch offices of 2 nationalised banks, 1 cooperative bank, 1 agricultural credit society, 1 non-agricultural credit society.

== Transport ==
National Highway 43 (earlier NH 33) (Ranchi-Bundu-Tamar-Chandil-Jamshedpur), an important roadway in Ranchi district, passes through Bundu.
