= Ratu block =

Ratu
- Community development block
- Coordinates: 23.41°N 85.2°E
- Country: India
- State: Jharkhand
- District: Ranchi

Government
  - Type: Federal democracy

Area
  - Total: 104.47 km^{2} (40.34 sq mi)

Population (2011)
  - Total: 76,565
  - Density: 732.89/km^{2} (1,898.2/sq mi)
- Time zone: UTC+5:30 (IST)
- Literacy: 73.00%
- Lok Sabha constituency: Ranchi
- Website: ranchi.nic.in

Ratu is a community development block in the Ranchi Sadar subdivision of Ranchi district, in the Indian state of Jharkhand. Ratu fort, located in Ratu, is a fort of Nagvanshi royal family.

== Geography ==
Ratu is located at 23.41°N 85.2°E.

Ratu CD block is located on the Ranchi plateau proper. It has an average elevation of 2,140 feet (650 m) above mean sea level and the land is undulating.

Ratu CD block is bounded by the Burmu CD block on the north, Kanke CD block on the west, Nagri and Itki CD blocks on the south and Mandar CD block on the west.

Ratu CD block has an area of 104.47 km^{2}.Ratu police station serves Ratu CD block. The headquarters of Ratu CD block is located at Ratu town.

== Demographics ==
=== Population ===
According to the 2011 Census of India, Ratu CD block had a total population of 76,565, of which 54,186 were rural and 22,379 were urban. There were 38,785 (51%) males and 37,780 (49%) females. Population in the age range 0–6 years was 10,935. Scheduled Castes numbered 2,609 (3.41%) and Scheduled Tribes numbered 34,676 (45.29%). The tribe of this block is the Kurukh.

The only census town in Ratu CD block is (2011 population figure in brackets): Ratu (22,379).

Large villages (with 4,000+ population) in Ratu CD block are (2011 census figures in brackets): Tigra (4,713), Nagri (6,118) and Gutuwa (4,835).

=== Literacy ===
As of 2011 census, the total number of literate persons in Ratu CD block was 47,911 (73.00% of the population over 6 years) out of which males numbered 27,129 (81.72% of the male population over 6 years) and females numbered 20,782 (64.08% of the female population over 6 years). The gender disparity (the difference between female and male literacy rates) was 17.64%.

As of 2011 census, literacy in Ranchi district was 77.13%. Literacy in Jharkhand was 67.63% in 2011. Literacy in India in 2011 was 74.04%.

See also – List of Jharkhand districts ranked by literacy rate

Literacy in CD Blocks of
Ranchi district
Ranchi Sadar subdivision
Burmu – 64.54%
Khelari – 74.83%
Kanke – 73.75%
Ormanjhi – 67.53%
Silli – 73.73%
Angara – 64.92%
Namkum – 73.72%
Ratu – 73.00%
Nagri – 71.59%
Mandar – 67.63%
Chanho – 66.81%
Bero – 67.49%
Itki – 73.58%
Lapung – 60.29%
Bundu subdivision
Rahe – 69.19%
Bundu – 66.38%
Sonahatu – 66.04%
Tamar – 62.76%
Source: 2011 Census: CD block Wise
Primary Census Abstract Data

=== Language and religion ===
Religions in Ratu CD block (2011)
Religion	Percent
Hinduism	42.28%
Others*	37.18%
Islam	17.02%
Christianity	3.36%
Other or not stated	0.16%
*mainly tribal religions like Sarna

Hinduism is the largest religion with 42.28% of the population, while Sarna followers are 37.18% of the population. Muslims are 17.02% and Christians are 3.36% of the population.

Languages of Ratu CD block (2011)
1. Sadri (59.3%)
2. Kurukh (17.3%)
3. Hindi (14.4%)
4. Urdu (5.85%)
5. Bhojpuri (1.12%)
6. Others (2.04%)

== Rural poverty ==
60-70% of the population of Ranchi district were in the BPL category in 2004–2005. In 2011-12, the proportion of BPL population in Ranchi district came down to 27.82%. According to a study in 2013 (modified in 2019), "the incidence of poverty in Jharkhand is estimated at 46%, but 60% of the scheduled castes and scheduled tribes are still below poverty line."

== Economy ==
=== Livelihood ===
Livelihood
in Ratu CD block
1. Cultivators (42.0%)
2. Agricultural labourers (17.1%)
3. Household industries (2.15%)
4. Other Workers (38.8%)

In Ratu CD block in 2011, amongst the class of total workers, cultivators numbered 12,175 and formed 42.05%, agricultural labourers numbered 4,947 and formed 17.09%, household industry workers numbered 621 and formed 2.15% and other workers numbered 11,208 and formed 38.79%. Total workers numbered 28,951 and formed 37.81% of the total population, and non-workers numbered 47,614 and formed 62.19% of the population.

=== Infrastructure ===
There are 37 inhabited villages in Ratu CD block. In 2011, 15 villages had power supply. 15 villages had tap water (treated/ untreated), 37 villages had well water (covered/ uncovered), 36 villages had hand pumps, and all villages have drinking water facility. 4 villages had post offices, 6 villages had sub post offices, 5 villages had telephones (land lines), 17 villages had mobile phone coverage. 29 villages had pucca (paved) village roads, 12 villages had bus service (public/ private), 15 villages had autos/ modified autos, 3 villages had taxi/vans, 16 villages had tractors. 2 villages had bank branches, 1 village had agricultural credit society, 1 village had public distribution system, 26 villages had assembly polling stations.

=== Agriculture ===
In Ranchi district, 23% of the total area is covered with forests. "With the gradual deforestation of the district, more and more land is being brought under cultivation." Terraced low lands are called don and the uplands are called tanr. The hill streams remain almost dry, except in the rainy season, and does not offer much scope for irrigation.

In Ratu CD block, 97.62% of the total area was cultivable, in 2011. Out of this, 34.19% was irrigated land.

=== Backward Regions Grant Fund ===
Ranchi district is listed as a backward region and receives financial support from the Backward Regions Grant Fund. The fund, created by the Government of India, is designed to redress regional imbalances in development. As of 2012, 272 districts across the country were listed under this scheme. The list includes 21 districts of Jharkhand.

== Transport ==
National Highway 39 (Ranchi-Daltonganj), an important roadway in Ranchi district, passes through Ratu block.

== Education ==
Ratu CD block had 2 villages with pre-primary schools, 33 villages with primary schools, 17 villages with middle schools, 4 villages with secondary schools, 2 villages with special schools for disabled, 4 villages with no educational facilities.
.*Senior secondary schools are also known as Inter colleges in Jharkhand

== Healthcare ==
Ratu CD block had 2 villages with primary health centres, 14 villages with primary health subcentres, 5 villages with maternity and child welfare centres, 1 village with allopathic hospital, 2 villages with veterinary hospitals, 2 villages with family welfare centres, 31 villages with medicine shops.
.*Private medical practitioners, alternative medicine etc. not included
