= Bundu block =

Bundu
- Community development block
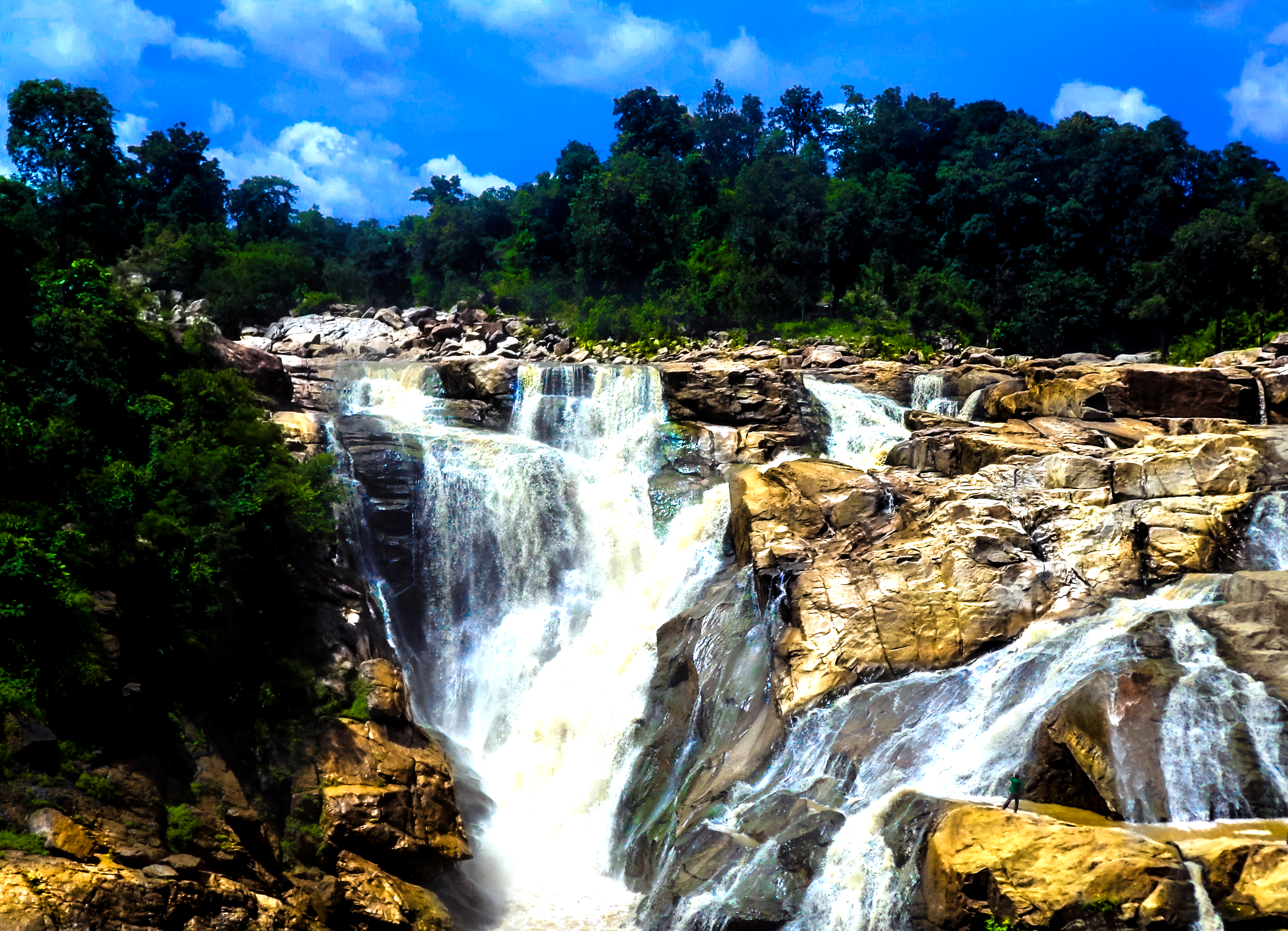
- Dassam Falls

- Coordinates: 23.18°N 85.58°E
- Country: India
- State: Jharkhand
- District: Ranchi

Government
  - Type: Federal democracy

Area
  - Total: 250.85 km^{2} (96.85 sq mi)

Population (2011)
  - Total: 61,921
  - Density: 246.84/km^{2} (639.32/sq mi)

Languages
  - Official: Hindi, Urdu
- Time zone: UTC+5:30 (IST)
- PIN: 835204
- Telephone/STD code: 06530
- Literacy: 66.38%
- Lok Sabha constituency: Khunti
- Vidhan Sabha constituency: Tamar
- Website: ranchi.nic.in

Bundu is a CD block that forms an administrative subdivision in Bundu subdivision of Ranchi district, Jharkhand, India.

Localities of Bundu Include Purana Bazar Toli, Mahavir Mandir Gali, Adarsh Nagar, Sahitya Marg, Munda Colony etc.

== Maoist activities, dissent ==
Jharkhand is one of the states affected by Maoist activities. As of 2012, Ranchi district was among the highly affected districts in the state. "Areas of Tamar, Bundu, Sonahatu, Angarha, Sikidari Police Stations and Rahe O.P. have been widely affected by activities of CPI (Maoist) group till the end of year 2009. At the end of year 2010, The activities of CPI (Maoist) group has been minimized up to almost zero level."

According to the Jharkhand Police spokesperson and Inspector General (IG) Saket Singh, as reported on 8 December 2020, "The activities of CPI-Maoist are now confined to small pockets in the state because of our efforts." Civilian fatalities, a key index of security in a region, declined from 20 in 2019, to 8 in 2020, the lowest in this category since 2000, when there were 13 such fatalities. The 28 total fatalities recorded in 2020 are also the lowest overall fatalities recorded in the state in a year since 2000, when they stood at 36.

Ranchi being the capital city of the state has always been under minute scrutiny of all. The arrest, from his home in Ranchi on 9 October 2020, by the NIA, of 83-years old Stan Swamy, Jesuit priest and activist, working with tribals for decades, and his subsequent death in custody, in a Mumbai hospital, on 5 July 2021, has been widely discussed.

== Geography ==
Bundu is located at 23.18°N 85.58°E.

Bundu CD block is located on the Ranchi plateau proper. It has an average elevation of 2,140 feet (650 m) above mean sea level and the land is undulating.

The Dassam Falls is a natural cascade across the Kanchi River, a tributary of the Subarnarekha River. The water falls from a height of 44 metres (144 ft). The sound of water echoes all around the place. Dassam Falls at one of the edges of the Ranchi plateau is one of the many scarp falls in the region.

Bundu CD block is bounded by the Namkum and Rahe CD blocks on the north, Sonahatu and Tamar I CD blocks on the east, Arki (Tamar II) CD block in Khunti district on the south and Khunti CD block in Khunti district on the west.

Bundu CD block has an area of 250.85 km^{2}.Bundu police station serves Bundu CD block. The headquarters of Bundu CD block is located at Bundu town.

== Demographics ==
=== Population ===
According to the 2011 Census of India, Bundu CD block had a total population of 61,921, all of which were rural. There were 31,533 (51%) males and 30,388 (49%) females. Population in the age range 0–6 years was 8,804. Scheduled Castes numbered 3,378 (5.46%) and Scheduled Tribes numbered 37,042 (59.82%).

The percentage of Scheduled Tribes in Ranchi district, in 2011, was 47.67% of the population (rural) in the blocks. The percentage of Scheduled Tribes, numbering 1,042,016, in the total population of Ranchi district numbering 2,914,253 in 2011, was 35.76%. The Oraons forming 18.20% of the population and the Mundas forming 10.30% of the population, were the main tribes. Other tribes included (percentage of population in brackets) Lohra (2.46), Bedia (1.32) and Mahli (1.09).

=== Literacy ===
As of 2011 census, the total number of literate persons in Bundu CD block was 35,261 (66.38% of the population over 6 years) out of which males numbered 21,664 (80.40% of the male population over 6 years) and females numbered 13,597 (51.95% of the female population over 6 years). The gender disparity (the difference between female and male literacy rates) was 28.45%.

As of 2011 census, literacy in Ranchi district was 77.13%. Literacy in Jharkhand was 67.63% in 2011. Literacy in India in 2011 was 74.04%.

See also – List of Jharkhand districts ranked by literacy rate

Literacy in CD Blocks of
Ranchi district
Ranchi Sadar subdivision
Burmu – 64.54%
Khelari – 74.83%
Kanke – 73.75%
Ormanjhi – 67.53%
Silli – 73.73%
Angara – 64.92%
Namkum – 73.72%
Ratu – 73.00%
Nagri – 71.59%
Mandar – 67.63%
Chanho – 66.81%
Bero – 67.49%
Itki – 73.58%
Lapung – 60.29%
Bundu subdivision
Rahe – 69.19%
Bundu – 66.38%
Sonahatu – 66.04%
Tamar – 62.76%
Source: 2011 Census: CD block Wise
Primary Census Abstract Data

=== Language and religion ===
Religions in Bundu CD block (2011)
Religion	Percent
Hinduism	61.72%
Others*	34.03%
Islam	1.88%
Christianity	1.62%
Other or not stated	0.75%
*mainly tribal religions like Sarna

Hindi is the official language in Jharkhand and Urdu has been declared as an additional official language.

Languages in Bundu CD block (2011)
1. Panchpargania (55.1%)
2. Mundari (27.0%)
3. Hindi (7.44%)
4. Bengali (6.76%)
5. Sadri (2.41%)
6. Others (1.26%)

== Rural poverty ==
60-70% of the population of Ranchi district were in the BPL category in 2004–2005. In 2011-12, the proportion of BPL population in Ranchi district came down to 27.82%. According to a study in 2013 (modified in 2019), "the incidence of poverty in Jharkhand is estimated at 46%, but 60% of the scheduled castes and scheduled tribes are still below poverty line."

== Economy ==
=== Livelihood ===
Livelihood
in Bundu CD block
1. Cultivators (29.5%)
2. Agricultural labourers (44.2%)
3. Household industries (4.77%)
4. Other Workers (21.5%)

In Bundu CD block in 2011, amongst the class of total workers, cultivators numbered 10,966 and formed 29.49%, agricultural labourers numbered 16,437 and formed 44.21%, household industry workers numbered 1,772 and formed 4.77% and other workers numbered 8,007 and formed 21.53%. Total workers numbered 37,182 and formed 44.81% of the total population, and non-workers numbered 45,793 and formed 55.19% of the population.

=== Infrastructure ===
There are 87 inhabited villages in Bundu CD block. In 2011, 6 villages had power supply. 8 villages had tap water (treated/ untreated), 87 villages had well water (covered/ uncovered), 85 villages had hand pumps, and all villages have drinking water facility. 4 villages had post offices, 4 villages had sub post offices, 1 village had telephones (land lines), 15 villages had mobile phone coverage. 70 villages had pucca (paved) village roads, 4 villages had bus service (public/ private), 20 villages had tractors. 3 villages had bank branches, 1 village had agricultural credit society, 71 villages had assembly polling stations.

=== Agriculture ===
In Ranchi district, 23% of the total area is covered with forests. "With the gradual deforestation of the district, more and more land is being brought under cultivation." Terraced low lands are called don and the uplands are called tanr. The hill streams remain almost dry, except in the rainy season, and does not offer much scope for irrigation.

In Bundu CD block, 45.37% of the total area was cultivable, in 2011. Out of this, 4.80% was irrigated land.

=== Backward Regions Grant Fund ===
Ranchi district is listed as a backward region and receives financial support from the Backward Regions Grant Fund. The fund, created by the Government of India, is designed to redress regional imbalances in development. As of 2012, 272 districts across the country were listed under this scheme. The list includes 21 districts of Jharkhand.

== Transport ==
National Highway 43 (earlier NH 33) (Ranchi-Bundu-Tamar-Chandil-Jamshedpur), an important roadway in Ranchi district, passes through Bundu block.

== Education ==
Bundu CD block had 2 villages with pre-primary schools, 76 villages with primary schools, 35 villages with middle schools, 3 villages with secondary schools, 1 village with senior secondary school, 8 villages with non-formal education centres. 9 villages with no educational facility.
.*Senior secondary schools are also known as Inter colleges in Jharkhand

== Healthcare ==
Bundu CD block had 13 villages with primary health subcentres, 1 village with dispensary, 14 villages with medicine shops .
.*Private medical practitioners, alternative medicine etc. not included
