= Darjijari =

Coordinates: 23°24′N 85°02′E

Darjijari is a small village in the Mandar Tehsil of Ranchi district in Jharkhand State, India. Its main village panchayat is Darjijari Panchayat. In 2011 it had a population of 1294.
