= Chanho block =

Chanho
- Community development block
- Coordinates: 23.51°N 84.95°E
- Country: India
- State: Jharkhand
- District: Ranchi

Government
  - Type: Federal democracy

Area
  - Total: 272.80 km^{2} (105.33 sq mi)

Population (2011)
  - Total: 107,503
  - Density: 394.07/km^{2} (1,020.6/sq mi)
- Time zone: UTC+5:30 (IST)
- PIN: 835239
- Telephone/ STD code: 06351
- Literacy: 73.00%
- Lok Sabha constituency: Lohardaga
- Vidhan Sabha constituency: Mandar
- Website: ranchi.nic.in

Chanho block is a community development block in the Ranchi Sadar subdivision of Ranchi district in the Indian state of Jharkhand.

== Geography ==
Chanho is located at 23.51°N 84.95°E'

Chanho CD block is located on the Ranchi plateau proper. It has an average elevation of 2,140 feet (650 m) above mean sea level and the land is undulating.

Chanho CD block is bounded by the Khelari CD block on the north, Burmu CD block on the east, Mandar and Bero CD blocks on the south and Kuru and Kairo CD blocks in Lohardaga district and Chandwa CD block in Latehar district on the west.

Chanho CD block has an area of 272.80 km^{2}.Chanho police station serves Chano CD block. The headquarters of Chano CD block is located at Chanho village.

== Demographics ==
=== Population ===
According to the 2011 Census of India, Chanho CD block had a total population of 107,503, all of which were rural. There were 54,283 (50%) males and 53,220 (50%) females. Population in the age range 0–6 years was 17,712. Scheduled Castes numbered 2,171 (2.02%) and Scheduled Tribes numbered 57,608 (53.59%).

The percentage of Scheduled Tribes in Ranchi district, in 2011, was 47.67% of the population (rural) in the blocks. The percentage of Scheduled Tribes, numbering 1,042,016, in the total population of Ranchi district numbering 2,914,253 in 2011, was 35.76%. The Oraons forming 18.20% of the population and the Mundas forming 10.30% of the population, were the main tribes. Other tribes included (percentage of population in brackets) Lohra (2.46), Bedia (1.32) and Mahli (1.09).

Large villages (with 4,000+ population) in Chanho CD block are (2011 census figures in brackets): Balsokra (5,518), Patratu (5,941) and Choreya (4,994).

=== Literacy ===
As of 2011 census, the total number of literate persons in Chanho CD block was 47,911 (73.00% of the population over 6 years) out of which males numbered 27,129 (81.72% of the male population over 6 years) and females numbered 20,782 (64.08% of the female population over 6 years). The gender disparity (the difference between female and male literacy rates) was 17.64%.

As of 2011 census, literacy in Ranchi district was 77.13%. Literacy in Jharkhand was 67.63% in 2011. Literacy in India in 2011 was 74.04%.

See also – List of Jharkhand districts ranked by literacy rate

Literacy in CD Blocks of
Ranchi district
Ranchi Sadar subdivision
Burmu – 64.54%
Khelari – 74.83%
Kanke – 73.75%
Ormanjhi – 67.53%
Silli – 73.73%
Angara – 64.92%
Namkum – 73.72%
Ratu – 73.00%
Nagri – 71.59%
Mandar – 67.63%
Chanho – 66.81%
Bero – 67.49%
Itki – 73.58%
Lapung – 60.29%
Bundu subdivision
Rahe – 69.19%
Bundu – 66.38%
Sonahatu – 66.04%
Tamar – 62.76%
Source: 2011 Census: CD block Wise
Primary Census Abstract Data

=== Language and religion ===
Religions in Chanho CD block (2011)
Religion	Percent
Others*	48.15%
Islam	25.01%
Hinduism	22.48%
Christianity	4.01%
Other or not stated	0.35%
*mainly tribal religions like Sarna

Hindi is the official language in Jharkhand and Urdu has been declared as an additional official language.

Languages of Chanho CD block (2011)
1. Sadri (38.1%)
2. Kurukh (37.1%)
3. Urdu (16.2%)
4. Hindi (7.39%)
5. Others (1.30%)

== Rural poverty ==
60-70% of the population of Ranchi district were in the BPL category in 2004–2005. In 2011-12, the proportion of BPL population in Ranchi district came down to 27.82%. According to a study in 2013 (modified in 2019), "the incidence of poverty in Jharkhand is estimated at 46%, but 60% of the scheduled castes and scheduled tribes are still below poverty line."

== Economy ==
=== Livelihood ===
Livelihood
in Chanho CD block
1. Cultivators (58.1%)
2. Agricultural labourers (29.9%)
3. Household industries (1.75%)
4. Other Workers (10.2%)

In Chanho CD block in 2011, amongst the class of total workers, cultivators numbered 27,385 and formed 58.10%, agricultural labourers numbered 14,097 and formed 29.91%, household industry workers numbered 827 and formed 1.75% and other workers numbered 4,829 and formed 10.24%. Total workers numbered 47,138 and formed 43.85% of the total population, and non-workers numbered 60,365 and formed 56.15% of the population.

=== Infrastructure ===
There are 67 inhabited villages in Chanho CD block. In 2011, 15 villages had power supply. 1 village had tap water (treated/ untreated), 67 villages had well water (covered/ uncovered), 67 villages had hand pumps, and all villages have drinking water facility. 8 villages had post offices, 7 villages had sub post offices, 3 villages had telephones (land lines), 47 villages had mobile phone coverage. 59 villages had pucca (paved) village roads, 17 villages had bus service (public/ private), 14 villages had autos/ modified autos, 4 villages had taxi/vans, 2 villages had tractors. 3 villages had bank branches, 6 villages had agricultural credit societies, 7 villages had public distribution system, 58 villages had assembly polling stations.

=== Agriculture ===
In Ranchi district, 23% of the total area is covered with forests. "With the gradual deforestation of the district, more and more land is being brought under cultivation." Terraced low lands are called don and the uplands are called tanr. The hill streams remain almost dry, except in the rainy season, and does not offer much scope for irrigation.

In Chanho CD block, 35.44% of the total area was cultivable, in 2011. Out of this, 10.51% was irrigated land.

=== Backward Regions Grant Fund ===
Ranchi district is listed as a backward region and receives financial support from the Backward Regions Grant Fund. The fund, created by the Government of India, is designed to redress regional imbalances in development. As of 2012, 272 districts across the country were listed under this scheme. The list includes 21 districts of Jharkhand.

== Transport ==
National Highway 39 (Ranchi-Daltonganj), an important roadway in Ranchi district, passes through Chanho block.

== Education ==
Chanho CD block had 3 villages with pre-primary schools, 65 villages with primary schools, 33 villages with middle schools, 9 villages with secondary schools, 3 villages with senior secondary schools, 2 villages with no educational facilities.
.*Senior secondary schools are also known as Inter colleges in Jharkhand

== Healthcare ==
Chanho CD block had 4 villages with primary health centres, 20 villages with primary health subcentres, 3 villages with maternity and child welfare centres, 5 villages with allopathic hospitals, 8 villages with dispensaries, 5 villages with family welfare centres, 6 villages with medicine shops.

Government hospital and private hospital also here present.

.*Private medical practitioners, alternative medicine etc. not included
