= Tamar block =

Tamar
- Community development block
- Coordinates: 23.05°N 85.64°E
- Country: India
- State: Jharkhand
- District: Ranchi

Government
  - Type: Federal democracy

Area
  - Total: 513.43 km^{2} (198.24 sq mi)

Population (2011)
  - Total: 132,672
  - Density: 258.40/km^{2} (669.26/sq mi)

Languages
  - Official: Hindi, Urdu
- Time zone: UTC+5:30 (IST)
- PIN: 835225
- Telephone/STD code: 06585
- Literacy: 62.76%
- Lok Sabha constituency: Khunti
- Vidhan Sabha constituency: Tamar
- Website: ranchi.nic.in

Tamar block is a CD block that forms an administrative division in the Bundu subdivision of Ranchi district, in the Indian state of Jharkhand.

== Maoist activities, dissent ==
Jharkhand is one of the states affected by Maoist activities. As of 2012, Ranchi district was among the highly affected districts in the state. "Areas of Tamar, Bundu, Sonahatu, Angarha, Sikidari Police Stations and Rahe O.P. have been widely affected by activities of CPI (Maoist) group till the end of year 2009. At the end of year 2010, The activities of CPI (Maoist) group has been minimized up to almost zero level."

According to the Jharkhand Police spokesperson and Inspector General (IG) Saket Singh, as reported on 8 December 2020, "The activities of CPI-Maoist are now confined to small pockets in the state because of our efforts." Civilian fatalities, a key index of security in a region, declined from 20 in 2019, to 8 in 2020, the lowest in this category since 2000, when there were 13 such fatalities. The 28 total fatalities recorded in 2020 are also the lowest overall fatalities recorded in the state in a year since 2000, when they stood at 36.

Ranchi being the capital city of the state has always been under minute scrutiny of all. The arrest, from his home in Ranchi on 9 October 2020, by the NIA, of 83-years old Stan Swamy, Jesuit priest and activist, working with tribals for decades, and his subsequent death in custody, in a Mumbai hospital, on 5 July 2021, has been widely discussed.

== Geography ==
Tamar is located at 23.05°N 85.64°E.

Tamar CD block is located on the Lower Chota Nagpur Plateau. It has an average elevation of 500–1,000 feet (150–300 m) above mean sea level.

Tamar CD block is bounded by the Bundu and Sonahatu CD blocks on the north, Ichagarh and Chandil CD blocks in Seraikela Kharswan district on the east, Kharswan and Kuchai CD blocks in Serikela Kharswan district on the south and Arki (Tamar II) CD block in Khunti district on the west.

Tamar CD block has an area of 513.43 km^{2}.Tamar police station serves Tamar CD block. The headquarters of Tamar CD block is located at Tamar village.

== Demographics ==
=== Population ===
According to the 2011 Census of India, Tamar CD block had a total population of 132,672, all of which were rural. There were 67,073 (51%) males and 65,599 (49%) females. Population in the age range 0–6 years was 19,793. Scheduled Castes numbered 15,315 (11.54%) and Scheduled Tribes numbered 56,925 (42.91%).

The percentage of Scheduled Tribes in Ranchi district, in 2011, was 47.67% of the population (rural) in the blocks. The percentage of Scheduled Tribes, numbering 1,042,016, in the total population of Ranchi district numbering 2,914,253 in 2011, was 35.76%. The Oraons forming 18.20% of the population and the Mundas forming 10.30% of the population, were the main tribes. Other tribes included (percentage of population in brackets) Lohra (2.46), Bedia (1.32) and Mahli (1.09).

Large villages (with 4,000+ population) Tamar CD block are (2011 census figures in brackets): Parasi (4,208) and Tamar (12,346).

=== Literacy ===
As of 2011 census, the total number of literate persons in Tamar CD block was 70,845 (62.76% of the population over 6 years) out of which males numbered 43,881 (76.98% of the male population over 6 years) and females numbered 26,964 (48.25% of the female population over 6 years). The gender disparity (the difference between female and male literacy rates) was 28.73%.

As of 2011 census, literacy in Ranchi district was 77.13%. Literacy in Jharkhand was 67.63% in 2011. Literacy in India in 2011 was 74.04%.

See also – List of Jharkhand districts ranked by literacy rate

Literacy in CD Blocks of
Ranchi district
Ranchi Sadar subdivision
Burmu – 64.54%
Khelari – 74.83%
Kanke – 73.75%
Ormanjhi – 67.53%
Silli – 73.73%
Angara – 64.92%
Namkum – 73.72%
Ratu – 73.00%
Nagri – 71.59%
Mandar – 67.63%
Chanho – 66.81%
Bero – 67.49%
Itki – 73.58%
Lapung – 60.29%
Bundu subdivision
Rahe – 69.19%
Bundu – 66.38%
Sonahatu – 66.04%
Tamar – 62.76%
Source: 2011 Census: CD block Wise
Primary Census Abstract Data

=== Language and religion ===
Religions in Tamar I CD block (2011)
| Religion | Percent |
| Hinduism | 62.93% |
| Others* | 32.17% |
| Christianity | 2.48% |
| Islam | 1.58% |
| Other or not stated | 0.84% |
*mainly tribal religions like Sarna

Hindi is the official language in Jharkhand and Urdu has been declared as an additional official language.

Languages in Tamar I CD block (2011)
1. Panchpargania (64.1%)
2. Mundari (24.9%)
3. Hindi (4.60%)
4. Bengali (3.83%)
5. Others (2.61%)

== Rural poverty ==
60-70% of the population of Ranchi district were in the BPL category in 2004–2005. In 2011–12, the proportion of BPL population in Ranchi district came down to 27.82%. According to a study in 2013 (modified in 2019), "the incidence of poverty in Jharkhand is estimated at 46%, but 60% of the scheduled castes and scheduled tribes are still below poverty line."

== Economy ==
=== Livelihood ===
Livelihood
in Tamar CD block
1. Cultivators (33.7%)
2. Agricultural labourers (54.4%)
3. Household industries (2.98%)
4. Other Workers (9.01%)

In Tamar CD block in 2011, amongst the class of total workers, cultivators numbered 24,238 and formed 33.66%, agricultural labourers numbered 39,137 and formed 54.35%, household industry workers numbered 2,147 and formed 2.98% and other workers numbered 6,487 and formed 9.01%. Total workers numbered 72,009 and formed 54.28% of the total population, and non-workers numbered 60,663 and formed 45.72% of the population.

=== Infrastructure ===
There are 128 inhabited villages in Tamar CD block. In 2011, 8 villages had power supply. 16 villages had tap water (treated/ untreated), 128 villages had well water (covered/ uncovered), 125 villages had hand pumps, and all villages have drinking water facility. 5 villages had post offices, 12 villages had sub post offices, 3 village had telephones (land lines), 38 villages had mobile phone coverage. 115 villages had pucca (paved) village roads, 8 villages had bus service (public/ private), 6 villages had autos/ modified autos, 5 villages had taxi/vans, 62 villages had tractors. 5 villages had bank branches, 5 villages had agricultural credit societies, 2 villages had public distribution system, 112 villages had assembly polling stations.

=== Agriculture ===
In Ranchi district, 23% of the total area is covered with forests. "With the gradual deforestation of the district, more and more land is being brought under cultivation." Terraced low lands are called don and the uplands are called tanr. The hill streams remain almost dry, except in the rainy season, and does not offer much scope for irrigation.

In Tamar CD block, 49.15% of the total area was cultivable, in 2011. Out of this, 3.00% was irrigated land.

=== Backward Regions Grant Fund ===
Ranchi district is listed as a backward region and receives financial support from the Backward Regions Grant Fund. The fund, created by the Government of India, is designed to redress regional imbalances in development. As of 2012, 272 districts across the country were listed under this scheme. The list includes 21 districts of Jharkhand.

== Transport ==
National Highway 43 (earlier NH 33) (Ranchi-Bundu-Tamar-Chandil-Jamshedpur), an important roadway in Ranchi district, passes through Tamar block.

== Education ==
Tamar CD block had 6 villages with pre-primary schools, 115 villages with primary schools, 58 villages with middle schools, 9 villages with secondary schools, 3 villages with senior secondary schools, 1 village had vocational training centre/ ITI, 4 villages had non-formal training centres, 13 villages with no educational facility.
.*Senior secondary schools are also known as Inter colleges in Jharkhand

== Healthcare ==
Tamar CD block had 2 villages with primary health centres, 26 villages with primary health subcentres, 9 villages with maternity and child welfare centres, 1 village with allopathic hospital, 1 village with dispensary, 1 village with veterinary hospital, 7 villages with family welfare centres, 29 villages with medicine shops .
.*Private medical practitioners, alternative medicine etc. not included
