= Mahali people =

Scheduled Tribes of India and Bangladesh

Mahali
Total population
- 155,023 in India (2011 census)

Regions with significant populations
- India, Bangladesh
- Jharkhand: 152,663
- West Bengal: 2,360
- Assam: 13,452 (1951 est.)
- Bangladesh: 30,000 (as of 2009)

Languages
- First language Mahali; Second language Santali, Odia, Bengali, Hindi

Religion
- Hinduism

Related ethnic groups
- Santal • Oraon • Kumarbhag Paharia • Mal Paharia

The Mahali (colloquially Mahli) are a small ethnic group living in the Indian states of Jharkhand, Odisha and West Bengal. Basketry is their main occupation. and in the northern districts of Rajshahi, Joypurhat, Dinajpur, Rangpur and Sylhet of Bangladesh. They speak the Mahali language, which belongs to the Munda group, and many of them also know Odia, Santali, Bengali, and Hindi. In India they are included in the list of Scheduled Tribe.

The Mahali of Bangladesh ir forefathers migrated from the Buru Disham hills of Jharkhand over a century ago. They speak either Mahali or Santali, though today's educated generation speak Bengali and English as well. There are 3 tribes among them: Nagpuriya, Sikroya and Rajmahle. A total of 9 family names can be found among the Mahles – Dumri, Bare, Karkusho, Kauria, Khanger, Mandri, Hansda, Baske & Besra, of which the first 4 family names are almost extinct today.

== Origin ==
They are caste who works as palanquin bearers and bamboo workers. They are divided into five endogamous subdivision: the bansphor Mahli, pahar mahli, Sulunkhi, Tanti and Mahli Munda. Their some septs are Barwar (banayan), Bhuktuar, dumriar (wild fig), gundli (a kind of grain), Induar (eel), Kantiar, Kasriar, Kathargachh (jackfruit tree), Kendriar, Kerketta (a bird), mahukal (a bird), Tirki, Tunduar, Turu, Lang Chenre, Sanga. Their four septs Hansda, Hemron, Murmu, Saren also found in Santal tribe.

== Culture ==
Their traditional occupation was making households items of bamboo.

They were also making musical instruments such as Mandar, Dhol, Nagara etc.

Their deity is Surjahi (Solar deity). Other deity are Bar Pahari (mountain deity) and Mansa Devi. Their festival are Bangri, Hariyari and Nawakhani etc.

== Official classification ==
They are listed as a Scheduled Tribe by the Jharkhand government.

== Traditions in Bangladesh ==
The Mahali people cannot marry within close relatives or within their own tribe. There are two ways of effecting the marriage – Angir Bapla & Sunum Bapla. The society is patriarchal, and in marriages the family of the bridegroom pays dowry to the family of the bride. Children bear the family name inherited from the father. The primary profession of the community is manufacturing useful household articles using bamboo, e.g., dali (bin), kula (an indigenous multipurpose article used in processing rice/paddy), tungki (a bamboo-made pot to keep salt), hand propelled fan, etc., and selling these in the local markets. They earn very little each day, but live on whatever their traditional trade fetches them. Intra-community harmony is excellent. Their food habits are just like those of other Bangladeshi residents of the region, although they do not eat crab, oyster or pork. Their attire is a mixture of Bangladeshi Muslim and Hindu culture, though many Mahalis wear modern dresses like shirt-trousers and salwar-kameez.

Mahali children are not proficient at Bengali Medium primary schools because there is hardly any scope of learning Bengali in their environment. The native tongue of the Mahle community has no written form. Mr. Zakarias Dumri, Director-MAASAUS and a Mahali by himself, has invented a Romanized Mahle alphabet for their language, which is being used experimentally in 3 primary schools of Damkurahat, Paba, Rajshahi. The schools are Sursunipara, Sinjaghutu and Pipra Multi Linguistic Education (MLE) schools. This new alphabet allows Mahali children to study in Bengali as well as their native language, and, as a result, literacy has increased in that area. Children are also showing better results in the schools. Teachers of the school and NGOs named SIL-Bangladesh and Manusher Jonno (for the mankind) are helping the children in this endeavour.

There are three major festivals of the Mahalis – Jitiya Parbon, Syurjahi Puja and Goal Puja, falling in the months of Bhadra (Mid-August to Mid September) and Falgun (Mid February to Mid March) of the Bengali calendar. Singing and dancing are integral parts of their festivals and celebrations. Jhumer is a prominent form of dance among this community, and almost every Mahle is adept at this dance (However, many Mahalis of the current generation do not know this dance well). They use traditional musical instruments in their music and dance. They refrain from all household activities on the festival days in the belief that acting otherwise might bring bad luck to their family. They cremate their dead as the Hindus do. Kula (Hatak in their language) is very important in their day-to-day life, as well as in religious practices. They use the kula to harvest rice and value the Kula as a religious symbol.

== See also ==
- Ghasi Ram Mahli, poet
- Surya Singh Besra, politician
