= Bundu subdivision =

- Subdivision
- Location in Jharkhand, India Bundu subdivision (India)
- Coordinates: 23.18°N 85.58°E
- Country: India
- State: Jharkhand
- District: Ranchi
- Headquarters: Bundu

Government
  - Type: Federalism in India

Languages
  - Official: Hindi, Urdu
- Time zone: IST
- Website: ranchi.nic.in

Bundu subdivision is an administrative subdivision in the Ranchi district of the South Chotanagpur division in the state of Jharkhand, India.

== Overview ==
Ranchi district is a part of the Ranchi plateau, most of it at an average elevation of 2,140 feet above sea level. Only a small portion in the north-eastern part of the district is the lower Ranchi plateau, spread over Silli, Rahe, Sonahatu and Tamar CD blocks, at an elevation of 500 to 1,000 feet above sea level. There is a 16 km long ridge south-west of Ranchi. There are isolated hills in the central plateau.

== Administrative divisions ==
Cities, towns and locations in Ranchi district in South Chotanagpur Division
M: municipality, CT: census town, R: rural/ urban centre, N: neighbourhood, T: tourist centre, D: dam, H: historical/ religious subdivision
Owing to space constraints in the small map, the actual locations in a larger map may vary slightly

Ranchi district is divided into two sub-divisions:Ranchi Sadar subdivision and Bundu subdivision. Ranchi Sadar subdivision consists of 14 CD blocks: Kanke, Ratu, Chanho, Mandar, Lapung, Burmu, Bero, Namkum, Ormanjhi, Angara, Silli, Khelari, Nagri and Itki. Bundu subdivision consists of 4 CD blocks: Rahe, Bundu, Sonahatu and Tamar. The details of the CD blocks are given below for the respective subdivision.

There are two statutory towns in the district - Ranchi is a municipal corporation housing the headquarters of Ranchi Sadar subdivision, and Bundu is a nagar panchayat, housing the headquarters of Bundu subdivision. There are thirteen census towns in Ranchi district, all are in Ranchi Sadar subdivision: Bisrampur, Churi, Ray, Khelari, Kanke, Arsande, Ibra, Muri, Tati, Ara, Bargarwa, Ratu and Tundul.

== Police stations ==
The following police stations are located in the Bundu subdivision: Bundu, Sonahatu, Tamar and Mahila Bundu. There is a police outpost at Rahe,

== Blocks ==
Community development blocks in the Bundu subdivision are:

CD Block	Headquarters	Area km^{2}	Population (2011)	SC %	ST %	Literacy rate %	CT
Bundu	Bundu	250.85	61,921	5.46	59.82	66.38	-
Rahe	Jharkhand	180.42	53,916	6.50	32.11	69.19	-
Sunahatu	Sonahatu	273.12	77,252	7.92	23.89	66.04	-
Tamar	Tamar	513.43	132,672	11.54	42.91	62.76	-
