= Ray, Jharkhand =

Ray
- Census Town
- Location in Jharkhand, India3 Ray (India)
- Coordinates: 23.6851°N 85.0535°E
- Country: India
- State: Jharkhand
- District: Ranchi

Government
  - Type: Federal democracy

Area
  - Total: 5.85 km^{2} (2.26 sq mi)

Population (2011)
  - Total: 6,977
  - Density: 1,190/km^{2} (3,090/sq mi)

Languages (*For language details see Khelari block#Language and religion)
  - Official: Hindi, Urdu
- Time zone: UTC+5:30 (IST)
- PIN: 829210
- Telephone/ STD code: 06530
- Vehicle registration: JH 01
- Literacy: 77.17%
- Lok Sabha constituency: Ranchi
- Vidhan Sabha constituency: Kanke
- Website: ranchi.nic.in

Ray is a census town in the Khelari CD block in the Ranchi Sadar subdivision of the Ranchi district in the Indian state of Jharkhand.

== Geography ==
Cities, towns and locations in Ranchi district in South Chotanagpur Division
M: municipality, CT: census town, R: rural/ urban centre, N: neighbourhood, T: tourist centre, D: dam, H: historical/ religious centre
Owing to space constraints in the small map, the actual locations in a larger map may vary slightly

=== Location ===
Ray is located at 23.6851°N 85.0535°E.

=== Area overview ===
The map alongside shows a part of the Ranchi plateau, most of it at an average elevation of 2,140 feet above sea level. Only a small part in the north-eastern part of the district is the lower Ranchi plateau, spread over Silli, Rahe, Sonahatu and Tamar CD blocks, at an elevation of 500 to 1,000 feet above sea level. There is a 16 km long ridge south-west of Ranchi. There are isolated hills in the central plateau. The principal river of the district, the Subarnarekha, originates near Ratu, flows in an easterly direction and descends from the plateau, with a drop of about 300 feet at Hundru Falls. Subarnarekha and other important rivers are marked on the map. The forested area is shaded in the map. A major part of the North Karanpura Area and some fringe areas of the Piparwar Area of the Central Coalfields Limited, both located in the North Karanpura Coalfield, are in Ranchi district. There has been extensive industrial activity in Ranchi district, since independence. Ranchi district is the first in the state in terms of population. 8.83% of the total population of the state lives in this district - 56.9% is rural population and 43.1% is urban population.

Note: The map alongside presents some of the notable locations in the district. All places marked in the map are linked in the larger full screen map.

== Demographics ==
According to the 2011 Census of India, Ray had a total population of 6,977, of which 3,677 (53%) were males and 3,300 (47%) were females. Population in the age range 0–6 years was 1,010. The total number of literate persons in Ray was 4,605 (77.17% of the population over 6 years).

== Infrastructure ==
According to the District Census Handbook 2011, Ranchi, Ray covered an area of 5.85 km^{2}. Among the civic amenities, it had 15 km roads with open drains, the protected water supply involved hand pump, tap water from untreated sources,, overhead tank. It had 1,216 domestic electric connections. (There is something wrong with the data provided in the handbook for medical facilities in the census town - it exceeds the facilities for the CD block of which it is a part and also surpasses that of Ranchi city). Among the educational facilities it had 6 primary schools, 5 middle schools, other school facilities at Churi 5 km away. An important commodity it produced was coal. It had the branch office of 1 nationalised bank.

== Economy ==
The projects of the North Karanpura Area of Central Coalfields Ltd. in North Karanpura Coalfield are: Churi underground, Dakra Bukbuka opencast, K.D.H. opencast, Karkatta opencast, Rohini opencast, Purnadih opencast.

== Education ==
Uttari Karnpura Shramik Mahavidyalaya was established at Dakra in 1990.

Government UPG High School is a Hindi-medium coeducational institute established in 1953 at Ray. It has facilities for teaching from class I to class X. It has a library with 455 books.

== Transport ==
There are stations at Ray and Khelari on the Barkakana-Son Nagar line.
