= Khalari =

- Census Town
- Location in Jharkhand, India Khalari (India)
- Coordinates: 23.6501°N 84.9918°E
- Country: India
- State: Jharkhand
- District: Ranchi

Government
  - Type: Federal democracy

Area
  - Total: 16.66 km^{2} (6.43 sq mi)

Population (2011)
  - Total: 20,010
  - Density: 1,201/km^{2} (3,111/sq mi)

Languages*
  - Official: Hindi, Urdu
- Time zone: UTC+5:30 (IST)
- PIN: 829205
- Telephone/ STD code: 06531
- Vehicle registration: JH 1
- Literacy: 75.58%
- Lok Sabha constituency: Ranchi
- Vidhan Sabha constituency: Kanke
- Website: ranchi.nic.in

Khalari (also spelled Khelari) is a census town in the Khelari CD block in the Ranchi Sadar subdivision of the Ranchi district in the Indian State of Jharkhand. It is an area rich in coal.

== Geography ==
Cities, towns and locations in Ranchi district in South Chotanagpur Division
M: municipality, CT: census town, R: rural/ urban centre, N: neighbourhood, T: tourist centre, D: dam, H: historical/religious centre
Owing to space constraints in the small map, the actual locations in a larger map may vary slightly

=== Location ===
Khelari is located at 23.6501°N 84.9918°E.

=== Area overview ===
The map alongside shows a part of the Ranchi plateau, most of it at an average elevation of 2,140 feet above sea level. Only a small part in the north-eastern part of the district is the lower Ranchi plateau, spread over Silli, Rahe, Sonahatu and Tamar CD blocks, at an elevation of 500 to 1,000 feet above sea level. There is a 16 km long ridge south-west of Ranchi. There are isolated hills in the central plateau. The principal river of the district, the Subarnarekha, originates near Ratu, flows in an easterly direction and descends from the plateau, with a drop of about 300 feet at Hundru Falls. Subarnarekha and other important rivers are marked on the map. The forested area is shaded in the map. A major part of the North Karanpura Area and some fringe areas of the Piparwar Area of the Central Coalfields Limited, both located in the North Karanpura Coalfield, are in Ranchi district. There has been extensive industrial activity in Ranchi district, since independence. Ranchi district is the first in the state in terms of population. 8.83% of the total population of the state lives in this district - 56.9% is rural population and 43.1% is urban population.

Note: The map alongside presents some of the notable locations in the district. All places marked in the map are linked in the larger full screen map.

== Demographics ==
According to the 2011 Census of India, Khelari had a total population of 20,010, of which 10,351 (52%) were males and 9,659 (48%) were females. Population in the age range 0–6 years was 2,750. The total number of literate persons in Khelari was 13,045 (75.58% of the population over 6 years).

As of 2001 India census, Khelari had a population of 18,699. Males constitute 53% of the population and females 47%. Khelari has an average literacy rate of 59%, lower than the national average of 59.5%: male literacy is 69%, and female literacy is 49%. In Khelari, 14% of the population is under 6 years of age.

- For language details see Khelari block#Language and religion

== Infrastructure ==
According to the District Census Handbook 2011, Ranchi, Khelari covered an area of 16.66 km^{2}. Among the civic amenities, it had 23 km roads with open drains, the protected water supply involved hand pump, uncovered well. It had 2,801 domestic electric connections, 24 road lighting points. Among the medical facilities, it had 1 hospital, 2 dispensaries, 2 health centres, 1 family welfare centre, 30 maternity and child welfare centres, 30 maternity homes, 1 nursing home, 4 medicine shops. Among the educational facilities it had 6 primary schools, 5 middle schools, 5 secondary schools, 1 senior secondary school, the nearest general degree college at Dakra. It had 1 non-formal educational centres (Sarva Siksha Abhiyan). Among the social, recreational and cultural facilities it had 1 stadium, 1 cinema theatre, 1 auditorium/ community hall, 2 public libraries, 1 reading room. Two important commodities it produced were cement and coal. It had the branch offices of 2 nationalised banks.

== Civic administration ==
=== Police station ===
There is a police station at Khalari.

=== CD block HQ ===
The headquarters of Khalari CD block are located at Khalari town.

== Economy ==
The projects of the North Karanpura Area of Central Coalfields in North Karanpura Coalfield are: Churi underground, Dakra Bukbuka opencast, K.D.H. opencast, Karkatta opencast, Rohini opencast, Purnadih opencast.

== Transport ==
State Highway 7 (Hazaribagh-Tandwa-Bijupada) passes through Khalari.

There are stations at Ray and Khalari on the Barkakana-Son Nagar line.

Khalari has a railway station which has value for the people of Khelari and nearby area as many trains such as Palamou Express and Shaktipunj Express stop here. Khelari is very well connected with Delhi, Ranchi, Kolkata, Dhanbad, Asansol, Daltonganj etc.

== Education ==
Uttari Karnpura Shramik Mahavidyalaya was established at Dakra in 1990.

Janta High School is a Hindi-medium coeducational institution established in 1956 at Khelari. It has facilities for teaching from class IX to class XII. It has a playground and a library with 1,647 books.

DAV Co-Operative Sr Sec School located in Khalari Ranchi Distt Jharkhand is a Co-Educational Senior Secondary institution affiliated to the Central Board of Secondary Education (CBSE) on Provisional basis since 1974. The school has been operating officially under the trust/society DAV College Managing Committee.

Ursuline Convent is an English-medium coeducational established in 1980 at Khelari. It has facilities for teaching from class I to class X. It has a playground, a library with 4,445 books, and has 90 computers for teaching and learning purposes

Adarsh Middle and High School is a Hindi-medium coeducational institution established in 1982 at Khelari. It has facilities for teaching from class I to class X. It has a playground, a library with 2,300 books, and has 12 computers for teaching and learning purposes.

St. Mother High School is a Hindi-medium coeducational institution established in 2000 at Khelari. It has facilities for teaching from class I to class X. It has a playground and has a computer for teaching and learning purposes.
