= Itki, India =

Itki
- Village
- Location in Jharkhand, India Itki (India)
- Coordinates: 23.3568°N 85.1226°E
- Country: India
- State: Jharkhand
- District: Ranchi

Population (2011)
  - Total: 12,174

Languages (*For language details see Itki block#Language and religion)
  - Official: Hindi, Urdu
- Time zone: UTC+5:30 (IST)
- PIN: 835301
- Telephone/ STD code: 06529
- Vehicle registration: JH 01
- Literacy: 82.93%
- Lok Sabha constituency: Lohardaga
- Vidhan Sabha constituency: Mandar
- Website: ranchi.nic.in

Itki (also Itkithakurgaon) is a village with four panchayat Itki East, Itki West, Malti and Semra in the Itki CD block in the Ranchi Sadar subdivision of the Ranchi district in the Indian state of Jharkhand.

== Geography ==
Cities, towns and locations in Ranchi district in South Chotanagpur Division
M: municipality, CT: census town, R: rural/ urban centre, N: neighbourhood, T: tourist centre, D: dam, H: historical/ religious centre
Owing to space constraints in the small map, the actual locations in a larger map may vary slightly

=== Location ===
Itki is located at 23.3568°N 85.1226°E.

=== Area overview ===
The map alongside shows a part of the Ranchi plateau, most of it at an average elevation of 2,140 feet above sea level. Only a small part in the north-eastern part of the district is the lower Ranchi plateau, spread over Silli, Rahe, Sonahatu and Tamar CD blocks, at an elevation of 500 to 1,000 feet above sea level. There is a 16 km long ridge south-west of Ranchi. There are isolated hills in the central plateau. The principal river of the district, the Subarnarekha, originates near Ratu, flows in an easterly direction and descends from the plateau, with a drop of about 300 feet at Hundru Falls. Subarnarekha and other important rivers are marked on the map. The forested area is shaded in the map. A major part of the North Karanpura Area and some fringe areas of the Piparwar Area of the Central Coalfields Limited, both located in the North Karanpura Coalfield, are in Ranchi district. There has been extensive industrial activity in Ranchi district, since independence. Ranchi district is the first in the state in terms of population. 8.83% of the total population of the state lives in this district - 56.9% is rural population and 43.1% is urban population.

Note: The map alongside presents some of the notable locations in the district. All places marked in the map are linked in the larger full screen map.

== Civic administration ==
=== Police station ===
There is a police station at Itki.

=== CD block HQ ===
The headquarters of Itki CD block are located at Itki village.

== Demographics ==
According to the 2011 Census of India, Itkithakurgaon had a total population of 12,174, of which 6,141 (50%) were males and 6,033 (50%) were females. Population in the age range 0–6 years was 1,668. The total number of literate persons in Itkithakurgaon was 8,713 (82.93% of the population over 6 years).

== Transport ==
There is a railway station at Itki on the Ranchi-Tori line. There is a Bus Station at Itki Baazar Tar

== Education ==
Lal Mohan Inter College is a Hindi-medium coeducational institution established in 2005. It has facilities for teaching in classes XI and XII.

St. Agnes Balika High School is a Hindi-medium girls only institution established in 1961. It has facilities for teaching from class VII to class X. It has a playground, a library with 1,500 books and has 1 computer for teaching and learning purposes.

Al Kuasar Balika High School is a Hindi-medium girls only institution established in 2008. It has facilities for teaching from class VI to class X.

Itki Balika High School is a Hindi-medium girls only institution established in 1982. It has facilities for teaching in classes IX and X. It has a library with 370 books.

British Public High School is a Hindi-medium coeducational institution established in 2007. It has facilities for teaching from class I to class X. It has a library with 120 books.

Darsgah Islami Itki was established in 1960 under the supervision of Jamat-e-Islami-Hind, however, it's being managed by the local body of Itki. where education up to matriculation is given. This School is counted among the top-rated Schools in Jharkhand with an excellent academic track record.

== Social environment ==
The village has a mixed population of Hindu, Muslim, and Christian communities, with multiple mosques, temples, and churches located throughout the area. The local economy is primarily agricultural, alongside a commercial sector of local business owners. A biweekly market takes place on Wednesdays and Saturdays, attracting buyers and sellers from surrounding regions.

== Healthcare ==
Itki TB Sanatorium, with 300 beds, is functioning as a dedicated Covid care hospital. NTPC has provided a Centralised Oxygen Support System as a part of its corporate social responsibility programme. There is a proposal to convert it to a multi-speciality hospital.
