= Irba =

- Census Town
- Location in Jharkhand, India3 Irba (India)
- Coordinates: 23.4574°N 85.4424°E
- Country: India
- State: Jharkhand
- District: Ranchi

Government
  - Type: Federal democracy

Area
  - Total: 2.81 km^{2} (1.08 sq mi)

Population (2011)
  - Total: 5,210
  - Density: 1,850/km^{2} (4,800/sq mi)

Languages (*For language details see Ormanjhi block#Language and religion)
  - Official: Hindi, Urdu
- Time zone: UTC+5:30 (IST)
- PIN: 829210
- Telephone/ STD code: 06530
- Vehicle registration: JH 01
- Literacy: 77.54%
- Lok Sabha constituency: Ranchi
- Vidhan Sabha constituency: Ranchi
- Website: ranchi.nic.in

Irba is a census town in the Ormanjhi CD block in the Ranchi Sadar subdivision of the Ranchi district in the Indian state of Jharkhand.

== Geography ==
Cities, towns and locations in Ranchi district in South Chotanagpur Division
M: municipality, CT: census town, R: rural/ urban centre, N: neighbourhood, T: tourist centre, D: dam, H: historical/ religious centre
Owing to space constraints in the small map, the actual locations in a larger map may vary slightly

=== Location ===
Irba is located at 23.4574°N 85.4424°E.

=== Area overview ===
The map alongside shows a part of the Ranchi plateau, most of it at an average elevation of 2,140 feet (650 m) above sea level. Only a small part in the north-eastern part of the district is the lower Ranchi plateau, spread over Silli, Rahe, Sonahatu and Tamar CD blocks, at an elevation of 500 to 1,000 feet (150 to 300 m). There is a 16 km (9.9 mi) long ridge south-west of Ranchi. There are isolated hills in the central plateau. The principal river of the district, the Subarnarekha, originates near Ratu, flows in an easterly direction and descends from the plateau, with a drop of about 300 feet (91 m) at Hundru Falls. Subarnarekha and other important rivers are marked on the map. The forested area is shaded in the map. A major part of the North Karanpura Area and some fringe areas of the Piparwar Area of the Central Coalfields Limited, both located in the North Karanpura Coalfield, are in Ranchi district. There has been extensive industrial activity in Ranchi district, since independence. Ranchi district is the first in the state in terms of population. 8.83% of the total population of the state lives in this district - 56.9% is rural population and 43.1% is urban population.

Note: The map alongside presents some of the notable locations in the district. All places marked in the map are linked in the larger full screen map.

== Demographics ==
According to the 2011 Census of India, Irba had a total population of 5,210, of which 2,476 (53%) were males and 2,464 (47%) were females. Population aged six and under was 789. The total number of literate persons in Irba was 3,428 (77.54% of the population over six years).

== Infrastructure ==
According to the District Census Handbook 2011, Ranchi, Irba covered an area of 2.81 km^{2} (1.08 sq mi). Among the civic amenities, it had three km (1.9 mi) of roads with both closed and open drains, the protected water supply involved uncovered well, hand pump. It had 675 domestic electric connections. Among the medical facilities, it had four hospitals, three dispensaries, three health centres, five family welfare centres, two maternity and child welfare centres, two maternity homes, two nursing homes, five medicine shops. Among the educational facilities it had one primary school, three middle schools, one secondary school, Other educational facilities at Dardag, five km (3.1 mi) away. Three important commodities it produced were soap, bakery products, handicrafts. It had the branch offices of two nationalised bank and one agricultural credit society.

== Transport ==
National Highway 20 (earlier NH 33) (Ranchi-Ramgarh-Hazaribagh Road), an important roadway in Ranchi district, passes through Ormanjhi.

== Education ==
A.R. Ansari Memorial High School is a Hindi-medium coeducational institution established in 1982. It has facilities for teaching from class VIII to class X. It has a play ground and a library with 2,500 books.

Florence College of Nursing was established at Irba in 2003–04. It offers nursing courses starting from general nursing & midwifery to post graduate levels, as well as paramedical and pharmacy courses.

Shine – Abdur Razzaque Ansari Institute of Health Education & Research, a private college established in 2009, offers different courses in nursing, allied health sciences etc.

Amrita College of Nursing is a private college at Hutup, PO Irba.

Shaswat Institute of Teacher's Education at Hutup, PO Irba, offers a degree course in education. It has bus facility for pickup from Ranchi.

== Healthcare ==
Abdur Razzaque Ansari Memorial Weavers Hospital (Apollo Hospital Group) was established by the Chhotanagpur Regional Handloom Weavers Co-operative Union Ltd. in 1996.
