= Churi =

- Census Town
- Location in Jharkhand, India Churi (India)
- Coordinates: 23.68211°N 85.01981°E
- Country: India
- State: Jharkhand
- District: Ranchi

Government
  - Type: Federal democracy

Area
  - Total: 16.78 km^{2} (6.48 sq mi)

Population (2011)
  - Total: 24,876
  - Density: 1,482/km^{2} (3,840/sq mi)

Languages (*For language details see Khelari block#Language and religion)
  - Official: Hindi, Urdu
- Time zone: UTC+5:30 (IST)
- PIN: 829210
- Telephone/ STD code: 06530
- Vehicle registration: JH 01
- Literacy: 80.21%
- Lok Sabha constituency: Ranchi
- Vidhan Sabha constituency: Kanke
- Website: ranchi.nic.in

Churi is a census town located in the Khelari CD block in the Ranchi Sadar subdivision of Ranchi district in the state of Jharkhand, India.

== Geography ==
Cities, towns and locations in Ranchi district in South Chotanagpur Division
M: municipality, CT: census town, R: rural/ urban centre, N: neighbourhood, T: tourist centre, D: dam, H: historical/ religious centre
Owing to space constraints in the small map, the actual locations in a larger map may vary slightly

=== Location ===
Churi is located at 23.68211°N 85.01981°E.

Churi is 60 km west of Ranchi city.

=== Area overview ===
The map alongside shows a part of the Ranchi plateau, most of it at an average elevation of 2,140 feet above sea level. Only a small part in the north-eastern part of the district is the lower Ranchi plateau, spread over Silli, Rahe, Sonahatu and Tamar CD blocks, at an elevation of 500 to 1,000 feet above sea level. There is a 16 km long ridge south-west of Ranchi. There are isolated hills in the central plateau. The principal river of the district, the Subarnarekha, originates near Ratu, flows in an easterly direction and descends from the plateau, with a drop of about 300 feet at Hundru Falls. Subarnarekha and other important rivers are marked on the map. The forested area is shaded in the map. A major part of the North Karanpura Area and some fringe areas of the Piparwar Area of the Central Coalfields Limited, both located in the North Karanpura Coalfield, are in Ranchi district. There has been extensive industrial activity in Ranchi district, since independence. Ranchi district is the first in the state in terms of population. 8.83% of the total population of the state lives in this district - 56.9% is rural population and 43.1% is urban population.

Note: The map alongside presents some of the notable locations in the district. All places marked in the map are linked in the larger full screen map.

== Demographics ==
According to the 2011 Census of India, Churi had a total population of 24,876, of which 12,995 (52%) were males and 11,881 (48%) were females. Population in the age range 0–6 years was 3,239. The total number of literate persons in Churi was 1,7354 (80.21% of the population over 6 years).

As of 2001 India census, Churi had a population of 25,075. Males constitute 55% of the population and females 45%. Churi has an average literacy rate of 66%, higher than the national average of 59.5%: male literacy is 76% and, female literacy is 54%. In Churi, 15% of the population is under 6 years of age.

== Infrastructure ==
According to the District Census Handbook 2011, Ranchi, Churi covered an area of 16.78 km^{2}. Among the civic amenities, it had 70 km roads with both open and closed drains, the protected water supply involved tap water from treated sources, uncovered well, overhead tank. It had 4,813 domestic electric connections, 155 road lighting points. Among the medical facilities, it had 1 hospital, 6 dispensaries, 6 health centres, 1 family welfare centre, 2 maternity and child welfare centres, 2 maternity homes, 45 nursing homes, 5 medicine shops. Among the educational facilities it had 11 primary schools, 2 middle schools, 2 secondary schools, 1 senior secondary school. It had 3 non-formal educational centres (Sarva Siksha Abhiyan). Among the social, recreational and cultural facilities it had 1 stadium. An important commodity it produced was coal. It had the branch offices of 4 nationalised banks.

== Economy ==
The projects of the North Karanpura Area of Central Coalfields Ltd. in North Karanpura Coalfield are: Churi underground, Dakra Bukbuka opencast, K.D.H. opencast, Karkatta opencast, Rohini opencast, Purnadih opencast.

== Transport ==
Nearest railway stations are Ray (2 km), Khalari (7 km) and Mccluskieganj (16.5 km). Nearest airports are Birsa Munda Airport, Ranchi (70 km) and NetaJi Subhas Chandra Bose International Airport, Kolkata (460 km).

== Education ==
Uttari Karnpura Shramik Mahavidyalaya was established at Dakra in 1990.

Vidya Vikash Kendra is a Hindi-medium coeducational institution established in 1983 at Churi. It has facilities for teaching from class VIII to class X. It has a library with 300 books.
