= Khelari block =

Khelari
- Community development block
- Coordinates: 23.6813°N 84.9928°E
- Country: India
- State: Jharkhand
- District: Ranchi

Government
  - Type: Federal democracy

Area
  - Total: 131.38 km^{2} (50.73 sq mi)

Population (2011)
  - Total: 78,219
  - Density: 595.36/km^{2} (1,542.0/sq mi)

Languages
  - Official: Hindi
- Time zone: UTC+5:30 (IST)
- PIN: 829210
- Telephone/STD code: 06530
- Literacy: 74.83%
- Lok Sabha constituency: Ranchi
- Vidhan Sabha constituency: Kanke
- Website: ranchi.nic.in

Khelari is a community development block (CD block) that forms an administrative division in the Ranchi Sadar subdivision of the Ranchi district, Jharkhand state, India.

== Geography ==
Khelari is located at 23.6813°N 84.9928°E.

Khelari CD block is located on the Ranchi plateau proper. It has an average elevation of 2,140 feet (650 m) above mean sea level and the land is undulating.

Khelari CD block is bounded by the Tandwa CD block in Chatra district and Keredari CD block in Hazaribagh district on the north, Burmu CD block on the east, Chanho CD block on the south and Chandwa and Balumath CD blocks in Latehar district on the west.

Khelari CD block has an area of 131.38 km^{2}.Khelari police station serves Khelari CD block. The headquarters of Khelari CD block is located at Khelari town.

== Demographics ==
=== Population ===
According to the 2011 Census of India, Khelari CD block had a total population of 78,219, of which 21,869 were rural and 58,350 were urban. There were 40,553 (52%) males and 37,666 (48%) females. Population in the age range 0–6 years was 11,245. Scheduled Castes numbered 14,473 (18.50%) and Scheduled Tribes numbered 15,527 (19.85%).

The percentage of Scheduled Tribes in Ranchi district, in 2011, was 47.67% of the population (rural) in the blocks. The percentage of Scheduled Tribes, numbering 1,042,016, in the total population of Ranchi district numbering 2,914,253 in 2011, was 35.76%. The Oraons forming 18.20% of the population and the Mundas forming 10.30% of the population, were the main tribes. Other tribes included (percentage of population in brackets) Lohra (2.46), Bedia (1.32) and Mahli (1.09).

Census towns in Khelari CD block are as follows (2011 population figure in brackets): Bishrampur (4,487), Churi (24,876), Ray (6,977), and Khelari (20,010).

The only large village (with 4,000+ population) in Khelari CD block is (2011 census figures in brackets): Tumang (4,678).

=== Literacy ===
As of 2011 census, the total number of literate persons in Khelari CD block was 50,117 (74.83% of the population over 6 years) out of which males numbered 28,955 (83.45% of the male population over 6 years) and females numbered 21,162 (65.57% of the female population over 6 years). The gender disparity (the difference between female and male literacy rates) was 17.88%.

As of 2011 census, literacy in Ranchi district was 77.13%. Literacy in Jharkhand was 67.63% in 2011. Literacy in India in 2011 was 74.04%.

See also – List of Jharkhand districts ranked by literacy rate

Literacy in CD Blocks of
Ranchi district
Ranchi Sadar subdivision
Burmu – 64.54%
Khelari – 74.83%
Kanke – 73.75%
Ormanjhi – 67.53%
Silli – 73.73%
Angara – 64.92%
Namkum – 73.72%
Ratu – 73.00%
Nagri – 71.59%
Mandar – 67.63%
Chanho – 66.81%
Bero – 67.49%
Itki – 73.58%
Lapung – 60.29%
Bundu subdivision
Rahe – 69.19%
Bundu – 66.38%
Sonahatu – 66.04%
Tamar – 62.76%
Source: 2011 Census: CD block Wise
Primary Census Abstract Data

=== Language and religion ===
Religions in Khelari CD block (2011)
Religion	Percent
Hinduism	77.70%
Islam	10.86%
Others*	7.76%
Christianity	3.24%
Other or not stated	0.74%
*mainly tribal religions like Sarna

Languages of Khelari block (2011)
1. Sadri (38.9%)
2. Hindi (37.2%)
3. Kurukh (4.68%)
4. Magahi (4.27%)
5. Urdu (3.47%)
6. Bhojpuri (3.46%)
7. Khortha (2.58%)
8. Mundari (1.00%)
9. Bengali (0.91%)
10. Others (3.48%)

At the time of the 2011 census, 38.94% of the population spoke Sadri, 37.21% Hindi, 4.68% Kurukh, 4.27% Magahi, 3.47% Urdu, 3.46% Bhojpuri, 2.58% Khortha, 1.00% Mundari and 0.91% Bengali as their first language.

Hindi is the official language in Jharkhand and Urdu has been declared as an additional official language.

== Rural poverty ==
60-70% of the population of Ranchi district were in the BPL category in 2004–2005. In 2011-12, the proportion of BPL population in Ranchi district came down to 27.82%. According to a study in 2013 (modified in 2019),"the incidence of poverty in Jharkhand is estimated at 46%, but 60% of the scheduled castes and scheduled tribes are still below poverty line."

== Economy ==
=== Livelihood ===
Livelihood
in Khelari CD block
1. Cultivators (9.75%)
2. Agricultural labourers (8.19%)
3. Household industries (3.24%)
4. Other Workers (78.8%)

In Khelari CD block in 2011, amongst the class of total workers, cultivators numbered 2,193 and formed 9.75%, agricultural labourers numbered 1,843 and formed 8.19%, household industry workers numbered 730 and formed 3.24% and other workers numbered 17,735 and formed 78.82%. Total workers numbered 22,501 and formed 28.77% of the total population, and non-workers numbered 55,718 and formed 71.23% of the population.

=== Infrastructure ===
There are 14 inhabited villages in Khelari CD block. In 2011, 12 villages had power supply. 2 villages had tap water (treated/ untreated), 14 villages had well water (covered/ uncovered), 14 villages had hand pumps, and all villages have drinking water facility. 4 villages had post offices, 1 village had sub post office, 3 villages had telephones (land lines), 12 villages had mobile phone coverage. 4 villages had pucca (paved) village roads, 4 villages had bus service (public/ private), 3 villages had autos/ modified autos, 5 villages had taxi/vans, 9 villages had tractors. 2 villages had bank branches, 1 village had agricultural credit society, 1 village had public library and public reading room. 2 villages had public distribution system, 14 villages had assembly polling stations.

=== Agriculture ===
In Ranchi district, 23% of the total area is covered with forests. “With the gradual deforestation of the district, more and more land is being brought under cultivation.” Terraced low lands are called don and the uplands are called tanr. The hill streams remain almost dry, except in the rainy season, and does not offer much scope for irrigation.

In Khelari CD block, 30.25% of the total area was cultivable, in 2011. Out of this, 0.91% was irrigated land.

=== Coal mining ===
Collieries in the CCL North Karanpura Area (North Karanpura Coalfield)
U: Underground colliery, O: Open Cast colliery, W: Washery, A: Administrative headquarters, CT: census town
Owing to space constraints in the small map, the actual locations in a larger map may vary slightly

The projects of the North Karanpura Area of Central Coalfields Ltd. are: Churi underground, Dakra Bukbuka opencast, K.D.H. opencast, Karkatta opencast, Rohini opencast, Purnadih opencast. It is located in Ranchi district and is part of North Karanpura Coalfield. The projects of the Piparwar Area are: Piparwar opencast, Ray-Bachra underground, Ashoka opencast, Piparwar coal handling plant/ coal preparation plant. It is located marginally in Ranchi district.

=== Backward Regions Grant Fund ===
Ranchi district is listed as a backward region and receives financial support from the Backward Regions Grant Fund. The fund, created by the Government of India, is designed to redress regional imbalances in development. As of 2012, 272 districts across the country were listed under this scheme. The list includes 21 districts of Jharkhand.

== Transport ==
There are stations at Ray and Khelari on the Barkakana-Son Nagar line.

== Education ==
Khelari CD block had 3 villages with pre-primary schools, 13 villages with primary schools, 6 villages with middle schools, 4 villages with secondary schools, 1 village with senior secondary school, 1 village with no educational facility.
.*Senior secondary schools are also known as Inter colleges in Jharkhand

Uttari Karnpura Shramik Mahavidyalaya was established at Dakra in 1990.

== Healthcare ==
Khelari CD block had 4 villages with primary health centres, 4 villages with primary health subcentres, 3 villages with maternity and child welfare centres, 1 village with allopathic hospital, 1 village with dispensary, 2 villages with veterinary hospitals, 2 villages with medicine shops.
.*Private medical practitioners, alternative medicine etc. not included
