= Tati, Ranchi =

Tati Tatisilwai
- Census Town
- Location in Jharkhand, India Tati (India)
- Coordinates: 23.3772°N 85.4290°E
- Country: India
- State: Jharkhand
- District: Ranchi

Government
  - Type: Federal democracy

Area
  - Total: 3.17 km^{2} (1.22 sq mi)

Population (2011)
  - Total: 12,878
  - Density: 4,060/km^{2} (10,500/sq mi)

Languages (*For language details see Namkum#Language and religion)
  - Official: Hindi, Urdu
- Time zone: UTC+5:30 (IST)
- PIN: 834010
- Telephone/STD code: 0651
- Vehicle registration: JH 1
- Literacy: 87.37%
- Lok Sabha constituency: Ranchi
- Vidhan Sabha constituency: Khijri
- Website: ranchi.nic.in

Tati (including Tatisilwai) is a census town in the Namkum CD block in the Ranchi Sadar subdivision of Ranchi district in the Indian state of Jharkhand.

== Geography ==
Cities, towns and locations in Ranchi district in South Chotanagpur Division
M: municipality, CT: census town, R: rural/ urban centre, N: neighbourhood, T: tourist centre, D: dam, H: historical/ religious centre
Owing to space constraints in the small map, the actual locations in a larger map may vary slightly

=== Location ===
Tati is located at 23.3772°N 85.4290°E.

=== Area overview ===
The map alongside shows a part of the Ranchi plateau, most of it at an average elevation of 2,140 feet above sea level. Only a small part in the north-eastern part of the district is the lower Ranchi plateau, spread over Silli, Rahe, Sonahatu and Tamar CD blocks, at an elevation of 500 to 1,000 feet above sea level. There is a 16 km long ridge south-west of Ranchi. There are isolated hills in the central plateau. The principal river of the district, the Subarnarekha, originates near Ratu, flows in an easterly direction and descends from the plateau, with a drop of about 300 feet at Hundru Falls. Subarnarekha and other important rivers are marked on the map. The forested area is shaded in the map. A major part of the North Karanpura Area and some fringe areas of the Piparwar Area of the Central Coalfields Limited, both located in the North Karanpura Coalfield, are in Ranchi district. There has been extensive industrial activity in Ranchi district, since independence. Ranchi district is the first in the state in terms of population. 8.83% of the total population of the state lives in this district - 56.9% is rural population and 43.1% is urban population.

Note: The map alongside presents some of the notable locations in the district. All places marked in the map are linked in the larger full screen map.

== Demographics ==
According to the 2011 Census of India, Tati had a total population of 12,878, of which 6,873 (53%) were males and 6,005 (47%) were females. Population in the age range 0–6 years was 1,554. The total number of literate persons in Tati was 9.894 (87.37% of the population over 6 years).

As of 2001 India census, Tati had a population of 10,496. Males constitute 54% of the population and females 46%. Tati has an average literacy rate of 72%, higher than the national average of 59.5%: male literacy is 80%, and female literacy is 62%. In Tati, 15% of the population is under 6 years of age.

== Infrastructure ==
According to the District Census Handbook 2011, Ranchi, Tati covered an area of 3.17 km^{2}. Among the civic amenities, it had 15 km roads with open drains, the protected water supply involved tap water from treated source, uncovered well, river infiltration gallery. It had 2,301 domestic electric connections, 5 road lighting points. Among the medical facilities, it had 6 hospitals, 2 dispensaries, 2 health centres, 1 family welfare centre, 13 maternity and child welfare centres, 13 maternity homes, 1 nursing homes, 5 medicine shops. Among the educational facilities it had 7 primary school, 1 secondary school, other school facilities at Tatisilwai 4 km away. It had 1 medical college, 1 engineering college, 1 management institute/ college, 1 special school for disabled. Among the social, recreational and cultural facilities it had 2 auditorium/ community halls, 2 public libraries, 2 reading rooms. Three important commodities it produced were plastic goods, bakery products, wooden cartons. It had the branch offices of 1 nationalised bank, 1 cooperative bank, 1 agricultural credit society.

== Civic administration ==
=== Police station ===
There is a police station at Tatislwai.

== Transport ==
Tatisilwai railway station is on the Netaji S.C.Bose Gomoh–Hatia line. It is also on the Koderma–Hazaribagh–Barkakana–Ranchi line. The Barkakana-Koderma sector is in operation and, as of 2021, the Ranchi-Barkakana sector is partially operable and is nearing completion.

== Education ==
Kamla Nehru Inter College is a Hindi-medium coeducational institution established in 1982. It has facilities for teaching in classes XI and XII. It has a library with 1,884 books.

Swarnarekha Public High School is a Hindi-medium coeducational institution established in 1995. It has facilities for teaching from class I to class X. It has a library with 450 books and has 13 computers for teaching and learning purposes.

Cambridge School is an English-medium coeducational day and residential institution established in 1992. It follows the Central Board of Secondary Education syllabus up to the senior secondary level.

Cambridge Institute of Technology was established at Tatisilwai, 16 km from Ranchi, in 2001. It offers courses in engineering, management, applied sciences etc.

== Healthcare ==
There is an ESIC dispensary at Tatisilwai.
