= Itki (disambiguation) =

Itki is a town in Djibouti.

Itki may also refer to:

- Itki block, an administrative division in Ranchi district, Jharkhand, India
- Itki, India, a village in Ranchi district, Jharkhand, India
