= Nagri block =

Nagri
- Community development block
- Coordinates: 23.3327°N 85.1868°E
- Country: India
- State: Jharkhand
- District: Ranchi

Government
  - Type: Federal democracy

Area
  - Total: 121.93 km^{2} (47.08 sq mi)

Population (2011)
  - Total: 76,442
  - Density: 626.93/km^{2} (1,623.8/sq mi)

Languages
  - Official: Hindi, Urdu
- Time zone: UTC+5:30 (IST)
- PIN: 835303
- Telephone/STD code: 06529
- Literacy: 71.59%
- Lok Sabha constituency: Ranchi
- Vidhan Sabha constituency: Hatia
- Website: ranchi.nic.in

Nagri is a CD block that forms an administrative division in the Ranchi Sadar subdivision of Ranchi district, in the Indian state of Jharkhand.

== Maoist activities, dissent ==
Jharkhand is one of the states affected by Maoist activities. As of 2012, Ranchi district was among the highly affected districts in the state. "Areas of Tamar, Bundu, Sonahatu, Angarha, Sikidari Police Stations and Rahe O.P. have been widely affected by activities of CPI (Maoist) group till the end of year 2009. At the end of year 2010, The activities of CPI (Maoist) group has been minimized up to almost zero level."

According to the Jharkhand Police spokesperson and Inspector General (IG) Saket Singh, as reported on 8 December 2020, "The activities of CPI-Maoist are now confined to small pockets in the state because of our efforts." Civilian fatalities, a key index of security in a region, declined from 20 in 2019, to 8 in 2020, the lowest in this category since 2000, when there were 13 such fatalities. The 28 total fatalities recorded in 2020 are also the lowest overall fatalities recorded in the state in a year since 2000, when they stood at 36.

Ranchi being the capital city of the state has always been under minute scrutiny of all. The arrest, from his home in Ranchi on 9 October 2020, by the NIA, of 83-years old Stan Swamy, Jesuit priest and activist, working with tribals for decades, and his subsequent death in custody, in a Mumbai hospital, on 5 July 2021, has been widely discussed.

== Geography ==
Nagri is located at 23.3327°N 85.1868°E.

Nagri CD block is located on the Ranchi plateau proper. It has an average elevation of 2,140 feet (650 m) above mean sea level and the land is undulating.

Nagri CD block is bounded by the Ratu and Kanke CD blocks on the north, Namkum CD block on the east, Karra CD block in Khunti district on the south and Itki CD block on the west.

Nagri CD block has an area of 121.93 km^{2}.Nagri police station serves Nagri CD block. The headquarters of Nagri CD block is located at Nagri town.

== Demographics ==
=== Population ===
According to the 2011 Census of India, Nagri CD block had a total population of 76,442, of which 65,252 were rural and 11,190 were urban. There were 38,558 (50%) males and 37,884 (50%) females. Population in the age range 0–6 years was 11,195. Scheduled Castes numbered 2,115 (2.77%) and Scheduled Tribes numbered 38,326 (50.14%).

The percentage of Scheduled Tribes in Ranchi district, in 2011, was 47.67% of the population (rural) in the blocks. The percentage of Scheduled Tribes, numbering 1,042,016, in the total population of Ranchi district numbering 2,914,253 in 2011, was 35.76%. The Oraons forming 18.20% of the population and the Mundas forming 10.30% of the population, were the main tribes. Other tribes included (percentage of population in brackets) Lohra (2.46), Bedia (1.32) and Mahli (1.09).

The only census town in Nagri CD block was (2011 population figure in brackets): Tundul (11,190).

=== Literacy ===
As of 2011 census, the total number of literate persons in Nagri CD block was 46,710 (71.59% of the population over 6 years) out of which males numbered 26,499 (80.80% of the male population over 6 years) and females numbered 20,211 (62.28% of the female population over 6 years). The gender disparity (the difference between female and male literacy rates) was 18.53%.

As of 2011 census, literacy in Ranchi district was 77.13%. Literacy in Jharkhand was 67.63% in 2011. Literacy in India in 2011 was 74.04%.

See also – List of Jharkhand districts ranked by literacy rate

Literacy in CD Blocks of
Ranchi district
Ranchi Sadar subdivision
Burmu – 64.54%
Khelari – 74.83%
Kanke – 73.75%
Ormanjhi – 67.53%
Silli – 73.73%
Angara – 64.92%
Namkum – 73.72%
Ratu – 73.00%
Nagri – 71.59%
Mandar – 67.63%
Chanho – 66.81%
Bero – 67.49%
Itki – 73.58%
Lapung – 60.29%
Bundu subdivision
Rahe – 69.19%
Bundu – 66.38%
Sonahatu – 66.04%
Tamar – 62.76%
Source: 2011 Census: CD block Wise
Primary Census Abstract Data

=== Language and religion ===
Religions in Nagri CD block (2011)
Religion	Percent
Others*	37.10%
Hinduism	33.34%
Islam	20.07%
Christianity	9.08%
Other or not stated	0.41%
*mainly tribal religions like Sarna

Hindi is the official language in Jharkhand and Urdu has been declared as an additional official language.

Languages of Nagri CD block (2011)
1. Sadri (67.7%)
2. Urdu (11.7%)
3. Kurukh (9.12%)
4. Hindi (8.91%)
5. Mundari (1.43%)
6. Others (1.20%)

== Rural poverty ==
60–70% of the population of Ranchi district were in the BPL category in 2004–2005. In 2011–12, the proportion of BPL population in Ranchi district came down to 27.82%. According to a study in 2013 (modified in 2019), "the incidence of poverty in Jharkhand is estimated at 46%, but 60% of the scheduled castes and scheduled tribes are still below poverty line."

== Economy ==
=== Livelihood ===
Livelihood
in Nagri CD block
1. Cultivators (29.2%)
2. Agricultural labourers (27.2%)
3. Household industries (1.93%)
4. Other Workers (41.7%)

In Nagri CD block in 2011, amongst the class of total workers, cultivators numbered 8,273 and formed 29.16%, agricultural labourers numbered 7,708 and formed 27.17%, household industry workers numbered 548 and formed 1.93% and other workers numbered 11,838 and formed 41.73%. Total workers numbered 28,367 and formed 37.11% of the total population, and non-workers numbered 48,075 and formed 62.89% of the population.

=== Infrastructure ===
There are 44 inhabited villages in Nagri CD block. In 2011, 20 villages had power supply. 13 villages had tap water (treated/ untreated), 44 villages had well water (covered/ uncovered), 44 villages had hand pumps, and all villages have drinking water facility. 10 villages had post offices, 6 villages had sub post offices, 5 villages had telephones (land lines), 17 villages had mobile phone coverage. 41 villages had pucca (paved) village roads, 9 villages had bus service (public/ private), 15 villages had autos/ modified autos, 27 villages had tractors. 4 villages had bank branches, 3 villages had agricultural credit societies. 3 villages had public distribution system, 44 villages had assembly polling stations.

=== Agriculture ===
In Ranchi district, 23% of the total area is covered with forests. "With the gradual deforestation of the district, more and more land is being brought under cultivation." Terraced low lands are called don and the uplands are called tanr. The hill streams remain almost dry, except in the rainy season, and does not offer much scope for irrigation.

In Nagri CD block, 47.36% of the total area was cultivable, in 2011. Out of this, 22.48% was irrigated land.

=== Backward Regions Grant Fund ===
Ranchi district is listed as a backward region and receives financial support from the Backward Regions Grant Fund. The fund, created by the Government of India, is designed to redress regional imbalances in development. As of 2012, 272 districts across the country were listed under this scheme. The list includes 21 districts of Jharkhand.

== Transport ==
There are railway stations at Argora and Piska on the Ranchi-Tori line.

National Highway 43 (earlier NH 23) (Ranchi-Gumla-Simdega-Rourkela), an important roadway in Ranchi district, passes through Nagri block.

== Education ==
Nagri CD block had 6 villages with pre-primary schools, 37 villages with primary schools, 22 villages with middle schools, 7 villages with secondary schools, 4 villages with senior secondary schools, 2 villages with special schools for disabled, 7 villages with no educational facility.
.*Senior secondary schools are also known as Inter colleges in Jharkhand

== Healthcare ==
Nagri CD block had 2 villages with primary health centres, 14 villages with primary health subcentres, 7 villages with maternity and child welfare centres, 4 villages with family welfare centres, 8 villages with medicine shops.
.*Private medical practitioners, alternative medicine etc. not included
