= Dakra, Ranchi =

Dakra
- Populated location
- Location in Jharkhand, India Dakra (India)
- Coordinates: 23.6618°N 85.0168°E
- Country: India
- State: Jharkhand
- District: Ranchi

Government
  - Type: Federal democracy

Languages (*For language details see Khelari block#Language and religion)
  - Official: Hindi, Urdu
- Time zone: UTC+5:30 (IST)
- PIN: 829210
- Telephone/ STD code: 06530
- Vehicle registration: JH 01
- Lok Sabha constituency: Ranchi
- Vidhan Sabha constituency: Kanke
- Website: ranchi.nic.in

Dakra is an inhabited location not identified in 2011 census as a separate place in the Khelari CD block in the Ranchi Sadar subdivision of the Ranchi district in the Indian state of Jharkhand.

== Geography ==
Cities, towns and locations in Ranchi district in South Chotanagpur Division
M: municipality, CT: census town, R: rural/ urban centre, N: neighbourhood, T: tourist centre, D: dam, H: historical/ religious centre
Owing to space constraints in the small map, the actual locations in a larger map may vary slightly

=== Location ===
Dakra is located at 23.6618°N 85.0168°E

According to Google maps Dakra Post Office is located between Churi and Khelari census towns.

=== Area overview ===
The map alongside shows a part of the Ranchi plateau, most of it at an average elevation of 2,140 feet above sea level. Only a small part in the north-eastern part of the district is the lower Ranchi plateau, spread over Silli, Rahe, Sonahatu and Tamar CD blocks, at an elevation of 500 to 1,000 feet above sea level. There is a 16 km long ridge south-west of Ranchi. There are isolated hills in the central plateau. The principal river of the district, the Subarnarekha, originates near Ratu, flows in an easterly direction and descends from the plateau, with a drop of about 300 feet at Hundru Falls. Subarnarekha and other important rivers are marked on the map. The forested area is shaded in the map. A major part of the North Karanpura Area and some fringe areas of the Piparwar Area of the Central Coalfields Limited, both located in the North Karanpura Coalfield, are in Ranchi district. There has been extensive industrial activity in Ranchi district, since independence. Ranchi district is the first in the state in terms of population. 8.83% of the total population of the state lives in this district - 56.9% is rural population and 43.1% is urban population.

Note: The map alongside presents some of the notable locations in the district. All places marked in the map are linked in the larger full screen map.

== Economy ==
The projects of the North Karanpura Area of Central Coalfields Limited are: Churi underground, Dakra Bukbuka opencast, K.D.H. opencast, Karkatta opencast, Rohini opencast, Purnadih opencast. The Area office is at Dakra.

== Education ==
Uttari Karnpura Shramik Mahavidyalaya was established at Dakra in 1990. Affiliated with Ranchi University, it offers courses in arts and commerce.

== Healthcare ==
Central Hospital of Central Coalfields Ltd. at Dakra with 50 beds has 11 general duty medical officers and 1 specialist. Among the facilities are: X‐Ray, ECG, Semi auto analyzer, monitor defibrillator, dental chair. It has 2 ambulances.
