= Ranchi Sadar subdivision =

- Subdivision
- Location in Jharkhand, India Ranchi Sadar subdivision (India)
- Coordinates: 23.36°N 85.33°E
- Country: India
- State: Jharkhand
- District: Ranchi
- Headquarters: Ranchi

Government
  - Type: Federalism in India

Languages
  - Official: Hindi, Urdu
- Time zone: IST
- Website: ranchi.nic.in

Ranchi Sadar subdivision is an administrative subdivision in the Ranchi district of the South Chotanagpur division in the state of Jharkhand, India.

== Overview ==
Ranchi district is a part of the Ranchi plateau, most of it at an average elevation of 2,140 feet above sea level. Only a small portion in the north-eastern part of the district is the lower Ranchi plateau, spread over Silli, Rahe, Sonahatu and Tamar CD blocks, at an elevation of 500 to 1,000 feet above sea level. There is a 16 km long ridge south-west of Ranchi. There are isolated hills in the central plateau.

== Administrative divisions ==
Cities, towns and locations in Ranchi district in South Chotanagpur Division
M: municipality, CT: census town, R: rural/ urban centre, N: neighbourhood, T: tourist centre, D: dam, H: Historical/ religious centre
Owing to space constraints in the small map, the actual locations in a larger map may vary slightly

Ranchi district is divided into two sub-divisions:Ranchi Sadar subdivision and Bundu subdivision.Ranchi Sadar subdivision consists of 14 CD blocks: Kanke, Ratu, Chanho, Mandar, Lapung, Burmu, Bero, Namkum, Ormanjhi, Angara, Silli, Khelari, Nagri and Itki. Bundu subdivision consists of 4 CD blocks: Rahe, Bundu, Sonahatu and Tamar. The details of the CD blocks are given below for the respective subdivision.

There are two statutory towns in the district - Ranchi is a municipal corporation housing the headquarters of Ranchi Sadar subdivision, and Bundu is a nagar panchayat, housing the headquarters of Bundu subdivision. There are thirteen census towns in Ranchi district, all are in Ranchi Sadar subdivision: Bisrampur, Churi, Ray, Khelari, Kanke, Arsande, Ibra, Muri, Tati, Ara, Bargarwa, Ratu and Tundul.

== Police stations ==
The following police stations are located in Ranchi Sadar subdivision: Argora, Bariatu, Chutia, Daily Market, Gonda, Hindpiri, Jagannathpur, Kotwali, Lalpur, Lower Bazar, Pundag, Sadar, SC/ ST, Sukdeonagar, Airport and Khelgaon (all in/ around Ranchi city). Angara, Bero, Burmu, Chanho, Itki, Kanke, Khelari, Lapung, Mandar, Nagri, Namkum, Narkopi, Pithoria, Ratu, Sikidiri, Silli, Tatisilwai (all in the CD blocks). There is a police outpost at Muri.

== Blocks ==
Community development blocks in Ranchi Sadar subdivision are:

CD Block	Headquarters	Area km^{2}	Population (2011)	SC %	ST %	Literacy rate %	CT
Angara	Angara	38.56	112,759	7.85	55.05	64.92	-
Bero	Bero	290.70	113,090	1.97	61.86	67.49	-
Burmu	Burmu	319.67	89,889	7.83	39.21	64.54	-
Chanho	Chanho	272.80	107,503	2.02	53.59	73.00	-
Itki	Itki	96.86	50,058	1.36	48.43	73.58	-
Kanke	Kanke	347.11	244,072	3.84	33.30	73.75	Kanke, Arsande
Khelari	Khelari	131.38	78,219	18.50	19.85	74.83	Bishrampur, Churi, Ray, Khelari
Lapung	Lapung	300.88	63,053	3.72	74.22	60.29	-
Mandar	Mandar	238.24	128,585	1.28	50.99	67.63	-
Nagri	Nagri	121.93	76,442	2.77	50.14	71.59	Tundul
Namkum	Namkum	415.61	145,841	5.14	59.98	73.72	Tati, Ara, Bargarwa
Ormanjhi	Ormanjhi	227.97	94,137	4.22	35.84	67.53	Irba
Ratu	Ratu	104.47	76,565	3.41	45.29	73.00	Ranchi
Silli	Silli	289.54	113,798	5.76	24.86	73.73	Muri

== Education ==
=== Educational institutions ===
The following institutions are located in Ranchi Sadar subdivision:

- Ranchi University was established in 1960 as a teaching-cum-affiliating university at Ranchi.
- Central Institute of Psychiatry was established at Kanke in 1918.
- Indian Institute of Natural Resins and Gums (formerly Indian Lac Research Institute), under ICAR, was established in 1924 at Namkum.
- Birla Institute of Technology was established in 1955 at Mesra.
- National Institute of Foundry and Forge Technology (renamed National Institute of Advanced Manufacturing Technology) was established in 1966 at Hatia.
- Jharkhand University of Technology was established in 2015 at Namkum.
- Birsa Agricultural University was established in 1981 at Kanke.
- Dr. Shyama Prasad Mukherjee University was established at Ranchi in 2017.
- National University of Study and Research in Law was established in 2010 at Ranchi.
- Jharkhand Raksha Shakti University was established in 2015 at Ranchi.
- Central University of Jharkhand was established at Ranchi in 2009.
- Rajendra Institute of Medical Sciences was established in 2002 at Ranchi.
- Ranchi Institute of Neuropsychiatry and Allied Sciences was established in 1998 at Ranchi.
- St. Xavier's College, Ranchi was established in 1958 at Ranchi.
- Gossner College was established in 1971 at Ranchi.
- Yogoda Satsanga Mahavidyalaya was established in 1971 at Ranchi.
- Maulana Azad College was established in 1960 at Ranchi.
- Nirmala College, Ranchi was established in 1969 at Ranchi.
- Sanjay Gandhi Memorial College was established in 1980 at Ranchi.
- St. Paul's College, Ranchi was established in 1980 at Ranchi.
- Kartik Oraon College at Ratu.
- Uttari Karnpura Shramik Mahavidyalaya was established at Dakra in 1990.
- Silli College was established in 1980 at Silli.

Nursing Colleges

- Florence College of Nursing was established at Irba in 2003–04.
- Shine – Abdur Razzaque Ansari Institute of Health Education & Research was established in 2009 at Irba.
- Amrita College of Nursing was established at Hutup, PO Irba.
- Kingpin College of Nursing was established in 2019 at Angara.
- St. Barnabas Hospital College of Nursing was established in 2015 at Ranchi.

B.Ed. Colleges

- Government Teachers Training College was established in 1955 at Ranchi.
- Shaswat Institute of Teacher's Education was established at Hutup, PO Irba.
- Sanghamitra Teacher Training College, was established at Chutupalu.
- J.D. National B.Ed. College was established at Janum, PO Angara.
- Jaipuria B Ed College was established at Bisa, PO Getalsud, Angara, in 2012.
- Cambridge Institute of Teachers Education was established at Baheya, PO Angara.
- Shaheed Sheikh Bhikari College of Education at Sutiyambe, Pithuriya, was established in 2012.

(Information about degree colleges with proper reference may be added here)

== Healthcare ==
=== Medical facilities ===
The following medical facilities are available in Ranchi Sadar subdivision:

- Rajendra Institute of Medical Sciences was established in 2002 at Ranchi.
- Central Institute of Psychiatry was established at Ranchi in 1918.
- Abdur Razzaque Ansari Memorial Weavers Hospital (Apollo Hospital Group) was established in 1996 at Irba.
- Itki TB Sanatorium at Itki is proposed to be converted to a multi-speciality hospital.

(Anybody having referenced information about location of government/ private medical facilities may please add it here)
