= Ormanjhi block =

Ormanjhi
- Community development block
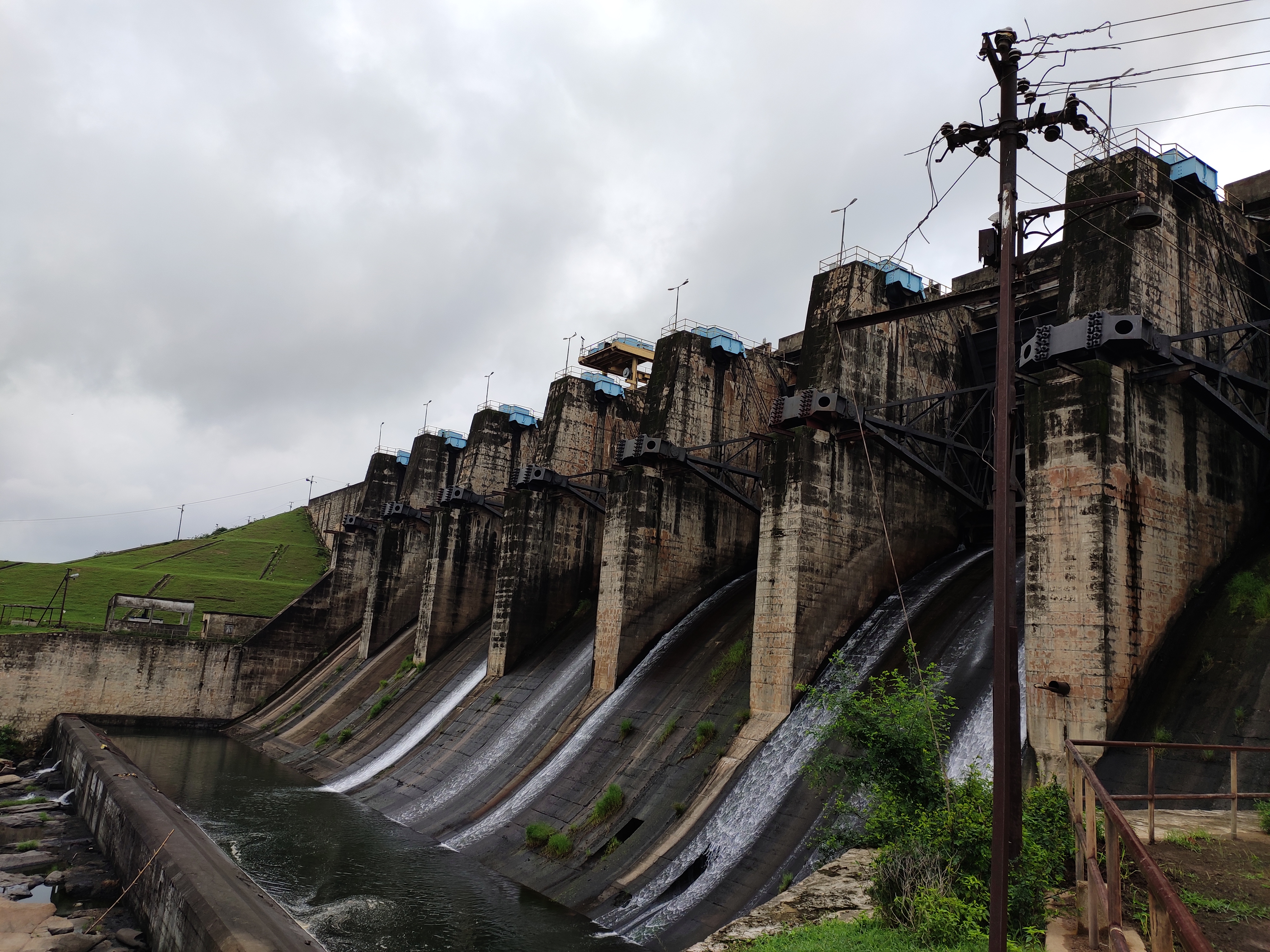
- Getalsud Dam

- Coordinates: 23°29′0″N 85°29′0″E
- Country: India
- State: Jharkhand
- District: Ranchi

Government
  - Type: Federal democracy

Area
  - Total: 227.97 km^{2} (88.02 sq mi)

Population (2011)
  - Total: 94,137
  - Density: 412.94/km^{2} (1,069.5/sq mi)

Languages
  - Official: Hindi, Urdu
- Time zone: UTC+5:30 (IST)
- PIN: 829210
- Telephone/STD code: 06530
- Vehicle registration: JH 1
- Literacy: 67.53%
- Lok Sabha constituency: Ranchi
- Vidhan Sabha constituency: Ranchi
- Website: ranchi.nic.in

Ormanjhi block is one of the administrative CD blocks in the Ranchi Sadar subdivision of Ranchi district in the Indian state of Jharkhand.

== Geography ==
Ormanjhi is located at 23°29′0″N 85°29′0″E.

Ormanjhi CD block is located on the Ranchi plateau proper. It has an average elevation of 2,140 feet (650 m) above mean sea level and the land is undulating.

Getalsud Dam across the Subarnarekha is in Ormanjhi block.

Ormanjhi CD block is bounded by the Patratu and Ramgarh CD blocks in Ramgarh district on the north, Angara CD block on the east, Kanke CD block on the south and on the west.

Ormanjhi CD block has an area of 227.97 km^{2}. Ormanjhi and Sikidiri police stations serve Ormanjhi CD block. The headquarters of Ormanjhi CD block is located at Ormanjhi village.

== Demographics ==
=== Population ===
According to the 2011 Census of India, Ormanjhi CD block had a total population of 94,137, of which 88,927 were rural and 5,210 were urban. There were 48,416 (51%) males and 45,721 (49%) females. Population in the age range 0–6 years was 14,448. Scheduled Castes numbered 3,974 (4.22%) and Scheduled Tribes numbered 33,734 (35.84%).

The percentage of Scheduled Tribes in Ranchi district, in 2011, was 47.67% of the population (rural) in the blocks. The percentage of Scheduled Tribes, numbering 1,042,016, in the total population of Ranchi district numbering 2,914,253 in 2011, was 35.76%. The Oraons forming 18.20% of the population and the Mundas forming 10.30% of the population, were the main tribes. Other tribes included (percentage of population in brackets) Lohra (2.46), Bedia (1.32) and Mahli (1.09).

The only census town in Ormanjhi CD block is (2011 population figure in brackets): Irba (5,210).

Large villages (with 4,000+ population) in Ormanjhi CD block are (2011 census figures in brackets): Ormanjhi (3,956).

=== Literacy ===
As of 2011 census, the total number of literate persons in Ormanjhi CD block was 53,812 (67.53% of the population over 6 years) out of which males numbered 32,061 (78.17% of the male population over 6 years) and females numbered 21,751 (56.24% of the female population over 6 years). The gender disparity (the difference between female and male literacy rates) was 21.93%.

As of 2011 census, literacy in Ranchi district was 77.13%. Literacy in Jharkhand was 67.63% in 2011. Literacy in India in 2011 was 74.04%.

See also – List of Jharkhand districts ranked by literacy rate

Literacy in CD Blocks of
Ranchi district
Ranchi Sadar subdivision
Burmu – 64.54%
Khelari – 74.83%
Kanke – 73.75%
Ormanjhi – 67.53%
Silli – 73.73%
Angara – 64.92%
Namkum – 73.72%
Ratu – 73.00%
Nagri – 71.59%
Mandar – 67.63%
Chanho – 66.81%
Bero – 67.49%
Itki – 73.58%
Lapung – 60.29%
Bundu subdivision
Rahe – 69.19%
Bundu – 66.38%
Sonahatu – 66.04%
Tamar – 62.76%
Source: 2011 Census: CD block Wise
Primary Census Abstract Data

=== Language and religion ===
Religions in Ormanjhi CD block (2011)
Religion	Percent
Hinduism	53.04%
Others*	25.08%
Islam	21.23%
Christianity	0.49%
Other or not stated	0.16%
*mainly tribal religions like Sarna

Hindi is the official language in Jharkhand and Urdu has been declared as an additional official language.

Languages of Ormanjhi block (2011)
1. Sadri (73.8%)
2. Khortha (8.96%)
3. Urdu (8.17%)
4. Hindi (5.12%)
5. Mundari (1.52%)
6. Others (2.44%)

== Rural poverty ==
60-70% of the population of Ranchi district were in the BPL category in 2004–2005. In 2011-12, the proportion of BPL population in Ranchi district came down to 27.82%. According to a study in 2013 (modified in 2019), "the incidence of poverty in Jharkhand is estimated at 46%, but 60% of the scheduled castes and scheduled tribes are still below poverty line."

== Economy ==
=== Livelihood ===
Livelihood
in Ormanjhi CD block
1. Cultivators (32.9%)
2. Agricultural labourers (18.3%)
3. Household industries (3.10%)
4. Other Workers (45.7%)

In Ormanjhi CD block in 2011, amongst the class of total workers, cultivators numbered 12,166 and formed 32.90%, agricultural labourers numbered 6,769 and formed 18.31%, household industry workers numbered 1,147 and formed 3.10% and other workers numbered 16,896 and formed 45.69%. Total workers numbered 36,978 and formed 39.28% of the total population, and non-workers numbered 57,159 and formed 60.72% of the population.

=== Infrastructure ===
There are 87 inhabited villages in Ormanjhi CD block. In 2011, 17 villages had power supply. 4 villages had tap water (treated/ untreated), 61 villages had well water (covered/ uncovered), 61 villages had hand pumps, and 3 villages have no drinking water facility. 13 villages had post offices, 10 villages had sub post offices, 15 villages had telephones (land lines), 71 villages had mobile phone coverage. 74 villages had pucca (paved) village roads, 14 villages had bus service (public/ private), 22 villages had autos/ modified autos, 9 villages had taxi/vans, 20 villages had tractors. 7 villages had bank branches, 7 villages had agricultural credit societies, 2 villages had public library and public reading rooms. 3 villages had public distribution system, 76 villages had assembly polling stations.

=== Agriculture ===
In Ranchi district, 23% of the total area is covered with forests. "With the gradual deforestation of the district, more and more land is being brought under cultivation." Terraced low lands are called don and the uplands are called tanr. The hill streams remain almost dry, except in the rainy season, and does not offer much scope for irrigation.

In Ormanjhi CD block, 31.96% of the total area was cultivable, in 2011. Out of this, 9.90% was irrigated land.

=== Backward Regions Grant Fund ===
Ranchi district is listed as a backward region and receives financial support from the Backward Regions Grant Fund. The fund, created by the Government of India, is designed to redress regional imbalances in development. As of 2012, 272 districts across the country were listed under this scheme. The list includes 21 districts of Jharkhand.

== Transport ==
National Highway 20 (earlier NH 33) (Ranchi-Ramgarh-Hazaribagh Road), an important roadway in Ranchi district, passes through Ormanjhi.

== Education ==
Ormanjhi CD block had 12 villages with pre-primary schools, 73 villages with primary schools, 35 villages with middle schools, 8 villages with secondary schools, 11 villages with senior secondary schools, 2 villages with polytechnics, 2 villages with non-formal education centres, 12 villages with no educational facility.
.*Senior secondary schools are also known as Inter colleges in Jharkhand

== Healthcare ==
Ormanjhi CD block had 5 villages with primary health centres, 17 villages with primary health subcentres, 5 villages with maternity and child welfare centres, 5 villages with allopathic hospitals, 3 villages with dispensaries, 1 village with veterinary hospital, 6 villages with medicine shops.
.*Private medical practitioners, alternative medicine etc. not included
