= Itki block =

Itki
- Community development block
- Coordinates: 23.3568°N 85.1226°E
- Country: India
- State: Jharkhand
- District: Ranchi

Government
  - Type: Federal democracy

Area
  - Total: 96.86 km^{2} (37.40 sq mi)

Population (2011)
  - Total: 50,058
  - Density: 516.8/km^{2} (1,339/sq mi)

Languages
  - Official: Hindi, Urdu
- Time zone: UTC+5:30 (IST)
- PIN: 835301
- Telephone/STD code: 06529
- Literacy: 73.58%
- Lok Sabha constituency: Ranchi
- Vidhan Sabha constituency: Hatia
- Website: ranchi.nic.in

Itki is a community development block (CD block) that forms an administrative division in the Ranchi Sadar subdivision of the Ranchi district, Jharkhand state, India.

== Maoist activities, dissent ==
Jharkhand is one of the states affected by Maoist activities. As of 2012, Ranchi district was among the highly affected districts in the state. “Areas of Tamar, Bundu, Sonahatu, Angarha, Sikidari Police Stations and Rahe O.P. have been widely affected by activities of CPI (Maoist) group till the end of year 2009. At the end of year 2010, The activities of CPI (Maoist) group has been minimized up to almost zero level.”

According to the Jharkhand Police spokesperson and inspector general (IG) Saket Singh, as reported on December 8, 2020, “The activities of CPI-Maoist are now confined to small pockets in the state because of our efforts.” Civilian fatalities, a key index of security in a region, declined from 20 in 2019, to 8 in 2020, the lowest in this category since 2000, when there were 13 such fatalities. The 28 total fatalities recorded in 2020 are also the lowest overall fatalities recorded in the state in a year since 2000, when they stood at 36.

Ranchi being the capital city of the state has always been under minute scrutiny of all. The arrest, from his home in Ranchi on October 9, 2020, by the NIA, of 83-years old Stan Swamy, Jesuit priest and activist, working with tribals for decades, and his subsequent death in custody, in a Mumbai hospital, on 5 July 2021, has been widely discussed.

== Geography ==
Itki is located at 23.3568°N 85.1226°E.

Itki CD block is located on the Ranchi plateau proper. It has an average elevation of 2,140 feet (650 m) above mean sea level and the land is undulating.

Itki CD block is bounded by the Mandar and Ratu CD blocks on the north, Nagri CD block on the east, Karra CD block in Khunti district on the south and Bero CD block on the west.

Itki CD block has an area of 96.86 km^{2}.Itki police station serves Itki CD block. The headquarters of Itki CD block is located at Itki village.

== Demographics ==
=== Population ===
According to the 2011 Census of India, Itki CD block had a total population of 50,058, all of which were rural. There were 25,234 (50%) males and 24,824 (50%) females. Population in the age range 0–6 years was 7,119. Scheduled Castes numbered 680 (1.36%) and Scheduled Tribes numbered 24,241 (48.43%).

The percentage of Scheduled Tribes in Ranchi district, in 2011, was 47.67% of the population (rural) in the blocks. The percentage of Scheduled Tribes, numbering 1,042,016, in the total population of Ranchi district numbering 2,914,253 in 2011, was 35.76%. The Oraons forming 18.20% of the population and the Mundas forming 10.30% of the population, were the main tribes. Other tribes included (percentage of population in brackets) Lohra (2.46), Bedia (1.32) and Mahli (1.09).

Large villages (with 4,000+ population) Itki CD block are (2011 census figures in brackets): Garhagaon (4,380) and Itkithakurgaon (12,174).

=== Literacy ===
As of 2011 census, the total number of literate persons in Itki CD block was 31,593 (73.58% of the population over 6 years) out of which males numbered 17,724 (81.95% of the male population over 6 years) and females numbered 13,868 (65.08% of the female population over 6 years). The gender disparity (the difference between female and male literacy rates) was 16.87%.

As of 2011 census, literacy in Ranchi district was 77.13%. Literacy in Jharkhand was 67.63% in 2011. Literacy in India in 2011 was 74.04%.

See also – List of Jharkhand districts ranked by literacy rate

Literacy in CD Blocks of
Ranchi district
Ranchi Sadar subdivision
Burmu – 64.54%
Khelari – 74.83%
Kanke – 73.75%
Ormanjhi – 67.53%
Silli – 73.73%
Angara – 64.92%
Namkum – 73.72%
Ratu – 73.00%
Nagri – 71.59%
Mandar – 67.63%
Chanho – 66.81%
Bero – 67.49%
Itki – 73.58%
Lapung – 60.29%
Bundu subdivision
Rahe – 69.19%
Bundu – 66.38%
Sonahatu – 66.04%
Tamar – 62.76%
Source: 2011 Census: CD block Wise
Primary Census Abstract Data

=== Language and religion ===
Religions in Itki CD block (2011)
Religion	Percent
Others*	37.15%
Islam	31.77%
Hinduism	21.69%
Christianity	8.50%
Other or not stated	0.89%
*mainly tribal religions like Sarna

Hindi is the official language in Jharkhand and Urdu has been declared as an additional official language.

Languages of Itki CD block (2011)
1. Sadri (37.3%)
2. Kurukh (26.4%)
3. Urdu (21.6%)
4. Hindi (13.8%)
5. Others (0.94%)

== Rural poverty ==
60-70% of the population of Ranchi district were in the BPL category in 2004–2005. In 2011–12, the proportion of BPL population in Ranchi district came down to 27.82%. According to a study in 2013 (modified in 2019), "the incidence of poverty in Jharkhand is estimated at 46%, but 60% of the scheduled castes and scheduled tribes are still below poverty line."

== Economy ==
=== Livelihood ===
Livelihood
in Itki CD block
1. Cultivators (43.4%)
2. Agricultural labourers (26.9%)
3. Household industries (3.17%)
4. Other Workers (26.5%)

In Itki CD block in 2011, amongst the class of total workers, cultivators numbered 9.077 and formed 43.39%, agricultural labourers numbered 5,629 and formed 26.91%, household industry workers numbered 663 and formed 3.17% and other workers numbered 5,551 and formed 26.53%. Total workers numbered 20,920 and formed 41.79% of the total population, and non-workers numbered 29,138 and formed 58.21% of the population.

=== Infrastructure ===
There are 30 inhabited villages in Itki CD block. In 2011, 13 villages had power supply. 2 villages had tap water (treated/ untreated), 30 villages had well water (covered/ uncovered), 30 villages had hand pumps, and all villages have drinking water facility. 5 villages had post offices, 5 villages had sub post offices, 3 villages had telephones (land lines), 18 villages had mobile phone coverage. 26 villages had pucca (paved) village roads, 7 villages had bus service (public/ private), 8 villages had autos/ modified autos, 6 villages had taxi/vans, 11 villages had tractors. 3 villages had bank branches. 12 villages had public distribution system, 22 villages had assembly polling stations.

=== Agriculture ===
In Ranchi district, 23% of the total area is covered with forests. “With the gradual deforestation of the district, more and more land is being brought under cultivation.” Terraced low lands are called don and the uplands are called tanr. The hill streams remain almost dry, except in the rainy season, and does not offer much scope for irrigation.

In Itki CD block, 44.14% of the total area was cultivable, in 2011. Out of this, 9.76% was irrigated land.

=== Backward Regions Grant Fund ===
Ranchi district is listed as a backward region and receives financial support from the Backward Regions Grant Fund. The fund, created by the Government of India, is designed to redress regional imbalances in development. As of 2012, 272 districts across the country were listed under this scheme. The list includes 21 districts of Jharkhand.

== Transport ==
There is a railway station at Itki on the Ranchi-Tori line.

== Education ==
Itki CD block had 6 villages with pre-primary schools, 29 villages with primary schools, 11 villages with middle schools, 6 villages with secondary schools, 2 villages with senior secondary schools, 1 villages with no educational facility.
.*Senior secondary schools are also known as Inter colleges in Jharkhand

== Healthcare ==
Itki CD block had 1 village with primary health centre, 4 villages with primary health subcentres, 1 village with maternity and child welfare centres, 2 villages with family welfare centres, 21 villages with medicine shops.
.*Private medical practitioners, alternative medicine etc. not included
