= Kanke block =

Kanke
- Community development block
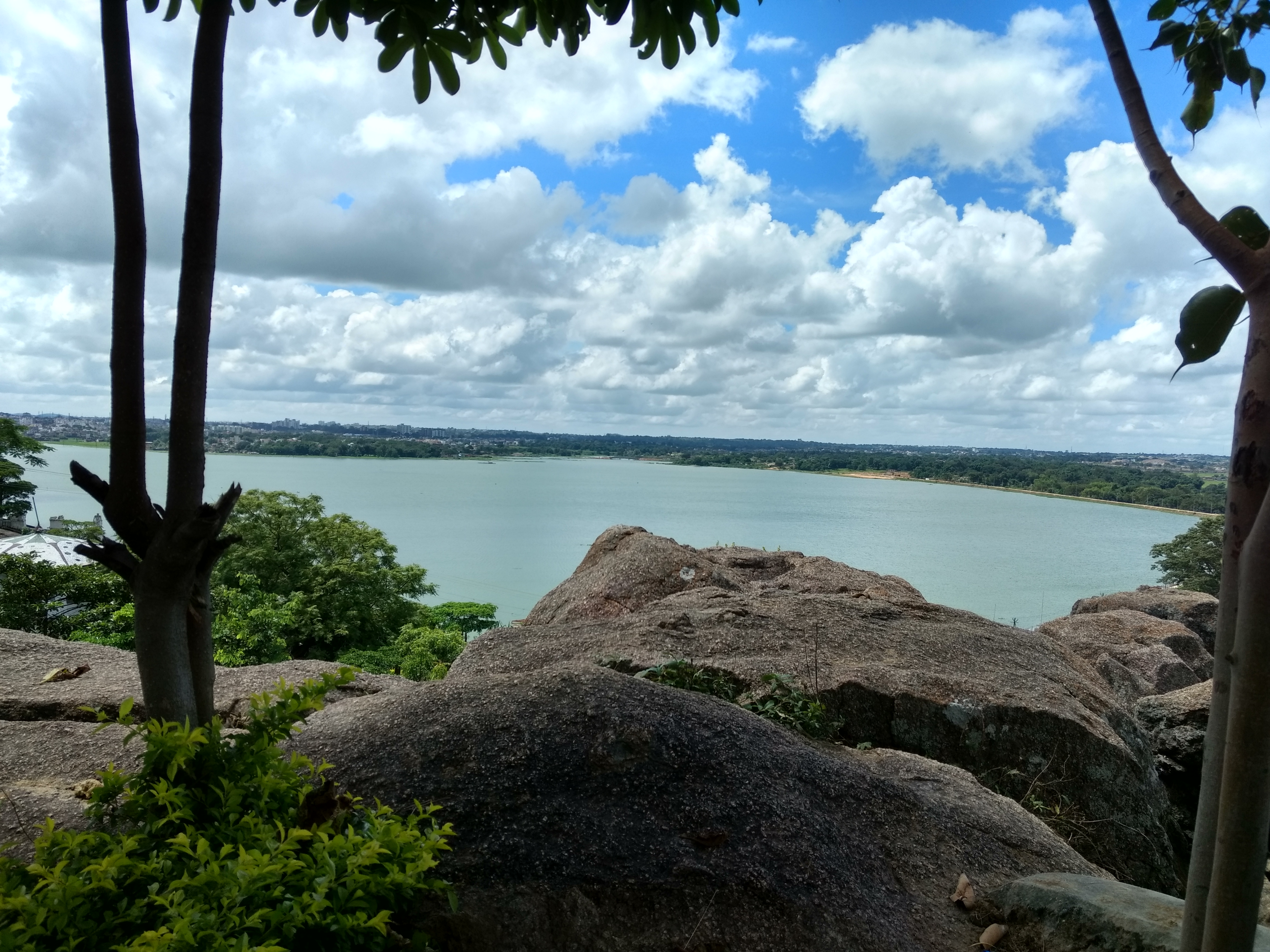
- Kanke Reservoir

- Coordinates: 23.43°N 85.32°E
- Country: India
- State: Jharkhand
- District: Ranchi

Government
  - Type: Federal democracy

Area
  - Total: 347.11 km^{2} (134.02 sq mi)

Population (2011)
  - Total: 244,072
  - Density: 703.15/km^{2} (1,821.2/sq mi)

Languages
  - Official: Hindi, Urdu
- Time zone: UTC+5:30 (IST)
- PIN: 834006
- Telephone/STD code: 0651
- Vehicle registration: JH 1
- Literacy: 73.75%
- Lok Sabha constituency: Ranchi
- Vidhan Sabha constituency: Kanke
- Website: ranchi.nic.in

Kanke block is a community development block in the Ranchi Sadar subdivision of Ranchi district, Jharkhand, India.

== Geography ==
Kanke is located at 23.43°N 85.32°E'

Kanke CD block is located on the Ranchi plateau proper. It has an average elevation of 2,140 feet (650 m) above mean sea level and the land is undulating.

Kanke CD block is bounded by the Patratu CD block of Ramgarh district on the north, Ormanjhi and Angara CD blocks on the east, Namkum and Nagri CD blocks on the south, and Ratu and Burmu CD blocks on the west.

Kanke CD block has an area of 347.11 km^{2}.Kanke and Pithoria police stations serve Kanke CD block. The headquarters of Kanke CD block is located at Kanke town.

== Demographics ==
=== Population ===
According to the 2011 Census of India, Kanke CD block had a total population of 244,072, of which 216,930 were rural and 27,142 were urban. There were 125,932 (52%) males and 118,140 (48%) females. Population in the age range 0–6 years was 36,181. Scheduled Castes numbered 9,364 (3.84%) and Scheduled Tribes numbered 8,1280 (33.30%).

The percentage of Scheduled Tribes in Ranchi district, in 2011, was 47.67% of the population (rural) in the blocks. The percentage of Scheduled Tribes, numbering 1,042,016, in the total population of Ranchi district numbering 2,914,253 in 2011, was 35.76%. The Oraons forming 18.20% of the population and the Mundas forming 10.30% of the population, were the main tribes. Other tribes included (percentage of population in brackets) Lohra (2.46), Bedia (1.32) and Mahli (1.09).

Census towns in Kanke CD block are as follows (2011 population figure in brackets): Kanke (17,560) and Arsande (9,582).

Large villages (with 4,000+ population) in Kanke CD block are (2011 census figures in brackets): Pithuriya (6,550), Katamkuli (5,903), Ichapiri (4,241), Neuri (6,907), Simliya (6,523), Kamre (6,114), Sukurhuttu (11, 862), Hosir (6,242), Mesra (9,476), Dumardaga (7,100) and Boreya (4,151).

=== Literacy ===
As of 2011 census, the total number of literate persons in Kanke CD block was 153,317 (73.75% of the population over 6 years) out of which males numbered 89,226 (83.06% of the male population over 6 years) and females numbered 64,091 (63.79% of the female population over 6 years). The gender disparity (the difference between female and male literacy rates) was 19.27%.

As of 2011 census, literacy in Ranchi district was 77.13%. Literacy in Jharkhand was 67.63% in 2011. Literacy in India in 2011 was 74.04%.

See also – List of Jharkhand districts ranked by literacy rate

Literacy in CD Blocks of
Ranchi district
Ranchi Sadar subdivision
Burmu – 64.54%
Khelari – 74.83%
Kanke – 73.75%
Ormanjhi – 67.53%
Silli – 73.73%
Angara – 64.92%
Namkum – 73.72%
Ratu – 73.00%
Nagri – 71.59%
Mandar – 67.63%
Chanho – 66.81%
Bero – 67.49%
Itki – 73.58%
Lapung – 60.29%
Bundu subdivision
Rahe – 69.19%
Bundu – 66.38%
Sonahatu – 66.04%
Tamar – 62.76%
Source: 2011 Census: CD block Wise
Primary Census Abstract Data

=== Language and religion ===
Religions in Kanke CD block (2011)
Religion	Percent
Hinduism	61.21%
Islam	17.68%
Others*	12.59%
Christianity	7.58%
Other or not stated	0.94%
*mainly tribal religions like Sarna

Hindi is the official language in Jharkhand and Urdu has been declared as an additional official language. Sadri is the predominant local language.

Languages in Kanke CD block (2011)
1. Hindi (50.2%)
2. Sadri (18.6%)
3. Urdu (12.5%)
4. Bhojpuri (3.90%)
5. Bengali (2.99%)
6. Kurukh (2.65%)
7. Mundari (2.12%)
8. Magahi (1.98%)
9. Maithili (1.35%)
10. Others (3.78%)

== Rural poverty ==
60-70% of the population of Ranchi district were in the BPL category in 2004–2005. In 2011-12, the proportion of BPL population in Ranchi district came down to 27.82%. According to a study in 2013 (modified in 2019), "the incidence of poverty in Jharkhand is estimated at 46%, but 60% of the scheduled castes and scheduled tribes are still below poverty line."

== Economy ==
=== Livelihood ===
Livelihood
in Kanke CD block
1. Cultivators (5.88%)
2. Agricultural labourers (6.96%)
3. Household industries (3.55%)
4. Other Workers (83.6%)

In Kanke CD block in 2011, amongst the class of total workers, cultivators numbered 24,757 and formed 5.88%, agricultural labourers numbered 29,267 and formed 6.96%, household industry workers numbered 14,934 and formed 3.55% and other workers numbered 351,732 and formed 83.61%. Total workers numbered 420,690 and formed 31.93% of the total population, and non-workers numbered 896,809 and formed 68.07% of the population.

=== Infrastructure ===
There are 103 inhabited villages in Kanke CD block. In 2011, 84 villages had power supply. 10 villages had tap water (treated/ untreated), 67 villages had well water (covered/ uncovered), 67 villages had hand pumps, and 8 villages did not have drinking water facility. 22 villages had post offices, 16 villages had sub post offices, 21 villages had telephones (land lines), 49 villages had mobile phone coverage. 74 villages had pucca (paved) village roads, 14 villages had bus service (public/ private), 22 villages had autos/ modified autos, 9 villages had taxi/vans, 20 villages had tractors. 8 villages had bank branches, 6 villages had agricultural credit societies, 5 villages had public library and public reading rooms. 6 villages had public distribution system, 90 villages had assembly polling stations.

=== Agriculture ===
In Ranchi district, 23% of the total area is covered with forests. "With the gradual deforestation of the district, more and more land is being brought under cultivation." Terraced low lands are called don and the uplands are called tanr. The hill streams remain almost dry, except in the rainy season, and does not offer much scope for irrigation.

In Kanke CD block, 32.99% of the total area was cultivable, in 2011. Out of this, 12.29% was irrigated land.

=== Backward Regions Grant Fund ===
Ranchi district is listed as a backward region and receives financial support from the Backward Regions Grant Fund. The fund, created by the Government of India, is designed to redress regional imbalances in development. As of 2012, 272 districts across the country were listed under this scheme. The list includes 21 districts of Jharkhand.

== Transport ==
The Koderma–Hazaribagh–Barkakana–Ranchi line passes through Kanke block with a station at Mesra and halt stations at Hundur and Jhajhitoli. The Barkakana-Koderma sector is in operation and, as of 2021, the Ranchi-Barkakana sector is partially operable and is nearing completion.

== Education ==
Kanke CD block had 14 villages with pre-primary schools, 89 villages with primary schools, 44 villages with middle schools, 16 villages with secondary schools, 7 villages with senior secondary schools, 3 villages with general degree colleges, 1 village with engineering college, 1 village with polytechnic, 2 villages with vocational training schools/ ITIs, 1 village with non-formal training centre, 1 village with special school for disabled, 14 villages with no educational facilities.
.*Senior secondary schools are also known as Inter colleges in Jharkhand

Birla Institute of Technology, established in 1955 by the industrialist B.M.Birla at Mesra, is a deemed university, it offers graduate, post graduate and Ph D programmes.

Jawahar Navodaya Vidyalaya is an English-medium coeducational institution established at Mesra in 1988. It is a senior secondary school following the Central Board of Secondary Education pattern.

== Healthcare ==
Kanke CD block had 5 villages with primary health centres, 24 villages with primary health subcentres, 9 villages with maternity and child welfare centres, 2 villages with allopathic hospitals, 3 villages with dispensaries, 1 village with veterinary hospital, 17 villages with medicine shops.
.*Private medical practitioners, alternative medicine etc. not included
