= Barkakana–Son Nagar line =

Railway line in India

Barkakana–Son Nagar line (including Ranchi–Tori line and Garhwa Road–Billi line)
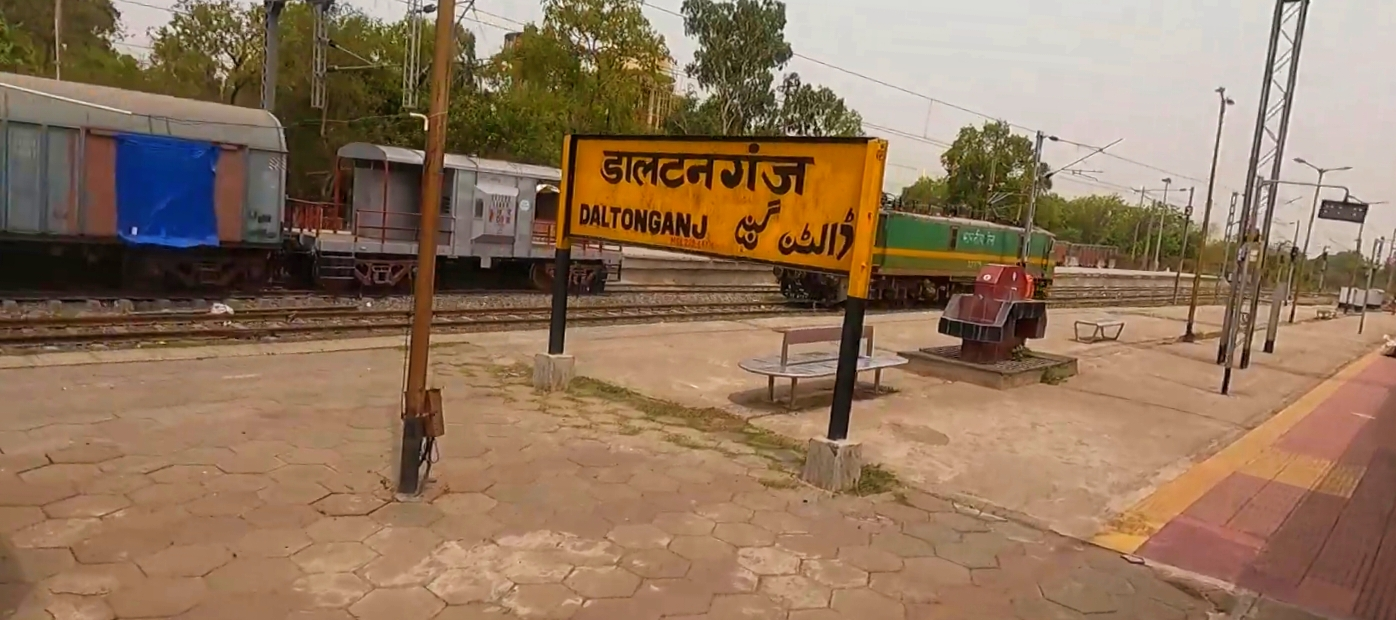
- Daltonganj railway station is an important Railway Station on Barkakana–Son Nagar line

Overview
- Status: Operational
- Owner: Indian Railways
- Locale: Bihar, Jharkhand
- Termini: Barkakana; Son Nagar
- Stations: 41

Service
- System: Electrified
- Operator: East Central Railway

History
- Opened: 1907

Technical
- Line length: 313 km (194 mi)
- Number of tracks: 2
- Track gauge: 5 ft 6 in (1,676 mm) broad gauge
- Electrification: electrified in 1962
- Operating speed: up to 110 km/h (68 mph)

The Barkakana–Son Nagar line is an Indian railway line connecting Barkakana and Son Nagar on the Gaya–Mughalsarai section of the Grand Chord. This 313-kilometre (194 mi) track is under the jurisdiction of East Central Railway.

== History ==
In 1902, a branch line of EIR was opened from Sone East Bank (later renamed Son Nagar) to Daltonganj. With the development of South Karanpura Coalfield, the Central India Coalfields Railway opened a line from Gomoh to Barkakana in 1927 and from Barkakana to Daltonganj in 1929. These lines were subsequently taken over by EIR.

== Bridging the Soane/Son ==
The total length of the Upper Soane Bridge across the Soane, as the river was then called, over abutments is 3,064 metres (10,052 ft). It was opened for traffic on 27 February 1900. When it was built, it was the longest bridge in India and was believed to be the second-longest bridge in the world, short of the Tay Bridge near Dundee. Subsequently, longer road bridges were built but it remained the longest rail bridge in India for many years. The opening of the 4.62 km Vembanad Rail Bridge, connecting the Container Transshipment Terminal on Vallarpadam Island to Edappally, in February 2011, pushed it to the second position.

== Freight corridor ==
Son Nagar is expected to be connected with Ludhiana as part of the Eastern Corridor. The primary feeder routes for this will be from Sonnagar to Durgapur via Gomoh, Sonnagar to Tatanagar via Garhwa Road, and Barkakana to Bokaro via Chandrapura.

== Railway reorganisation ==
In 1952, Eastern Railway, Northern Railway and North Eastern Railway were formed. Eastern Railway was formed with a portion of East Indian Railway Company, east of Mughalsarai and Bengal Nagpur Railway. Northern Railway was formed with a portion of East Indian Railway Company west of Mughalsarai, Jodhpur Railway, Bikaner Railway and Eastern Punjab Railway. North Eastern Railway was formed with Oudh and Tirhut Railway, Assam Railway and a portion of Bombay, Baroda and Central India Railway. East Central Railway was created in 1996–97.
