= Ratu, Ranchi =

Ratu
- Census Town
- Location in Jharkhand, India Ratu (India)
- Coordinates: 23.4204°N 85.2207°E
- Country: India
- State: Jharkhand
- District: Ranchi

Government
  - Type: Federal democracy

Area
  - Total: 8.85 km^{2} (3.42 sq mi)

Population (2011)
  - Total: 22,379
  - Density: 2,530/km^{2} (6,550/sq mi)

Languages (*For language details see Ratu block#Language and religion)
  - Official: Hindi, Urdu
- Time zone: UTC+5:30 (IST)
- PIN: 835222
- Telephone/ STD code: 06529
- Vehicle registration: JH 01
- Literacy: 81.88%
- Lok Sabha constituency: Ranchi
- Vidhan Sabha constituency: Hatia
- Website: ranchi.nic.in

Ratu is a census town in the Ratu CD block in the Ranchi Sadar subdivision of the Ranchi district in the Indian state of Jharkhand.

== History ==
In 1870, Nagvanshi king shifted their capital from Palkot to Ratu. King Udai Pratap Nath Shah Deo built Ratu Palace in 1901 CE. Ratu was the seat of the former Maharaja of Chotanagpur. Large fairs are held in the town on the occasion of Durga Puja and Rath Yatra.

== Geography ==
Cities, towns and locations in Ranchi district in South Chotanagpur Division
M: municipality, CT: census town, R: rural/ urban centre, N: neighbourhood, T: tourist centre, D: dam, H: historical/ religious centre
Owing to space constraints in the small map, the actual locations in a larger map may vary slightly

=== Location ===
Ratu is located at 23.4204°N 85.2207°E.

It is 13 km from Ranchi.

=== Area overview ===
The map alongside shows the Ranchi plateau, most of it at an average elevation of 2,140 feet above sea level. Only a small part in the north-eastern part of the district is the lower Ranchi plateau, spread over Silli, Rahe, Sonahatu and Tamar CD blocks, at an elevation of 500 to 1,000 feet above sea level. There is a 16 km long ridge south-west of Ranchi. There are isolated hills in the central plateau. The principal river of the district, the Subarnarekha, originates near Ratu, flows in an easterly direction and descends from the plateau, with a drop of about 300 feet at Hundru Falls. Subarnarekha and other important rivers are marked on the map. The forested area is shaded in the map. A major part of the North Karanpura Area and some fringe areas of the Piparwar Area of the Central Coalfields Limited, both located in the North Karanpura Coalfield, are in Ranchi district. There has been extensive industrial activity in Ranchi district, since independence. Ranchi district is the first in the state in terms of population. 8.83% of the total population of the state lives in this district - 56.9% is rural population and 43.1% is urban population.

Note: The map alongside presents some of the notable locations in the district. All places marked in the map are linked in the larger full screen map.

== Civic administration ==
=== Police station ===
There is a police station at Ratu.

=== CD block HQ ===
The headquarters of Ratu CD block are located at Ratu town.

== Demographics ==
According to the 2011 Census of India, Ratu had a total population of 22,379, of which 11,521 (51%) were males and 10,858 (49%) were females. Population in the age range 0–6 years was 2,863. The total number of literate persons in Ratu was 15,980 (81.88% of the population over 6 years).

== Infrastructure ==
According to the District Census Handbook 2011, Ranchi, Ratu covered an area of 8.85 km^{2}. Among the civic amenities, it had 33.5 km roads with both closed and open drains, the protected water supply involved uncovered well, hand pump. It had 3,863 domestic electric connections, 150 road lighting points. Among the medical facilities, it had 4 hospitals, 1 dispensary, 1 health centre, 1 family welfare centre, 1 maternity and child welfare centre, 1 maternity home, 10 medicine shops. Among the educational facilities it had 2 primary schools, 2 middle schools, 1 secondary school, 1 senior secondary school. It had 4 non-formal education centres (Sarva Shiksha Abhiyan). Among the social, recreational and cultural facilities it had 3 cinema theatres, 4 auditorium/ community halls. Three important commodities it produced were ball bearing, wood/ timber, oil mill products. It had the branch offices of 3 nationalised banks.

== Tourism ==
=== Ratu Palace ===
The Ratu Palace, belonging to the 2,000 years old Nagvanshi dynasty, was conceptualised by Maharaja Udai Pratap Shah Deo during 1899–1901. Designed after Buckingham Palace, it has 103 rooms and manicured gardens. The dynasty shifted its seat from Palkot to Ratu in 1870. Ratu has well maintained temples but Durga Puja is a great draw.

== Transport ==
National Highway 39 (Ranchi-Daltonganj), an important roadway in Ranchi district, passes through Ratu.

== Education ==
Kartik Oraon College (more popular as KO College) at Ratu is affiliated with Ranchi University and offers several courses in humanities, languages and commerce.

Chotanagpur Government High School is a Hindi-medium coeducational institution established in 1946. It has facilities for teaching from class IX to class XII. It has a play ground and a library with 214 books.

Presidency Public High School is an English-medium school established in 2010. It has facilities for teaching from class I to class X. It has a play ground and has 3 computers for teaching and learning purposes.

Prem Manjari High School is a Hindi-medium girls only institution established in 1982. It has facilities for teaching in classes IX and X. It has a playground, a library with 285 books and has 1 computer for teaching and learning purposes.

Samarpandeep B.Ed. College, established in 2010 at Ushamantu, PO Ratu. It is 16 km from Ranchi and offers a degree course in education.
