= Piparwar Area =

Coal mining area in Jharkhand, India

- Location in Jharkhand Piparwar Area (India)
- Location: North Karanpura Coalfield; 23.6911°N 85.0668°E
- Company: Central Coalfields Limited
- Website: centralcoalfields.in/cmpny/hstry.php

Piparwar Area is one of the operational areas of the Central Coalfields Limited located mainly in the Chatra district and marginally in the Ranchi district in the state of Jharkhand, India.

The projects of the Piparwar Area are: Piparwar opencast, Ray-Bachra underground, Ashoka opencast, Piparwar coal handling plant/ coal preparation plant. The Area office is at Piparwar, PO Bachra.

== Overview ==
Collieries in the North Karanpura Coalfield except the North Karanpura Area
U: Underground colliery, O: Open Cast colliery, A: Administrative headquarters, CT: census town, R: rural/urban centre
Location of new mine sites are approximate
Owing to space constraints in the small map, the actual locations in a larger map may vary slightly

North Karanpura Coalfield has reserves of 14 billion tonnes of coal (proved, indicated and inferred), around 9% of India's total coal reserves, placing it amongst the biggest coalfields in India. Only a small corner of this coalfield was exploited earlier. On the southern side of the Damodar River, there are some long established coal mines – Karkatta, KD Hesalong, Manki, Churi, Bachara and Dakara. Some of these coal mines are part of the North Karanpura Area of Central Coalfields. On the northern side of the Damodar River, the first mine to be undertaken was the prestigious Piparwar mine. This was followed by the contiguous Ashoka mine and subsequently many others. The entire area is buzzing with activity. However, there is a note of caution: “Throughout the coalfields, it is important to remember that the majority of the population are indigenous people, Oraons, Mundas and Karamalis amongst the STs, Mahatos, Yadavs and Teli Saos among the BCs, and Bhuiyas, Ganjhus, Turis, Paswans and Chamars among the SCs. This means that those to be affected are almost totally of the weakest section of Indian society.”

Future mega projects in the area include: Magadh opencast project expansion with nominal capacity of 51 million tonnes per year and peak capacity of 70 million tonnes per year, Amrapali OCP expansion with nominal capacity of 25 MTY and peak capacity of 35 MTY, Sanghamitra OCP with nominal capacity of 20 MTY and peak capacity of 27 MTY, and Chandragupta OCP with nominal capacity of 15 MTY and peak capacity of 20 MTY.

== Mining activity ==
Cities, towns and locations in Chatra district in North Chotanagpur Division
M: municipality, CT: census town, R: rural/ urban centre, H: historical/ religious centre, P: power plant, T: tourist centre
Abbreviation used - TPS: thermal power station
Owing to space constraints in the small map, the actual locations in a larger map may vary slightly

=== Mines and projects ===
Piparwar open cast project was commissioned with Australian collaboration in the 1990s. In 2014, it was expanded from a normative capacity 10 million tonnes per annum to 12.50 MTPA and peak capacity from 11.5 MTPA to 14.375 MTPA. The total geological reserve was 244 million tonnes and mineable reserve was 48.80 million tonnes. The life of the mine was estimated to be 13 years from 2007. A railway siding at Piparwar was provided to avoid coal transportation by road. Ray railway station on the Barkakana-Son Nagar line is 10 km (6.2 mi) away.

CCL has installed solar plants on the roof of houses, in order to reduce day-time demand. In addition, they have planned to instal an 80 megawatt peak ground-mounted solar power plant at Piparwar.

Piparwar Mangardaha underground mine is a new mine that will work in the Piparwar and Mangardaha blocks of the Lower Bachra (bottom section) seam. A major portion of the mining area lies below Piparwar OCP. The area from where coal has been taken out is partly filled up by internal dumps. It is located in the North Karanpura Coalfield. Proposed production from the mine is 1.38 million tonnes per year.

Ashoka opencast project in the North Karanpura Coalfield in Chatra district commenced operations in 1995. In 2013–14, it produced 7.50 million tonnes of coal. The estimated mineable reserve in the Ashoka block was 121.66 MT as on 01.04.2014. Ashoka block is characterized by more or less flat terrain with gentle undulations. The highest and the lowest elevations in the Ashoka block are 480 metres (1,570 ft) and 420 metres (1,380 ft) (above mean sea level) respectively. In 2014, the production capacity was raised from 6.5 million tonnes per year to 10.00 million tonnes per year. Major efforts have been made by CCL for land restoration/ reclamation and afforestation.

The Washery, with a production capacity of 10 million tonnes per year, was 500 m from the mine.

Ray-Bachra underground project had a planned production capacity of 0.30 million tonnes per year. It is located in Chatra district.

== Educational facilities for employees’ children ==
Central Coalfields Limited provides support for reputed institutions/ trusts for setting up 10+2 pattern CBSE schools for children of CCL employees. It provides 109 buses to employees’ children to schools and back. Among the schools in the North Karanpura Coalfield that receive financial help or structural support is: DAV Bachra.

== Medical facilities ==
In the North Karanpura Coalfield, CCL has the following facilities:

Central Hospital at Dakra with 50 beds has 11 general duty medical officers and 1 specialist. Among the facilities are: X‐Ray, ECG, Semi auto analyzer, monitor defibrillator, dental chair. It has 2 ambulances.

Piparwar Hospital at Bachra with 11 beds has 6 general duty medical officers and 1 specialist. Among the facilities it has are: cardiac monitor, suction machine, X-Ray machine and ECG. It has 4 ambulances.

There are central facilities in the Central Hospital, Gandhinagar at Kanke Road, Ranchi with 250 beds and in the Central Hospital, Naisarai at Ramgarh with 150 beds.

There are dispensaries at Rohini, KDH, Purnadih/ Karkatta in North Karanapura Area, at Amrapali Project, Magadh Project in the Magadh Sanghamitra Area, at Tetariakhad in the Rajhara Area.
