= North Karanpura Area =

Indian coal mining region

- Location in Jharkhand North Karanpura Area (India)
- Location: North Karanpura Coalfield; 23.680°N 85.009°E
- Company: Central Coalfields Limited
- Website: centralcoalfields.in/cmpny/hstry.php

Collieries in the CCL North Karanpura Area (North Karanpura Coalfield)
U: Underground colliery, O: Open Cast colliery, W: Washery, A: Administrative headquarters, CT: census town
Owing to space constraints in the small map, the actual locations in a larger map may vary slightly

North Karanpura Area is one of the operational areas of the Central Coalfields Limited located in the Ranchi district in the state of Jharkhand, India.

The projects of the North Karanpura Area are: Churi underground, Dakra Bukbuka opencast, K.D.H. opencast, Karkatta opencast, Rohini opencast, Purnadih opencast. The Area office is at Dakra.

== Mining activity ==
=== Mines and projects ===
KDH (KD Hesalong) opencast project is an existing mine with a production capacity of 4.5 million tonnes per year. An extension project has been proposed in order to sustain the level of production from the existing KDH OCP and also to fulfill the demand of power grade coal from North Karanpura Coalfield. The KDH OCP falls within Hesalong and KD South blocks in the south central part of North Karanpura Coalfield in Ranchi district. It is 1 km from Khalari railway station on the Barkakana-Son Nagar line. The topography of Hesalong block is undulating and rolling with small ridges. The intervening valleys and low flat grounds are generally coincident with the outcrops of the coal seams. The altitude range is 418–466 metres (1,371–1,529 ft). As of 2014, it has a mineable reserve of 107.15 million tonnes and the life of the mine is estimated at 29 years.

Rohini OCP was started in 1992–93. It produced 0.731 million tonnes of coal in 2013–14. A comprehensive Environmental Management Plan (EMP) for this project (0.8 MTPA to 2.00 MTPA), was formulated by CMPDI. The mineable reserve is 15.979 million tonnes and the estimated life of the project is 10 years. Rohini OCP is located at Dakra in Ranchi district. It is situated west of Damodar River and north and north-west of the Karkatta OCP and K.D. Hesalong OCP.

== Private coal washery ==
Monnet Daniels has a 4.2 million tonnes per annum washery in the area (see map), which they have built for Punjab State Electricity Board.

== Educational facilities for employees’ children ==
Central Coalfields Limited provides support for reputed institutions/ trusts for setting up 10+2 pattern CBSE schools for children of CCL employees. It provides 109 buses to employees’ children to schools and back. Among the schools in the North Karanpura Coalfield that receive financial help or structural support is: DAV Bachra.

== Medical facilities ==
In the North Karanpura Coalfield, CCL has the following facilities:

Central Hospital at Dakra with 50 beds has 11 general duty medical officers and 1 specialist. Among the facilities are: X‐Ray, ECG, Semi auto analyzer, monitor defibrillator, dental chair. It has 2 ambulances.

Piparwar Hospital at Bachra with 11 beds has six general duty medical officers and one specialist. Among the facilities it has are: cardiac monitor, suction machine, X-Ray machine and ECG. It has four ambulances.

There are central facilities in the Central Hospital, Gandhinagar at Kanke Road, Ranchi with 250 beds and in the Central Hospital, Naisarai at Ramgarh with 150 beds.

There are dispensaries at Rohini, KDH, Purnadih/ Karkatta in North Karanapura Area, at Amrapali Project, Magadh Project in the Magadh Sanghamitra Area, at Tetariakhad in the Rajhara Area.

Cities, towns and locations in Ranchi district in South Chotanagpur Division
M: municipality, CT: census town, R: rural/ urban centre, N: neighbourhood, T: tourist centre, D: dam, H: historical/ religious centre
Owing to space constraints in the small map, the actual locations in a larger map may vary slightly
