= Hundru Falls =

Waterfall on the Subarnarekha River in Jharkhand, India

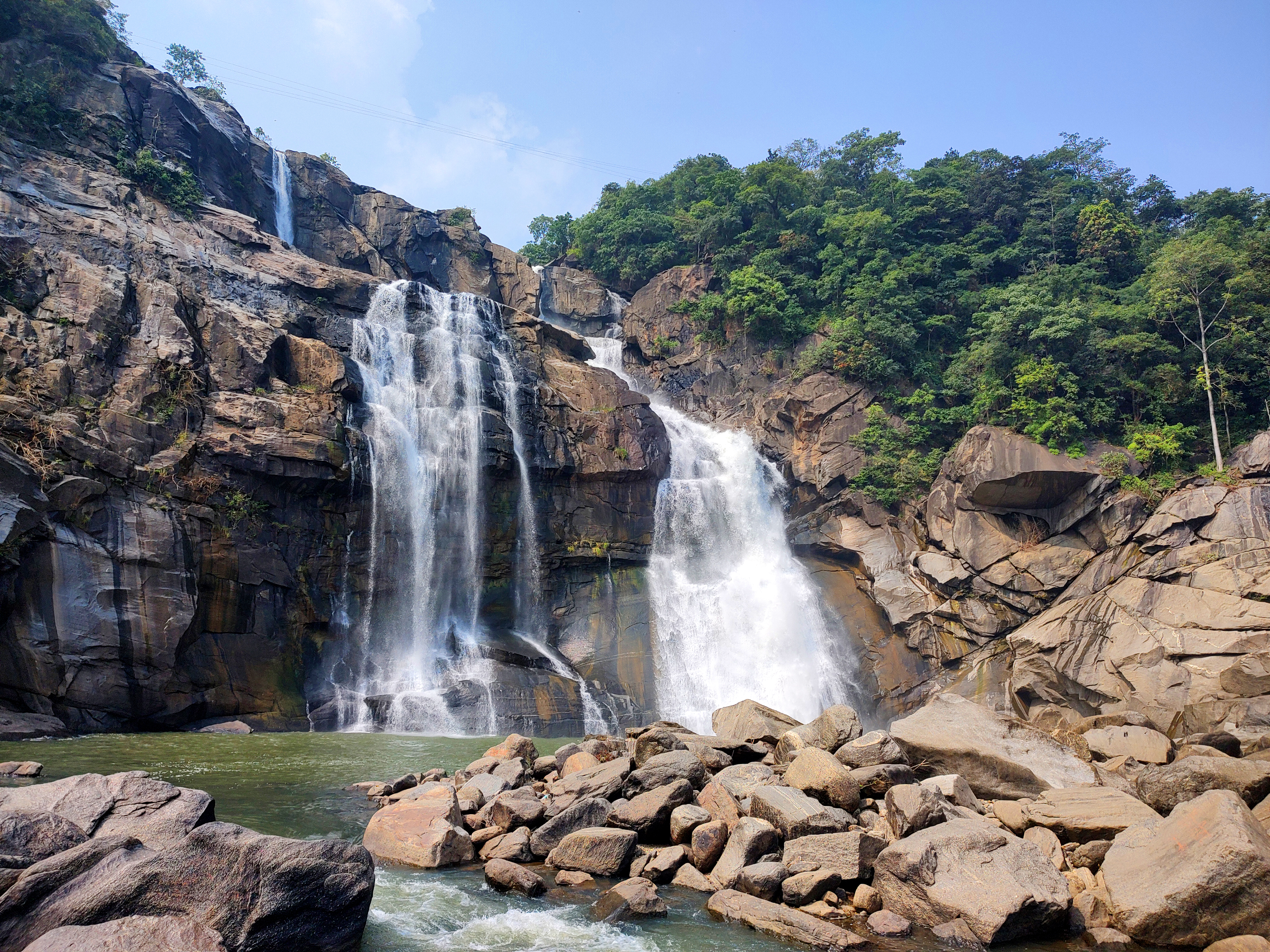
- Interactive map of Hundru Falls
- Location: Ranchi District, Jharkhand, India
- Coordinates: 23.4500°N 85.6500°E
- Type: Segmented
- Elevation: 456 metres (1,496 ft)
- Total height: 98 metres (322 ft)
- Watercourse: Subarnarekha River
- Cities, towns and locations in Ranchi District in South Chotanagpur Division; M: municipality, CT: census town, R: rural/ urban centre, N: neighbourhood, T: tourist centre, D: dam, H: historical/ religious centre Owing to space constraints in the small map, the actual locations in a larger map may vary slightly

Hundru Falls is a waterfall located in Ranchi District in the Indian state of Jharkhand. It is the 34th highest waterfall in India, and one of the most famous tourist places in the region.

== Geography ==
Hundru Falls are located on the course of the Subarnarekha River where it falls from a height of 98 metres (322 ft), creating one of the highest waterfalls in the state. The spectacular scene of the waterfalls has been described as "a sight to behold". The different formations of rock due to the erosion by the constantly falling of water have added to the beauty of the place.

Hundru Falls, located at one of the edges of the Ranchi plateau, is one of the several scarp falls in the region. During the rainy season it takes a formidable form, but in the dry season it turns into an exciting picnic spot. At the base of the falls is a pool that serves as a bathing place.

Hundru Falls is an example of a knickpoint, caused by rejuvenation. A knickpoint, also called a nick point or simply nick, represents a break in slopes in the longitudinal profile of a river. The break in channel gradient allows water to fall vertically, giving rise to a waterfall.

== Transport ==
To reach Hundru Falls, one has to travel about 21 kilometres (13 mi) from the main road, Purulia Road.

There is also a shortcut and simple four-lane road from Ranchi via Ormanjhi via Sikidiri to Hundru. From this road the distance is about 39 kilometres (24 mi) which is about 6 kilometres (3.7 mi) short from the normal road.

There is also a Suvarna Rekha Hydral Project located down the falls, which is a good place for tourists.

== See also ==
- List of waterfalls
- List of waterfalls in India
- List of waterfalls in India by height
- Ranchi travel guide from Wikivoyage
