= North Karanpura Coalfield =

Coalfield in Jharkhand, India

- Location in Jharkhand
- Location: Jharkhand, India; 23°43′41″N 85°30′22″E
- Company: Central Coalfields Limited
- Website: http://ccl.gov.in/
- Acquired: 1975

North Karanpura Coalfield is located in Ranchi, Hazaribagh, Chatra and Latehar districts in the Indian state of Jharkhand.

== Overview ==
In 1917, L.S.S.O’Malley described the coalfields in the upper reaches of the Damodar as follows: "Near the western boundary of Jharia field is that of Bokaro, covering" 220 square miles (570 km^{2}), "with an estimated content of 1,500 million tons; close by… is the Ramgarh field (40 square miles), in which, however, coal is believed to be of inferior quality. A still larger field in the same district is that called Karanpura, which extends over" 544 square miles (1,410 km^{2}) "and has an estimated capacity of 9,000 million tons."

== The Coalfield ==
There are large numbers of seams in the North Karanpura Coalfield, some with thicknesses over 72 feet.

North Karnpura Coalfield covers an area of 1,230 square kilometres (470 sq mi) and has total coal reserves of 13,110.84 million tonnes.

Collieries in the North Karanpura Coalfield except the North Karanpura Area
U: Underground colliery, O: Open Cast colliery, A: Administrative headquarters, CT: census town, R: rural/urban centre
Location of new mine sites are approximate
Owing to space constraints in the small map, the actual locations in a larger map may vary slightly
Collieries in the CCL North Karanpura Area (North Karanpura Coalfield)
U: Underground colliery, O: Open Cast colliery, W: Washery, A: Administrative headquarters, CT: census town
Owing to space constraints in the small map, the actual locations in a larger map may vary slightly

=== Reserves ===
Geological reserves in the North Karanpura Coalfield in million tonnes as on 1/4/2010:

Type of Coal	Proved	Indicated	Inferred (exploration)	Total
Medium coking coal	508.67	2799.84	413.43	3,721.24
Non-coking coal	8990.75	2,909.72	1,451.53	13,352.00
Total	9,499.42	5,708.86	1,864.96	17,073.24

=== Projects ===
CCL Operational Area	Projects
North Karanpura Area	Churi underground, Dakra Bukbuka opencast, K.D.H. opencast, Karkatta opencast, Rohini opencast, Purnadih opencast.
Piparwar Area	Piparwar opencast, Ray-Bachra underground, Ashoka opencast, Piparwar coal handling plant/ coal preparation plant.
Magadh Sanghamitra Area	Magadh open cast project, Sanghamitra open cast project.
Amrapali & Chandragupta Area	Amrapali open cast project, Chandragupta open cast project.

== Transport ==
In 1927, Bengal Nagpur Railway opened the 72-mile (116 km) Barkakana-Muri-Chandil line to traffic. In the same year the Central India Coalfields Railway opened the Gomoh-Barkakana line. It was extended to Daltonganj in 1929. Later these lines were amalgamated with East India Railway. The 57 km long Hazaribagh-Barkakana section of the Koderma-Hazaribagh-Barkakana-Ranchi line was opened for passenger trains on 7 December 2016 by the railway minister Suresh Prabhu in the presence of chief minister Raghubar Das.

== Coal-bed methane ==
ONGC's preliminary assessment of coal-bed methane indicates that four Damodar Valley coalfields – Jharia, Bokaro, North Karanpura and Raniganj – to be the most prospective.

== See also ==
- South Karanpura Coalfield
