= National Highway 135B (India) =

National highway in India

National Highway 135B
- Map of National Highway 135B in red

Route information
- Auxiliary route of NH 35
- Length: 90 km (56 mi)

Major junctions
- North end: Mau
- South end: Rewa

Location
- Country: India
- States: Uttar Pradesh, Madhya Pradesh

Highway system
- Roads in India; Expressways; National; State; Asian
| ← NH 35 | → NH 39 |

National Highway 135B, commonly referred to as NH 135B is a national highway in India. It is a spur road of National Highway 35. NH-135B traverses the states of Uttar Pradesh and Madhya Pradesh in India.

== Route ==
Mau, Dabhoura, Sirmaur, Rewa.

== Junctions ==
NH 35 Terminal near Mau.
NH 135BD near Sirmaur.
NH 39 near Rewa.

== See also ==
- List of national highways in India
- List of national highways in India by state
