= National Highway 135BB (India) =

National Highway in India

National Highway 135BB
- Map of National Highway 135BB in red

Route information
- Auxiliary route of NH 35
- Length: 103 km (64 mi)

Major junctions
- East end: Bargarh More near Jamira
- West end: Rewa

Location
- Country: India
- States: Madhya Pradesh, Uttar Pradesh

Highway system
- Roads in India; Expressways; National; State; Asian
← NH 35	→ NH 39

National Highway 135BB, commonly referred to as NH 135BB is a national highway in India. It is a spur road of National Highway 35. NH-135BB traverses the states of Madhya Pradesh and Uttar Pradesh in India.

== Route ==
Uttar Pradesh

Bargarh More near Jamira - Bargarh - Gahur - M.P. border.

Madhya Pradesh

U.P. border - Dubi, Magdaur, Dabhoura, Bardaha Ghati, Sirmour, Rewa.

== Junctions ==
NH 35 Terminal near Jamira.
NH 135BD Terminal near Dabhoura.
NH 39 Terminal near Rewa.

== See also ==
- List of national highways in India
- List of national highways in India by state
