= Ranchi–New Delhi Rajdhani Express =

Train in India

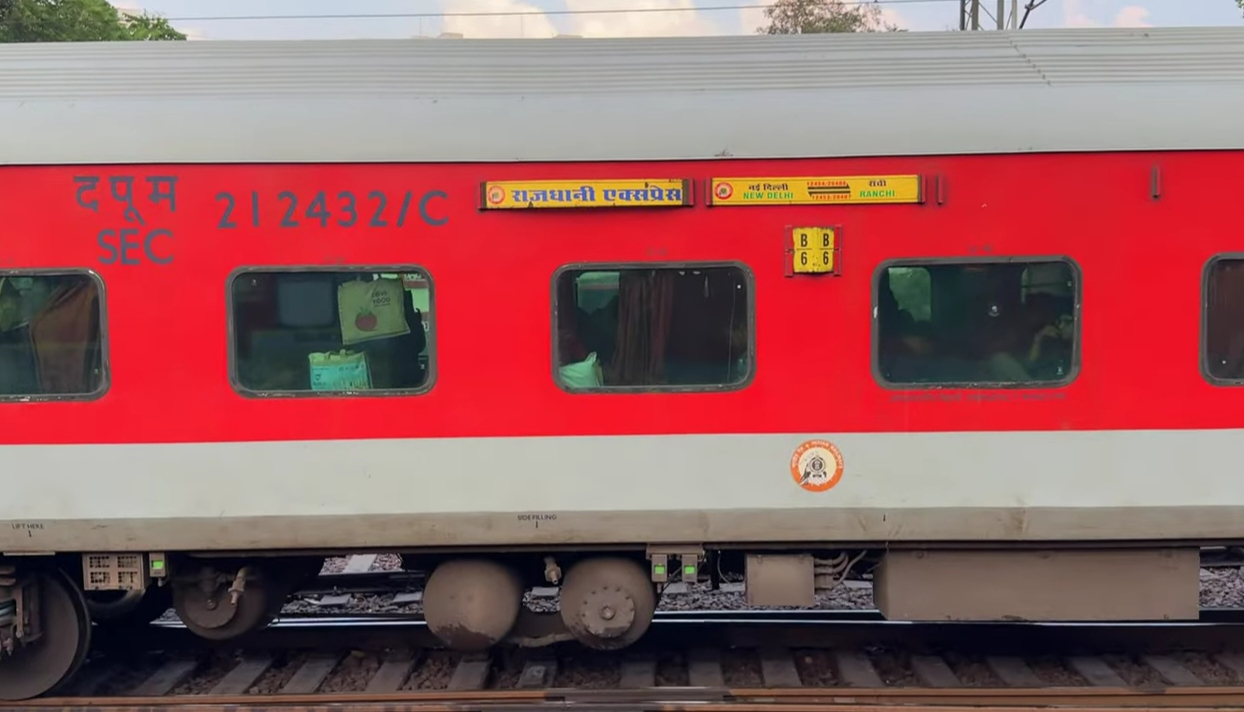
- Ranchi Rajdhani Express at Etawah Junction railway station

Overview
- Service type: Rajdhani Express
- Locale: Jharkhand, West Bengal, Bihar, Uttar Pradesh & New Delhi
- Current operators: Northern Railway (for 20407/20408 and 12453/12454); South Eastern Railway (for 20839/20840)

Route
- Termini: Ranchi Junction (RNC); New Delhi (NDLS)
- Stops: 7 as 20839/20840, 7 as 20407/20408, 10 as 12453/12454
- Distance travelled: 20839/20840 - 1,307 km (812 mi), 20407/20408 - 1,251 km (777 mi), 12453/12454 - 1,244 km (773 mi)
- Average journey time: 20839/20840 16 Hrs 55 Mins, 20407/20408 16 Hrs, 12453/12454 17 Hrs 55 Mins
- Train numbers: 20839/20840, 20407/20408, 12453/12454

On-board services
- Classes: AC First Class, AC 2 Tier, AC 3 Tier
- Catering facilities: On-board catering, E-catering

Technical
- Rolling stock: LHB coach
- Track gauge: 1,676 mm (5 ft 6 in)
- Operating speed: Average Speed (including halts); 20839/20840 (76 km/h), 20407/20408 (75 km/h), 12453/12454 (69 km/h)
Route map
(Via Bokaro Steel City)
↓ ( 20839 / 20840 ) ↓
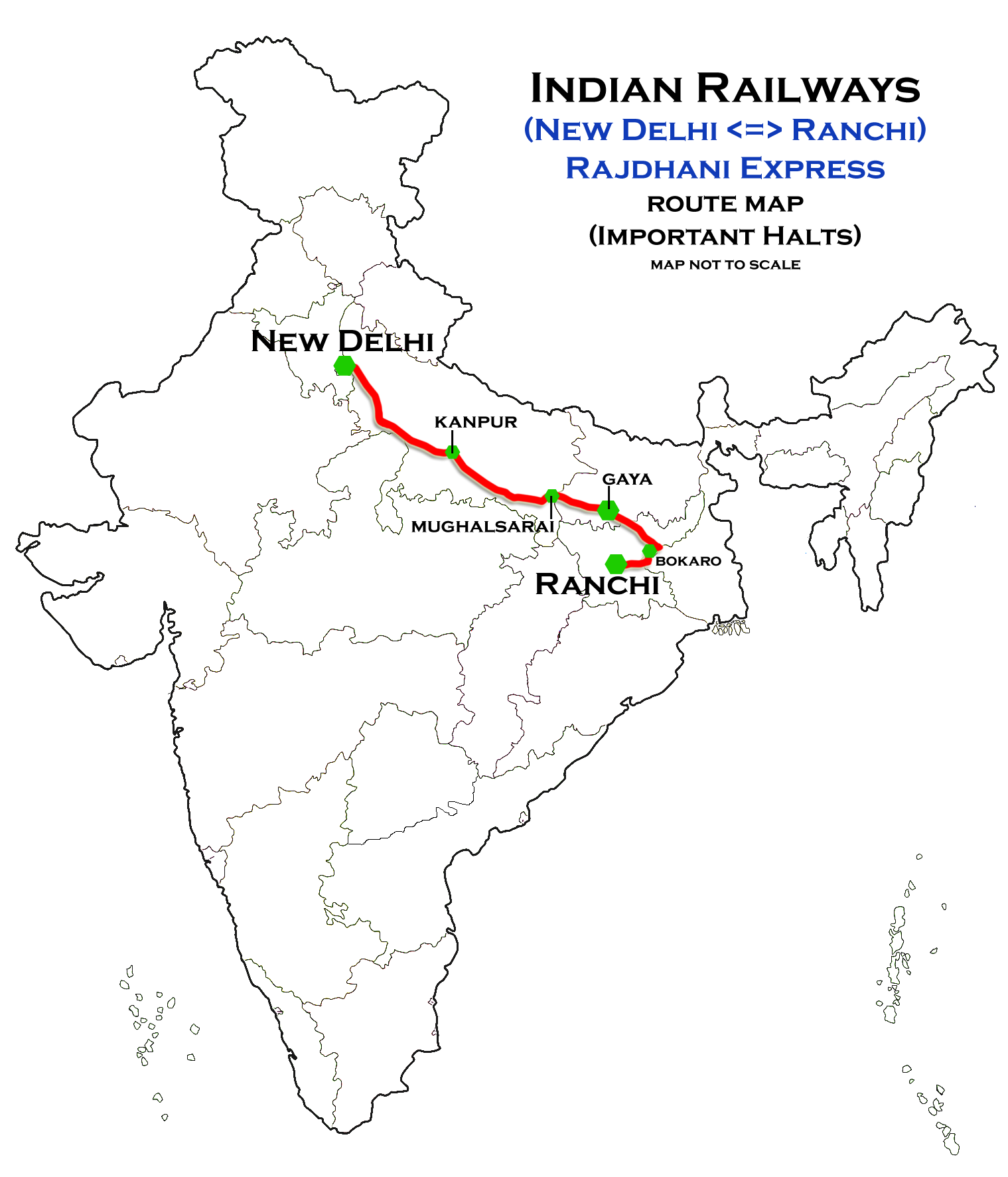

The Ranchi–New Delhi Rajdhani Express is a premium train in the exclusive fleet of Rajdhani Express of Indian Railways.

== History ==
- On 17 October 2001, Nitish Kumar, former Minister of Railways, inaugurated the train service as a weekly service through Bokaro Steel City with Hatia as the terminating station instead of present terminating station Ranchi. Later, in 2004 the frequency was increased to bi-weekly.
- On 11 June 2006, Lalu Prasad Yadav, former Minister of Railways, inaugurated the train service as a bi-weekly service through the Prayagraj - Mughalsarai - Daltonganj - Barkakana - Muri route. Later in 2021, after gauge conversion of Ranchi - Lohardaga rail line and construction of Lohardaga - Tori rail line the route was changed to Prayagraj - Mughalsarai - Daltonganj - Lohardaga - Tori - Ranchi. Further, the route for the train service on one of the two days of a week was changed to Prayagraj - Chunar - Chopan - Daltonganj - Lohardaga - Tori - Ranchi.

== Coach composition ==
Train Number	1	2	3	4	5	6	7	8	9	10	11	12	13	14	15	16	17	18	19	20	21	22
20839	LOCO	EOG	B11	B10	B9	B8	B7	B6	B5	B4	B3	B2	B1	PC	A6	A5	A4	A3	A2	A1	H1	EOG
20840	LOCO	EOG	H1	A1	A2	A3	A4	A5	A6	PC	B1	B2	B3	B4	B5	B6	B7	B8	B9	B10	B11	EOG

Train Number	1	2	3	4	5	6	7	8	9	10	11	12	13	14	15	16	17	18	19	20	21
20407	LOCO	EOG	B11	B10	B9	B8	B7	B6	B5	B4	B3	B2	B1	PC	A5	A4	A3	A2	A1	H1	EOG
20408	LOCO	EOG	H1	A1	A2	A3	A4	A5	PC	B1	B2	B3	B4	B5	B6	B7	B8	B9	B10	B11	EOG

Train Number	1	2	3	4	5	6	7	8	9	10	11	12	13	14	15	16	17	18	19	20	21
12453	LOCO	EOG	B11	B10	B9	B8	B7	B6	B5	B4	B3	B2	B1	PC	A5	A4	A3	A2	A1	H1	EOG
12454	LOCO	EOG	H1	A1	A2	A3	A4	A5	PC	B1	B2	B3	B4	B5	B6	B7	B8	B9	B10	B11	EOG

== Traction ==
The three sets of Ranchi Rajdhani Express is hauled by a WAP-7 (HOG)-equipped locomotive of Ghaziabad electric loco shed in both directions.Route& Halts

== Time table ==
Route 1 - via Chopan					Route 2 - via Japla					Route 3 - via Bokaro Steel City				
Train No. 12453		Stations	Train No. 12454		Train No. 20407		Stations	Train No. 20408		Train No. 20839		Stations	Train No. 20840	
Arrival	Departure	Stations	Arrival	Departure	Arrival	Departure	Stations	Arrival	Departure	Arrival	Departure	Stations	Arrival	Departure
---	17:15	Ranchi	09:45	---	---	18:25	Ranchi	08:10	---	---	18:10	Ranchi	09:05	---
20:39	20:41	Daltonganj	05:40	05:42	21:39	21:41	Daltonganj	04:41	04:43	20:05	20:10	Bokaro Steel City	06:30	06:35
21:20	21:25	Garhwa Road	05:00	05:05	22:50	22:55	Garhwa Road	04:10	04:15	22:01	22:03	Koderma	04:40	04:42
22:36	22:38	Renukut	03:20	03:22	01:35	01:45	Mughalsarai	01:12	01:22	23:20	23:23	Gaya	03:30	03:33
00:05	00:10	Chopan	02:45	02:50	01:35	01:45	Mughalsarai	01:12	01:22	00:16	00:18	Dehri-on-Sone	02:28	02:30
03:35	03:37	Prayagraj	22:58	23:00	03:35	03:37	Prayagraj	22:58	23:00	01:35	01:45	Mughalsarai	01:12	01:22
05:40	05:45	Kanpur Central	20:52	20:57	05:40	05:45	Kanpur Central	20:52	20:57	05:40	05:45	Kanpur Central	20:52	20:57
11:10	---	New Delhi	---	16:10	11:10	---	New Delhi	---	16:10	11:10	---	New Delhi	---	16:10

== Incidents ==
On 7 Sep 2017, the engine and power car of train derailed near New Delhi, but no casualties were reported.
