= NH 135 =

NH 135 may refer to:

- National Highway 135 (India)
- New Hampshire Route 135, United States
