= National Highway 135C (India) =

National Highway in India

National Highway 135C
- Map of National Highway 135C in red

Route information
- Auxiliary route of NH 35
- Length: 176 km (109 mi)

Major junctions
- North end: Allahabad (Prayagraj)
- South end: Waidhan

Location
- Country: India
- States: Uttar Pradesh, Madhya Pradesh

Highway system
- Roads in India; Expressways; National; State; Asian
← NH 35	→ NH 39

National Highway 135C, commonly referred to as NH 135C is a national highway in India. It is a secondary route of National Highway 35. NH-135C runs in the states of Uttar Pradesh and Madhya Pradesh in India.

== Route ==
NH135C connects Allahabad city in U.P. to Waidhan city in the state of Madhya Pradesh.

Uttar Pradesh

Allahabad (Prayagraj), Koraon, Drumondganj, Haliya, Adwa Dam, Pipra, Manigarha, Devri Bazar, Karondiya, - M.P. Border

Madhya Pradesh

U.P. Border - Bagdara, Chitrangi, Singrauli, Waidhan.

== Junctions ==
NH 35 Terminal near Allahabad(Prayagraj).
NH 135 near Drumanodganj
NH 39 Terminal near Waidhan.

== See also ==
- List of national highways in India
- List of national highways in India by state
