= Bilaspur Rajdhani Express =

Train in India

Bilaspur Junction - New Delhi Rajdhani Express
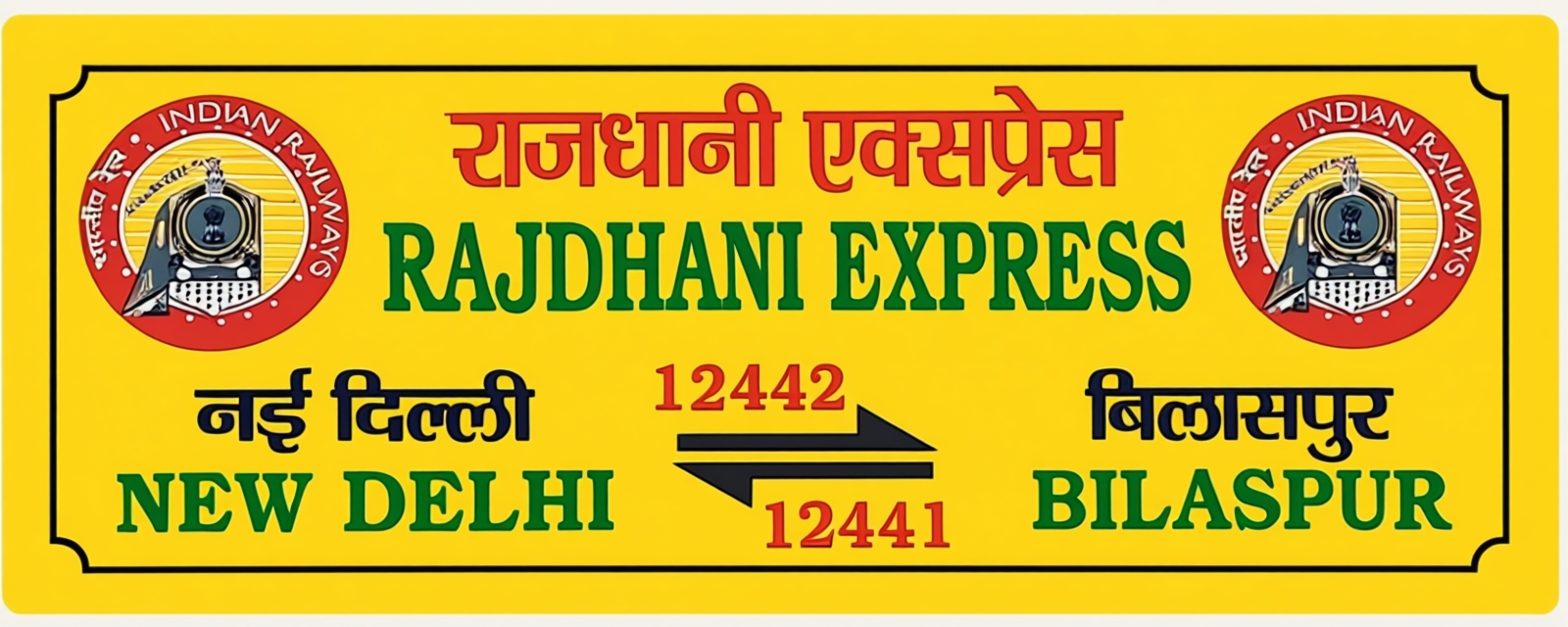

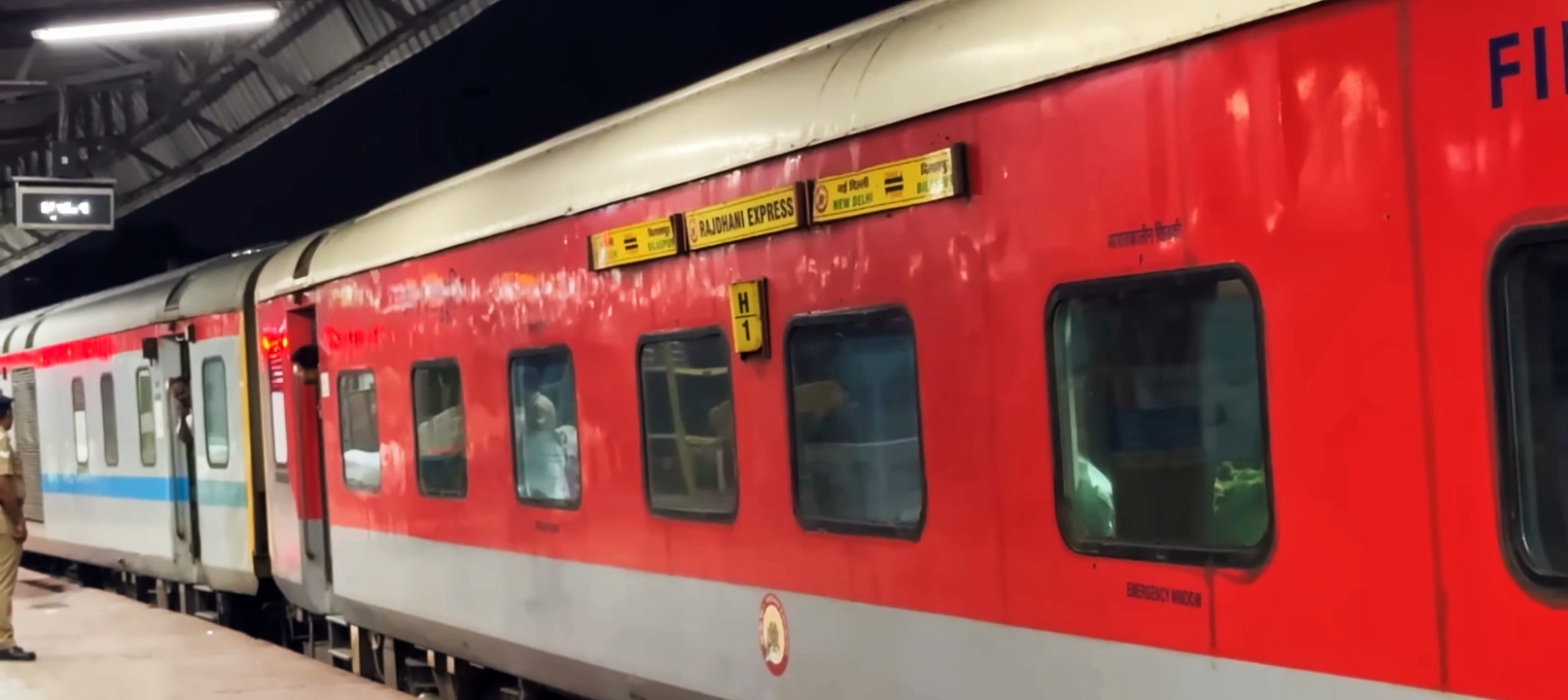
- Bilaspur Rajdhani Express At Itarsi Junction railway station

Overview
- Service type: Rajdhani Express
- First service: 28 October 2001; 24 years ago
- Current operator: Northern Railway

Route
- Termini: Bilaspur (BSP); New Delhi (NDLS)
- Stops: 8
- Distance travelled: 1,505 km (935 mi)
- Average journey time: 20 hours 40 minutes
- Service frequency: Bi-Weekly
- Train number: 12441 / 12442
- Lines used: Bilaspur–Nagpur section; Nagpur–Bhopal section; Bhopal–Agra section; Agra–New Delhi line

On-board services
- Classes: AC First Class, AC 2 tier, AC 3 tier
- Seating arrangements: No
- Sleeping arrangements: Yes
- Catering facilities: Available
- Observation facilities: Large windows
- Baggage facilities: Available

Technical
- Rolling stock: LHB coach
- Track gauge: 1,676 mm (5 ft 6 in)
- Operating speed: 130 km/h (81 mph) maximum, 73 km/h (45 mph) average including halts
Route map
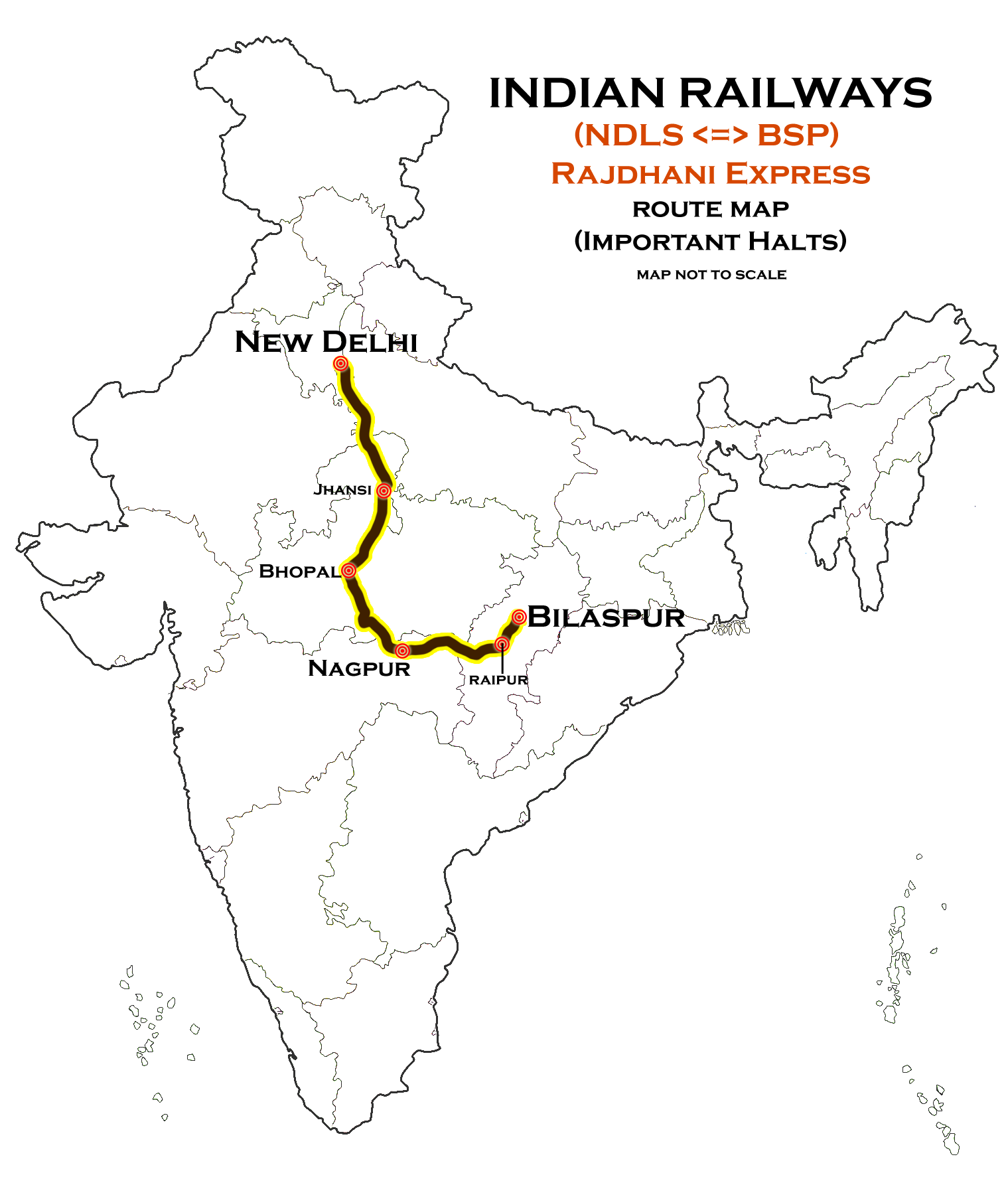
Bilaspur Rajdhani Express route map
↓ 12242 • 12241 ↑

The 12441 / 12442 Bilaspur-New Delhi Rajdhani Express is a Rajdhani Express train belonging to Indian Railways – Northern Railway zone that runs between Bilaspur Junction and New Delhi in India.

It operates as train number 12441 from Bilaspur Junction to New Delhi and as train number 12442 in the reverse direction, serving the states of Chhattisgarh, Maharashtra, Madhya Pradesh, Uttar Pradesh and Delhi. It is the fastest train on the Bilaspur - Delhi via Nagpur route. It is one of the Rajdhani's in the entire Indian Railway network to have a locomotive and rake reversal. The reversal for both the trains occurs at Nagpur Junction (NGP).

== Coaches ==
The 12441 / 42 Bilaspur–New Delhi Rajdhani Express presently has 1 AC 1st Class, 6 AC 2 tier, 10 AC 3 tier, a pantry car and 2 end-on generator coaches. As is customary with most train services in India, coach composition may be amended at the discretion of Indian Railways depending on demand.

It was the last Rajdhani class train to be equipped with LHB coaches, in 2016.

== Coach positioning ==
Coach positioning of 12442 Bilaspur Rajdhani at New Delhi station is:

LOCO-EOG-H1-H2-A1-A2-A3-A4-A5-PC-B1-B2-B3-B4-B5-B6-B7-B8-B9-B10-B11-B12-EOG

Coach Positioning is vice versa at Bilaspur Junction Railway Station.

== Service ==
Then northbound 12441 Bilaspur–New Delhi Rajdhani Express covers the distance of 1,501 kilometres (933 mi) in 20 hours 45 minutes (72.34 km/h (44.95 mph)); the southbound 12442 New Delhi–Bilaspur Rajdhani Express takes 20:15 (74.12 km/h (46.06 mph)).

Per Indian Railways rules, as the average speed of the train is above 55 km/h (34 mph), its fare includes a Superfast surcharge.

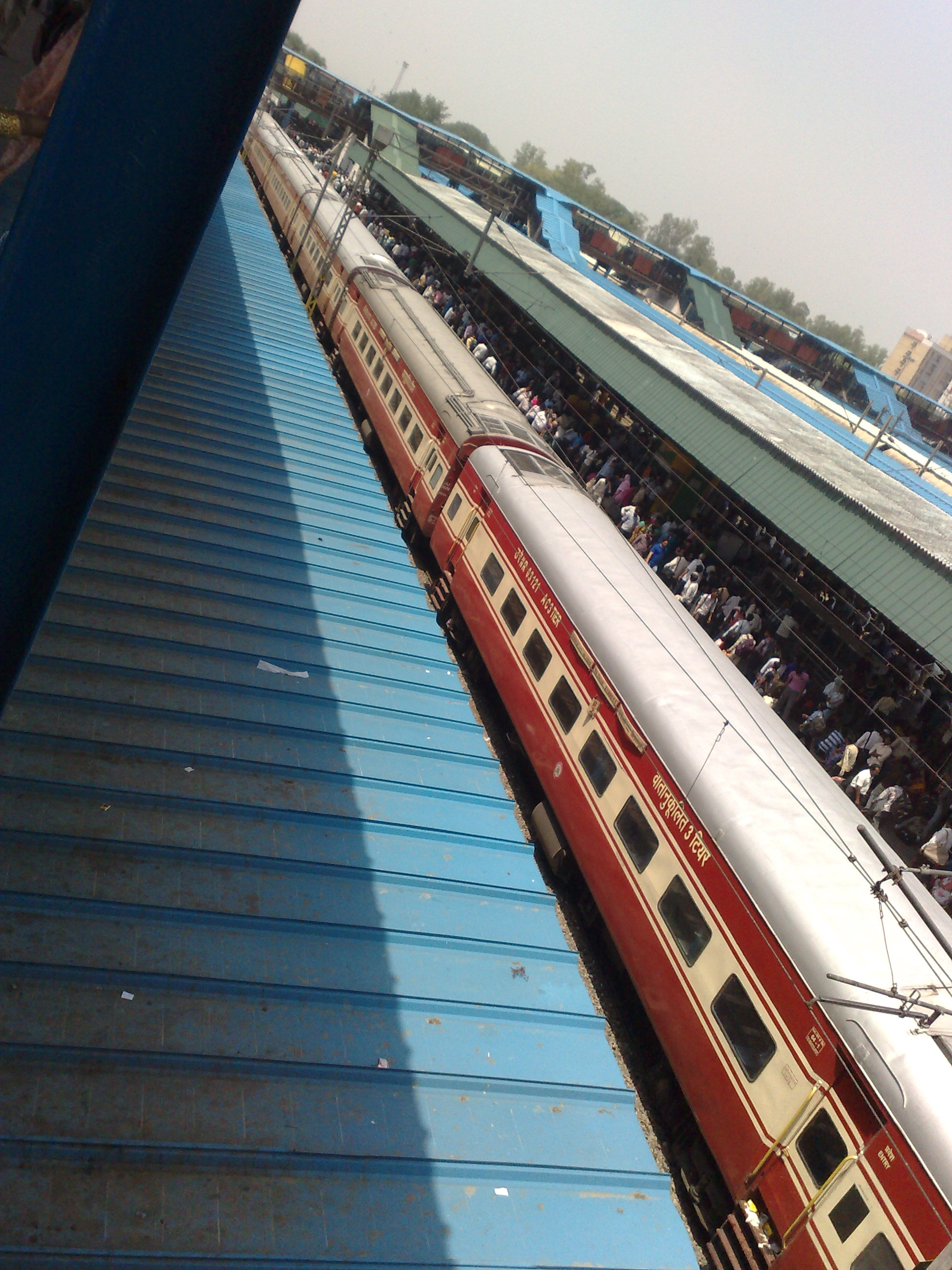
12442 Bilaspur Rajdhani Express at New Delhi

== Route ==
The 12441 / 12442 Bilaspur–New Delhi Rajdhani Express runs from Bilaspur Junction via Raipur Junction, Nagpur New Delhi.

It reverses direction of travel at Nagpur. In the year 2009, this train was extended up till Howrah Junction for providing Bhopal Junction–Howrah Junction connection. That time the train used to depart Howrah Junction at 21.35 P.M., Tatanagar at 01.05 A.M., Bilaspur Junction at 08.05 A.M., Nagpur at 14.35 P.M. and reached New Delhi on 3rd day morning at 05.20 A.M. On return the train used to depart New Delhi at 20.35 P.M., Nagpur at 10.49 A.M., Bilaspur Junction at 17.34 P.M. Tatanagar at 00.40 A.M. and reached Howrah Junction at 04.20 A.M. From grey area of 2009, the extended service was withdrawn.

== Halts ==
• New Delhi

• Gwalior Junction

• VGL Jhansi Junction

• Bhopal Junction

• Nagpur Junction ( Reversal Of train )

• Gondia Junction

• Raj Nandgaon

• Durg Junction

• Raipur Junction

• Bilaspur Junction

== Traction ==
As the route is fully electrified, it is hauled from end to end by a Itarsi Loco Shed-based WAP-7 electric locomotives.

== Timings ==
- 12441 Bilaspur–New Delhi Rajdhani Express leaves Bilaspur Junction every Monday & Thursday at 14:00 hrs IST and reaches New Delhi at 10:40 hrs IST the next day.
- 12442 New Delhi–Bilaspur Rajdhani Express leaves New Delhi every Tuesday & Saturday at 15:25 hrs IST and reaches Bilaspur Junction at 12:00 hrs IST the next day.

== Rake sharing ==
This train shares its rake with 12453/12454 Ranchi Rajdhani ( Via Chopan ) and this train also shares its rake with 20407/20408 Ranchi rajdhani ( Via Jalpa ).
