= National Highway 943 (India) =

National highway in India

National Highway 943
- National Highway highlighted in red

Route information
- Auxiliary route of NH 43
- Length: 166 km (103 mi)

Major junctions
- West end: Pawai
- NH43, NH39 & NH35
- East end: Atarra

Location
- Country: India
- States: Madhya Pradesh & Uttar Pradesh
- Primary destinations: Nagod, Kalinjar, Naraini, Atarra.

Highway system
- Roads in India; Expressways; National; State; Asian
← NH 43	→ NH 39

National Highway 943, commonly referred to as NH 943 is a national highway in India. It is a spur road of National Highway 43. NH-943 traverses the states of Madhya Pradesh & Uttar Pradesh in India.

== Route ==
Pawai - Saleha - (Jaso) Jassu - Nagod - Kalinjar - Naraini - Atarra .

== Junctions ==
NH 43 Terminal near Pawai.
NH 39 near Nagod.
NH 35 Terminal near Atarra.

== See also ==
- List of national highways in India
- List of national highways in India by state
