= National Highway 143AG (India) =

National Highway in India

National Highway 143AG
- Map of National Highway 143AG in red

Route information
- Auxiliary route of NH 43
- Length: 134.5 km (83.6 mi)

Major junctions
- West end: Lohardaga
- East end: Tamar

Location
- Country: India
- States: Jharkhand

Highway system
- Roads in India; Expressways; National; State; Asian
← NH 143A	→ NH 43

National Highway 143AG, commonly referred to as NH 143AG is a national highway in India. It is a secondary route of National Highway 43. NH-143AG runs in the state of Jharkhand in India.

== Route ==
NH143AG connects Lohardaga, Bhandra, Bero, Karra, Khunti and Tamar in the state of Jharkhand.

== Junctions ==
NH 143A Terminal near Lohardaga.
NH 43 Terminal near Tamar.

== See also ==
- List of national highways in India
- List of national highways in India by state
