= National Highway 339 (India) =

National highway in India

National Highway 339
- Map of National Highway 339 in red

Route information
- Length: 80 km (50 mi)

Major junctions
- From: Harpalpur
- To: Mahoba

Location
- Country: India
- Primary destinations: Panwari, Kulpahar

Highway system
- Roads in India; Expressways; National; State; Asian
| ← NH 39 | → NH 34 |

National Highway 339 (NH 339) is a National Highway in India.
