= National Highway 39 (India) =

National highway in India

National Highway 39
- Map of the National Highway in red
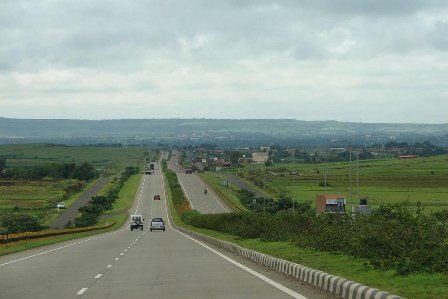
- NH 39 (former NH75)

Route information
- Length: 869 km (540 mi)

Major junctions
- West end: NH 27 in Jhansi
- List: NH 539 in Jhansi; NH 339 in Nowgaon; NH 34 in Chhatarpur; NH 339B in Bamitha; NH 943 in Nagod; NH 135BG in Satna; NH 30 in Rewa; NH 135C in Singrauli; NH 343 in Garhwa; NH 139 in Medininagar; NH 22 in Chandwa; NH 143A in Kuru
- East end: NH 43 in Ranchi

Location
- Country: India
- States: Uttar Pradesh, Madhya Pradesh, Jharkhand

Highway system
- Roads in India; Expressways; National; State; Asian
← NH 27	→ NH 43

Schematic map of National Highways in India

National Highway 39 (NH 39) is a National Highway in India. This highway passes through the Indian states of Madhya Pradesh, Uttar Pradesh and Jharkhand.

== Route ==
This 869-kilometre-long (540 mi) highway passes through Jhansi, Chhatarpur, Panna, Satna, Rewa, Rampur Naikin, Sidhi, Singrauli, Renukut, Shaktinagar, and some major town in Jharkhand with 604-kilometre-long (375 mi) length in Madhya Pradesh and Uttar Pradesh and rest 265-kilometre-long (165 mi) stretch in Jharkhand, starting from Kanhar near Garhwa , connecting NH-139 in Daltonganj, then passes through Latehar, connecting NH-22 at Chandwa, connecting NH-143A in Kuru, Lohardaga then passes through Chanho, Mandar, Ratu, and finally ends at Ring Road, Tupudana, Ranchi

== Route conditions ==
NH39 is one of the worst highways in India as per route conditions. The highway is 4 laned between Jhansi-Khajuraho, Satna-Rewa, Sidhi-Tenduha, Garhwa-Kundi and Kuru, Lohardaga-Ranchi stretches covering just 370-kilometre-long (230 mi) of distance. Rest 499-kilometre-long (310 mi) is 2-laned and has serious bad road conditions. NHAI is working to make 192-kilometre-long (119 mi) more stretch into 4 lane by 2026.

== See also ==
- List of national highways in India
- National Highways Development Project
