= National Highway 343 (India) =

National highway in India

National Highway 343
- Map of National Highway 343 in red

Route information
- Length: 190.6 km (118.4 mi)

Major junctions
- South end: Ambikapur
- North end: Garhwa

Location
- Country: India
- States: Chhattisgarh, Jharkhand

Highway system
- Roads in India; Expressways; National; State; Asian
← NH 43	→ NH 39

National Highway 343, commonly referred to as NH 343 is a national highway in India. It is a spur road of National Highway 43. NH-343 traverses the states of Chhattisgarh and Jharkhand in India.

== Route ==
Chhattisgarh

Ambikapur, Semarsot, Ramanujganj,

Jharkhand

Jagmohanpur, Ranka, Jargarh, Annraj Dam, Garhwa, Brahmoriya Morh at Pandwa.

== Junctions ==
- Terminal with National Highway 43 near Ambikapur.
- Terminal with National Highway 39 near Brahmoriya.
- Terminal with National Highway 39 near Pandwa.

== See also ==
- List of national highways in India
- List of national highways in India by state
