= Harpalpur railway station =

Railway station in India

General information
- Location: State Highway 10, Harpalpur, Madhya Pradesh; India
- Coordinates: 25.290°N 79.333°E
- Elevation: 215 metres (705 ft)
- System: Indian Railways station
- Owner: Indian Railways
- Operator: North Central Railway
- Platforms: 1
- Tracks: 2

Construction
- Structure type: Standard (on ground station)
- Parking: no
- Cycle facilities: No

Other information
- Status: Construction – single-line electrification
- Station code: HPP
- Zone(s): North Central Railway
- Division(s): Jhansi
Location

Harpalpur railway station is a small railway station in Chhatarpur district, in India's Madhya Pradesh state. Its code is HPP and serves Harpalpur town. The station consists of two platforms, which are not well sheltered. It lacks many facilities including water and sanitation.
