= Alipura State =

Princely state in the Indian state of Madhya Pradesh

- Princely State of British India
- 1757–15 August 1947
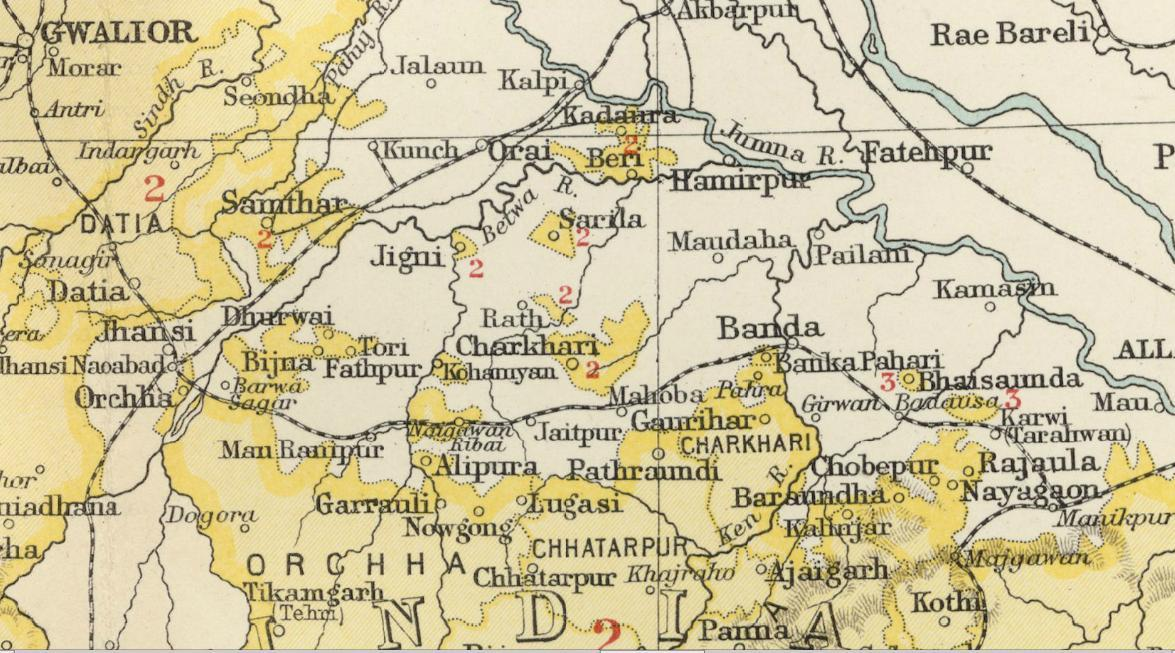
- Alipura State in the Imperial Gazetteer of India
- Area
  - 1931: 189 km^{2} (73 sq mi)
- Population
  - 1931: 15,316
- History
  - Established: 1757
  - British seizuranity ended: 15 August 1947
Succeeded by
India
- Today part of: Madhya Pradesh, India

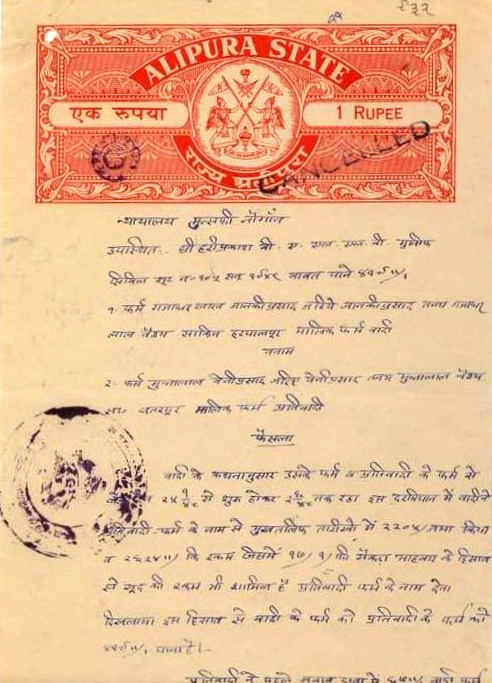
The symbols of Alipura State on a stamped paper.

Alipura was a princely state in what is today the Chhatarpur District in the Indian state of Madhya Pradesh.

Alipura, the capital of the state is located between Gwalior and Satna at 25°10′31″N 79°20′08″E and had a population of 3,232 according to the 1881 Census of India.

== History ==
The state was established in 1757 by Aman Singh, Raja of Panna State by granting the lands surrounding Alipura town to Achal Singh, son of Mukund Singh, who was the sardar of Panna at that time. The principality became a British protectorate in 1808 and was made part of the Bundelkhand Agency of Central India.

The last Pratihara ruler of Alipura signed the instrument of accession to the Indian Union on 1 January 1950.

=== Rulers ===
The rulers used the title Rao.

==== Title Rao ====
- 1757–1790 Achal Singh (d. 1790)
- 1790–1835 Pratap Singh
- 1835–1840 Pancham Singh
- 1840–1841 Daulat Singh
- 1841–1871 Hindupat Singh (d. 1871)
- 3 November 1871 – 1922 Chhatrapati Singh (b. 1853 – d. 1922)
- 26 Mar 1922 – Nov 1934 Harpal Singh (b. 1882 – d. 1934) (regent 1919 – 1922)
- Nov 1934 – 1934 Bhopal Singh Ju Deo
- 1934–15 Aug 1947 Raghuraj Singh Ju Deo (b. 1901 – d. 1987)

=== Alipura palace ===
Built by the rulers of Alipura State the main part of palace is about 150 years old, with a section that is over 3 centuries old. The building has been renovated and converted to a heritage hotel that is run by a direct descendant of the former ruling family.

== See also ==
- Political integration of India
