= National Highway 135BD (India) =

National Highway in India

National Highway 135BD
- Map of National Highway 135BD in red

Route information
- Auxiliary route of NH 35
- Length: 36 km (22 mi)

Major junctions
- West end: Sirmaur
- East end: Kalwari

Location
- Country: India
- States: Madhya Pradesh

Highway system
- Roads in India; Expressways; National; State; Asian
| ← NH 135B | → NH 30 |

National Highway 135BD, commonly referred to as NH 135BD is a national highway in India. It is a spur road of National Highway 35. NH-135BD traverses the state of Madhya Pradesh in India.

== Route ==
NH135BD connects Sirmaur, Kolha, Rajgarh, Kyoti, Bagahaiya, Lalgaon, Pangadi, bans and Kalwari.

== Junctions ==
NH 135B Terminal near Sirmaur.
NH 30 Terminal near Jamira.

== See also ==
- List of national highways in India
- List of national highways in India by state
