= National Highway 731AG (India) =

National Highway in India

National Highway 731AG
- Map of National Highway 731AG in red

Route information
- Auxiliary route of NH 31
- Length: 17.8 km (11.1 mi)

Major junctions
- North end: Rajapur, Uttar Pradesh
- South end: Raipura

Location
- Country: India
- States: Uttar Pradesh

Highway system
- Roads in India; Expressways; National; State; Asian
← NH 731A	→ NH 35

National Highway 731AG, commonly referred to as NH 731AG is a national highway in India. It is a spur road of National Highway 31. NH-731AG runs in the state of Uttar Pradesh in India.

== Route ==
NH731AG connects Rajapur, Ramtekra and Raipura in the state of Uttar Pradesh.

== Junctions ==
NH 731A Terminal near Rajapur.
NH 35 Terminal near Raipura.

== See also ==
- List of national highways in India
- List of national highways in India by state
