= National Highway 731A (India) =

National highway in India

National Highway 731A
- Map of National Highway 731A in red

Route information
- Auxiliary route of NH 31
- Length: 160 km (99 mi)

Major junctions
- North end: Pratapgarh
- South end: Chitrakoot

Location
- Country: India
- States: Uttar Pradesh
- Primary destinations: Jethwara, Shrangverpur, Manjhanpur, Rajapur

Highway system
- Roads in India; Expressways; National; State; Asian
← NH 31	→ NH 35

National Highway 731A, commonly referred to as NH 731A is a national highway in India. It is a spur road of National Highway 31. NH-731A traverses the state of Uttar Pradesh in India.

== Route ==
Pratapgarh - Jethwara - Shrangverpur - Manjhanpur - Rajapur - Chitrakoot.

== Junctions ==
NH 31 Terminal near Pratapgarh.
NH 30 near Lalgopalganj
NH 19 near Muratganj
NH 731AG near Rajapur
NH 35 Terminal near Chitrakoot.

== See also ==
- List of national highways in India
- List of national highways in India by state
