= Mandar, Ranchi =

Mandar
- Village
- Location in Jharkhand, India Mandar (India)
- Coordinates: 23.4632°N 85.0914°E
- Country: India
- State: Jharkhand
- District: Ranchi

Population (2011)
  - Total: 4,027

Languages (*For language details see Mandar block#Language and religion)
  - Official: Hindi, Urdu
- Time zone: UTC+5:30 (IST)
- PIN: 835214
- Telephone/ STD code: 06531
- Vehicle registration: JH 01
- Literacy: 78.62%
- Lok Sabha constituency: Lohardaga
- Vidhan Sabha constituency: Mandar
- Website: ranchi.nic.in

Mandar is a village in the Mandar CD block in the Ranchi Sadar subdivision of the Ranchi district in the Indian state of Jharkhand.

== Geography ==
Cities, towns and locations in Ranchi district in South Chotanagpur Division
M: municipality, CT: census town, R: rural/ urban centre, N: neighbourhood, T: tourist centre, D: dam, H: historical/ religious centre
Owing to space constraints in the small map, the actual locations in a larger map may vary slightly

=== Location ===
Mandar is located at 23.4632°N 85.0914°E.

=== Area overview ===
The map alongside shows a part of the Ranchi plateau, most of it at an average elevation of 2,140 feet above sea level. Only a small part in the north-eastern part of the district is the lower Ranchi plateau, spread over Silli, Rahe, Sonahatu and Tamar CD blocks, at an elevation of 500 to 1,000 feet above sea level. There is a 16 km long ridge south-west of Ranchi. There are isolated hills in the central plateau. The principal river of the district, the Subarnarekha, originates near Ratu, flows in an easterly direction and descends from the plateau, with a drop of about 300 feet at Hundru Falls. Subarnarekha and other important rivers are marked on the map. The forested area is shaded in the map. A major part of the North Karanpura Area and some fringe areas of the Piparwar Area of the Central Coalfields Limited, both located in the North Karanpura Coalfield, are in Ranchi district. There has been extensive industrial activity in Ranchi district, since independence. Ranchi district is the first in the state in terms of population. 8.83% of the total population of the state lives in this district - 56.9% is rural population and 43.1% is urban population.

Note: The map alongside presents some of the notable locations in the district. All places marked in the map are linked in the larger full screen map.

== Civic administration ==
=== Police station ===
There is a police station at Mandar.

=== CD block HQ ===
The headquarters of Mandar CD block are located at Mandar.

== Demographics ==
According to the 2011 Census of India, Mandar had a total population of 4,027, of which 2,031 (50%) were males and 1,996 (50%) were females. Population in the age range 0–6 years was 594. The total number of literate persons in Mandar was 2,699 (78.62% of the population over 6 years).

== Transport ==
National Highway 39 (Ranchi-Daltonganj), an important roadway in Ranchi district, passes through Mandar.

== Education ==
St. Anne's Intermediate College is a Hindi-medium coeducational institution established 2013. It has facilities for teaching in classes XI and XII. It has a playground, a library with 520 books, and has 20 computers for teaching and learning purposes.

Kasturba Gandhi Balika Vidyalaya is a Hindi-medium girls only institution established in 2006. It has facilities for teaching from class VI to class 12. It has a library with 1,255 books and has 5 computers for teaching and learning purposes.

St. Xavier's High School is a Hindi-medium coeducational institution established in 1972. It has facilities for teaching from class VII to class X. It has a play ground, a library with 1,500 books, and has a computer for teaching and learning purposes.

St. Anna High School is a Hindi-medium girls only institution established in 1963. It has facilities for teaching from class VII to class X. It has a playground, a library with 1,030 books, and has 18 computers for teaching and learning purposes.

American Public High School is an English-medium coeducational institution established in 2005. It has facilities for teaching from class I to class X. It has a playground a library with 200 books.

Maulana Azad Academy is a Hindi-medium coeducational institution established in 2003. It has facilities for teaching from class I to class X. It has a playground.
