= Alipura (Madhya Pradesh) =

- town
- Location in Madhya Pradesh, India
- Coordinates: 25°10′31″N 79°20′8″E
- Country: India
- State: Madhya Pradesh
- District: Chhatarpur
- Tehsil: Nowgong
- Elevation: 210 m (690 ft)

Population (2011)
  - Total: 8,341

Languages
  - Official: Hindi
- Time zone: UTC+5:30 (IST)
- PIN: 471111
- STD: 07685
- ISO 3166 code: IN-MP
- Vehicle registration: MP

Alipura is a town in Nowgong tehsil, Chhatarpur district, Sagar division of Madhya Pradesh, India. It is located near Harpalpur at an altitude of 432 metres (1,417 ft) above sea level. The language of the local population is Hindi.

== History ==
Alipura was formerly the capital of the princely state of Alipura in Central India, which was under the Bundelkhand Agency. The state had a population of 15,316 in 1931. The principality of Alipura was founded in 1757 by Hundupat Aman Singh, Raja of Panna State by granting the lands surrounding the town to Achal Singh, son of Mukund Singh, who was the sardar of Panna at that time.

The palace of the former princely rulers of Alipura is now a heritage hotel run by a direct descendant of the ruling family.
