= National Highway 335 (India) =

National highway in India

National Highway 335
- Map of National Highway 335 in red

Route information
- Auxiliary route of NH 35
- Length: 110 km (68 mi)

Major junctions
- From: Banda
- To: Lalganj

Location
- Country: India
- States: Uttar Pradesh
- Primary destinations: Fatehpur, Raebareli, Banda

Highway system
- Roads in India; Expressways; National; State; Asian
← NH 35	→ NH 31

National Highway 335 (NH 335) is a National Highway in India.
