= National Highway 143A (India) =

National highway in India

National Highway 143A
- Map of the National Highway in red

Route information
- Length: 71 km (44 mi)

Major junctions
- South end: Gumla
- North end: Kuru

Location
- Country: India
- States: Jharkhand

Highway system
- Roads in India; Expressways; National; State; Asian
← NH 43	→ NH 39

National Highway 143A, commonly called NH 143A is a national highway in India. It is a spur road of National Highway 43. NH-143A traverses the state of Jharkhand in India.

== Route ==
Gumla, Ghaghra, Lohardaga, Kuru

== Junctions ==
Terminal with National Highway 43 near Gumla.

Terminal with National Highway 39 near Kuru.

== See also ==
- List of national highways in India
