= Lohardaga railway station =

Railway station in Jharkhand

LOHARDAGA

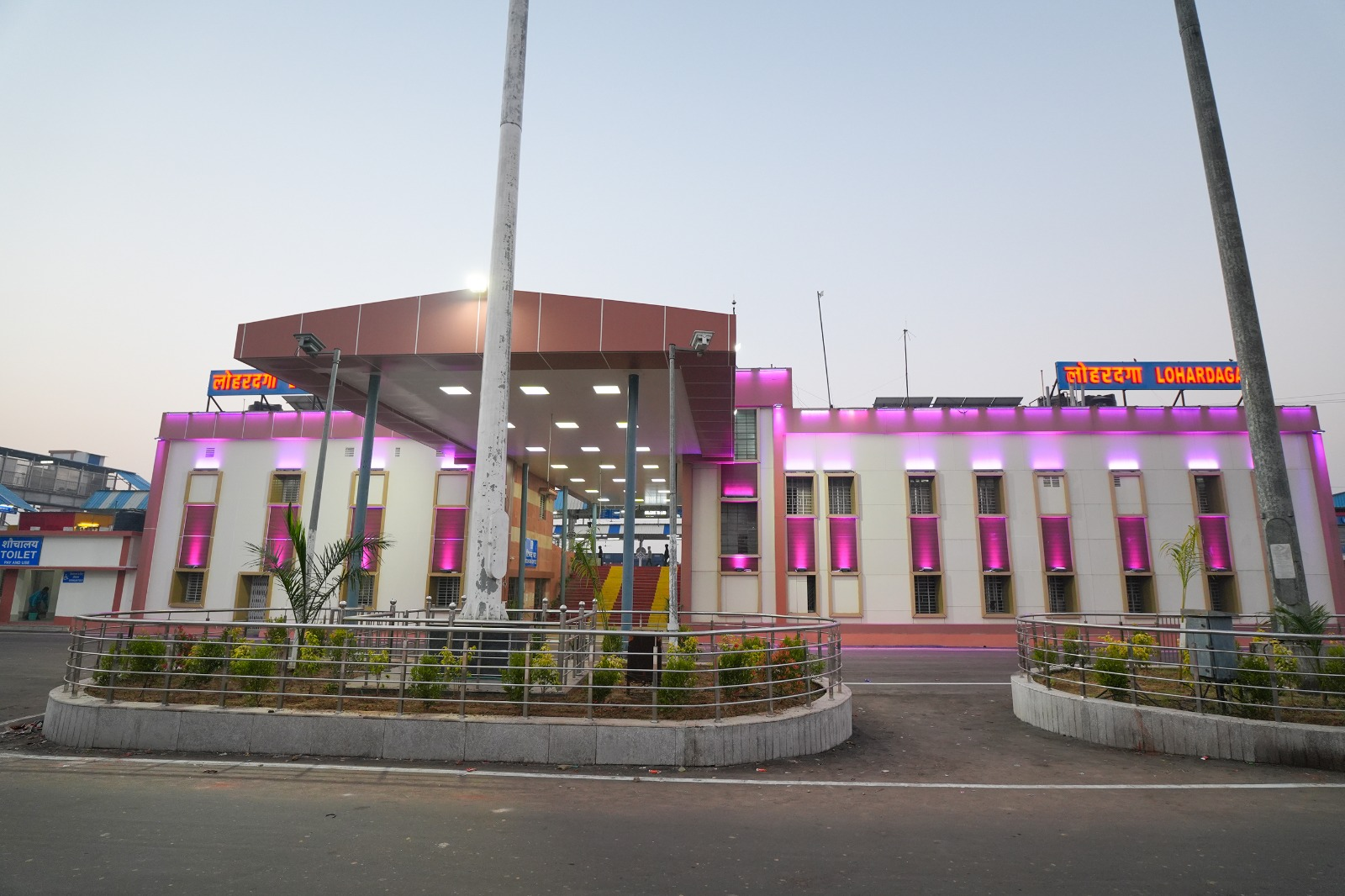

General information
- Location: Lohardaga, Lohardaga district, Jharkhand; India
- Coordinates: 23°26′48″N 84°42′24″E
- Elevation: 643 metres (2,110 ft)
- System: Indian Railways station
- Owner: Indian Railways
- Operator: South Eastern Railway
- Line: Barkakana-Son Nagar line
- Platforms: 3

Construction
- Parking: Available

Other information
- Status: Active
- Station code: LAD
- Zone(s): South Eastern Railway
- Division(s): Ranchi Division
Route map
Location

Lohardaga railway station (station code: LAD), is the railway station serving the city of Lohardaga which is the headquarters of the Lohardaga district in the Indian state of Jharkhand. Lohardaga station belongs to the Ranchi division of the South Eastern Railway zone of the Indian Railways.

== History ==
The 68 kilometres (42 mi) railway track was converted from narrow gauge (2'6") to broad gauge in 2005. The track is planned to be extended 44 km more to connect with Tori railway station in Chandwa town in Latehar district. This would reduce the railway distance between Ranchi and Delhi and the railway travel time by three hours.

== Facilities ==
The major facilities available are waiting rooms, retiring room, computerized reservation facility, reservation counter, Vehicle parking etc. The vehicles are allowed to enter the station premises. Security personnel from the Government Railway Police (G.R.P.) are present for security.

External videos
- Video of Lohardaga Station in HD taken from a moving trainretrieved 28.04.2012

=== Platforms ===
The platforms are interconnected with foot overbridge (FOB).

== Trains ==
Several local passenger trains also run from Lohardaga to neighbouring destinations on frequent intervals. /* Train

Train name	Train number	Source	Destination
Ranchi Tori Passenger	08653	Ranchi	Tori
Tori–Ranchi Passenger	08654	Tori	Ranchi
Ranchi–Lohardaga Passenger	58657	Ranchi	Lohardaga
Lohardaga–Ranchi Passenger	58658	Lohardaga	Ranchi
Ranchi–Lohardaga Passenger	58653	Ranchi	Lohardaga
Lohardaga–Ranchi Passenger	58654	Lohardaga	Ranchi
Ranchi– Lohardaga Passenger	58651	Ranchi	Lohardaga
Lohardaga–Ranchi Passenger	58652	Lohardaga	Ranchi

== Nearest airport ==
The nearest airport to Lohardaga Station are

1. Birsa Munda Airport, Ranchi 71 kilometres (44 mi)
2. Gaya Airport, Gaya 163 kilometres (101 mi)
3. Lok Nayak Jayaprakash Airport, Patna 276 kilometres (171 mi)
4. Netaji Subhash Chandra Bose International Airport, Kolkata
