= National Highway 135BG (India) =

National Highway in India

National Highway 135BG
- Map of National Highway 135BG in red

Route information
- Auxiliary route of NH 35
- Length: 230 km (140 mi)

Major junctions
- North end: Chitrakoot
- South end: Umaria

Location
- Country: India
- States: Madhya Pradesh, Uttar Pradesh

Highway system
- Roads in India; Expressways; National; State; Asian
| ← NH 35 | → NH 43 |

National Highway 135BG, commonly referred to as NH 135BG is a 230 kilometres (140 mi) long national highway in India. It is a spur road of National Highway 35. NH-135BG traverses the states of Madhya Pradesh and Uttar Pradesh in India.

== Route ==
Uttar Pradesh

Ahmadganj - Chitrakoot - Pindra(M.P. border).

Madhya Pradesh

Pindra(U.P. border) - Majhgawan - Satna - Maihar - Sarlanagar, Barhi - Khitouli - Umaria.

From Pindra to Boda Pokhari near Rajapura via Manikpur, a sub spur road of NH135BG is known as National Highway 135BF(India)|NH135BF which runs for 59.2 kilometres (36.8 mi) to connect Manikpur with NH35 & NH135BG

== Junctions ==
NH 35 Terminal at Ahmadganj near Chitrakoot.
NH135BF Terminal at Pindra near UP-MP Border.
NH 30 Terminal near Maihar.
NH 43 Terminal near Umaria.

== See also ==
- List of national highways in India
- List of national highways in India by state
