= National Highway 35 (India) =

National highway in India

National Highway 35
- Map of National Highway 35 in red

Route information
- Length: 462.25 km (287.23 mi)

Major junctions
- West end: NH 34 in Kabrai
- List: NH 335 in Banda; NH 135BG / NH 731A in Chitrakoot Dham; NH 731AG in Raipura; NH 135BB in Jamira; NH 30 in Jasra; NH 135C in Rampur; NH 135 / NH 135A in Mirzapur
- East end: NH 19 in Varanasi

Location
- Country: India
- States: Uttar Pradesh
- Primary destinations: Harpalpur, Khajuraho, Mahoba, Banda, Karwi, Mau, Prayagraj, Mirzapur

Highway system
- Roads in India; Expressways; National; State; Asian
← NH 34	→ NH 19

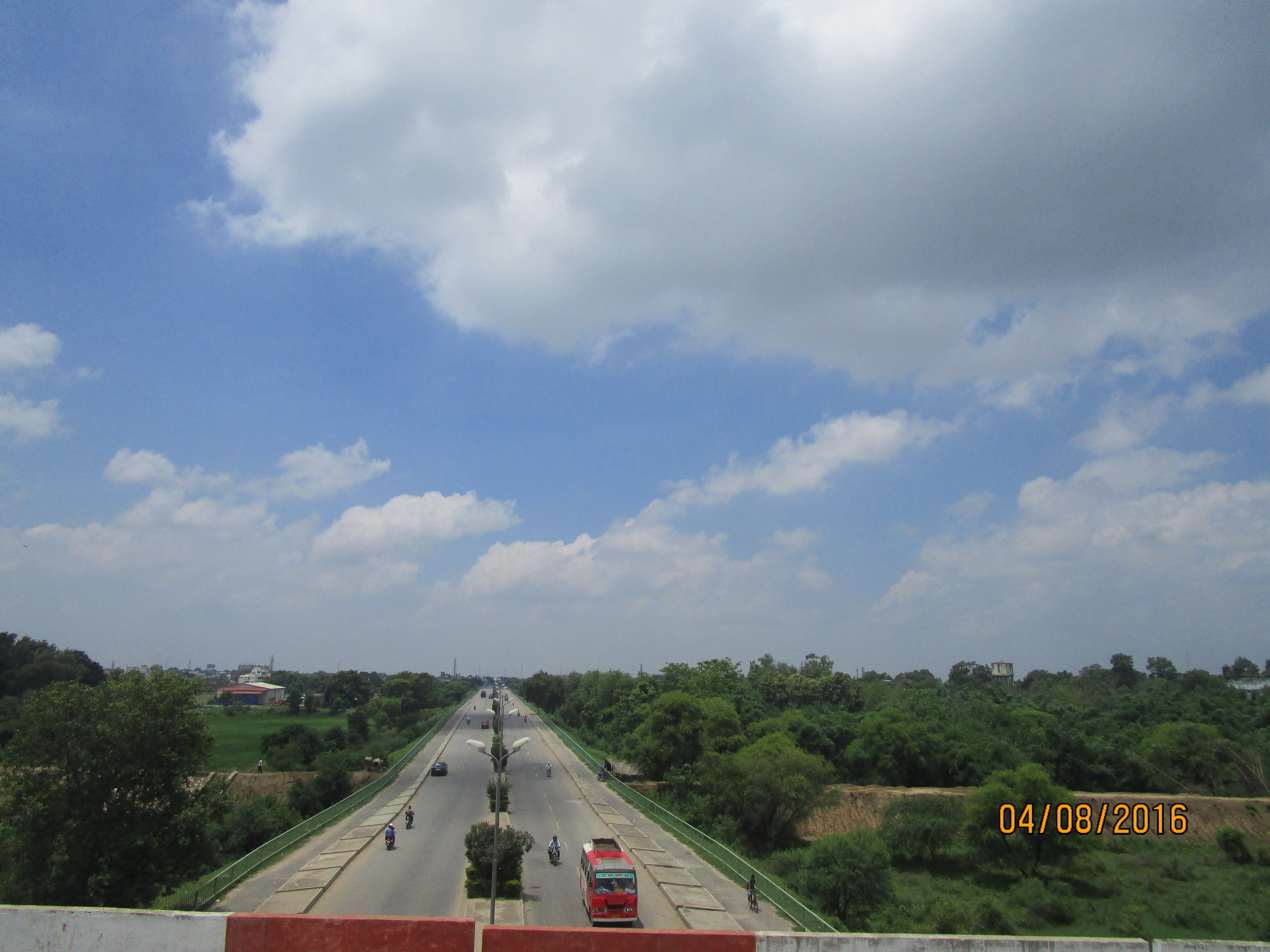
NH 35 (India)

National Highway 35 (NH 35) is a National Highway in India. This highway used to run entirely in the state of Uttar Pradesh but now extension to Khajuraho in Madhya Pradesh is being done.

== Route ==
Khajuraho, Dumra Chauraha, Ragoli, Mahoba, Kabrai, Banda, Karwi Mau, Prayagraj, Mirzapur, Varanasi. Actual route currently is from Harpalpur to Varanasi via Mahoba, Kabrai, Banda, Chitrakoot Dham Karwi, Mau, Prayagraj & Mirzapur.
