= National Highway 43 (India) =

National highway in India

National Highway 43
- Map of National Highway 43 in red

Route information
- Length: 1,062.5 km (660.2 mi)

Major junctions
- West end: Gulluganj, Madhya Pradesh
- East end: Chaibasa, Jharkhand

Location
- Country: India
- States: Madhya Pradesh, Chhattisgarh, Jharkhand

Highway system
- Roads in India; Expressways; National; State; Asian
← NH 34	→ NH 20

National Highway 43 (NH 43) is a primary National Highway in India. It traverses from Gulluganj in Madhya Pradesh, through Chhattisgarh and terminates at Chaibasa in Jharkhand. This national highway is 1,062.5 km (660.2 mi) long. Before renumbering of national highways NH-6 was variously numbered as old national highways 78, 23 & 33.

== Route ==
Schematic map of National Highways in India

=== Madhya Pradesh ===
Gulluganj, Rajpua Amanganj, Pawai, Katni, Umaria, Shahdol, Anuppur, Kotma.

=== Chhattisgarh ===
Manendragarh, Baikunthpur, Surajpur, Ambikapur, Pathalgaon, Jashpurnagar. Manjhatoli

=== Jharkhand ===
Gumla,Sisai, Bero, Nagri, Ranchi, Bundu, Tamar, Chandil, Seraikela, Chaibasa.

The Shahdol-Rewa Road has been renumbered as National Highway 243 (India)|NH243' which runs for 170 kilometres (110 mi) via Jaisinghnagar, Beohari, Bansagar & Govindgarh.

== Junctions ==
NH 34 Terminal near Gulluganj.
NH 943 near Pawai.
NH 30 near Katni.
NH 135BG near Umaria.

NH243(Shahdol-Rewa Road) near Shahdol.

NH 543 near Shahdol.
NH 343 near Ambikapur.
NH 130 near Ambikapur.
NH 143 near Gumla.
NH 143A near Gumla.
NH 143AG near Tamar.
NH 18 near Chandil.
NH 20 near Chaibasa.

== Route conditions ==
NH43 is sadly one of the worst Highways of India. The highway is 4 laned in Tamar - Ranchi - Patra near Gumla stretch only covering just 142 kilometres (88 mi) of the total route. Rest 819 kilometres (509 mi) stretch is 2 laned with 4 lane is now being constructed in 300 kilometres (190 mi) more distance. The stretch between Ambikapur to Jashpurnagar is very seriously in bad conditions. The stretch between Gulluganj to Katni is also in serious bad conditions.

== See also ==
- List of national highways in India
