= Raipura, Firozabad =

Village in Uttar Pradesh, India

Raipura
- Village
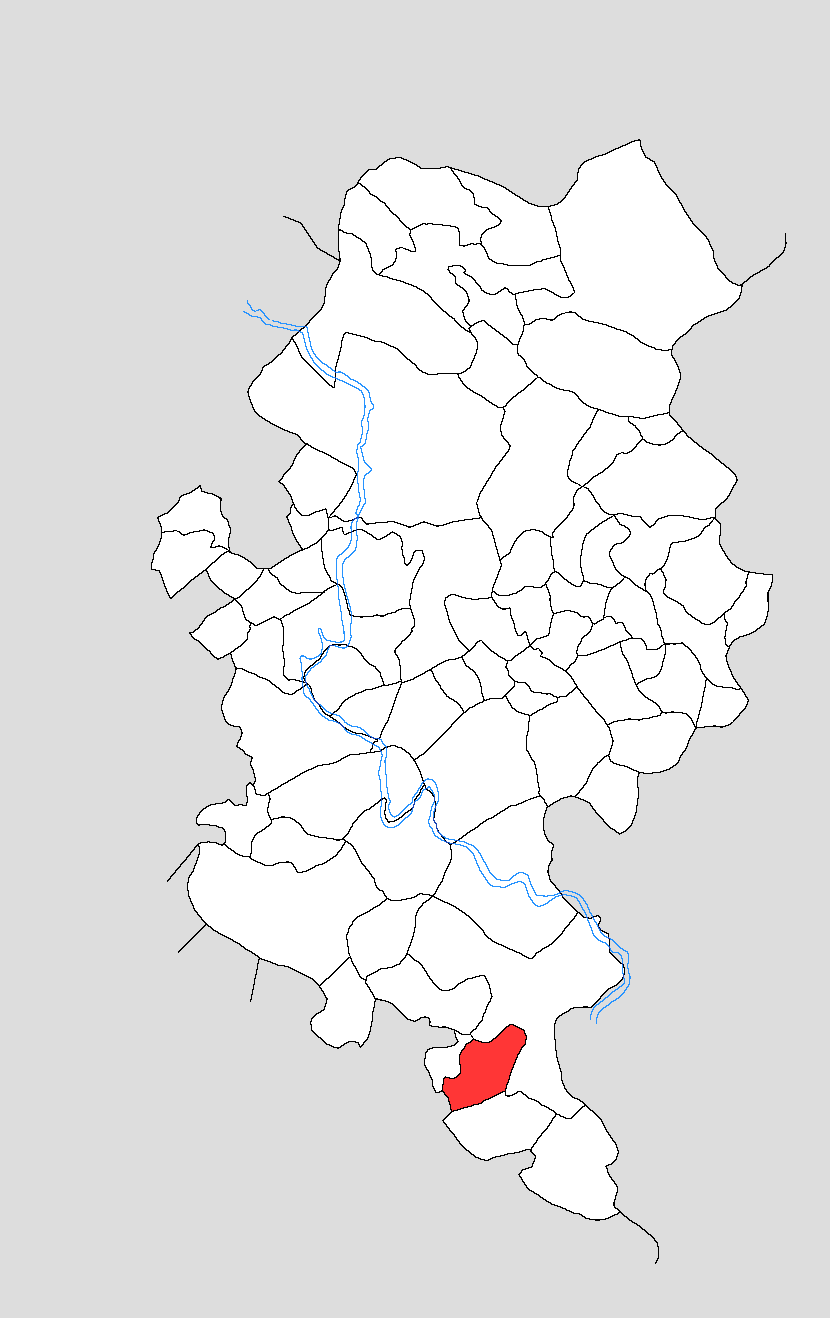
- Map showing Raipura in Kotla block

- Location in Uttar Pradesh, India
- Coordinates: 27.17819°N 78.41628°E
- Country: India
- State: Uttar Pradesh
- District: Firozabad
- Tehsil: Firozabad

Area
  - Total: 2.185 km^{2} (0.844 sq mi)

Population (2011)
  - Total: 4,419
  - Density: 2,022/km^{2} (5,238/sq mi)
- Time zone: UTC+5:30 (IST)

Raipura (Raipurā) is a village in Kotla block of Firozabad district, Uttar Pradesh. As of 2011, it has a population of 4,419, in 735 households.

== Demographics ==
As of 2011, Raipura had a population of 4,419, in 735 households. This population was 53.2% male (2,350) and 46.8% female (2,069). The 0-6 age group numbered 738 (393 male and 345 female), making up 16.7% of the total population. 1,656 residents were members of Scheduled Castes, or 37.5% of the total.

The 1981 census recorded Raipura as having a population of 1,707 people (921 male and 786 female), in 313 households and 310 physical houses.

The 1961 census recorded Raipura as comprising 2 hamlets, with a total population of 1,171 people (637 male and 534 female), in 217 households and 171 physical houses. The area of the village was given as 548 acres and it had a medical practitioner at that point.

== Infrastructure ==
As of 2011, Raipura had 3 primary schools; it did not have any healthcare facilities. Drinking water was provided hand pump and tube well/borehole; there were no public toilets. The village had a sub post office but no public library; there was at least some access to electricity for all purposes. Streets were made of both kachcha and pakka materials.
