= National Highway 135 (India) =

National highway in India

National Highway 135
- Map of National Highway 135 in red

Route information
- Auxiliary route of NH 35
- Length: 130 km (81 mi)

Major junctions
- From: Mirzapur
- To: Mangawan

Location
- Country: India
- States: Madhya Pradesh, Uttar Pradesh

Highway system
- Roads in India; Expressways; National; State; Asian
← NH 134	→ NH 136

National Highway 135 is a national highway of India. It is a branch of National Highway 35.

National Highway 135 (NH135), total length: 130 km (81 mi)

States: Madhya Pradesh, Uttar Pradesh

== Route ==
NH 135 originates from Mirzapur in Uttar Pradesh and terminates at Mangawan in Madhya Pradesh. The highway passing through Mauganj, Hanumana, Deotalab towns.

== Junctions ==
- Junction with NH35 at Mirzapur
- Junction with NH30 at Mangawan

== See also ==
- List of national highways in India
