= Harpalpur =

- Town
- Location in Madhya Pradesh, India Harpalpur (India)
- Coordinates: 25°19′0″N 79°25′0″E
- Country: India
- State: Madhya Pradesh
- District: Chhatarpur District

Population (2001)
  - Total: 15,410

Languages
  - Official: Hindi
- Time zone: UTC+5:30 (IST)
- PIN: 471111
- ISO 3166 code: IN-MP
- Vehicle registration: MP

Harpalpur is a town and a nagar panchayat in Chhatarpur District in the Indian state of Madhya Pradesh.

Before the inauguration of Khajuraho railway station, Harpalpur was the only railway station in Chhatarpur district. The municipality borders with Uttar Pradesh from three sides.

It has attracted many businessmen from the nearby Uttar Pradesh town of Rath who have settled here. Although it is a small town it has a relatively large number of mustard oil mills and various pulse mills. Padmashri Awadh Jadiya is from Harpalpur.

== Demographics ==
As of 2001 India census, Harpalpur had a population of 15,410. Males constitute 53% of the population and females 47%. Harpalpur has an average literacy rate of 69%, higher than the national average of 59.5%: male literacy is 77%, and female literacy is 60%. In Harpalpur, 15% of the population is under 6 years of age.

== See also ==
- Alipura
