= Tori Junction railway station =

Railway station in Jharkhand, India

TORI JUNCTION

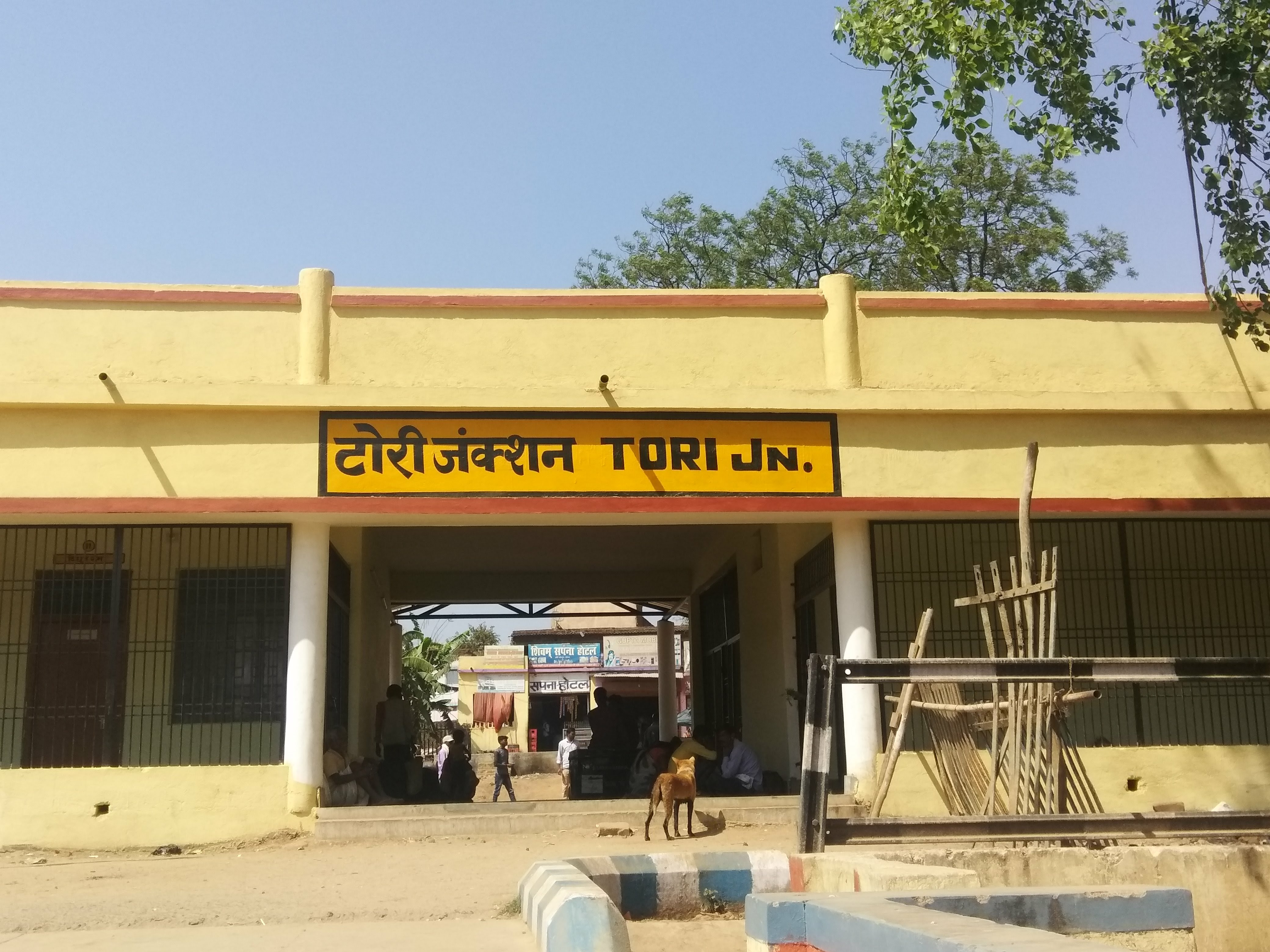

General information
- Location: Tori Chandwa, Latehar district, Jharkhand; India
- Coordinates: 23.6812°N 84.7415°E
- System: Indian Railways station
- Owner: Indian Railways
- Operator: East Central Railway zone
- Lines: Barkakana–Son Nagar line, Ranchi-Tori line and Tori–Shivpur–Koderma line(Under construction)
- Platforms: 5
- Tracks: 10

Construction
- Parking: Available

Other information
- Status: Functional
- Station code: TORI
- Zone(s): East Central Railway zone
- Division(s): Dhanbad division
Location
- Location within Jharkhand Location within India
- Interactive map

Tori Junction, (station code: TORI), is the railway station serving the city of Chandwa which is the connecting point of Latehar and Hazaribag districts. It also connects Lohardaga. It belongs to the East Central Railway zone under Dhanbad railway division of the Indian Railways.

== History ==
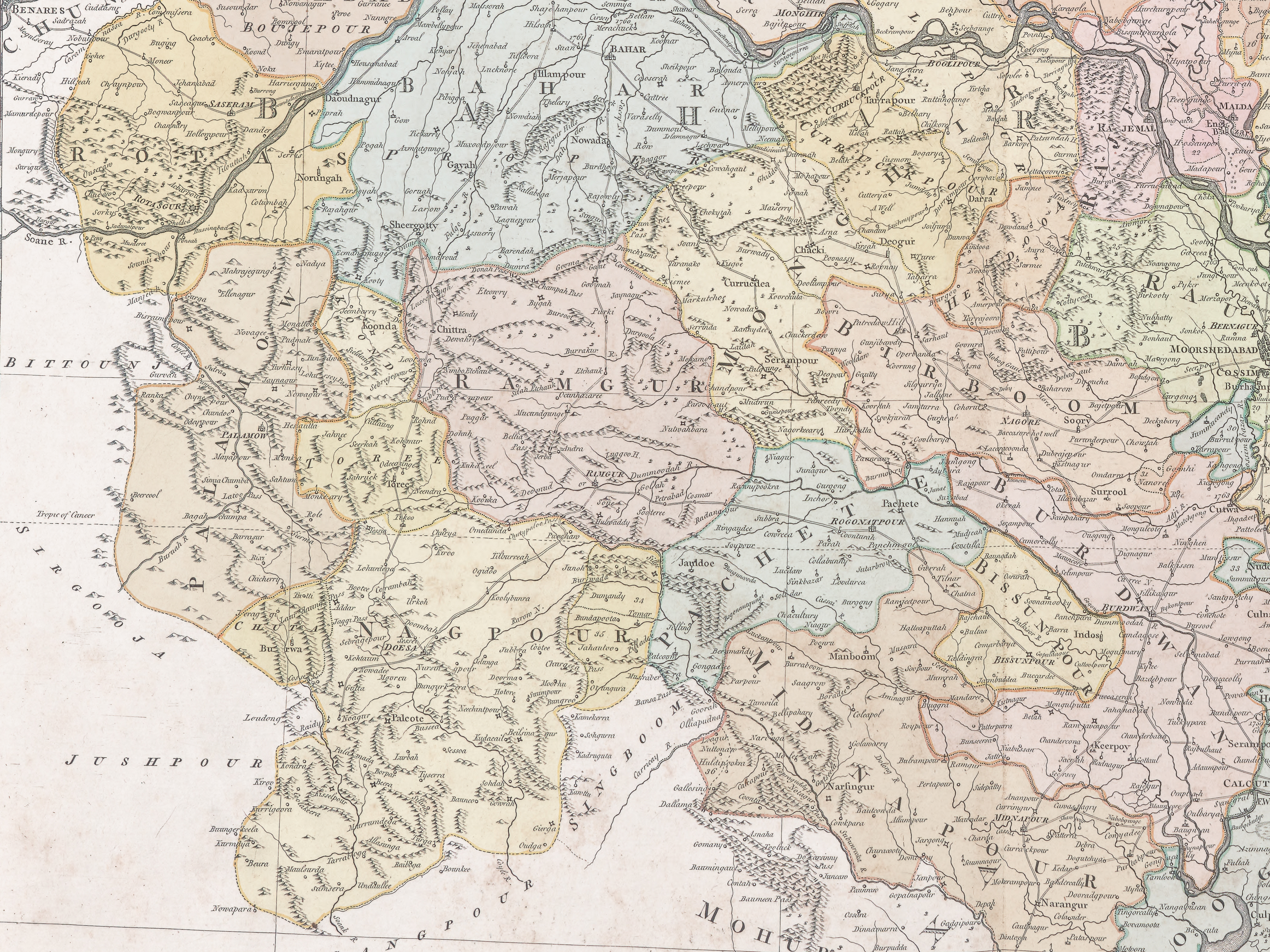
Tori (Toree) in the 1770s, map by James Rennell.

Now the distance between Ranchi and New Delhi got shorter via Lohardaga. It is 90 km less distance between Ranchi and Delhi as compared to via Barkakana and Muri. One passenger train is running between Ranchi and Tori via Lohardaga. This is one of the major junctions that will connect Ranchi and Hazaribag districts of Jharkhand. The ongoing construction work of Tori–Balumath–Shivpur–Kathotia (Hazaribagh) railway line which section is falling under the South Eastern Railway (Ranchi Division) and East Central Railway (Dhanbad Division) jurisdictions, would be completed, till Balumath. After completing this line Tori will be the major junction connecting Ranchi, Barkakana, Hazaribagh and Medininagar.

== Facilities ==
The major facilities available are waiting rooms, retiring room, computerized reservation facility, reservation counter, vehicle parking, etc.

=== Platforms ===
The platforms are interconnected with foot overbridge (FOB). Tori Junction has 5 platforms.

== Trains ==
Several electrified local passenger trains also run from Barwadih to neighbouring destinations on frequent intervals.

Train name	Train number	Source	Destination
Bsb Rnc Express	18612	Varanasi Junction	Ranchi
Sbp Bsb Express	18611	Ranchi	Varanasi Junction
Aii Koaa Special	03138	Ajmer Junction	Howrah Junction
Shaktipunj Express	11447	Howrah Junction	Jabalpur Junction
Jharkhand S J E	12873	Hatia	Anand Vihar Trm
Rnc Garibnwaz E	18631	Ranchi	Ajmer Junction
Sbp Bsb Express	18311	Sambalpur	Varanasi Junction
Rou Muri Jat Express	18109	Rourkela	Jammu Tawi
Garib Rath Express	12877	Ranchi	New Delhi

== Nearest airports ==
The nearest airports to Tori station are:

- Birsa Munda Airport, Ranchi 71 kilometres (44 mi)
- Gaya Airport, Gaya 163 kilometres (101 mi)
- Lok Nayak Jayaprakash Airport, Patna 276 kilometres (171 mi)
- Netaji Subhash Chandra Bose International Airport, Kolkata

== See also ==
- Lohardaga
- Barwadih Junction
- Barwadih
- Latehar
- Palamau
