= Chandwa (community development block) =

- Community development block
- Interactive map of Chandwa
- Location within Jharkhand Location within India
- Coordinates: 23.68°N 84.73°E
- Country: India
- State: Jharkhand
- District: Latehar

Languages
  - Official: Hindi
- Time zone: UTC+5:30 (IST)
- Postal code: 829203
- Vehicle registration: JH
- Website: latehar.nic.in

Chandwa block is a community development block in Latehar district, in Indian state of Jharkhand. It is located around 75 km from Ranchi, the state capital. It is mineral rich like most of Jharkhand State. It lies at the junction for the NH39 and NH99 roads and is also an important railway junction.

== Geography ==
Chandwa is located at 23.68°N 84.73°E. It has an average elevation of 525 m (1,722 ft).

Chandwa Community Block had a population of 81,479 and is the third largest Community Block in Latehar District after Balumath and Latehar respectively. Males constitute 51% of the population and females 49%. Chandwa has an average literacy rate of 41.06%, much lower than the national average of 59.5%: male literacy is 54.91%, and female literacy is 26.58%.

There are a total of 86 villages and 17 panchayats in this Chandwa community block.

== Education ==
1) New Degree College is in under construction
2) New polytechnic college is in under construction
3) Govt. Middle School, Chandwa Situated on NH75 1400 Students 20 Teachers
Hindi is the main language for communication in Chandwa even though a majority of people would speak a dialect coherent with Hindi and a mix of Nagpuriya and Plamau languages.

Even though there are not many English medium schools in Chandwa, in the last 10 years, the local educated youth have come forward and set up a few English medium primary schools.

Opening of Abhijeet DAV public school about 15 Kilometers from Chandwa town has been a boost for the Chandwa.

Abhijeet Group is setting up a Coal Based Thermal Power Plant with total installed capacity of 1740 MW. Several companies signed MoU with the state government, but none could start the work in the district prior to Abhijeet Group.

As the first company in the district of Latehar (highly naxal dominated area) setting up the power plant Abhijeet Group already played a significant role in society, and it also bears a responsibility to help bring about the society of the future.

== Economy ==
The main economy is agriculture and the local business activities that people of chandwa are engaged into.

Recently there have been many positive news about a handful of companies like Essar Power, Abhijeet Group etc. planning to set up power plant projects in the vicinity of Chandwa. Power plant project by Abhijeet group has already attained a substantial development and 270 MW of it is on the verge of commissioning. The project situated in "Chakla", about 10 km away from chandwa on Chandwa-Chatra National Highway #99.
Abhijit Group is scheduled to start power generation by 1st quarter 2013.

Essar Power has also started work on 3x600 MW Mega Thermal Power Project (Essar Projects India Limited) situated at 2 km toward east. Near Damodar, Angarah and Essar TPP will be commissioned for two units in 2014. Few more companies like Adhunik Metaliks, Jindal Power also looking for places to set up their plant and they are considering Chandwa as most suitable place.

== Transport ==
=== Road ===
Chandwa is well connected to the nearby major towns of Jharkhand Chatra, Daltonganj, Lohardaga, Gumla and the state capital Ranchi by road. The national highway NH-75(Now NH 39) connecting State capital Ranchi to the Palamau headquarter Daltonganj via Chandwa town is undergoing the widening currently and it would be a major relief for the local people for commuting to Ranchi and Daltonganj. The common mode of transport usually is privately run buses and other vehicles. Another national highway NH-99(Now NH-22) is connecting to Dobhi (NH-2) and Chandwa via Chatra

=== Rail ===
Chandwa has a railway station which is known as TORI Junction. Trains to National Capital Delhi go through this station and due to lack of railway infrastructure in the other nearby towns, TORI serves as a common railway station for many people. Train services to Dhanbad, New Delhi, Patna, Ranchi, Varanasi, Rourkela, Jammu, Jaipur, Bhopal, Jabalpur, Tatanagar, Howrah, Lohardaga are available on a daily basis from Tori Junction station.

Tori Station is Railway Junction as the new rail route from Lohardaga connected here.

== Healthcare ==
There is one Government hospital near the Chandwa Daltonganj Mod (road turn). Some doctors run their own private clinics in the town. The nearest hospitals are:

1. Tumbagadha in Palamau
2. Sadar Hospital in Lohardaga
3. Mandar Hospital
4. Primary Hospital Chandwa

== Sports ==
Cricket is the primary sport in Chandwa. The ground of Raja Cricket Club, Kamta, is the main playing ground for the local children and boys, SS High School is another playing ground for cricket and football also. Tennis ball cricket is the primary version of cricket that is played there, and local tournaments day/night are held annually.

Apart from cricket, other sports popular in Chandwa include hockey, football, and badminton.

== Entertainment ==
There is no cinema in Chandwa town. The nearest cinemas are Manmati Chitra Mandir in district headquarters Latehar and Alka and Menka Cinema Halls in Lohardaga. Local residents rely on television and a few privately run Video centers in the town.
