= Tilaiya =

Tilaiya Tilaia
- Village
- Location in Jharkhand, India Tilaiya (India)
- Coordinates: 24.3192200°N 85.5296900°E
- Country: India
- State: Jharkhand
- District: Koderma

Languages (*For language details see Chandwara (community development block)#Language and religion)
  - Official: Hindi, Urdu
- Time zone: UTC+5:30 (IST)
- PIN: 825413
- Vehicle registration: JH-12
- Nearest city: Jhumri Telaiya, Kodarma, Hazaribagh, Gaya
- Website: koderma.nic.in

Tilaiya is a village in the Chandwara CD block in the Koderma subdivision of the Koderma district in the Indian state of Jharkhand.

== Geography ==
Cities, towns and locations in Koderma district in North Chotanagpur Division
M: municipality, CT: census town, R: rural/ urban centre, D: dam, P: power plant, T: tourist centre
Owing to space constraints in the small map, the actual locations in a larger map may vary slightly

=== Location ===
Tilaiya is located at 24°19′09″N 85°31′47″E.

=== Overview ===
Koderma district is plateau territory and around 60% of the total area is covered with forests. The first dam of the Damodar Valley Corporation, at Tilaiya, was built across the Barakar River and inaugurated in 1953. Koderma Junction railway station has emerged as an important railway centre in the region. It is a predominantly rural district with only 19.72% urban population.

Note: The map alongside presents some of the notable locations in the district. All places marked in the map are linked in the larger full screen map.

== Tilaiya Dam ==
Tilaiya Dam was constructed by Damodar Valley Corporation across the Barakar River in 1953. It is 366 metres (1,201 ft) long and 30.18 metres (99.0 ft) high. The dam boasts of picturesque surroundings with a reservoir, which extends up to 36 km^{2}. Tilaiya hydro power station is located on the left bank of the Barakar. The structure is entirely of reinforced concrete. It has 2 generating units of 2 MW each.

== Demography ==
Kanti village, near Tilaiya Dam and located on the south side (or left bank) of the Barakar River, has a population, as per 2011 Census of India, of 4,601 (males 2,785 and females 1,826). It is in Chandwara (community development block). A little further away is Barki Dhamrai with a population of 3,277 and Chotki Dhamrai with 1,290 people. Tilaia is a smaller village on the other side of Barakar River. It possibly lent its name to the dam.

== Transport ==
- Tilaiya Dam is off the Patna-Ranchi highway (NH 20), the latter passes along the reservoir. While (DVC) Tilaiya Dam is 7 kilometres (4.3 mi) away from NH 20 Urwan more.
- Tilaiya Dam is 20 kilometres (12 mi) away from Koderma Junction railway station which is situated in Jhumri Telaiya.
- Barhi on NH 19 is 17 kilometres (11 mi) away.

== Education ==
- Kailash Roy Saraswati Vidya Mandir, Jhumri Telaiya
- Sainik School, Tilaiya
