= Koderma Wildlife Sanctuary =

Protected area in Jharkhand, India

- IUCN category IV (habitat/species management area)
- Location within Jharkhand Location within India
- Interactive map of Koderma Wildlife Sanctuary
- Location: Koderma district, Jharkhand, India
- Coordinates: 24°31′N 85°34′E
- Area: 150.62 square kilometres (58.15 sq mi)
- Established: 1985
- Website: http://www.forest.jharkhand.gov.in/

Koderma Wildlife Sanctuary is located in the northern part of Koderma (community development block) in the Koderma subdivision of the Koderma district in the state of Jharkhand, India.

== Geography ==
Cities, towns and locations in Koderma district in North Chotanagpur Division
M: municipality, CT: census town, R: rural/ urban centre, D: dam, P: power plant, T: tourist centre
Owing to space constraints in the small map, the actual locations in a larger map may vary slightly

=== Location ===
Koderma Wildlife Sanctuary is located around 24.541328°N 85.576184°E and is close to the Gautam Budha Wildlife Sanctuary in the Gaya district of Bihar. It is spread over an area of 150.62 square kilometres (58.15 sq mi).

Note: The map alongside presents some of the notable locations in the district. All places marked in the map are linked in the larger full screen map.

== The sanctuary ==
Koderma Forest Division has 150.62 square kilometres (58.15 sq mi) as a reserved forest. The reserved forest area of Koderma district is declared as wild life sanctuary and is under administrative control of wild life division Hazaribagh. Koderma wildlife sanctuary consists of hilly ranges of dry deciduous forests and has plenty of rivulets. The principal trees in the forests are: Sal, Bija, Gamhar, Khair, Palash, Salai, Semal, Bair, Arjun, Karam, Siris, Kaj, Kend, Mahulan, Mahua, Karanj, Ratti etc.

The wildlife includes chital, sambar, barking deer, nilgai, wild boar, jackal, wolf, fox, hyena, leopard, sloth bear, langur, giant squirrel, porcupine etc. besides a variety of bird and reptile species.

There are watch towers at Dwajadhari Pahar, Meghatari and Taraghati. There is a forest rest houses at Meghatari. Koderma has various government and private facilities for fooding and lodging.
