= Karma, Koderma =

Karma
- Census Town
- Location in Jharkhand, India Karma (India)
- Coordinates: 24.444689°N 85.552513°E
- Country: India
- State: Jharkhand
- District: Koderma

Government
  - Type: Gram panchayat

Area
  - Total: 1.82 km^{2} (0.70 sq mi)

Population (2011)
  - Total: 5,753
  - Density: 3,160/km^{2} (8,190/sq mi)

Languages (*For language details see Koderma (community development block)#Language and religion)
  - Official: Hindi, Urdu
- Time zone: UTC+5:30 (IST)
- PIN: 825137
- Telephone/ STD code: 06543
- Vehicle registration: JH 12
- Lok Sabha constituency: Kodarma
- Vidhan Sabha constituency: Kodarma
- Website: koderma.nic.in

Karma is a census town in the Koderma CD block in the Koderma subdivision of the Koderma district in the Indian state of Jharkhand.

== Geography ==
Cities, towns and locations in Koderma district in North Chotanagpur Division
M: municipality, CT: census town, R: rural/ urban centre, D: dam, P: power plant, T: tourist centre
Owing to space constraints in the small map, the actual locations in a larger map may vary slightly

=== Location ===
Karma is located at 24.444689°N 85.552513°E.

=== Overview ===
Koderma district is plateau territory and around 60% of the total area is covered with forests. The first dam of the Damodar Valley Corporation, at Tilaiya was built across the Barakar River and inaugurated in 1953. Koderma Junction railway station has emerged as an important railway centre in the region. It is a predominantly rural district with only 19.72% urban population.

Note: The map alongside presents some of the notable locations in the district. All places marked in the map are linked in the larger full screen map.

== Demographics ==
According to the 2011 Census of India, Karma had a total population of 5,753, of which 2,992 (52%) were males and 2,761 (48%) were females. Population in the age range 0–6 years was 1,089. The total number of literate persons in Karma was 3,479 (74.59% of the population over 6 years).

== Infrastructure ==
According to the District Census Handbook 2011, Kodarma, Karma covered an area of 1.82 km^{2}. Among the civic amenities, it had 15 km roads with both open and closed drains, the protected water supply involved uncovered well, hand pump. It had 733 domestic electric connections, 10 road lighting points. Among the educational facilities it had 1 primary school, 1 middle school, the nearest secondary and senior secondary schools at Jhumri Telaiya 4 km away. It had the branch offices of 4 nationalised banks.

== Education ==
Koderma Medical College is being set up at Karma.

Jhumri Telaiya Commerce College was established in 1984 at Karma. It offers BA (Hons) and B Com courses.
