= Domchanch =

- Census Town
- Location in Jharkhand, India Domchanch (India)
- Coordinates: 24.473056°N 85.689722°E
- Country: India
- State: Jharkhand
- District: Koderma

Government
  - Type: Municipal governance in India
  - Body: Nagar Panchayat Domchanch

Area
  - Total: 11.04 km^{2} (4.26 sq mi)

Population (2011)
  - Total: 15,890
  - Density: 1,439/km^{2} (3,728/sq mi)

Languages (*For language details see Domchanch (community development block)#Language and religion)
  - Official: Hindi, Urdu
- Time zone: UTC+5:30 (IST)
- PIN: 825407
- Telephone/ STD code: 06543
- Vehicle registration: JH 12
- Lok Sabha constituency: Kodarma
- Vidhan Sabha constituency: Kodarma
- Website: koderma.nic.in

Domchanch is a census town in the Domchanch CD block in the Koderma subdivision of the Koderma district in the Indian state of Jharkhand.

== Geography ==
Cities, towns and locations in Koderma district in North Chotanagpur Division
M: municipality, CT: census town, R: rural/ urban centre, D: dam, P: power plant, T: tourist centre
Owing to space constraints in the small map, the actual locations in a larger map may vary slightly

=== Location ===
Domchanch is located at 24.473056°N 85.689722°E.

=== Overview ===
Koderma district is plateau territory and around 60% of the total area is covered with forests. The first dam of the Damodar Valley Corporation, at Tilaiya, was built across the Barakar River and inaugurated in 1953. Koderma Junction railway station has emerged as an important railway centre in the region. It is a predominantly rural district with only 19.72% urban population.

Note: The map alongside presents some of the notable locations in the district. All places marked in the map are linked in the larger full screen map.

== Demographics ==
According to the 2011 Census of India, Domchanch had a total population of 15,890, of which 8,161 (52%) were males and 7,648 (48%) were females. Population in the age range 0–6 years was 2,541. The total number of literate persons in Domchanch was 10,337 (77.91% of the population over 6 years).

== Infrastructure ==
According to the District Census Handbook 2011, Kodarma, Domchanch covered an area of 11.04 km^{2}. Among the civic amenities, it had 24 km roads with open drains, the protected water supply involved uncovered well, hand pump. It had 2,335 domestic electric connections, 30 road lighting points. Among the medical facilities, it had 2 hospitals, 1 dispensary, 1 health centre, 1 family welfare centre, 1 maternity and child welfare centre, 2 TB hospital/ clinics, 5 nursing homes, 1 veterinary hospital, 2 medicine shops. Among the educational facilities it had 2 primary schools, 2 middle schools, 2 secondary schools, 1 senior secondary school, the nearest general degree college at Kodarma 11 km away. Among the social, cultural and recreational facilities, it had 1 stadium. It had the branch offices of 2 nationalised banks, 1 cooperative bank, 1 agricultural credit society.

== Civic administration ==
=== Police station ===
Domchanch police station serves Domchanch CD block.

=== CD block HQ ===
Headquarters of Domchanch CD block is at Domchanch town.

== Transport ==
- There is a station nearby at Maheshpur on the Madhupur-Giridih-Koderma line.
- Jharkhand State Highway 13, passes through domchanch which connect Koderma by Giridih & Dhanbaad
