= Jainagar (community development block) =

- Community development block
- Location in Jharkhand, India Jainagar (India)
- Coordinates: 24°22′33″N 85°38′37″E
- Country: India
- State: Jharkhand
- District: Koderma
- CD block: Jainagar

Government
  - Type: Federal democracy

Area
  - Total: 183.37 km^{2} (70.80 sq mi)
- Elevation: 352 m (1,155 ft)

Population (2011)
  - Total: 131,279
  - Density: 715.92/km^{2} (1,854.2/sq mi)

Languages
  - Official: Hindi, Urdu
- Time zone: UTC+5:30 (IST)
- Telephone/STD code: 06543
- Vehicle registration: JH 12
- Literacy: 67.50%
- Lok Sabha constituency: Kodarma
- Vidhan Sabha constituency: Barkatha
- Website: koderma.nic.in

Jainagar is a community development block (CD block) that forms an administrative division in the Koderma subdivision of the Koderma district, Jharkhand state, India.

== Overview ==
Koderma district occupies the northern end of the Chota Nagpur Plateau. The average altitude is 397 m above sea level. The topography is hilly and the area mostly has laterite soil with patches of clay. Monsoon-dependent agriculture supports the majority of the population. Forest area covers 43% of the total area. Koderma Reserve Forest occupies the northern part of the district. Density of population in the district was 282 persons per km^{2}. Koderma district was once famous for its mica production, but low quality of mica ore and high cost of production led to closure of many units.

== Geography ==
Jainagar is located at 24°22′33″N 85°38′37″E.

The Barakar River flows in the southern part of the district and supports the multi-purpose Tilaiya Dam. Poanchkhara, Keso, Akto, Gurio, Gukhana Nadi are the main tributaries of the Barakar in the district. The Sakri river is the main river in the northern part of the district. Ghggnna Naddi and Chhotanari Nadi are the tributaries of the Sakri river.

Jainagar CD block is bounded by Koderma and Domchanch CD blocks on the north, Markacho CD block on the east, Barkatha CD block in Hazaribagh district on the south and Chandwara CD block on the west.

Jainagar CD block has an area of 183.37 km^{2}. Jainagar police station serves this block. Headquarters of this CD block is at Jainagar village.

Gram Panchayats in Jainagar CD Block are: Beko, Chehal, Chandrapur Dandadih, Gadgi, Gharaunja, Gohal, Hirodih, Jainagar East, Jainagar West, Kakorcholi, Kandrapdih, Kariyawan, Kathadih, Katiya, Khariodih, Naitand, Pipcho, Rupaidih, Satdiha, Tamal, Tetron, Tilokrai and Yogiatilha.

== Demographics ==
=== Population ===
According to the 2011 Census of India, Jainagar CD block had a total population of 131,279, all of which were rural. There were 67,708 (52%) males and 63,571 (48%) females. Population in the age range 0–6 years was 24,519. Scheduled Castes numbered 19,527 (14.87%) and Scheduled Tribes numbered 239 (0.18%).

=== Literacy ===
According to the 2011 census the total number of literate persons in Jainagar CD block was 72,061 (67.50% of the population over 6 years) out of which males numbered 45,117 (82.08% of the male population over 6 years) and females numbered 26,944 (52.02% of the female population over 6 years). The gender disparity (the difference between female and male literacy rates) was 30.06%.

See also – List of Jharkhand districts ranked by literacy rate

Literacy in CD Blocks of
Koderma district
Satgawan – 57.76%
Koderma – 65.74%
Domchanch – 63.52%
Jainagar – 67.50%
Chandwara – 63.75%
Markacho – 64.21%
Source: 2011 Census: CD Block Wise
Primary Census Abstract Data

=== Language and religion ===
Religions in Jainagar CD block (2011)
Religion	Percent
Hinduism	77.89%
Islam	21.84%
Other or not stated	0.27%

Hinduism is the majority religion.

Languages of Jainagar block (2011)
1. Hindi (62.0%)
2. Khortha (30.5%)
3. Urdu (7.28%)
4. Others (0.26%)

The local language is Khortha, which many put as 'Hindi' in the census.

== Rural poverty ==
40-50% of the population of Koderma district were in the BPL category in 2004–2005, being in the same category as Godda, Giridih and Hazaribagh districts. Rural poverty in Jharkhand declined from 66% in 1993–94 to 46% in 2004–05. In 2011, it has come down to 39.1%.

== Economy ==
=== Livelihood ===
Livelihood
in Jainagar CD block
1. Cultivators (39.3%)
2. Agricultural labourers (29.9%)
3. Household industries (2.58%)
4. Other Workers (28.3%)

In Jainagar CD block in 2011, amongst the class of total workers, cultivators numbered 18,573 and formed 39.29%, agricultural labourers numbered 14,118 and formed 29.86%, household industry workers numbered 1,222 and formed 2.58% and other workers numbered 13,360 and formed 28.26%. Total workers numbered 42,273 and formed 36.01% of the total population, and non-workers numbered 84,006 and formed 63.99% of the population.

=== Infrastructure ===
There are 112 inhabited villages in Jainagar CD block. In 2011, 96 villages had power supply. 9 villages had tap water (treated/ untreated), 110 villages had well water (covered/ uncovered), 107 villages had hand pumps, and 2 villages did not have drinking water facility. 17 villages had post offices, 17 villages had sub post offices, 8 villages had telephones (land lines), 66 villages had mobile phone coverage. 109 villages had pucca (paved) village roads, 38 villages had bus service (public/ private), 17 villages had autos/ modified autos 21 villages had taxi/vans and 61 villages had tractors. 7 villages had bank branches, 4 villages had agricultural credit societies, 3 villages had public library and public reading rooms. 48 villages had public distribution system, 14 villages had weekly haat (market), 88 villages had assembly polling stations.

=== Agriculture ===
Large portions of Koderma district are covered with hills and forests, and only 28% of the total area of the district is cultivable land. The soil is acidic and soil erosion is a major problem in the district. Cultivation is the major occupation of the people in the district.

=== Mica mining ===
The mica belt in the northern part of Chota Nagpur Plateau is about 160 km long with an average width of about 25 km. It covers 4,000 square kilometres (1,500 sq mi) in Koderma and Giridih districts of Jharkhand and adjacent areas in Bihar. Mica deposits were discovered in the area in the 1890s, and mica mining developed in a big way. It was exported in large quantities primarily to the Soviet Union. In the 1990s, when the Soviet Union was divided, the countries in the area stopped buying mica from India. It was a major set back for the mica industry. Moreover, the entire mica belt is located in the reserved forests. The forest conservation act was implemented in 1980. When the business was booming almost every household in the mica belt was involved in mica mining. Alternative employment opportunities are rare and so even after formal closing down of the mica mines, almost the entire community in the mica mining belt is involved in illegal mining activities. Mica continues to be in demand locally. It is mainly used in the pigmentation industry for automotive paints and cosmetics. Some other industries also use it. The entire family, including children, are involved in the illegal activity.

=== Thermal Power Station ===
21,483 wagons of coal were transported to Koderma Thermal Power Station at Banjhedih in Jainagar CD block in 2013–14.

=== Backward Regions Grant Fund ===
Koderma district is listed as a backward region and receives financial support from the Backward Regions Grant Fund. The fund, created by the Government of India, is designed to redress regional imbalances in development. As of 2012, 272 districts across the country were listed under this scheme. The list includes 21 districts of Jharkhand.

== Transport ==
The Asansol-Gaya section, a part of the Grand Chord, Howrah-Gaya-Delhi line and Howrah-Allahabad-Mumbai line, passes through this block. There is a railway station at Hirodih on this line.

== Education ==
Jainagar CD block had 62 villages with pre-primary schools, 106 villages with primary schools, 53 villages with middle schools, 15 villages with secondary schools, 5 villages with senior secondary schools, 1 village with non-formal training centre, 5 villages with no educational facility.
.*Senior secondary schools are also known as Inter colleges in Jharkhand

== Healthcare ==
Jainagar CD block had 2 village with primary health centres, 13 villages with primary health subcentres, 5 villages with maternity and child welfare centres, 9 villages with allopathic hospitals, 11 villages with dispensaries, 1 village with veterinary hospital, 2 villages with family welfare centres, 25 villages with medicine shops.
.*Private medical practitioners, alternative medicine etc. not included
