= CUJ =

CUJ may refer to:

== Education ==
- Central University of Jharkhand
- Capital University, Jharkhand

== Other ==
- Consumers Union of Japan
- Critical User Journey, a concept in software user experience design

== See also ==
- Cuvio, a comune in Italy called Cüj in Western Lombard
