= Markacho (community development block) =

- Community development block
- Location in Jharkhand, India Markacho (India)
- Coordinates: 24°19′38″N 85°50′4″E
- Country: India
- State: Jharkhand
- District: Koderma
- CD block: Markacho

Government
  - Type: Federal democracy

Area
  - Total: 228.04 km^{2} (88.05 sq mi)
- Elevation: 398 m (1,306 ft)

Population (2011)
  - Total: 94,419
  - Density: 414.05/km^{2} (1,072.4/sq mi)

Languages
  - Official: Hindi, Urdu
- Time zone: UTC+5:30 (IST)
- PIN: 825318 (Markacho PO)
- Telephone/STD code: 06534
- Vehicle registration: JH-12
- Literacy: 64.21%
- Lok Sabha constituency: Koderma
- Vidhan Sabha constituency: Koderma
- Website: koderma.nic.in

Markacho is a community development block (CD block) that forms an administrative division in the Koderma subdivision of the Koderma district, Jharkhand state, India.

== Overview ==
Koderma district occupies the northern end of the Chota Nagpur Plateau. The average altitude is 397 m (1,302 ft) above sea level. The topography is hilly and the area mostly has laterite soil with patches of clay. Monsoon dependent agriculture supports majority of the population. Forest area covers 43% of the total area. Koderma Reserve Forest occupies the northern part of the district. Density of population in the district was 282 persons per km^{2}. Koderma district was once famous for its mica production but low quality of mica ore and high cost of production led to closure of many units.

== Geography ==
Markacho is located at 24°19′38″N 85°50′4″E. It has an average elevation of 332 metres (1,089 ft).

The Barakar River flows in the southern part of the district and supports the multi-purpose Tilaiya Dam, Panchkhero Dam, Akto, Gurio, Gukhana Nadi are the main tributaries of the Barakar in the district. The Sakri river is the main river in the northern part of the district. Ghggnna Naddi, Chhotanari Nadi are the tributaries of Sakri river.

Markacho CD block is bounded by Gawan CD block, in Giridih district, on the north, Dhanwar and Birni CD blocks, in Giridih district, on the east, Chalkusa CD block, in Hazaribagh district, on the south and Jainagar and Domchanch CD blocks on the west.

Markacho CD block has an area of 228.04 km^{2}.Markacho police station serves this block. Headquarters of this CD block is at Markacho village.

Gram Panchayats in Markacho CD block are: Chopnadih, Dagarnawan, Devepur, Daharokhurd, Jamu, Kadodih, Mahugai, Markacho Middle, Markacho North, Markacho South, Murkmanai, Nawadih, Paplo, Purnanagar, Simariya and Telodih.

== Demographics ==
=== Population ===
According to the 2011 Census of India, Markacho CD block had a total population of 94,419, all of which were rural. There were 46,865 (50%) males and 47,554 (50%) females. Population in the age range 0–6 years was 18,421. Scheduled Castes numbered 10,838 (11.48%) and Scheduled Tribes numbered 2,226 (2.36%).

=== Literacy ===
As of 2011 census, the total number of literate persons in Markacho CD block was 48,796 (64.21% of the population over 6 years) out of which males numbered 29,827 (79.46% of the male population over 6 years) and females numbered 18,969 (49.32% of the female population over 6 years). The gender disparity (the difference between female and male literacy rates) was 30.14%.

See also – List of Jharkhand districts ranked by literacy rate

Literacy in CD Blocks of
Koderma district
Satgawan – 57.76%
Koderma – 65.74%
Domchanch – 63.52%
Jainagar – 67.50%
Chandwara – 63.75%
Markacho – 64.21%
Source: 2011 Census: CD Block Wise
Primary Census Abstract Data

=== Language and religion ===
Religions in Markacho CD block (2011)
Religion	Percent
Hinduism	79.69%
Islam	20.04%
Other or not stated	0.27%

Hinduism is the majority religion. Islam is the second-largest religion.

Languages of Markacho block (2011)
1. Khortha (81.2%)
2. Hindi (15.2%)
3. Santali (2.02%)
4. Urdu (1.29%)
5. Others (0.25%)

The local language is a blend of Khortha and Magahi, which many put as 'Hindi' in the census.

== Rural poverty ==
40-50% of the population of Koderma district were in the BPL category in 2004–2005, being in the same category as Godda, Giridih and Hazaribagh districts. Rural poverty in Jharkhand declined from 66% in 1993–94 to 46% in 2004–05. In 2011, it has come down to 39.1%.

== Economy ==
=== Livelihood ===
Livelihood
in Markacho CD block
1. Cultivators (49.9%)
2. Agricultural labourers (26.5%)
3. Household industries (2.44%)
4. Other Workers (21.2%)

In Markacho CD block in 2011, amongst the class of total workers, cultivators numbered 15,552 and formed 49.92%, agricultural labourers numbered 8,247 and formed 26.47%, household industry workers numbered 759 and formed 2.44% and other workers numbered 6,593 and formed 21.16%. Total workers numbered 31,151 and formed 32.99% of the total population, and non-workers numbered 63,268 and formed 67.01% of the population.

=== Infrastructure ===
There are 100 inhabited villages in Markacho CD block. In 2011, 64 villages had power supply. 14 villages had tap water (treated/ untreated), 100 villages had well water (covered/ uncovered), 97 villages had hand pumps, and all villages had drinking water facility. 12 villages had post offices, 9 villages had sub post offices, 8 villages had telephones (land lines), 40 villages had mobile phone coverage. 100 villages had pucca (paved) village roads, 22 villages had bus service (public/ private), 12 villages had taxi/vans and 37 villages had tractors. 4 villages had bank branches, 9 villages had agricultural credit societies, 2 villages had public library and public reading rooms. 34 villages had public distribution system, 6 villages had weekly haat (market) and 44 villages had assembly polling stations.

=== Agriculture ===
Large portions of Koderma district are covered with hills and forests, and only 28% of the total area of the district is cultivable land. The soil is acidic and soil erosion is a major problem in the district. Cultivation is the major occupation of the people in the district.

=== Mica mining ===
The mica belt in the northern part of Chota Nagpur Plateau is about 160 km long with an average width of about 25 km. It covers 4,000 square kilometres (1,500 sq mi) in Koderma and Giridih districts of Jharkhand and adjacent areas in Bihar. Mica deposits were discovered in the area in the 1890s, and mica mining developed in a big way. It was exported in large quantities primarily to the Soviet Union. In the 1990s, when the Soviet Union was divided, the countries in the area stopped buying mica from India. It was a major set back for the mica industry. Moreover, the entire mica belt is located in the reserved forests. The forest conservation act was implemented in 1980. When the business was booming almost every household in the mica belt was involved in mica mining. Alternative employment opportunities are rare and so even after formal closing down of the mica mines, almost the entire community in the mica mining belt is involved in illegal mining activities. Mica continues to be in demand locally. It is mainly used in the pigmentation industry for automotive paints and cosmetics. Some other industries also use it. The entire family, including children, are involved in the illegal activity.

=== Backward Regions Grant Fund ===
Koderma district is listed as a backward region and receives financial support from the Backward Regions Grant Fund. The fund, created by the Government of India, is designed to redress regional imbalances in development. As of 2012, 272 districts across the country were listed under this scheme. The list includes 21 districts of Jharkhand.

== Transport ==
The 111 km long railway project from Koderma to Giridih costing ₹ 787.87 crore was inaugurated from Koderma to Nawadih on 26 June 2013, by Babulal Marandi, the JVM-P Chief. The state government paid fifty percent of the project cost. Passenger services were started in the fully operational Madhupur-Giridih-Koderma line in 2019.

== Education ==
Markacho CD block had 11 villages with pre-primary schools, 89 villages with primary schools, 39 villages with middle schools, 7 villages with secondary schools, 2 villages with senior secondary schools, 10 villages with no educational facility.
.*Senior secondary schools are also known as Inter colleges in Jharkhand

== Healthcare ==
Markacho CD block had 2 village with primary health centres, 22 villages with primary health subcentres, 4 villages with maternity and child welfare centres, 3 villages with allopathic hospitals, 4 villages with dispensaries, 3 villages with family welfare centres, 22 villages with medicine shops.
.*Private medical practitioners, alternative medicine etc. not included
