= Gumo, Koderma =

Gumo is a village in Koderma district of Jharkhand state of India.
