= Koderma (community development block) =

- Community development block
- Location in Jharkhand, India Koderma (India)
- Coordinates: 24°26′38″N 85°33′4″E
- Country: India
- State: Jharkhand
- District: Koderma
- CD block: Koderma

Government
  - Type: Federal democracy

Area
  - Total: 160.57 km^{2} (62.00 sq mi)
- Elevation: 398 m (1,306 ft)

Population (2011)
  - Total: 93,240
  - Density: 580.7/km^{2} (1,504/sq mi)

Languages
  - Official: Hindi, Urdu
- Time zone: UTC+5:30 (IST)
- PIN: 825410 (Kodarma); 825409 (Jhumri Telaiya); 825137 (Karma)
- Telephone/STD code: 06543
- Vehicle registration: JH-12
- Literacy: 65.74%
- Lok Sabha constituency: Kodarma
- Vidhan Sabha constituency: Kodarma
- Website: koderma.nic.in

Koderma (also spelled as Kodarma) is a community development block (CD block) that forms an administrative division in the Koderma subdivision of the Koderma district, Jharkhand state, India.

== Overview ==
Koderma district occupies the northern end of the Chota Nagpur Plateau. The average altitude is 397 m above sea level. The topography is hilly and the area mostly has laterite soil with patches of clay. Monsoon dependent agriculture supports majority of the population. Forest area covers 43% of the total area. Koderma Reserve Forest occupies the northern part of the district. Density of population in the district was 282 persons per km^{2}. Koderma district was once famous for its mica production but low quality of mica ore and high cost of production led to closure of many units.

== Geography ==
Karma, a constituent town in Koderma CD block, is located at 24°26′38″N 85°33′4″E.

The Barakar River flows in the southern part of the district and supports the multi-purpose Tilaiya Dam. Poanchkhara, Keso, Akto, Gurio, Gukhana Nadi are the main tributaries of the Barakar in the district. The Sakri river is the main river in the northern part of the district. Ghggnna Naddi, Chhotanari Nadi are the tributaries of Sakri river.

Koderma CD block is bounded by Rajauli CD block, in Nawada district of Bihar, on the north, Domchanch CD block on the east, Jainagar CD block on the south and Chandwara CD block on the west.

Kodarma CD block has an area of 160.57 km^{2}.Koderma police station serves this block. Headquarters of this CD block is at Koderma town.

Gram Panchayats in Koderma CD block are: Bekobar (North), Bekobar (South), Charadih, Chhatarbar, Dumardiha, Inderwa, Jarga, Jhumri, Karma, Kauawar Gajhandi, Kharkotta, Kolgarma, Lariyadih, Lokai, Meghatari, Pandedih, Pathaldiha and Purnanagar.

== Demographics ==
=== Population ===
According to the 2011 Census of India, Koderma CD block had a total population of 93,240, of which 80,303 were rural and 12,937 were urban. There were 47,584 (51%) males and 45,656 (49%) females. Population in the age range 0–6 years was 17,645. Scheduled Castes numbered 15,428 (16.55%) and Scheduled Tribes numbered 454 (0.49%).

Bekobar is a census town in Kodarma CD block with a population of 7,184 in 2011 and Karma is a census town with a population of 5,753 in 2011.

=== Literacy ===
As per the 2011 census the total number of literates in Koderma CD Block was 49,695 (65.74% of the population over 6 years) out of which males numbered 30,607 (79.38% of the male population over 6 years) and females numbered 19,088 (51.54% of the female population over 6 years). The gender disparity (the difference between female and male literacy rates) was 27.84%.

Literacy in CD Blocks of
Koderma district
Satgawan – 57.76%
Koderma – 65.74%
Domchanch – 63.52%
Jainagar – 67.50%
Chandwara – 63.75%
Markacho – 64.21%
Source: 2011 Census: CD Block Wise
Primary Census Abstract Data

=== Language and religion ===
Religions in Koderma CD block (2011)
Religion	Percent
Hinduism	85.21%
Islam	13.46%
Jainism	0.46%
Sikhism	0.43%
Other or not stated	0.44%

Hinduism is the majority religion. All minority religions live mainly in urban areas.

Languages of Koderma block (2011)
1. Khortha (45.5%)
2. Hindi (43.7%)
3. Urdu (5.88%)
4. Magahi (2.26%)
5. Others (2.69%)

The local language is a blend of Khortha and Magahi, which many put as 'Hindi' in the census.

== Rural poverty ==
40-50% of the population of Koderma district were in the BPL category in 2004–2005, being in the same category as Godda, Giridih and Hazaribagh districts. Rural poverty in Jharkhand declined from 66% in 1993–94 to 46% in 2004–05. In 2011, it has come down to 39.1%.

== Economy ==
=== Livelihood ===
Livelihood
in Koderma CD block
1. Cultivators (11.7%)
2. Agricultural labourers (11.3%)
3. Household industries (3.73%)
4. Other Workers (73.2%)

In Koderma CD block in 2011, amongst the class of total workers, cultivators numbered 7,268 and formed 11.73%, agricultural labourers numbered 7,029 and formed 11.34%, household industry workers numbered 2,312 and formed 3.73% and other workers numbered 45,374 and formed 73.20%. Total workers numbered 61,983 and formed 30.13% of the total population, and non-workers numbered 153,757 and formed 69.87% of the population.

=== Infrastructure ===
There are 76 inhabited villages in Koderma CD block. In 2011, 67 villages had power supply. 13 villages had tap water (treated/ untreated), 76 villages had well water (covered/ uncovered), 73 villages had hand pumps, and all villages had drinking water facility. 8 villages had post offices, 9 villages had sub post offices, 6 villages had telephones (land lines), 35 villages had mobile phone coverage. 76 villages had pucca (paved) village roads, 16 villages had bus service (public/ private), 17 villages had autos/ modified autos, 18 villages had taxi/vans, 39 villages had tractors. 3 villages had bank branches. 32 villages had public distribution system, 5 villages had weekly haat (market) and 41 villages had assembly polling stations.

=== Agriculture ===
Large portions of Koderma district are covered with hills and forests, and only 28% of the total area of the district is cultivable land. The soil is acidic and soil erosion is a major problem in the district. Cultivation is the major occupation of the people in the district.

=== Mica mining ===
The mica belt in the northern part of Chota Nagpur Plateau is about 160 km long with an average width of about 25 km. It covers 4,000 square kilometres (1,500 sq mi) in Koderma and Giridih districts of Jharkhand and adjacent areas in Bihar. Mica deposits were discovered in the area in the 1890s, and mica mining developed in a big way. It was exported in large quantities primarily to the Soviet Union. In the 1990s, when the Soviet Union was divided, the countries in the area stopped buying mica from India. It was a major set back for the mica industry. Moreover, the entire mica belt is located in the reserved forests. The forest conservation act was implemented in 1980. When the business was booming almost every household in the mica belt was involved in mica mining. Alternative employment opportunities are rare and so even after formal closing down of the mica mines, almost the entire community in the mica mining belt is involved in illegal mining activities. Mica continues to be in demand locally. It is mainly used in the pigmentation industry for automotive paints and cosmetics. Some other industries also use it. The entire family, including children, are involved in the illegal activity.

=== Backward Regions Grant Fund ===
Koderma district is listed as a backward region and receives financial support from the Backward Regions Grant Fund. The fund, created by the Government of India, is designed to redress regional imbalances in development. As of 2012, 272 districts across the country were listed under this scheme. The list includes 21 districts of Jharkhand.

== Education ==
Koderma CD block had 19 villages with pre-primary schools, 62 villages with primary schools, 34 villages with middle schools, 10 villages with secondary schools, 13 villages with no educational facility.

== Healthcare ==
Koderma CD block had 12 villages with primary health subcentres, 3 villages with maternity and child welfare centres, 3 villages with allopathic hospitals, 5 villages with dispensaries, 1 village with veterinary hospital, 27 villages with medicine shops.
.*Private medical practitioners, alternative medicine etc. not included
