= Koderma subdivision =

- Subdivision
- Location in Jharkhand, India Koderma subdivision (India)
- Coordinates: 24.47°N 85.6°E
- Country: India
- State: Jharkhand
- District: Koderma
- Headquarters: Kodarma

Government
  - Type: Federal democracy

Area
  - Total: 2,540 km^{2} (980 sq mi)

Population
  - Total: 716,259
  - Density: 282/km^{2} (730/sq mi)

Languages
  - Official: Hindi, Urdu
- Time zone: UTC+5:30 (IST)
- Website: koderma.nic.in

Koderma subdivision is the only administrative subdivision in the Koderma district in the North Chotanagpur division in the state of Jharkhand, India.

== History ==
Koderma sub-division was created in Hazaribagh district in 1973 and on 10 April 1994, it was made a full-fledged district.

== Administrative set up ==
The district is headed by a Deputy commissioner(DC), who is assisted by a number of officers. Koderma subdivision continues to function with six community development blocks: Koderma, Jainagar, Markacho, Satgawan, Chandwara and Domchanch. Two statutory towns are: Koderma and Jhumri Telaiya. Three census towns are: Bekobar, Karma and Domchanch. There are 577 inhabited villages and 122 uninhabited villages.

The details of Koderma subdivision are as follows:

Subdivision	Headquarters	Area km^{2}	Population (2011)	Rural population % (2011)	Urban population % (2011)
Koderma	Kodarma	2,540	716,259	80.28	19.72

Cities, towns and locations in Koderma district in North Chotanagpur Division
M: municipality, CT: census town, R: rural/ urban centre, D: dam, P: power plant, T: tourist centre
Owing to space constraints in the small map, the actual locations in a larger map may vary slightly

== Demographics ==
As per the 2011 Census of India data Koderma subdivision, in Koderma district in 2011, had a total population of 716,259. There were 367,222 (51%) males and 348,037 (49%) females. Scheduled castes numbered 109,003 (15.22%) and scheduled tribes numbered 6,903 (0.96%). Density of population was 282 persons per square km. Literacy rate was 66.84%, male literacy rate was 79.78%, female literacy rate was 53.23%.

See also – List of Jharkhand districts ranked by literacy rate

== Police stations ==
Police stations in Koderma subdivision are at:

1. Koderma P.S.
2. Koderma Mahila P.S.
3. Telaiya P.S.
4. Chandwara P.S.
5. Domchanch P.S.
6. Dhab
7. Jainagar P.S.
8. Markacho P.S.
9. Nawalsahi P.S.
10. Satgawan P.S.
11. Telaiya dam OP

== Blocks ==
Community development blocks in Koderma subdivision are:

CD Block	Headquarters	Area km^{2}	Population (2011)	SC %	ST %	Literacy rate %	CT
Koderma	Kodarma	160.57	93,240	16.55	0.49	65.74	Bekobar, Karma
Chandwara	Chandwara	232.05	84,914	19.74	0.66	63.75	-
Domchanch	Domchanch	325.30	125,387	13.99	1.88	63.52	Domchanch
Jainagar	Jainagar	183.37	131,279	14.87	0.18	67.50	-
Markacho	Markacho	228.04	94,419	11.48	2.36	64.21	-
Satgawan	Satgawan	303.86	74,520	22.53	0.51	57.76	-

== Education ==
In 2011, Koderma subdivision out of a total 577 inhabited villages there were 168 villages with pre-primary schools, 496 villages with primary schools, 245 villages with middle schools, 52 villages with secondary schools, 11 villages with senior secondary schools, 3 villages with general degree colleges, 3 villages with non-formal training centres, 77 villages with no educational facility.
.*Senior secondary schools are also known as Inter colleges in Jharkhand

=== Educational institutions ===
The following institutions are located in Koderma subdivision:

- Capital University is a private university established in 2018 at Kodarma.
- Jharkhand Vidhi Mahavidyalaya was established at Jhumri Telaiya, Koderma in 2003. It offers 3 years LlB course and 5 years BA+LlB course.
- Jagannath Jain College was established at Jhumri Telaiya in 1960. It offers courses in arts, science, commerce and education.
- Ramgovind Institute of Technology was established at Kodarma in 2002. It is a private engineering degree college.
- Koderma Medical College is being set up at Karma.
- Jhumri Telaiya Commerce College was established in 1984 at Karma. It offers BA (Hons) and B Com courses.

== Healthcare ==
In 2011, in Koderma subdivision there were 9 villages with primary health centres, 121 villages with primary health subcentres, 72 villages with maternity and child welfare centres, 43 villages with allopathic hospitals, 86 villages with dispensaries, 51 villages with veterinary hospitals, 56 villages with family welfare centres, 101 villages with medicine shops.
.*Private medical practitioners, alternative medicine etc. not included
