= Jhumri Telaiya =

Jhumri Telaiya Jhumri Tilaiya / Talaiya
- City
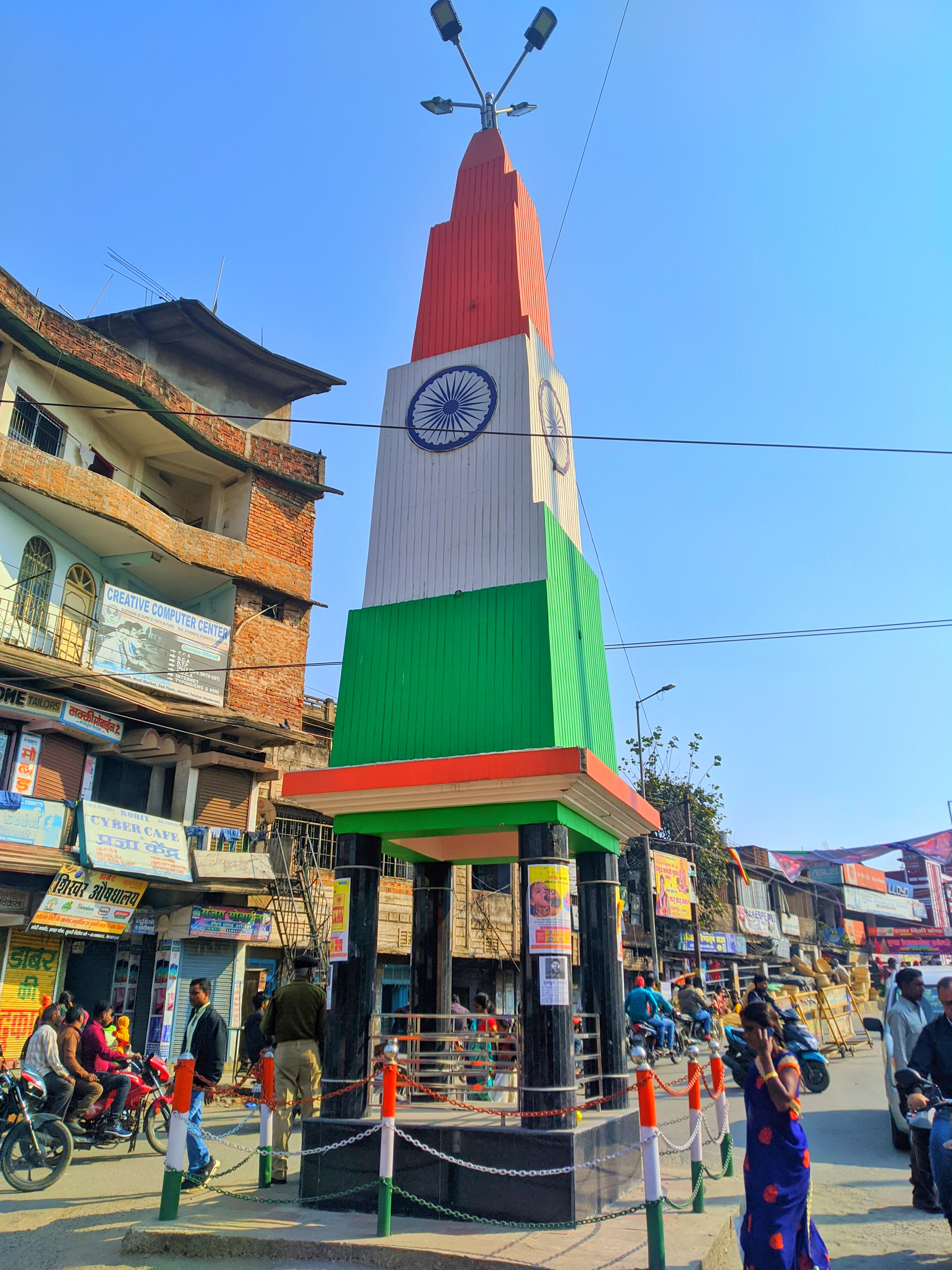

- Location in Jharkhand, India Jhumri Telaiya (India)
- Coordinates: 24.42894°N 85.53547°E
- Country: India
- State: Jharkhand
- District: Koderma
- Tehsil: Koderma
- Wards: 28

Government
  - Type: Municipal governance in India (Municipal council)
  - Body: Jhumri Telaiya Municipal Council (Nagar Parishad)
- Elevation: 383 m (1,257 ft)

Population (2011)
  - Total: 87,867

Languages
  - Official: Hindi, English, Urdu
- Time zone: UTC+5:30 (IST)
- Postal Index Number: 825409
- STD Code: 6534
- ISO 3166 code: IN-JH
- Vehicle registration: JH-12
- Website: koderma.nic.in

Jhumri Telaiya (also spelled as Jhumri Tilaiya or Jhumri Talaiya) is a city in the Koderma subdivision of the Koderma District of Jharkhand, India. Jhumri Telaiya is also the most populus city in the Koderma District.

== Etymology ==
Jhumri is the name of the original village in the area, which has now become a neighbourhood of the city. The word "Telaiya" is the Hindi language word for a small lake (the Tilaiya Dam reservoir). Taal in Sanskrit means lake. Jhumari is also said to be a local folk dance. Jhumri may also stem from Jhoomar, similar to Jhumka, an ornamental earring.

== History ==
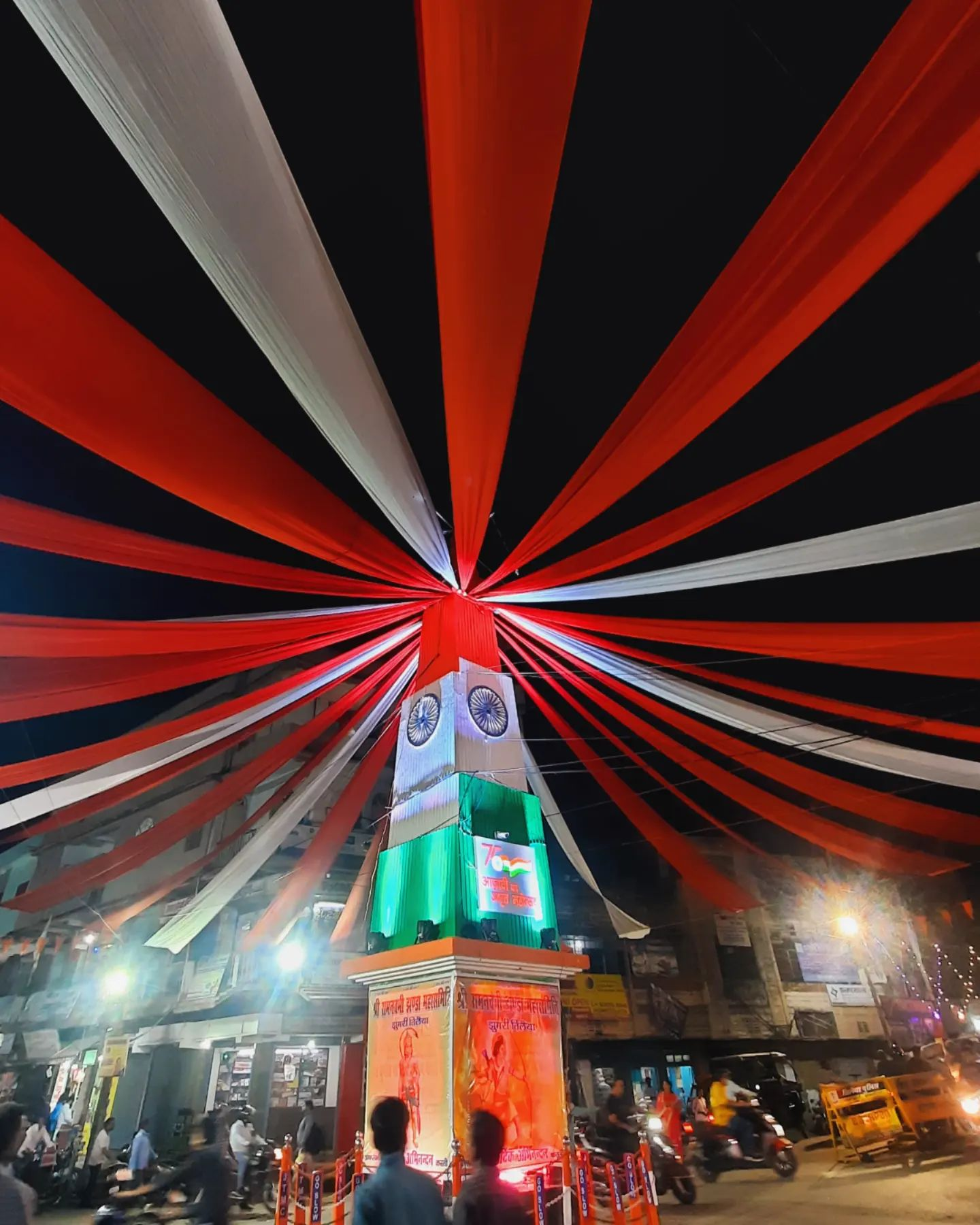
Jhanda Chowk

Jhumri Telaiya was once a major mica mining center. While laying a railroad through Kodarma in the 1890s, the British first discovered vast mica deposits in the region. Mining started soon after and many mining houses were established:

- C. H. Private Limited of Chattu Ram Bhadani and Horil Ram Bhadani and
- Birdhichand Bansidhar of Late Shree Lal Khatuwala

were some of the top firms which operated in the area. The city once boasted of the highest number of phone connections and phone calls made in India. Most of the mica business was moved to government-owned corporations during 1973 - 1974, through a government venture called Bihar Mica Syndicate, which had mica mines in Sapahi, 40 km from Jhumri Telaiya. This government venture was renamed to Bihar State Mineral Development Corporation (BSMDC) and is now known as Jharkhand State Mineral Development Corporation. Most of the mica used to be exported to the USSR, for space and military equipment. The first firm to export mica was Birdhichand Bansidhar and later they set up their offices in Hong Kong, Taiwan, Singapore, Sri Lanka, etc. With the dissolution of the USSR and the discovery of a synthetic substitute for mica, the mining activity declined in the 1990s.

The city was earlier a part of Hazaribagh district and was transferred to the newly created Koderma district on 10 April 1994. Originally a part of the state of Bihar, Jhumri Telaiya became part of the newly formed Jharkhand state in 2000. On 8 December 2008, the Jhumri Telaiya Municipality was declared as a minor urban area.

=== Association with Vividh Bharati ===
Originally a little-known town, Jhumri Telaiya became famous in India in the 1950s owing to its connection with the radio channels Radio Ceylon/ Sri Lanka Broadcasting Corporation (SLBC) and Vividh Bharati (a nationally broadcast radio service of the All India Radio). At a time when television and FM radio had not yet come to India, these afore-mentioned radio channels and their film-song-request programs were a national phenomenon. The largest number of requests from all over India for playing film songs addressed to these radio channels came from Jhumri Telaiya.

The trend started in the early 1950s, when a mica businessman named Rameshwar Prasad started mailing 20 - 25 film-song-requests to Radio Ceylon per day. Regularly hearing Barnwal's name on the radio inspired the paan-shop owner Ganga Prasad Magadhiya and electronics shop owner Nandlal Sinha to similarly mail a large number of song requests. The growing fame of these three Jhumri Telaiya residents led to the emergence of a song-request fad among the people of the town. Young listeners from the town would compete among themselves to send out the most song requests in a day or month. The radio listeners thus became familiar with the town of Jhumri Telaiya. In the 1980s, a radio listeners' club was formed in the town. Subsequently, other towns also started competing with Jhumari Telaiya by sending out large numbers of song requests. The fad declined as television gained popularity, and postal costs increased. Because of a large number of song requests and the town's unusual name, many listeners of Radio Ceylon/ Sri Lanka Broadcasting Corporation and Vividh Bharti doubted its existence. Thus, "Jhumri Talaiya" came to be associated with any lesser-known or insignificant place. This reference is found in several Hindi movies and songs. For example, the movie Mounto (1975) features a song titled Mein To Jhumri Talaiya Se Aeyee Hoon ("I've come from Jhumri Talaiya"). In the film Sooryavansham, starring Amitabh Bachchan as a bus conductor, he issues a ticket to Jhumri Telayia.

== Geography ==
Cities, towns and locations in Koderma district in North Chotanagpur Division
M: municipality, CT: census town, R: rural/ urban centre, D: dam, P: power plant, T: tourist centre
Owing to space constraints in the small map, the actual locations in a larger map may vary slightly

=== Location ===
Jhumri Telaiya is located in the Damodar River valley, North Chotanagpur Division. It has an average elevation of 383 m (1,257 ft). It is situated about eight kilometres from Koderma. Both the towns are closely linked.some day going to be one big urban zone in Jharkhand. The entire town is divided by the grand cord line of Eastern Railway, which passes through the middle of the town.

It is situated in the Damodar Valley. Alternative English transliterations of the town's name include Jhumri Tilaiya, Jhumari Talaiya, and Jhumari Tilaiya.

The Tilaiya Dam reservoir is located near the town. The dam was the first dam and hydro-electric power station constructed by the Damodar Valley Corporation across the Barakar River.

Places of interest near Jhumri Telaiya include Rajgir, Nalanda, Bodhgaya, Hazaribag Wildlife Sanctuary, Padma Palace, Sonbhandar Caves (rumored to have hidden Mauryan treasures), Dhwajadhari Hill, Satagawan Petro falls, the tomb of Sant Paramhans Baba at Domchanch, Makamaro Hills, Itkhori and Shaktipeeth Maa Chanchala Devi. There is a famous temple on a hillock named Chanchal Pahad (Pahad means hill in Hindi). It was known for hot springs in the past. Though the springs have dried now, the temple is still popular for Hindu rituals.

== Administration ==
- Jhumri Telaiya is situated in the Koderma Block in Koderma tehsil of the Koderma district.
- The Police Station is Telaiya P.S.
- The PIN code of Jhumri Telaiya is 825409.

== Transport ==
=== Roadways ===
- Buses, jeeps and three-wheelers connect Jhumri Telaiya with nearby towns and villages. The town is accessible via the National Highway 20 (NH 20), which is also known as Ranchi - Patna Road.
- Jhumri Telaiya is located 23 km away from Grand Trunk Road (NH 19).

=== Railways ===
- Koderma Junction railway station in Jhumri Telaiya is on the Grand Chord railway line of East Central Railway, connecting Howrah to Delhi via Dhanbad. Through it, the town is well connected to several of the major Indian cities including: Delhi, Kolkata, Mumbai, Ranchi, Patna, Jamshedpur, Ujjain, Ahmedabad, Indore, Harda, Bhopal, Lucknow, Varanasi, Ajmer, Amritsar and Bhubaneswar. Three other lines which make it a junction are:
  - Koderma–Hazaribagh–Barkakana–Ranchi line
  - Madhupur–Giridih–Koderma line
  - Koderma Tilaiya line (under construction) by which Koderma junction is directly connected with:Rajgir, Nawada, Biharsharif and also a new route of Patna.

=== Airways ===
- Gaya Airport is the nearest airport (is situated 106 km away from the town).
- Birsa Munda Airport, Ranchi (is situated 159 Km away from the town).
- Jay Prakash Narayan Airport, Patna, is the capital of Bihar state (is situated 187 km away from the town).

== Industries ==
Although the mica mining activity has declined, Jhumri Telaiya still remains an important mica center in the Koderma-Hazaribagh Industrial Area, according to a 2008 IBEF report. Telaiya has become incubator for small scale industries because of its proximity to easy access to minerals, good road-rail connectivity and good power infrastructure (due to the Damodar Valley Corporation sub station).

The region is a Ranchi Industrial Area Development Authority (RIADA) industrial area, which has hand pump and mica powder manufacturing units. Telaiya has numerous sponge iron plants and mica units. The Telaiya Ultra Mega Power Project (UMPP) is an upcoming coal-based power in the Hazaribagh district, not far away from Jhumri Telaiya. The Koderma Thermal Power station at Banjhedih is another power plant in the area.

On the banking sector, many national and private banks are available including State Bank of India, Union Bank of India, Bank of Baroda, Bank of India, United Bank of India, Allahabad Bank, ICICI Bank, HDFC Bank etc. along with their ATMs.

== Demographics ==
As per 2011 Census of India Jhumri Telaiya Nagar Parishad had a total population of 87,867, of which 45,903 were males and 41,963 females. Scheduled Castes numbered 4,601 and Scheduled Tribes numbered 197.

As of 2001 India census, Jhumri Telaiya had a population of 69,444. Males constitute 53% of the population and females 47%. Jhumri Teliya has an average literacy rate of 62%, higher than the national average of 59.5%: male literacy is 72%, and female literacy is 52%. In Jhumri Teliya, 16% of the population is under 6 years of age. Khortha is the major language spoken in the town. Apart from this Hindi, Urdu, Bhojpuri, Punjabi, Bengali, Marwari, and English are also spoken by people in this town.

== Literacy ==
As per 2011 census the total number of literates in Jhumri Telaiya Nagar Parishad was 60,076, out of which 34,398 were males and 25,678 were females.

== Education ==
The town had no school until 1940. Chattu Ram & Horil Ram Pvt limited (CH Pvt limited) family is credited to establish the first school in the town. The great business house employed thousands of employees, whose children were facining immense difficulties as there was no educational institution in the town and nearby districts. On seeing the difficulty of the workers the visioniery directors of the CH family Chattu Ram Bhadani and Darshan Bhadani laid the foundation of schools. Large chunk of land were donated and Chattu Ram Horil Ram High school (CH high school), Chattu Ram Darshan Ram Girls School(CD girls school) were established. For many years these schools were run under the trusteeship of CH family.

Currently there are over 25 schools in and around Jhumri Telaiya, including

- PVSS D.A V. Public School
- Jawahar Navodaya Vidyalaya
- Sainik School, Tilaiya
- C D Girls High School, Jhumri Telaiya
- Grizzly Vidyalaya
- Iqra Public School
- Modern public school, Telaiya
- Sacred Heart School, Telaiya
- Saraswati Shishu Mandir, Telaiya
- UPGRADED HIGH SCHOOL JHUMRI

The colleges in the town include:

- Capital University, Jharkhand
- Jharkhand Vidhi Mahavidyalaya
- Ram Lakhan Singh Yadav College
- Cambridge Teacher Training College, Telaiya
- Chatthuram Horilram Intermediate College (CH+2 College)
- Grizzly College of Education
- Jagannath Jain College (JJ College)
- Jharkhand Teachers Training College (B.Ed. College)
- Jhumri Telaiya Commerce College, Karma
- Ramgovind Group of Colleges
  - Ramgovind Institute of Technology, (B.Tech. engineering College)
  - Ramgovind Polytechnic Institute, (diploma engineering college)

There are also industrial training institutes and other vocational training centres in the town.
