= Chandwara (community development block) =

- Community development block
- Location in Jharkhand, India Chandwara (India)
- Coordinates: 24°23′42″N 85°29′4″E
- Country: India
- State: Jharkhand
- District: Koderma
- CD block: Chandwara

Government
  - Type: Federal democracy

Area
  - Total: 232.05 km^{2} (89.60 sq mi)
- Elevation: 398 m (1,306 ft)

Population (2011)
  - Total: 84,914
  - Density: 365.93/km^{2} (947.75/sq mi)

Languages
  - Official: Hindi, Urdu
- Time zone: UTC+5:30 (IST)
- PIN: 825409
- Telephone/STD code: 06543
- Vehicle registration: JH 12
- Literacy: 63.75%
- Lok Sabha constituency: Hazaribagh
- Vidhan Sabha constituency: Barhi
- Website: koderma.nic.in

Chandwara is a community development block (CD block) that forms an administrative division in the Koderma subdivision of the Koderma district, Jharkhand state, India.

The block is very rural, like much of the rest of Koderma district. It was home to 84,914 people as of 2011 (many of whom are cultivators or agricultural labourers), who are divided between 75 villages. The Barakar River flows through this block.

== Overview ==
Koderma district occupies the northern end of the Chota Nagpur Plateau. The average altitude is 397 m above sea level. The topography is hilly and the area mostly has laterite soil with patches of clay. Monsoon dependent agriculture supports majority of the population. Forest area covers 43% of the total area. Koderma Reserve Forest occupies the northern part of the district. Density of population in the district was 282 persons per km^{2}. Koderma district was once famous for its mica production but low quality of mica ore and high cost of production led to closure of many units.

== Geography ==
Chandwara is located at 24°23′42″N 85°29′4″E.

The Barakar River flows in the southern part of the district and supports the multi-purpose Tilaiya Dam. Poanchkhara, Keso, Akto, Gurio, Gukhana Nadi are the main tributaries of the Barakar in the district. The Sakri river is the main river in the northern part of the district. Ghggnna Naddi, Chhotanari Nadi are the tributaries of Sakri river.

Chandwara CD block is bounded by Rajauli CD block, in Nawada district of Bihar, on the north, Koderma and Jainagar CD blocks on the east, Barhi CD block, in Hazaribagh district on the south and Chauparan CD block, in Hazaribagh district, on the west.

Chandwara CD block has an area of 232.05 km^{2}. Chandwara police station serves this block. Headquarters of this CD block is at Chandwara village.

Gram Panchayats in Chandwara CD Block are: Aragaro, Badkidhamrai, Bendi, Bhondo, Birsodih, Chandwara East, Chandwara West, Kanko, Kanti, Khandi, Madangundi, Pathalgada, Pipradih, Tham and Urwan.

== Demographics ==
=== Population ===
According to the 2011 Census of India, Chandwara CD block had a total population of 84,914, all of which were rural. There were 43,961 (52%) males and 40,953 (48%) females. Population in the age range 0–6 years was 15,994. Scheduled Castes numbered 16,763 (19.74%) and Scheduled Tribes numbered 563 (0.66%).

=== Literacy ===
According to the 2011 census, the total number of literate persons in Chandwara CD block was 43,936 (63.75% of the population over 6 years) out of which males numbered 27,432 (76.82% of the male population over 6 years) and females numbered 16,504 (49.69% of the female population over 6 years). The gender disparity (the difference between female and male literacy rates) was 27.13%.

See also – List of Jharkhand districts ranked by literacy rate

Literacy in CD Blocks of
Koderma district
Satgawan – 57.76%
Koderma – 65.74%
Domchanch – 63.52%
Jainagar – 67.50%
Chandwara – 63.75%
Markacho – 64.21%
Source: 2011 Census: CD Block Wise
Primary Census Abstract Data

=== Language and religion ===
Religions in Chandwara CD block (2011)
| Religion | Percent |
| Hinduism | 88.60% |
| Islam | 11.30% |
| Other or not stated | 0.10% |

Hinduism is the majority religion. Islam is the second-largest religion.

Languages of Chandwara block (2011)
1. Khortha (74.4%)
2. Hindi (24.1%)
3. Urdu (1.03%)
4. Others (0.46%)

The local language is a blend of Khortha and Magahi, which many put as 'Hindi' in the census.

== Rural poverty ==
40-50% of the population of Koderma district were in the BPL category in 2004–2005, being in the same category as Godda, Giridih and Hazaribagh districts. Rural poverty in Jharkhand declined from 66% in 1993–94 to 46% in 2004–05. In 2011, it has come down to 39.1%.

== Economy ==
=== Livelihood ===
Livelihood
in Chandwara CD block
1. Cultivators (56.9%)
2. Agricultural labourers (10.4%)
3. Household industries (2.87%)
4. Other Workers (29.8%)

In Chandwara CD block in 2011, amongst the class of total workers, cultivators numbered 26,348 and formed 56.88%, agricultural labourers numbered 4,840 and formed 10.45%, household industry workers numbered 1,329 and formed 2.87% and other workers numbered 13,809 and formed 29.81%. Total workers numbered 46,326 and formed 54.56% of the total population, and non-workers numbered 38,588 and formed 45.44% of the population.

=== Infrastructure ===
There are 75 inhabited villages in Chandwara CD block. In 2011, 51 villages had power supply. 6 villages had tap water (treated/ untreated), 71 villages had well water (covered/ uncovered), 70 villages had hand pumps, and 4 villages did not have drinking water facility. 4 villages had post offices, 4 villages had sub post offices, 5 villages had telephones (land lines) and 25 villages had mobile phone coverage. 70 villages had pucca (paved) village roads, 12 villages had bus service (public/ private), 13 villages had autos/ modified autos, 13 villages had taxi/vans, 36 villages had tractors. 6 villages had bank branches, 5 villages had agricultural credit societies, 1 village had public library and public reading room. 20 villages had public distribution system, 6 villages had weekly haat (market), 42 villages had assembly polling stations.

=== Agriculture ===
Large portions of Koderma district are covered with hills and forests, and only 28% of the total area of the district is cultivable land. The soil is acidic and soil erosion is a major problem in the district. Cultivation is the major occupation of the people in the district.

=== Mica mining ===
The mica belt in the northern part of Chota Nagpur Plateau is about 160 km long with an average width of about 25 km. It covers 4,000 square kilometres (1,500 sq mi) in Koderma and Giridih districts of Jharkhand and adjacent areas in Bihar. Mica deposits were discovered in the area in the 1890s, and mica mining developed in a big way. It was exported in large quantities primarily to the Soviet Union. In the 1990s, when the Soviet Union was divided, the countries in the area stopped buying mica from India. It was a major set back for the mica industry. Moreover, the entire mica belt is located in the reserved forests. The forest conservation act was implemented in 1980. When the business was booming almost every household in the mica belt was involved in mica mining. Alternative employment opportunities are rare and so even after formal closing down of the mica mines, almost the entire community in the mica mining belt is involved in illegal mining activities. Mica continues to be in demand locally. It is mainly used in the pigmentation industry for automotive paints and cosmetics. Some other industries also use it. The entire family, including children, are involved in the illegal activity.

=== Backward Regions Grant Fund ===
Koderma district is listed as a backward region and receives financial support from the Backward Regions Grant Fund. The fund, created by the Government of India, is designed to redress regional imbalances in development. As of 2012, 272 districts across the country were listed under this scheme. The list includes 21 districts of Jharkhand.

== Transport ==
The 79.7 km long first stage railway project from Koderma to Hazaribagh costing Rs. 936 crore was inaugurated by Prime Minister Narendra Modi on 20 February 2015. The railway line passes through this CD block and there are stations at Pipradih and Urwan.

== Education ==
Chandwara CD block had 29 villages with pre-primary schools, 62 villages with primary schools, 35 villages with middle schools, 9 villages with secondary schools, 1 village with senior secondary school, 12 villages with no educational facility.
.*Senior secondary schools are also known as Inter colleges in Jharkhand

== Healthcare ==
Chandwara CD block had 2 village with primary health centres, 6 villages with primary health subcentres, 2 villages with maternity and child welfare centres, 5 villages with allopathic hospitals, 5 villages with dispensaries, 1 village with veterinary hospital, 4 villages with medicine shops.
.*Private medical practitioners, alternative medicine etc. not included
