= Sainik School, Tilaiya =

Indian defence services preparatory school

Sainik School Tilaiya
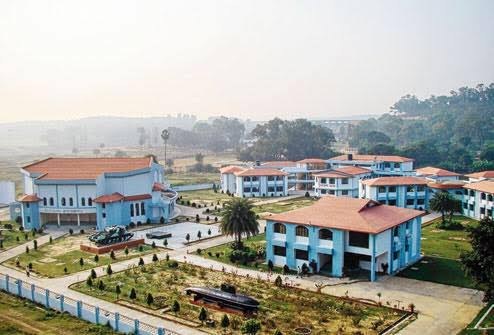

Location
- Sainik School Tilaiya, P.O. Tilaiya Dam; Central Zone; Tilaiya Dam, Koderma, Jharkhand, 825413; India; 24.332°N 85.517°E

Information
- Other names: SST
- School type: Defence Nursery Military Preparatory Institution
- Motto: अग्रे सरत सर्वदा (Forward Ever)
- Established: 16 September 1963
- Founder: Lt. Col LEG Smith
- School board: C.B.S.E.
- Authority: Ministry of Defence, Government of India
- Oversight: Sainik Schools Society
- Principal: Col S Mohanrao R
- Headmaster: Lt. Col Lalnunsiama
- Years offered: VI to XII
- Gender: Boys & Girls
- Enrollment: 850+ (Cadets of SST)
- Language: English
- Campus size: 285 acres (115 ha)
- Houses: 1. Aryabhatta; 2. Ashoka; 3. Gautam; 4. Kunwar Singh; 5. Magadh; 6. Maurya; 7. Mithila; 8. Nalanda; 9. Patliputra; 10. Rajgir; 11. Vaishali; 12. Vikram
- Colors: Red and grey
- Nickname: SSTILAIYA
- Teams: Tilaiyans
- Team name: Tilaiyans
- Yearbook: The Tilaiyans
- Feeder to: National Defence Academy, Indian Naval Academy
- Affiliation: C.B.S.E.
- Website: www.sainikschooltilaiya.org

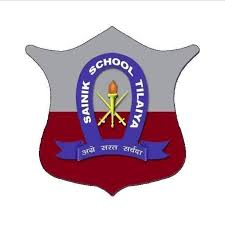
The official emblem of Sainik School, Tilaiya.

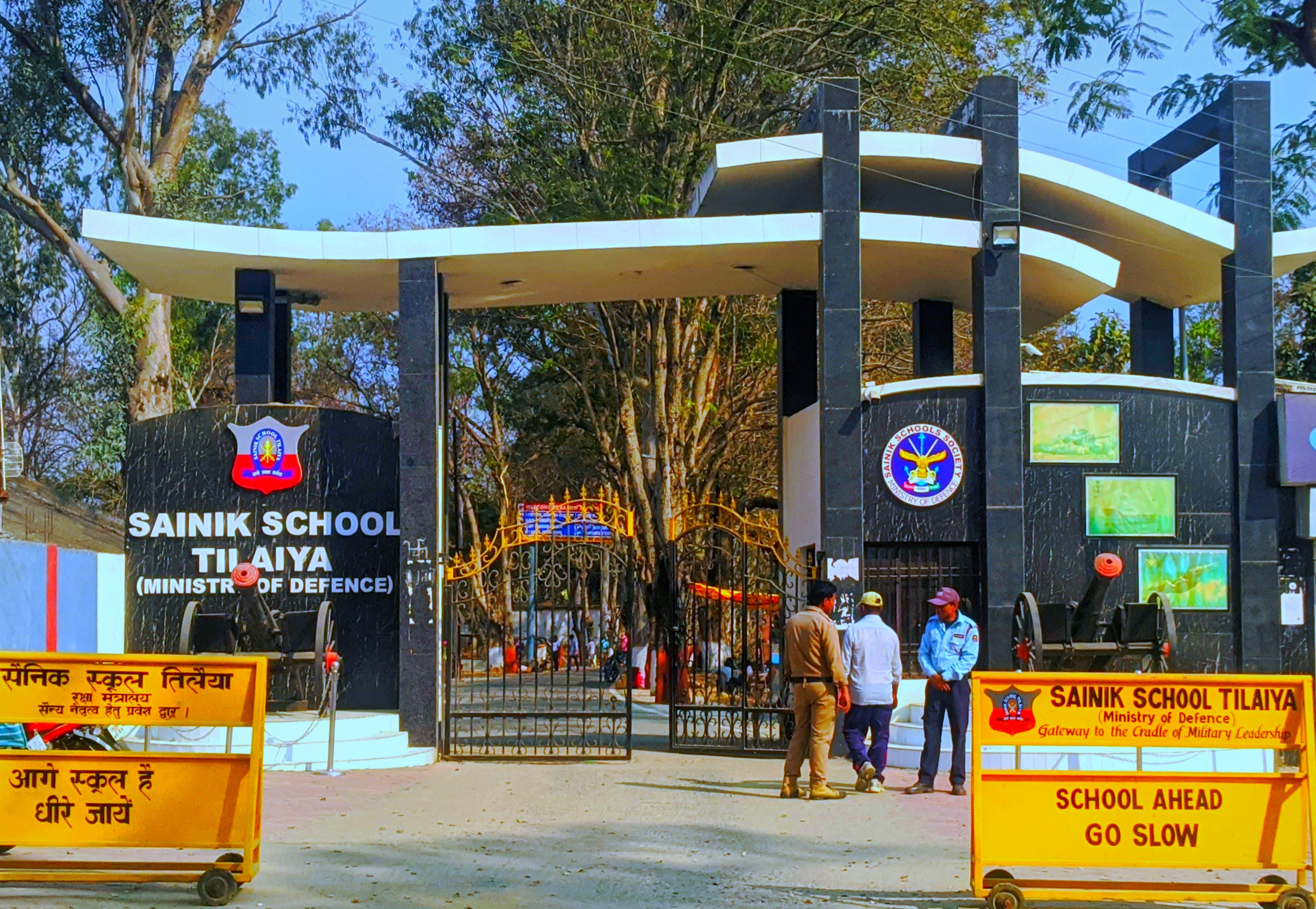
The front gate of Sainik School, Tilaiya.

Sainik School Tilaiya, Jharkhand, India, is a public boarding school established and managed by the Sainik Schools Society under Ministry of Defence. It is a preparatory school for entry into the defence services — National Defence Academy (NDA), Khadakwasla, Pune and Indian Naval Academy (INA), Ezhimala, Kerala.

Honour Code:

"As a Tilaiyan, I will be truthful, trustworthy, honest and forthright under all circumstances. I will not lie cheat, mislead, or deceive anyone. When I commit a mistake I shall honestly own up of my own free will."

== History and location ==
The laying of the foundation stone of Sainik School was on 16 Sept 1963. The school was created by the efforts of the then Union Defence Minister, Late V K Krishna Menon, the then Chief Minister of Bihar, Late K B Sahay and the Principal Lt Col LEG Smith. Today, it is top ranking nursery to the NDA.

Located nearly a kilometre away from Tilaiya dam in the district of Koderma, Sainik School Tilaiya is 18 km (11 mi) from the nearest rail head – Koderma on the Howrah – Delhi chord line nearer to Gaya. The Chhotanagpur Plateau and Tilaiya provide a backdrop to the school.

== Admission ==
Entrance to Sainik School, Tilaiya is competitive and coordinated nationally by the National Testing Agency. Students can apply for admissions in Class VI and Class IX. The written exam in Class VI covers questions on mathematics, English (or Hindi) and mental reasoning. The written exam in Class IX includes science and social sciences as subjects, in addition to mathematics, English and mental reasoning. Selected applicants go through interviews and medical examinations before being offered admissions. The likely number of vacancies in every academic year is 120 for Class VI and 20 for Class IX.

In 2020, Sainik School Tilaiya became one of the five Sainik Schools in the country to welcome girls in the academy. Academic session 2021-22 will have the first girl cadets in the school.

== Notable alumni ==
- Air Marshal Awadhesh Kumar Bharti, AVSM, VM, Deputy Chief of the Air Staff (India), Indian Air force
- Prakash Jha– film producer, actor, director and screenwriter Known Movies (Damul, Mrityudand, Gangaajal, Apaharan, Rajniti)
- Chandrashekhar Prasad – student leader, former president of Jawaharlal Nehru University students' union, whose assassination led to large student protests in India.
- Justice Shiva Kirti Singh - Hon'ble Judge of the Supreme Court of India.
- Manjul Sinha – Indian television director.
- Manish Tiwary – film director (Dil Dosti Etc)
- Shaibal Gupta, Padma Shri – founder member- secretary of Asian Development Research Institute, Patna
- Manoj Kumar, Ministry of Women and Child Development
- Dheeraj Kumar, IAS
- Neeraj Kumar, IPS
- Kumar Gaurav, IFS
- Mahendra Kumar, IAS
- Lt. Gen.(Retd.) Shashank Shekhar Mishra, PVSM, AVSM, VSM, Kumaon Regiment, Indian Army

== Curriculum and life ==
The school resources allow cadets to develop their skills in sports, academics and other extracurricular activities. Sainik School, Tilaiya is famous for emphasis on extracurricular activities. Infrastructure in Sainik Schools include running tracks, cross-country tracks, indoor games, parade grounds, boxing rings, firing ranges, canoeing clubs, horse riding clubs, mountaineering clubs, trekking and hiking club, obstacles courses, football, hockey and cricket fields, as well as volleyball and basketball courts. Cadets also become a part of NCC. A cadet who completes their 12th standard usually possess a NCC B certificate.

The academic instruction imparted at the school prepares cadets (as they are called in the school) for the following examinations:

- All India Secondary School Examination (Class – X),
- All India Senior School Certificate Examination (Class – XII) conducted by the Central Board of Secondary Education, New Delhi under the 10+2 pattern of school education,
- Union Public Service Commission Examination for admission to the National Defence Academy and other Defence Academies,
- Scholarship holders take the NDA Entrance Examination conducted by the Union Public Service Commission during the +2 stage after passing Class XI. Since there is an emphasis on Science Stream in the NDA curriculum, Sainik Schools cater only to the science stream subjects in Classes XI and XII.

Other activities include co-curricular activities and Socially Useful Productive Work, sports and NCC training.

=== House ===
The cadets are arranged into houses which are groups with which they live for seven years. There are twelve houses: Magadh, Gautam, Aryabhatta, Vikram, Patliputra, Vaishali, Kunwar Singh, Mithila, Maurya, Ashoka, Nalanda and Rajgir. There are Inter-House competitions for almost every sport and co-curricular activity which turn fierce at times. At the end of each academic year, the best performing house is awarded "Cock House" trophy. Winning it thrice consequently makes the house "Rooster House". Kunwar Singh house is the only Rooster House as of 2021.

There are two baby houses which host Class-VI cadets for a year when they join: Baidyanath and Parasnath. A new house with name 'Rani Laxmi Bai' has been established for girl cadets.

== Departments ==
- Arts and Crafts
- Biology
- Chemistry
- Computer Science
- English
- Mathematics
- Physics
- Hindi and Sanskrit
- Social Science
