= Koderma district =

Coordinates: 24°28′12″N 85°35′24″E

- District of Jharkhand
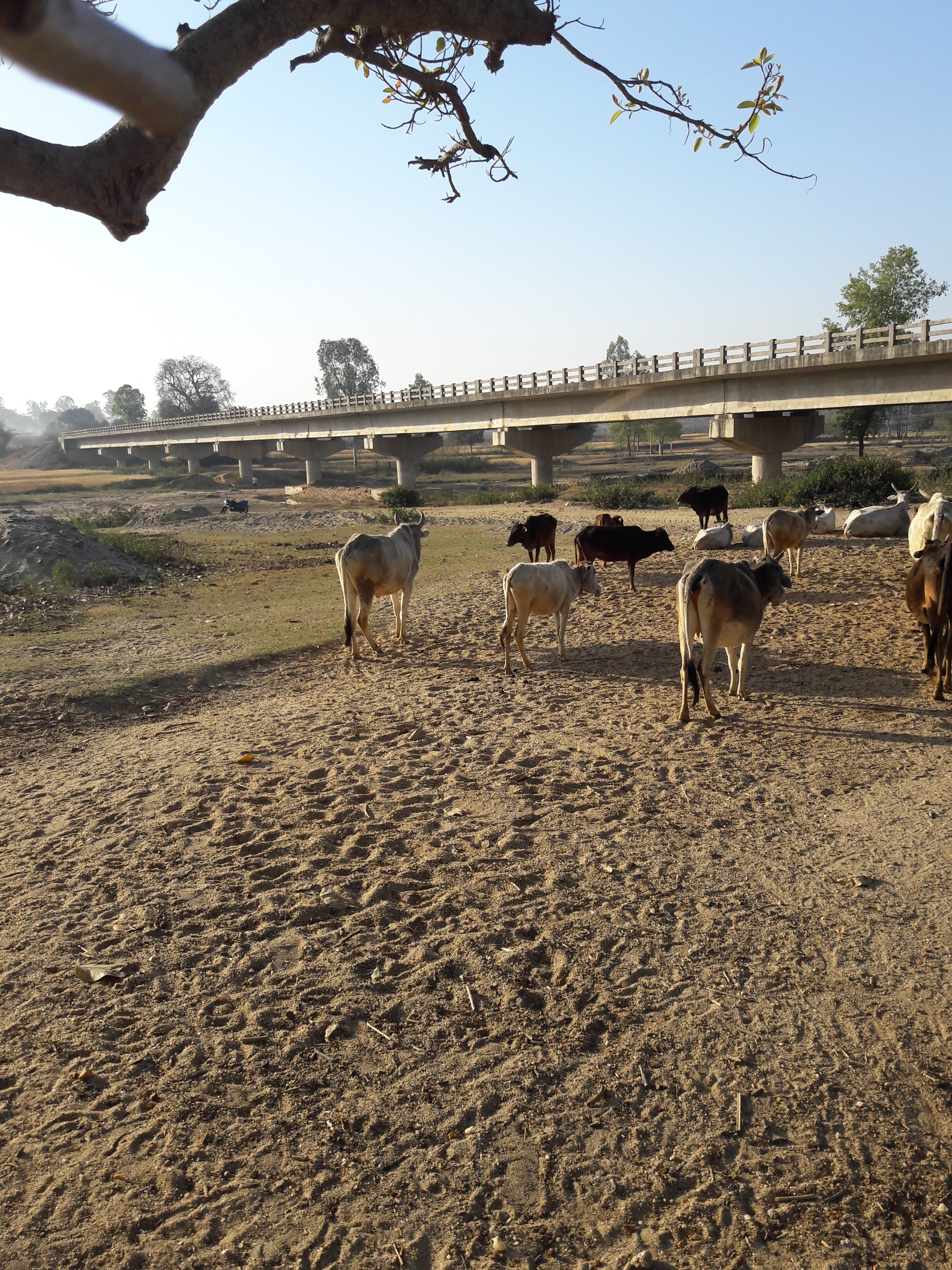
- Interactive map of Koderma district
- Country: India
- State: Jharkhand
- Division: North Chotanagpur
- Established: 1994
- Headquarters: Koderma

Government
  - DC: Shri Utkarsh Gupta (IAS)
  - SP: Shri Kumar Shivashish (IPS)
  - Lok Sabha constituencies: Kodarma (shared with Giridih and Hazaribagh districts)
  - Vidhan Sabha constituencies: Kodarma

Area
  - Total: 1,655.61 km^{2} (639.23 sq mi)

Population (2011)
  - Total: 716,259
  - Density: 432.625/km^{2} (1,120.49/sq mi)

Languages
  - Official: Hindi
  - Additional official: Urdu and English
  - Other: Khortha and Santali

Demographics
  - Literacy: 66.84 per cent
  - Sex ratio: 949
- Time zone: UTC+05:30 (IST)
- Major highways: NH 20
- Railway Station: Koderma Junction
- Website: http://koderma.nic.in/

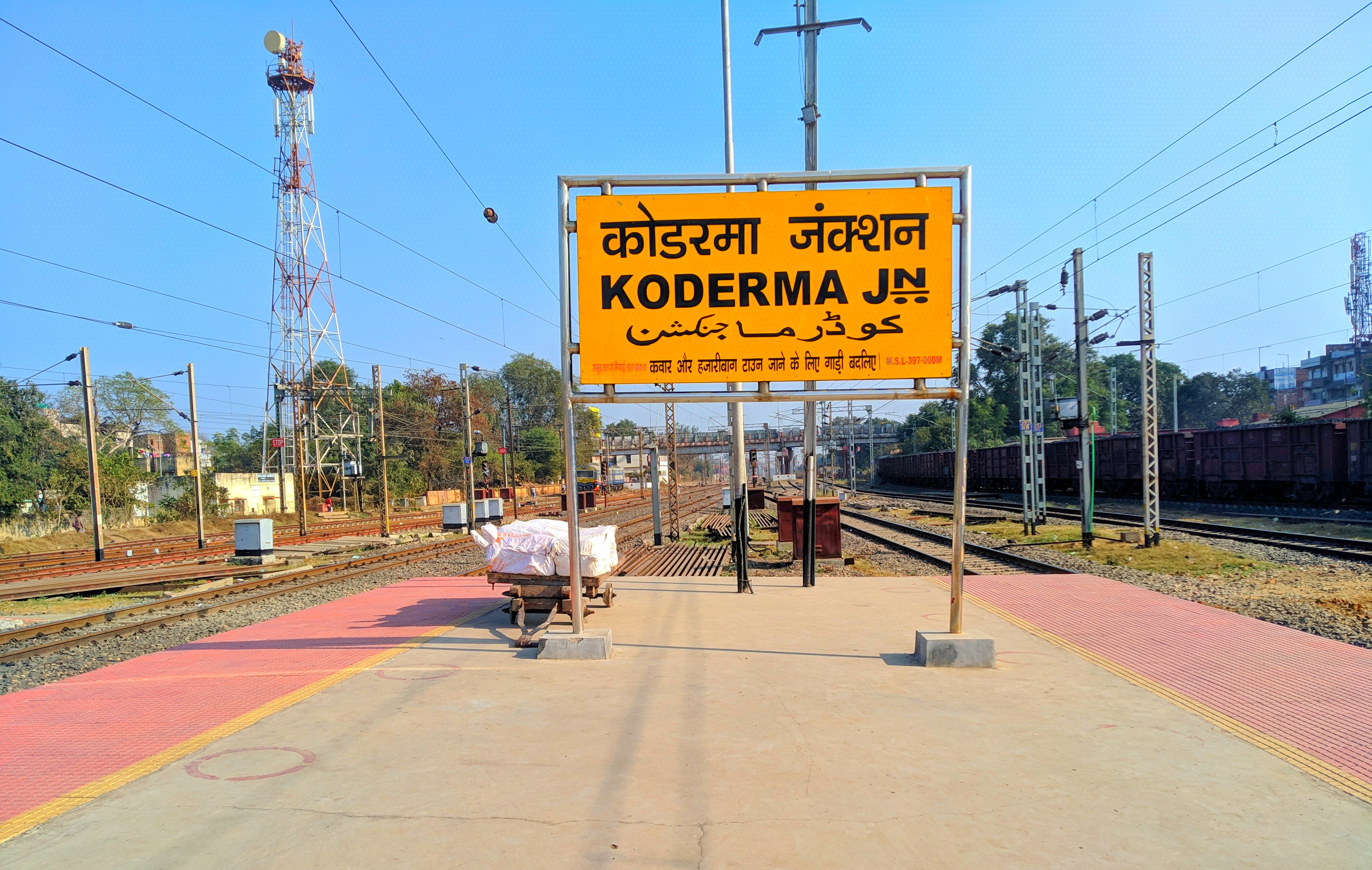
Koderma Junction

Koderma district is one of the twenty-four districts of Jharkhand state, India and Koderma is the administrative headquarters of this district. Jhumri Telaiya is the most populus town of koderma district. It shares border with Hazaribagh & Giridih District of Jharkhand state and Nawada & Gaya District of Bihar state.

== History ==
Koderma district was created on 10 April 1994, after being carved out of the original Hazaribagh district. It is currently a part of the Red Corridor.

== Geography ==
Koderma is bordered by Nawada district of Bihar on the north, the Gaya district of Bihar on the west, the Giridih district of Jharkhand on the east, and the Hazaribagh district of Jharkhand on the south.

Koderma is surrounded by forests. The main rivers of the district are Barakar, Barsoi and Sakri. Dhawajadhari Pahar is a hill dedicated to lord Shiva, where at Mahashivratri many devotees assemble to worship the god. Chanchal dham (hill) which is located 12 km (7.5 mi) from Nawadih railway station and 30 km (19 mi) from Koderma junction railway station, is dedicated to Maa Chanchalni. Many devotees gather here for the festivals of durga pooja, ramnavmi, akhari pooja, etc to worship Chanchalni Maa to fulfill their desires.

Koderma district is richly endowed with natural resources. Quartz, feldspar, asbestos, blue stone, white stone and moon stone are the minerals found here. At one time, Koderma was considered as the mica capital of India.

== Demographics ==
Historical population
Year	Pop.	±% p.a.
1901	110,697	—
1911	121,094	+0.90%
1921	119,998	−0.09%
1931	142,590	+1.74%
1941	164,578	+1.44%
1951	182,045	+1.01%
1961	215,252	+1.69%
1971	268,836	+2.25%
1981	327,035	+1.98%
1991	419,624	+2.52%
2001	540,901	+2.57%
2011	716,259	+2.85%

According to the 2011 census Koderma district has a population of 716,259, roughly equal to the nation of Bhutan or the US state of Alaska. This gives it a ranking of 500th in India (out of a total of 640). The district has a population density of 282 inhabitants per square kilometre (730/sq mi). Its population growth rate over the decade 2001-2011 was 32.59%. Kodarma has a sex ratio of 949 females for every 1000 males, and a literacy rate of 66.84%. 19.72% of the population lives in urban areas. Schedule Castes and Scheduled Tribes make up 15.22% and 0.96% of the population respectively.

Religion in Koderma district (2011)
Religion	Percent
Hinduism	84.49%
Islam	14.94%
Other or not stated	0.57%

84.49% are Hindus while 14.94% are Muslim.

Languages of Koderma district (2011)
1. Khortha (49.7%)
2. Hindi (43.5%)
3. Urdu (4.69%)
4. Others (2.18%)

At the time of the 2011 Census of India, 49.66% of the population in the district spoke Khortha, 43.47% Hindi, 4.69% Urdu and 0.52% Santali as their first language.

== Economy ==
In 2006 the Indian government named Koderma one of the country's 250 most backward districts (out of a total of 640). It is one of the 21 districts in Jharkhand currently receiving funds from the Backward Regions Grant Fund Programme (BRGF).

== Politics ==
Koderma district has one Lok Sabha constituency Kodarma (shared with Giridih and Hazaribagh districts) and one Vidhan Sabha constituency Kodarma.

- MP of Kodarma - Annpurna Devi (BJP)

- MLA of Kodarma - Dr. Neera Yadav (BJP)

District	No.	Constituency	Name	Party	Alliance	Remarks	Koderma	19	Kodarma	Neera Yadav	BJP	NDA

== Administration ==
Koderma district is headed by Deputy Commissioner who is an IAS officer. It consists of one Sub-division and six Blocks.

=== Koderma Sub-division ===
==== Blocks ====
1. Koderma Block
2. Jainagar Block
3. Chandwara Block
4. Markacho Block
5. Domchanch Block
6. Satgawan Block
- Municipalities - 3
- Panchayats - 105
- Villages - 717

== Education ==
There are several schools and degree colleges in Koderma, notable institutions include:

- Capital University, Jharkhand, established by Jharkhand Govt in 2018, in Chitragupta Nagar, Koderma, Jharkhand
- PVSS D.A V. Public School
- Jawahar Navodaya Vidyalaya
- Jharkhand Vidhi Mahavidyalaya
- Kailash Roy Saraswati Vidya Mandir, Jhumri Telaiya (Vidya Bharti Foundation)
- Kendriya Vidyalaya Koderma
- Sainik School, Tilaiya
- Saraswati Shishu Mandir (established 1984), run by the Bal Bharti Samiti of Rashtriya Swayamsevak Sangh

== Transport ==
The district has three major towns - Jhumri Telaiya, Koderma, Domchanch.

=== Roadways ===
- Koderma & Jhumri Telaiya are located along National Highway 20 (NH 20), which connects Ranchi and Patna.
- Jharkhand State Highway 13 which is start from Koderma and passes through Domchanch.

=== Railways ===
- Koderma Junction Railway station is situated in Jhumri Telaiya is on the Grand Chord railway line, which connects Kolkata and Delhi. Three other lines which make it junction are : 1).Koderma–Hazaribagh–Barkakana–Ranchi line, 2).Madhupur–Giridih–Koderma line, 3).Koderma Tilaiya line(under construction)

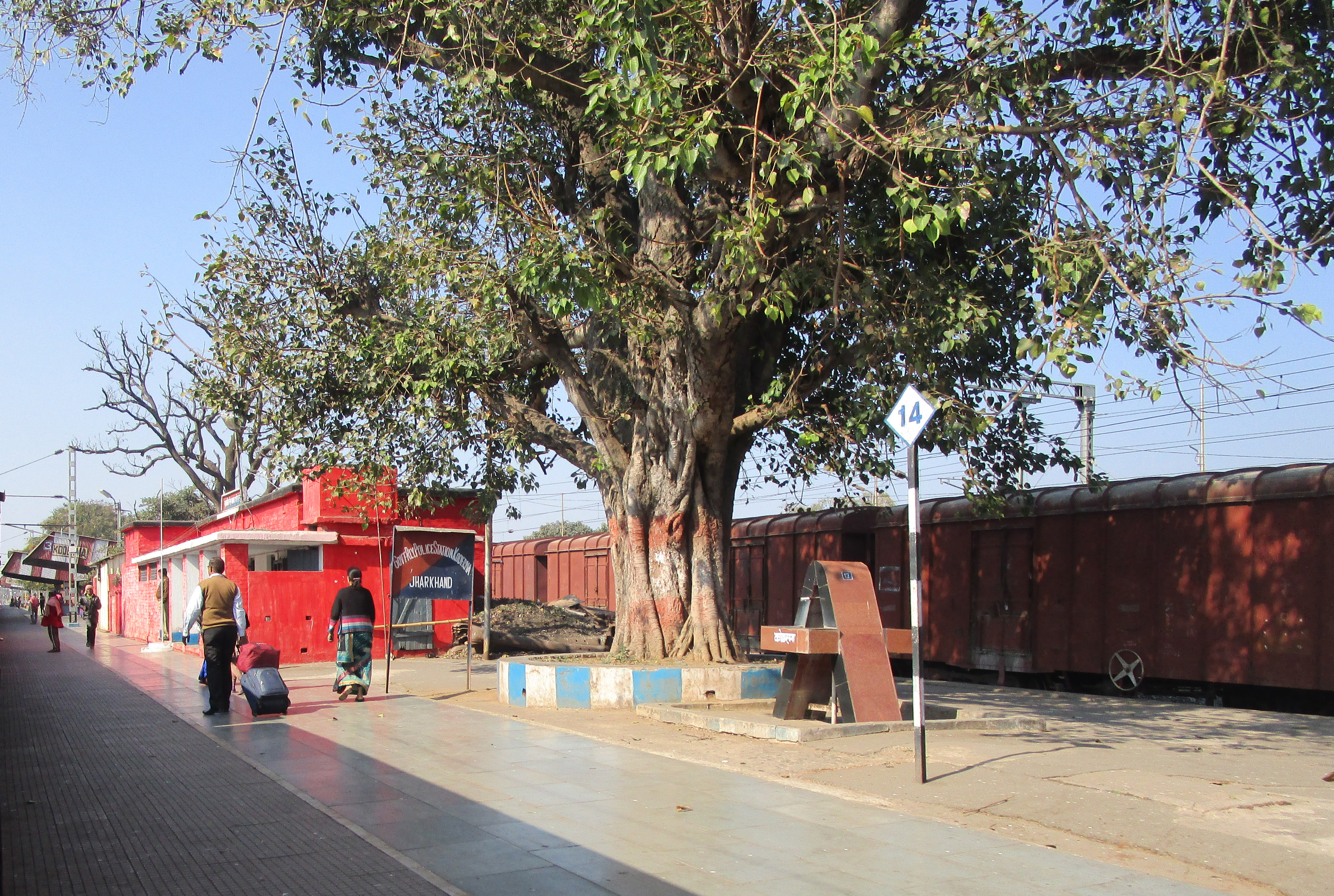
Koderma Railway station platform

== Health ==
=== Hospitals ===
- Sadar Hospital Koderma
  - Primary Health Center Koderma (situated in Jhumri Telaiya)
  - Primary health center Domchanch
  - Primary health center Chandwara
  - Primary health center Jainagar
  - Primary health center Markacho
  - Primary health center Satgawan
- Holy Family Hospital, Koderma
- Rotary Club Eye Clinic, Jhumri Telaiya (Koderma)
- Aryan Hospital, Jhumri Telaiya
- Jay Prakash Hospital, Chitragupt Nagar, Jhumri Telaiya (Koderma)
- Hope hospital, Jhumri Telaiya (Koderma)
- Gayatri Hospital, Jhumri telaiya (Koderma)
- Care Hospital, Jhumri Telaiya (koderma)
- P G Hospital, Karma (Koderma)

== Tourism ==
- Tilaiya Dam
- Koderma Wildlife Sanctuary
