= Capital University, Jharkhand =

Private university in Koderma, India

- University Logo
- Other name: CUJ
- Motto: Education for All
- Type: Private
- Established: 2018; 8 years ago
- Affiliations: UGC, BCI
- Chancellor: Madan Kumar
- Vice-Chancellor: Dr. Pramod Kumar
- Academic staff: 120
- Administrative staff: 180
- Students: 5,000 +
- Postgraduates: 2,000 +
- Location: Koderma, Jharkhand, India; 24.4278229°N 85.5149768°E
- Campus: Suburban
- Website: capitaluniversity.edu.in

Capital University, Jharkhand (CUJ) is a private university located at Koderma, Jharkhand, India. It was established in 2018 by the Ch. Charan Singh Educational Society under the Capital University Act, 2018, following the approval of the Bill by the Jharkhand cabinet in July 2018 and passing the bill in the Jharkhand Legislative Assembly later that month.

== Academics ==
CUJ offers undergraduate and postgraduate degree programs in various disciplines. It has the following academic departments:

- Faculty of Agriculture.
- Faculty of Computer Science.
- Faculty of Engineering.
- Faculty of Business.
- Faculty of journalism.
- Faculty of Management.
- Faculty of Humanities.
- Faculty of Para Medical.
- Faculty of Science.
- Faculty of Social Studies.

== Approvals ==
- University Grants Commission
- Bar Council of India
- All India Council for Technical Education
- Ministry of Railways
- International Human Right Organization
- Wharf Street Strategies
- Indian Council for Agricultural Research
- State Government of Jharkhand

== See also ==
- Education in India
- List of private universities in India
- List of institutions of higher education in Jharkhand
- Education in Jharkhand
