= Kodarma =

Koderma
- City
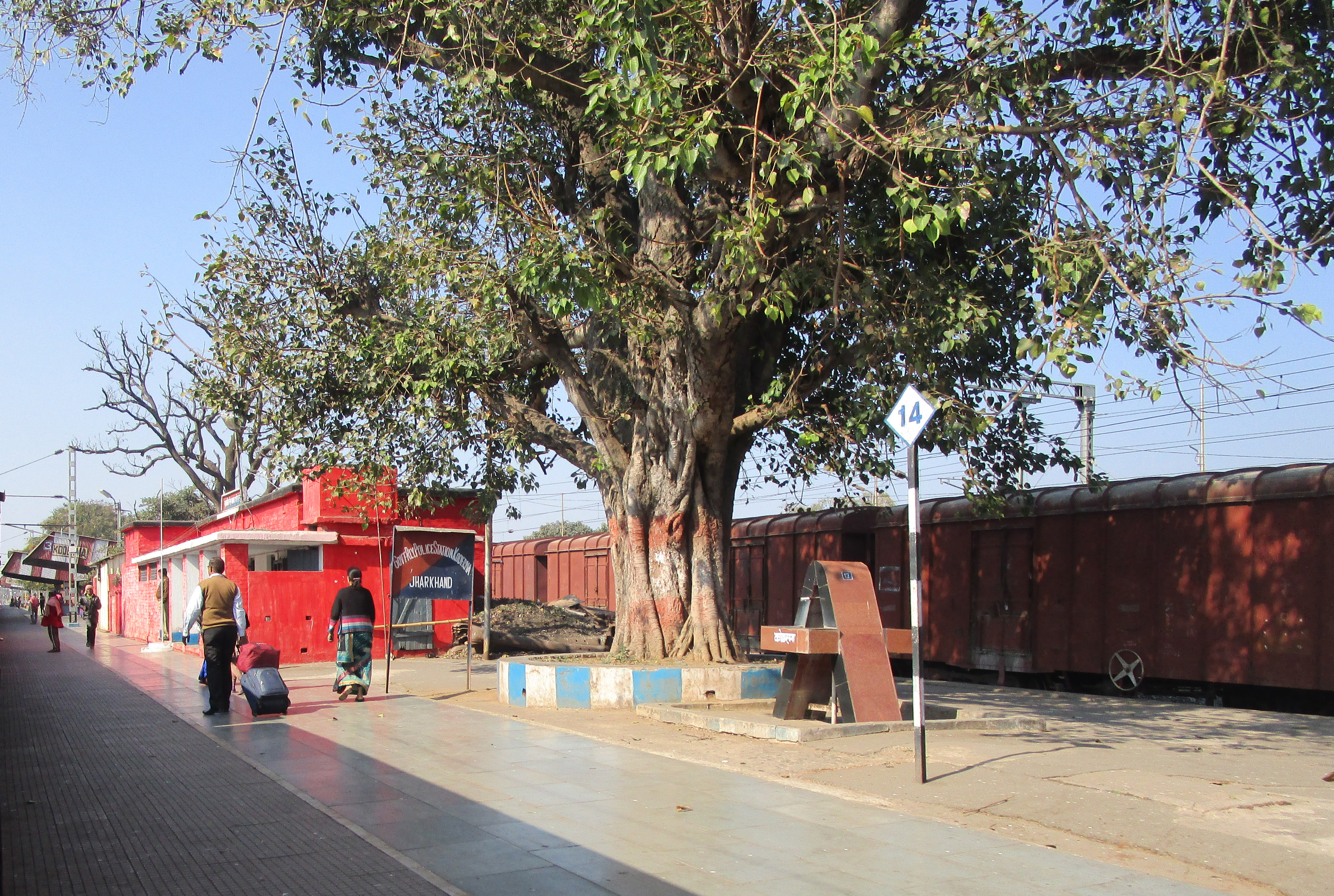
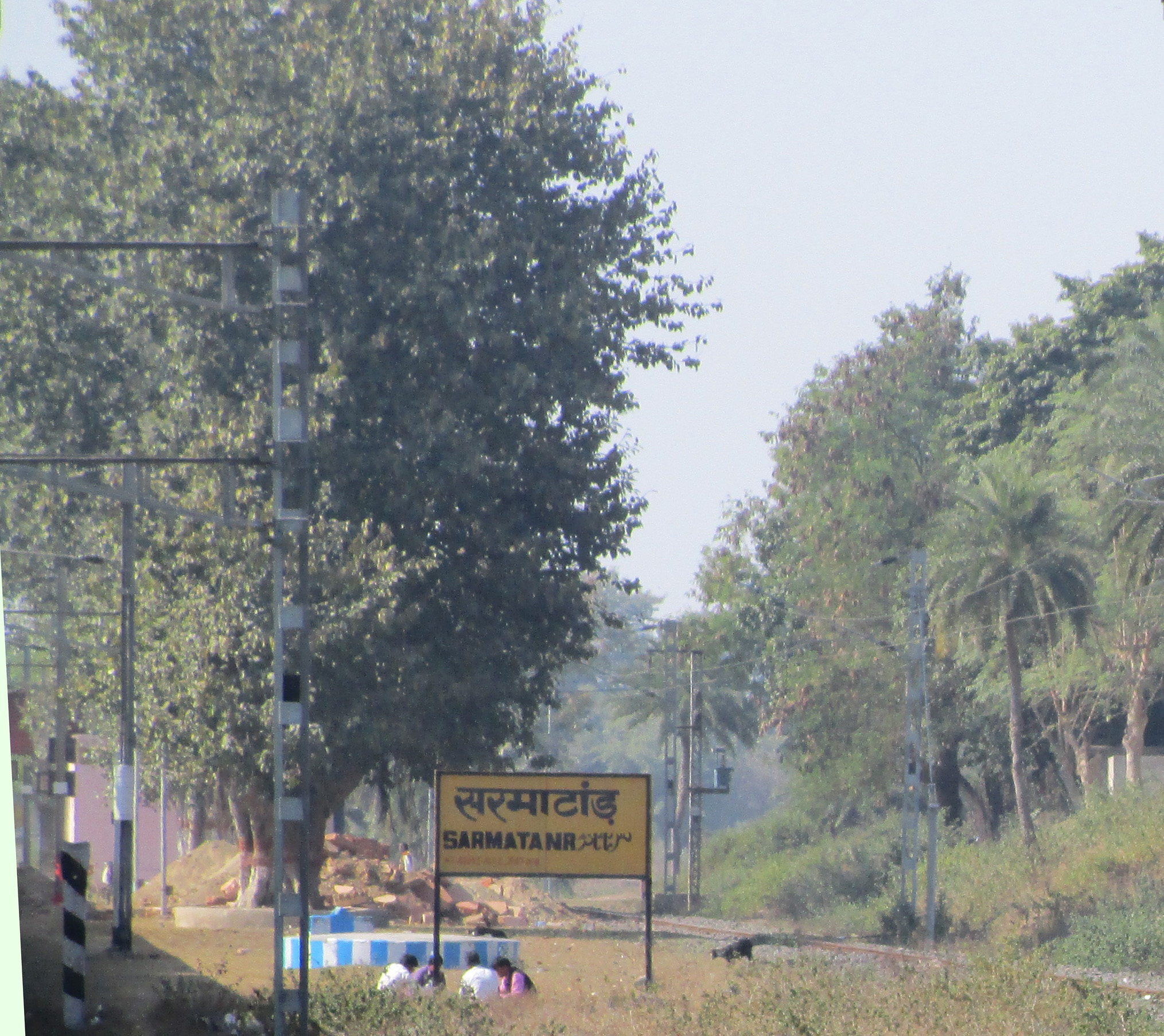
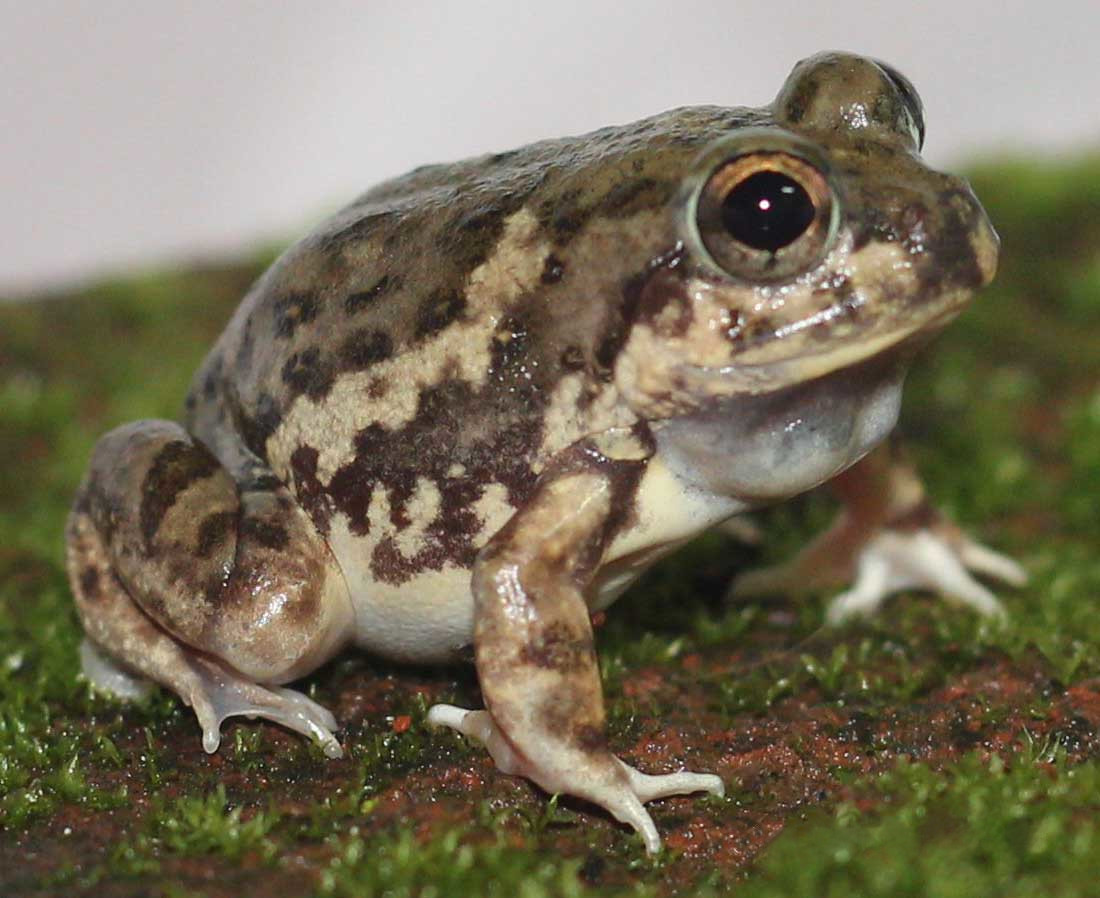
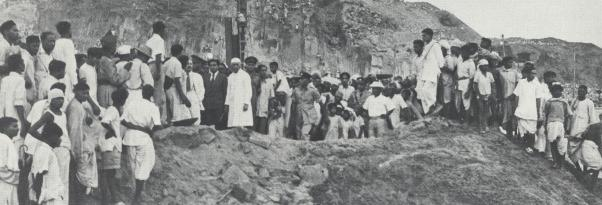

- Location in Jharkhand, India Koderma (India)
- Coordinates: 24°27′59.585″N 85°35′39.328″E
- Country: India
- State: Jharkhand
- District: Kodarma
- Named for: Kardam Rishi

Government
  - Type: Municipal governance in India
  - Body: Koderma Municipality
- Elevation: 397 m (1,302 ft)

Population (2011)
  - Total: 24,633

Languages (*For language details see Koderma (community development block)#Language and religion)
  - Official: Hindi, Urdu
- Time zone: UTC+5:30 (IST)
- PIN: 825410
- Telephone code: 06534
- Vehicle registration: JH-12
- Website: koderma.nic.in

Kodarma (also spelled as Koderma) is a city and a notified area in the Koderma subdivision of the Koderma district in the Indian state of Jharkhand. It is also the administrative headquarter of Koderma district.

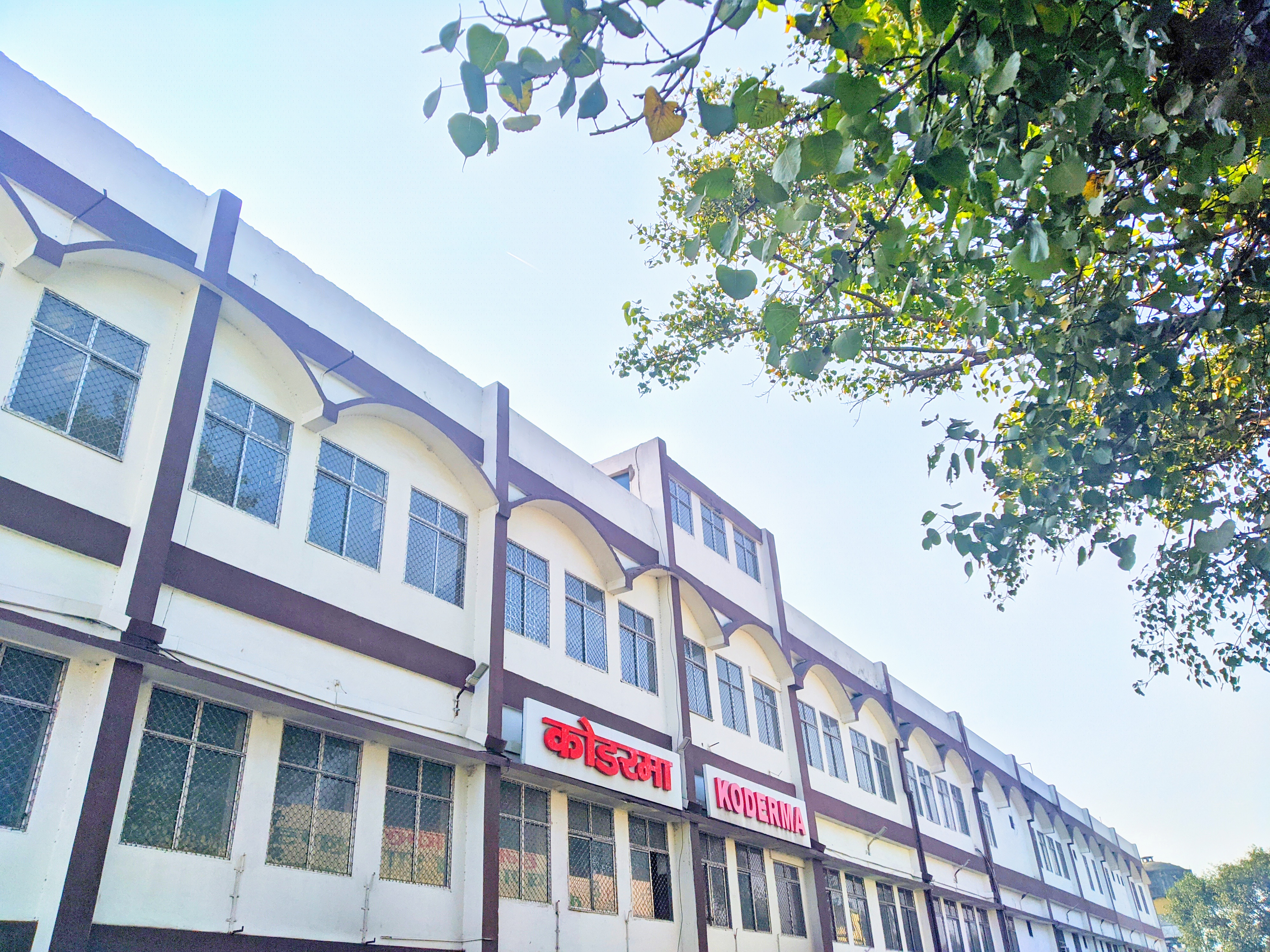
Koderma

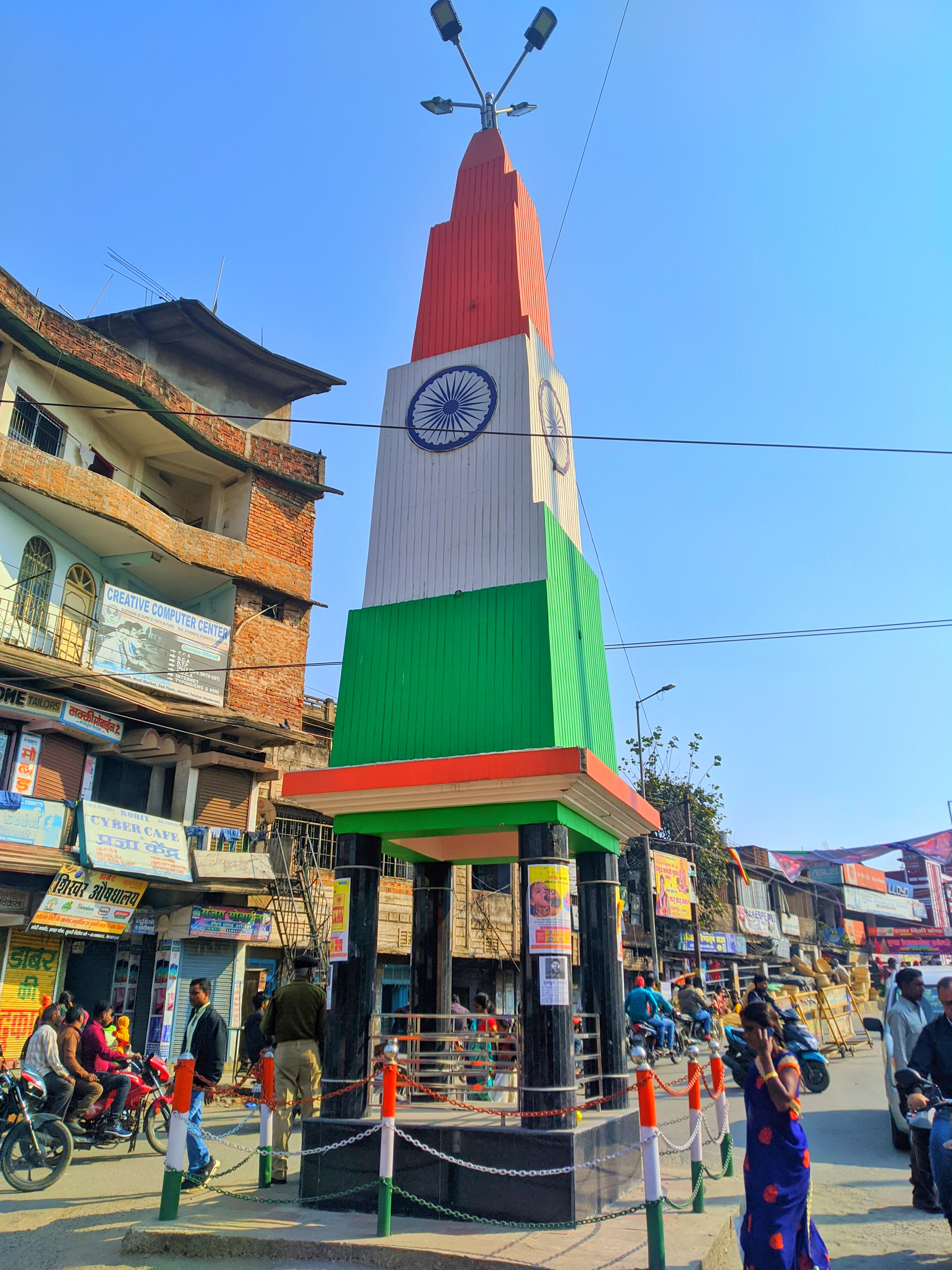
Jhanda Chowk

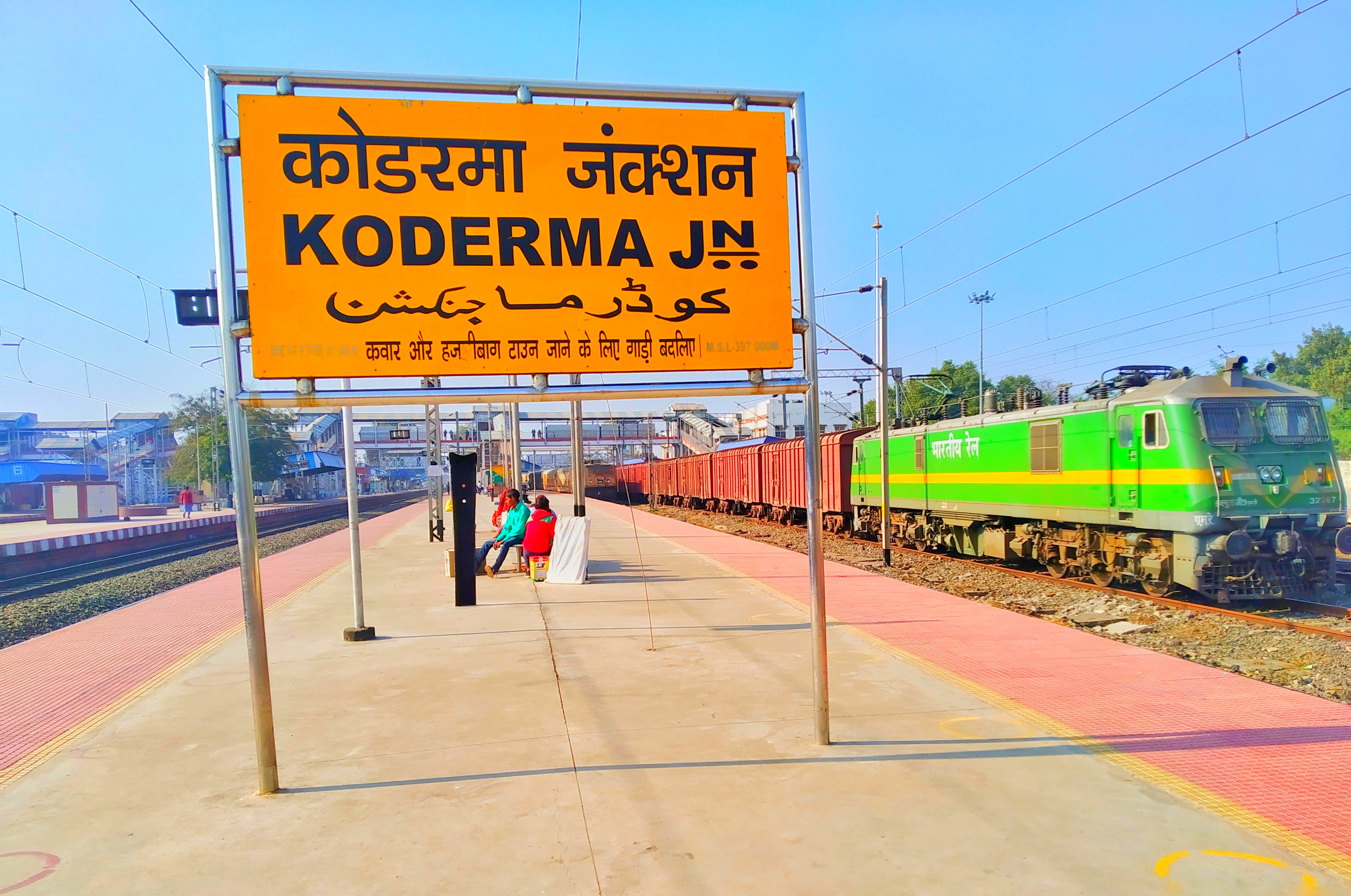
Koderma Junction

== Demographics ==
As per the 2011 Census of India, Kodarma Nagar Parishad had a total population of 24,633, of which 12,941 were males and 11,692 females. Scheduled Castes numbered 1,691, and Scheduled Tribes numbered 153.

As of 2001 India census, Kodarma had a population of 17,160. Males constitute 53% of the population, and females 47%. Kodarma has an average literacy rate of 63%, higher than the national average of 59.5%: male literacy is 71%, and female literacy is 53%. In Kodarma, 17% of the population is under 6 years of age.

== Hospitals ==
Sadar Hospital is the government-owned public hospital in the city.

== Economy ==
Koderma Thermal Power Station, a coal-based 1000 MW power plant of DVC, was established in 2012, employing thousands of people.

== See also ==
- Kodarma district
- Jhumri Telaiya
