= Daru (disambiguation) =

Daru is the capital of the Western Province of Papua New Guinea.

Daru may also refer to:

== Places ==
=== India ===
All pages in this section are located in Jharkand.

- Daru (community development block)
- Daru-Kharika, a village in Jharkhand
- Daru, Hazaribagh, a village in Jharkhand

=== Papua New Guinea ===
- Daru Island, an island in the Western Province
- Daru Urban LLG

=== Elsewhere ===
- Daru railway station, railway station in Banten, Indonesia
- Daru, Iran, a village in Hormozgan Province, Iran
- Daru, Sierra Leone, a town in Sierra Leone

== People ==
- Pierre Antoine Noël Bruno, comte Daru, a French soldier and statesman, (1767–1829)
- Napoléon, comte Daru, a French soldier and politician (1807–1890), son of Pierre Daru

== Others ==
- DARU (journal), an academic journal
- Daru (surname)
- Daru or daaru, the colloquial term for alcoholic beverages in Hindi, Punjabi and many other Indian languages
- Daru or Dvru, a variety of the Rawang language, spoken in northern Myanmar
