= Hazaribagh Sadar subdivision =

- Subdivision
- Location in Jharkhand, India Hazaribagh Sadar subdivision (India)
- Coordinates: 23.98°N 85.35°E
- Country: India
- State: Jharkhand
- District: Hazaribagh
- Headquarters: Hazaribagh

Area
  - Total: 2,903.26 km^{2} (1,120.95 sq mi)

Population
  - Total: 1,210,661
  - Density: 417.001/km^{2} (1,080.03/sq mi)

Languages
  - Official: Hindi, Urdu
- Time zone: UTC+5:30 (IST)
- Website: hazaribag.nic.in

Hazaribagh Sadar subdivision is an administrative subdivision of the Hazaribagh district in the North Chotanagpur division in the state of Jharkhand, India.

== History ==
During the period of Muslim rule, the thickly forested plateau area was ruled by big estates such as Ramgarh, Kunda, Kendi, Chai and Kharagdiha. With the East India Company acquiring the diwani of Bengal, Bihar and Odisha in 1765, it derived the right to collect revenue from the estates of Ramgarh, Kharagdiha, Kendi and Kunda. After the Kol uprising in 1831, the British changed the administrative structure of the area. The parganas of Ramgarh, Kharagdiha, Kendi and Kunda were made a part of the South West Frontier Agency and formed into a division named Hazaribagh with Hazaribagh as the administrative headquarter. In 1854 the designation of the South West Frontier Agency was changed to Chutia Nagpur and it began to be administered as a non-regulation province under the Lt. Governor of Bihar.

== Administrative set up ==
Hazaribagh district is divided in to two subdivisions – Hazaribagh Sadar and Barhi. There are 16 CD blocks and 15 revenue anchals with 1 statutory town, 16 census towns, 1308 villages and 257 are gram panchayats in the district.

Details of the subdivision are as follows:

Subdivision	Headquarters	Area km^{2}	Population (2011)	Rural population % (2011)	Urban population % (2011)
Hazaribagh Sadar	Hazaribagh	2,903.26	1,210,661	91.12	7.66
Barhi	Barhi	1,404.53	523,834	95.13	4.87

Note: Data calculated on the basis of census data for CD blocks and may vary a little against unpublished official data.

Cities, towns and locations in Hazaribagh district in North Chotanagpur Division
Some census towns and locations around Hazaribagh city have been shown in the Hazaribagh City map
M: municipality, CT: census town, R: rural/ urban centre, T: tourist centre, D: dam, HS: hot spring
Owing to space constraints in the small map, the actual locations in a larger map may vary slightly

== Demographics ==
According to the 2011 Census of India data, Hazaribagh Sadar subdivision, in Hazaribagh district, had a total population of 1,210.661. There were 623,236 (51%) males and 587,425 (49%) females. Scheduled castes numbered 205,973 (17.01%) and scheduled tribes numbered 105,076 (8.68%). Literacy rate was 70.91% (for the population below 6 years).

See also – List of Jharkhand districts ranked by literacy rate

Literacy in CD Blocks of
Hazaribagh district
Barhi subdivision
Chauparan – 69.41%
Barhi – 68.39%
Padma – 68.90%
Barkatha – 61.44%
Chalkusha – 67.13%
Hazaribagh Sadar subdivision
Ichak – 71.87%
Tati Jhariya – 60.68%
Daru – 71.08%
Bishnugarh – 62.04%
Sadar, Hazaribagh – 77.56%
Katkamsandi – 67.38%
Katkamdag – 69.97%
Keredari – 64.04%
Barkagaon – 65.44%
Churchu – 67.97%
Dadi – 70.26%
Source: 2011 Census: CD Block Wise
Primary Census Abstract Data

== Police stations ==
Police stations in Hazaribagh Sadar subdivision are at:

1. Sadar
2. Muffasil
3. Mahila and SC/ST
4. Barkagaon
5. Bishnugarh
6. Charhi
7. Churchu
8. Daru
9. Gidi
10. Ichak
11. Katkamsandi
12. Keredari

== Blocks ==
Community development blocks in the Hazaribagh Sadar subdivision are:

CD block	Headquarters	Area km^{2}	Population (2011)	SC %	ST %	Literacy rate %	Census town
Sadar, Hazaribagh	Hazaribagh	232.91	147,609	18.20	4.39	77.56	Meru, Marai Kalan, Okni
Barkagaon	Barkagaon	447.88	136,839	18.65	12.33	65.44	Urimari
Bishnugarh	Bishnugarh	416.99	156,477	11.03	10.02	62.04	Bishnugarh, Cherra
Churchu	Churchu	201.46	53,705	14.48	24.12	67.97	Charhi
Dadi	Dari	145.43	77,770	13.03	26.95	70.26	Dari, Religara, Gidi
Daru	Daru	128.06	52,305	19.81	9.58	71.08	-
Ichak	Ichak	286.62	112,815	20.93	2.65	71.87	-
Katkamdag	Katkamdag	163.03	82,385	21.01	4.16	69.97	Masratu, Kadma
Katkamsandi	Katkamsandi	300.52	108,361	20.95	6.59	67.88	Pelawal
Keredari	Keredari	354.87	91,357	22.33	5.87	64.04	-
Tati Jhariya	Tati Jhariya	199.04	48,549	17.76	12.97	60.68	-

Hazaribagh City
CT: census town, R: rural/ urban centre, T: tourist centre, C: educational centre, F: facility
Owing to space constraints in the small map, the actual locations in a larger map may vary slightly

== Economy ==
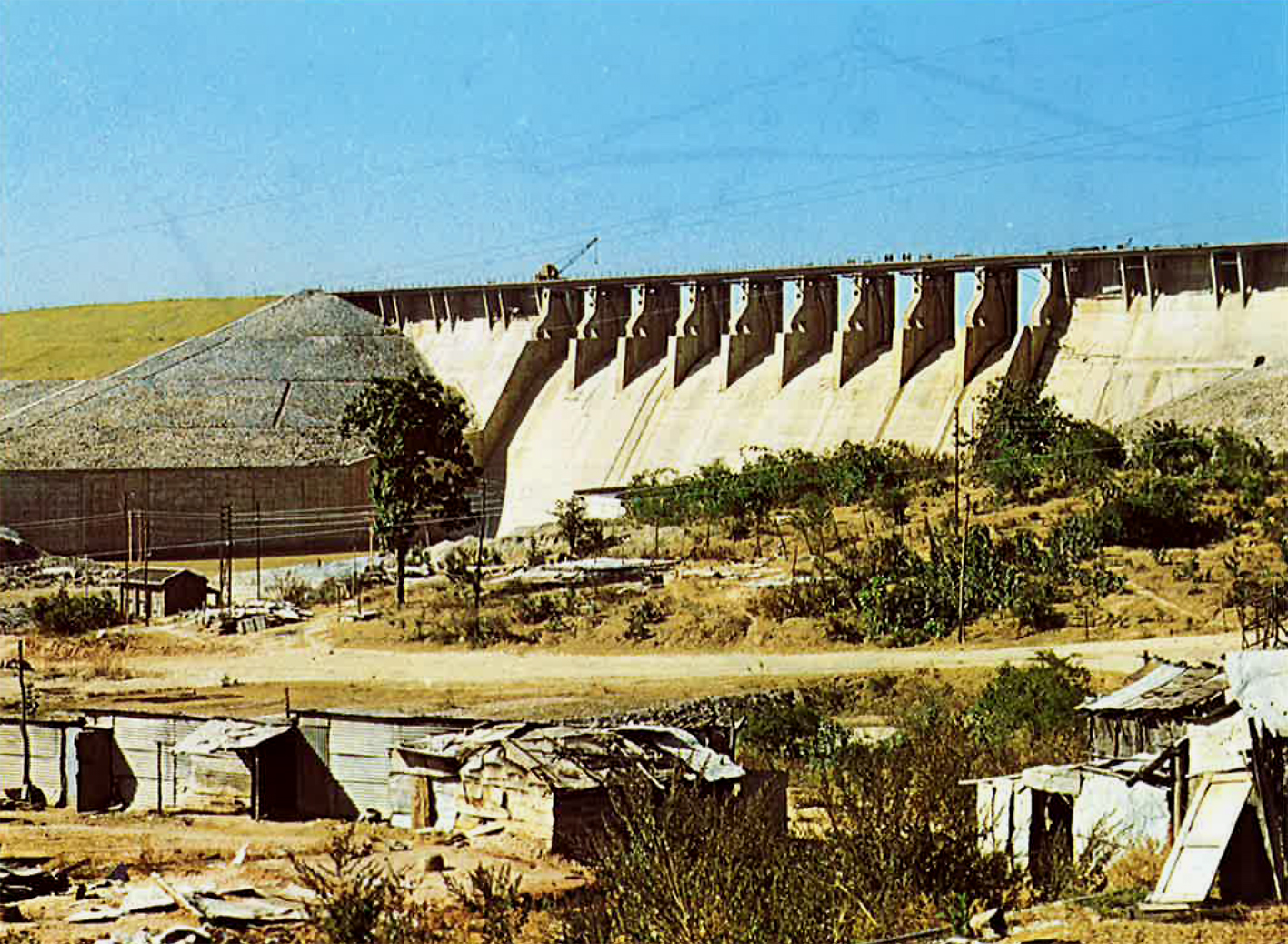
Konar Dam

=== Konar Dam ===
Konar Dam, located 41 kilometres (25 mi) south-east of Hazaribagh, was the second of the four multipurpose dams, built by the Damodar Valley Corporation, in 1955.

=== Coalmining ===
Coalmining started early in this area. Gidi was an old mining centre. Many of the other mining areas that were earlier a part of the Hazaribagh Sadar subdivision subsequently became parts of new neighbouring districts on their formation. New mining areas are coming up around Keredari and Barkagaon. As of 2021, five operational areas of Central Coalfields Limited were located partially in this subdivision: Amrapali & Chandragupta Area with Chandragupta open cast project coming up as a major project, Barka Sayal Area, Argada Area, Kuju Area, and Hazaribagh Area.

== Education ==
In 2011, in the Hazaribagh Sadar subdivision out of a total 703 inhabited villages there were 214 villages with pre-primary schools, 650 villages with primary schools, 346 villages with middle schools, 104 villages with secondary schools, 20 villages with senior secondary schools, 2 villages/ census towns with general degree college, 1 village with medical college, 3 villages with non-formal training centres, 7 villages with vocational training centres/ITI, 79 villages with no educational facility, 1 statutory city with 1 university, 1 engineering college, 1 management institution, 1 polytechnic.
.*Senior secondary schools are also known as Inter colleges in Jharkhand

=== Educational institutions ===
The following institutions are located in Hazaribagh Sadar subdivision:

- Vinoba Bhave University was established at Hazaribagh in 1972.
- St. Columba's College was established at Hazaribagh in 1899.
- Annada College was established at Hazaribagh in 1979.
- Markham College of Commerce was established at Hazaribagh in 1974.
- Krishna Ballav Women's College was established at Hazaribagh in 1963.
- Ghanshyam Mehta Institute at Ichak was established in 2007.
- Karnapura College was established in 1992 at Barkagaon.
- Sheikh Bhikhari Medical College was established at Kolghatti in 2019.

These colleges provide the ug and pg degrees and now many more colleges are open in hazaribagh like iccet college and many more.

== Healthcare ==
In 2011, in the Hazaribagh Sadar subdivision there were 35 villages with primary health centres, 84 villages with primary health subcentres, 30 villages with maternity and child welfare centres, 21 villages with allopathic hospitals, 22 villages with dispensaries, 20 villages with veterinary hospitals, 13 villages with family welfare centres, 74 villages with medicine shops, 1 statutory city with 4 nursing homes.
.*Private medical practitioners, alternative medicine etc. not included

=== Medical facilities ===
CCL - AKC, Gidi A at Gidi with 31 beds has 6 general duty medical officers and 1 specialist. Among the medical facilities it has is: X-ray machine. It has 3 ambulances.
