= Garri Kalan =

- Village
- Location in Jharkhand, India Garri Kalan (India)
- Coordinates: 23.8715°N 85.1663°E
- Country: India
- State: Jharkhand
- District: Hazaribagh

Languages
  - Official: Hindi, Urdu
- Time zone: UTC+5:30 (IST)
- PIN: 825311 (Barkagaon)
- Telephone/ STD code: 06551
- Vehicle registration: JH 02
- Website: hazaribag.nic.in

Garri Kalan is a panchayat village under Keredari CD block in Hazaribagh district in the Indian state of Jharkhand.

The village Garri Kalan has 2 primary schools, 1 middle school, and 1 secondary school.
