= Ichak =

- Village
- Location in Jharkhand, India Ichak (India)
- Coordinates: 24.0901°N 85.4305°E
- Country: India
- State: Jharkhand
- District: Hazaribagh

Population (2011)
  - Total: 2,280

Languages (*For language details see Ichak (community development block)#Language and religion)
  - Official: Hindi, Urdu
- Time zone: UTC+5:30 (IST)
- PIN: 825402 (Ichak)
- Telephone/ STD code: 06548
- Vehicle registration: JH 02
- Website: hazaribag.nic.in

Ichak (also referred to as Puranaichak) is a village in the Ichak CD block in the Hazaribagh Sadar subdivision of the Hazaribagh district in the Indian state of Jharkhand.

== History ==
Ichak was the old capital of Ramgarh Raj since 1772. Over a hundred temples were built under the patronage of Raja Tej Singh and his successors. Budhiya Mandir Lohri is the best known.

== Geography ==
Cities, towns and locations in Hazaribagh district in North Chotanagpur Division
Some census towns and locations around Hazaribagh city have been shown in the Hazaribagh City map
M: municipality, CT: census town, R: rural/ urban centre, T: tourist centre, D: dam, HS: hot spring
Owing to space constraints in the small map, the actual locations in a larger map may vary slightly

=== Location ===
Ichak is located at 24.0901°N 85.4305°E.

=== Area overview ===
Hazaribagh district is a plateau area and forests occupy around about 45% of the total area. It is a predominantly rural area with 92.34% of the population living in rural areas against 7.66% in the urban areas. There are many census towns in the district, as can be seen in the map alongside. Agriculture is the main occupation of the people but with the extension of coal mines, particularly in the southern part of the district, employment in coal mines is increasing. However, it has to be borne in mind that modern mining operations are highly mechanised. Four operational areas of Central Coalfields are marked on the map. All these areas are spread across partly this district and partly the neighbouring districts.

Note: The map alongside presents some of the notable locations in the district. All places marked in the map are linked in the larger full screen map. Urbanisation data calculated on the basis of census data for CD blocks and may vary a little against unpublished official data.

== Civic administration ==
=== Police station ===
Padma police station serves the Ichak CD block.

=== CD block HQ ===
The headquarters of Ichak CD block are located at Ichak.

== Demographics ==
According to the 2011 Census of India, Puranaichak had a total population of 2,280, of which 1,169 (51%) were males and 1,111 (49%) were females. Population in the age range 0-6 years was 375. The total number of literate persons in Puranaichak was 1,534 (80.52% of the population over 6 years).

== Transport ==
The Ichak More-Goplo road links Ichak to National Highway 20 and also to the Hazaribagh-Hazaribagh Road station (Suriya) road.

== Education ==
KN+2 High School was established by Raja Kamakhya Narayan. It is one of the oldest and first higher education institute.

Ghanshyam Mehta Institute at Ichak was established in 2007. It offers intermediate courses in arts and commerce.

Ghanshyam Mehta Evening College, Ichak

== Healthcare ==
There is a primary health centre at Ichak.
