= Bishnugarh =

- Census Town
- Location in Jharkhand, India Bishnugarh (India)
- Coordinates: 24.0243°N 85.7404°E
- Country: India
- State: Jharkhand
- District: Hazaribagh

Population (2011)
  - Total: 4,847

Languages
  - Official: Hindi, Santhali
- Time zone: UTC+5:30 (IST)
- PIN: 825312 (Bishnugarh)
- Telephone/ STD code: 06557
- Vehicle registration: JH 02
- Website: hazaribag.nic.in

Bishnugarh (also called Bishungarh) is a census town in the Bishnugarh CD block in the Hazaribagh Sadar subdivision of the Hazaribagh district in the Indian state of Jharkhand.

== Geography ==
Cities, towns and locations in Hazaribagh district in North Chotanagpur Division
Some census towns and locations around Hazaribagh city have been shown in the Hazaribagh City map
M: municipality, CT: census town, R: rural/ urban centre, T: tourist centre, D: dam, HS: hot spring
Owing to space constraints in the small map, the actual locations in a larger map may vary slightly

=== Location ===
Bishnugarh is located at 24.0243°N 85.7404°E.

Konar Dam is 10 km from Bishungarh. It is off Bishnugarh-Gomia road.

=== Area overview ===
Hazaribagh district is a plateau area and forests occupy around about 45% of the total area. It is a predominantly rural area with 92.34% of the population living in rural areas against 7.66% in the urban areas. There are many census towns in the district, as can be seen in the map alongside. Agriculture is the main occupation of the people but with the extension of coal mines, particularly in the southern part of the district, employment in coal mines is increasing. However, it has to be borne in mind that modern mining operations are highly mechanised. Four operational areas of Central Coalfields are marked on the map. All these areas are spread across partly this district and partly the neighbouring districts.

Note: The map alongside presents some of the notable locations in the district. All places marked in the map are linked in the larger full screen map. Urbanisation data calculated on the basis of census data for CD blocks and may vary a little against unpublished official data.

== Civic administration ==
=== Police station ===
Bishnugarh police station serves the Bishnugarh CD block.

=== CD block HQ ===
The headquarters of Bishnugarh CD block are located at Bishnugarh.

== Demographics ==
According to the 2011 Census of India, Bishnugarh (location code 368484) had a total population of 4,847, of which 2,527 (52%) were males and 2,320 (48%) were females. Population in the age range 0–6 years was 728. The total number of literate persons in Bishnugarh was 3,414 (82.88% of the population over 6 years).

== Infrastructure ==
According to the District Census Handbook 2011, Hazaribagh, Bishnugarh covered an area of 1.97 km^{2}. Among the civic amenities, it had 13 km roads with both open and covered drains, the protected water supply involved covered wells, uncovered wells. It had 742 domestic electric connections, 11 road lighting points. Among the educational facilities it had 2 primary schools, 2 middle schools, the nearest secondary school, senior secondary school at Chedar 1 km away. One important community it manufactured was bell metal (kansa) utensils. It had the branch office of 1 agricultural credit society.

== Transport ==
The Gomia road meets Hazaribagh-Hazaribagh Road railway station (Suriya) road at Bishnugarh. Bagodar, on National Highway 19 (old NH 2), is around 13 km away. Hazaribagh is 45 km west of Bishnugarh.

== Education ==
Bishnugarh Inter College, located at Chalanga, was established in 1984. It is a co-educational institute with arrangements for teaching in classes XI and XII.

Bishnugarh +2 High School, located at Urgi, was established in 1956. It offers courses in arts, science and commerce at the +2 level
