= Cherra =

Cherra may refer to:

- Cherrapunji, or Sohra, a town in Meghalaya, India
- Cherra, Hazaribagh, a census town in Jharkhand, India
