= Urimari =

- Census Town
- Location in Jharkhand, India Urimari (India)
- Coordinates: 23.6983°N 85.3131°E
- Country: India
- State: Jharkhand
- District: Hazaribagh
- Elevation: 397 m (1,302 ft)

Population (2011)
  - Total: 4,948

Languages (*For language details see Barkagaon (community development block)#Language and religion)
  - Official: Hindi, Urdu
- Time zone: UTC+5:30 (IST)
- PIN: 829125 (Sayal)
- Telephone/ STD code: 06551
- Vehicle registration: JH 02
- Website: hazaribag.nic.in

Urimari is a census town in the Barkagaon CD block in the Hazaribagh Sadar subdivision of Hazaribagh district in the Indian state of Jharkhand.

== Geography ==
Cities, towns and locations in Hazaribagh district in North Chotanagpur Division
Some census towns and locations around Hazaribagh city have been shown in the Hazaribagh City map
M: municipality, CT: census town, R: rural/ urban centre, T: tourist centre, D: dam, HS: hot spring
Owing to space constraints in the small map, the actual locations in a larger map may vary slightly

=== Location ===
Urimari is located at 23.6983°N 85.3131°E.

The Damodar flows past Urimari.

=== Area overview ===
Hazaribagh district is a plateau area and forests occupy around about 45% of the total area. It is a predominantly rural area with 92.34% of the population living in rural areas against 7.66% in the urban areas. There are many census towns in the district, as can be seen in the map alongside. Agriculture is the main occupation of the people but with the extension of coal mines, particularly in the southern part of the district, employment in coal mines is increasing. However, it has to be borne in mind that modern mining operations are highly mechanised. Four operational areas of Central Coalfields are marked on the map. All these areas are spread across partly this district and partly the neighbouring districts.

Note: The map alongside presents some of the notable locations in the district. All places marked in the map are linked in the larger full screen map. Urbanisation data calculated on the basis of census data for CD blocks and may vary a little against unpublished official data.

== Civic administration ==
=== Police out-post ===
Urimari police out-post serves the Barkagaon CD block.

== Demographics ==
According to the 2011 Census of India, Urimari had a total population of 4,948, of which 2,640 (53%) were males and 2,308 (47%) were females. Population in the age range 0–6 years was 638. The total number of literate persons in Urimari was 3,392 (78.70% of the population over 6 years).

== Infrastructure ==
According to the District Census Handbook 2011, Hazaribagh, Urimari covered an area of 4.93 km^{2}. Among the civic amenities, it had 10 km roads with open drains, the protected water supply involved tap water from treated sources, uncovered well, overhead tank. It had 947 domestic electric connections, 40 road lighting points. Among the educational facilities it had 3 primary schools, 1 middle school, 3 secondary school, the nearest senior secondary school at Dari 10 km away. Among the social, recreational and cultural facilities, it had 1 stadium, 1 public library, reading room. It had the branch office of 1 nationalised bank.

== Economy ==
Projects in the Barka Sayal Area of Central Coalfields are: Bhurkunda U/G, Central Saunda U/G, Saunda-D U/G, Saunda U/G, Sayal-D U/G, Urimari U/G, Urimari O/C, North Urimari/ Birsa O/C and Bhurkunda O/C.

== Education ==
DAV Public School was established at Urimari in 1994.The school has classes up to senior secondary level. It is a co-educational school affiliated to CBSE.
