= Charowa dam =

Dam in Hazaribagh district, Jharkhand, India

Charowa Dam
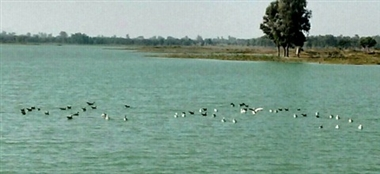

- Location in Jharkhand
- Country: India
- Location: Hazaribagh district, Jharkhand
- Coordinates: 24.0286°N 85.3154°E
- Status: Functional

Dam and spillways
- Spillway type: Concrete spillways

Charowa Dam, also known as Charwa Dam, is situated in the midst of four hills in Hazaribagh district, Jharkhand, India. The Charowa Dam reservoir is known to fill up beyond the safe level during the monsoon, most recently in 2017, when spill gates were opened to prevent unsafe levels.

The reservoir is home to various vulture species, including the largest and the smallest vultures, the Himalayan vulture and the Egyptian vulture respectively. Critically endangered species like the Indian vulture and White-rumped vulture are also found here.
