= Churchu (community development block) =

- Community development block
- Location in Jharkhand Churchu (India)
- Coordinates: 23°54′26″N 85°30′44″E
- Country: India
- State: Jharkhand
- District: Hazaribagh

Government
  - Type: Federal democracy

Area
  - Total: 201.46 km^{2} (77.78 sq mi)

Population (2011)
  - Total: 53,705
  - Density: 266.58/km^{2} (690.44/sq mi)

Languages
  - Official: Hindi, Urdu
- Time zone: UTC+5:30 (IST)
- PIN: 825302 (Nagrichurchu)
- Telephone/ STD code: 06545
- Vehicle registration: JH 02
- Lok Sabha constituency: Hazaribagh
- Vidhan Sabha constituency: Hazaribagh
- Website: hazaribag.nic.in

Churchu is a community development block (CD block) that forms an administrative division in the Hazaribagh Sadar subdivision of the Hazaribagh district in the Indian state of Jharkhand.

== Overview ==
Hazaribagh district is spread over a part of the Chota Nagpur Plateau. The central plateau, averaging a height of 2,000 ft (610 m), occupies the central part of the district. On all sides, except on the western side, it is surrounded by the lower plateau, averaging a height of 1,300 ft (396 m), the surface being undulating. In the north and the north-west the lower plateau forms a fairly level tableland till the ghats, when the height drops to about 700 ft (213 m) and slopes down gradually. The Damodar and the Barakar form the two main watersheds in the district. DVC has constructed the Konar Dam across the Konar River. It is a forested district with cultivation as the main occupation of the people. Coal is the main mineral found in this district. China clay is also found in this district. Inaugurating the Pradhan Mantri Ujjwala Yojana in 2016, Raghubar Das, Chief Minister of Jharkhand, had indicated that there were 23 lakh BPL families in Jharkhand. There was a plan to bring the BPL proportion in the total population down to 35%.

== Maoist activities ==
Right from its inception in 2000. Jharkhand was a “laboratory” for Naxalites to experiment with their ideas of establishing a parallel government. As of 2005, 16 of the 22 districts in the state, including Hazaribagh district, was transformed into a “guerrilla zone”. The movement was not restricted to armed operations but included kangaroo courts called Jan Adalats, elected village bodies and people's police. Jharkhand, with a dense forest cover over a large part of the state, offers a favourable terrain for the Naxalites to build their bases and operate. Annual fatalities in Jharkhand were 117 in 2003 and 150 in 2004. In 2013 Jharkhand was considered one of the two states in the country most affected by Left wing extremism and Jharkhand police set up an exclusive cell to deal with Maoist activities. However, in the same year, when Jharkhand police identified 13 focus areas for combating Maoist extremism, Hazaribagh district was not one of them.

== Geography ==
Churchu is located at 23°54′26″N 85°30′44″E.

Churchu CD block is bounded by Sadar, Hazaribagh, Daru and Tati Jhariya CD blocks on the north, Mandu CD block, in Ramgarh district, on the east, Dadi CD block on the south and Barkagaon CD block on the west.

Chuchu CD block has an area of 201.46 km^{2}. As of 2011, Churchu CD block had 8 gram panchayats, 40 inhabited villages and 1 census town (Charhi).Churchu and Charhi police stations serve this CD block. Headquarters of this CD block is at Churchu.

== Demographics ==
=== Population ===
According to the 2011 Census of India, Churchu CD block had a total population of 53,705, of which 46,863 were rural and 6,842 were urban. There were 27,458 (51%) males and 26,247 (49%) females. Population in the age range 0–6 years was 8,241. Scheduled Castes numbered 7,776 (14.48%) and Scheduled Tribes numbered 12,952 (24.12%).

Census town in Churchu CD block is (2011 census figures in brackets): Charhi (6,842).

Villages in Churchu CD block include (2011 census figures in brackets): Churchu (1,279).

=== Literacy ===
As of 2011 census, the total number of literate persons in Churchu CD block was 30,903 (67.97% of the population over 6 years) out of which males numbered 18,339 (79.03% of the male population over 6 years) and females numbered 12,564 (56.44% of the female population over 6 years). The gender disparity (the difference between female and male literacy rates) was 22.59%.

As of 2011 census, literacy in Hazaribagh district was 70.48%. Literacy in Jharkhand was 67.63% in 2011. Literacy in India in 2011 was 74.04%.

See also – List of Jharkhand districts ranked by literacy rate

Literacy in CD Blocks of
Hazaribagh district
Barhi subdivision
Chauparan – 69.41%
Barhi – 68.39%
Padma – 68.90%
Barkatha – 61.44%
Chalkusha – 67.13%
Hazaribagh Sadar subdivision
Ichak – 71.87%
Tati Jhariya – 60.68%
Daru – 71.08%
Bishnugarh – 62.04%
Sadar, Hazaribagh – 77.56%
Katkamsandi – 67.38%
Katkamdag – 69.97%
Keredari – 64.04%
Barkagaon – 65.44%
Churchu – 67.97%
Dadi – 70.26%
Source: 2011 Census: CD Block Wise
Primary Census Abstract Data

=== Language and religion ===
Religions in Churchu CD block (2011)
Religion	Percent
Hinduism	70.41%
Sarna	14.90%
Islam	11.78%
Christianity	2.79%
Other or not stated	0.12%

In 2011, 37,815 (70.41%) of the population was Hindu, 6,327 (11.78%) Muslim, 1,499 (2.79%) Christian. Other religions were 8,064 (15.02%).

Languages of Churchu CD block (2011)
1. Khortha (61.5%)
2. Santali (19.0%)
3. Hindi (11.0%)
4. Urdu (4.04%)
5. Sadri (1.18%)
6. Bhojpuri (0.97%)
7. Others (2.33%)

At the time of the 2011 census, 61.52% of the population spoke Khortha, 18.99% Santali, 10.97 Hindi, 4.04% Urdu, 1.18% Sadri and 0.97% Bhojpuri as their first language.

== Rural poverty ==
40-50% of the population of Hazaribagh district were in the BPL category in 2004–2005, being in the same category as Godda, Giridih and Koderma districts. Rural poverty in Jharkhand declined from 66% in 1993–94 to 46% in 2004–05. In 2011, it has come down to 39.1%.

== Economy ==
=== Livelihood ===
Livelihood
in Churchu CD block
1. Cultivators (32.7%)
2. Agricultural labourers (30.5%)
3. Household industries (2.75%)
4. Other Workers (34.0%)

In Churchu CD block in 2011, amongst the class of total workers, cultivators numbered 6,925 and formed 32.72%, agricultural labourers numbered 6,461 and formed 30.53%, household industry workers numbered 583 and formed 2.75% and other workers numbered 7,195 and formed 34.00%. Total workers numbered 21,164 and formed 39.41% of the total population, and non-workers numbered 32,541 and formed 60.59% of the population.

Note: In the census records, a person is considered a cultivator, if the person is engaged in cultivation/ supervision of land owned. When a person who works on another person's land for wages in cash or kind or share, is regarded as an agricultural labourer. Household industry is defined as an industry conducted by one or more members of the family within the household or village, and one that does not qualify for registration as a factory under the Factories Act. Other workers are persons engaged in some economic activity other than cultivators, agricultural labourers and household workers. It includes factory, mining, plantation, transport and office workers, those engaged in business and commerce, teachers, entertainment artistes and so on.

=== Infrastructure ===
There are 40 inhabited villages in Churchu CD block. In 2011, 23 villages had power supply. 4 villages had tap water (treated/ untreated), 40 villages had well water (covered/ uncovered), 40 villages had hand pumps, and all villages had drinking water facility. 3 villages had post offices, 2 villages had sub post offices, 2 villages had telephones (land lines) and 27 villages had mobile phone coverage. 40 villages had pucca (hard top) village roads, 8 villages had bus service (public/ private), 1 village had autos/ modified autos, and 12 villages had tractors. 1 village had a bank branch, 2 villages had agricultural credit societies, no village had cinema/ video hall, no village had public library and public reading room. 21 villages had public distribution system, 1 village had weekly haat (market) and 19 villages had assembly polling stations.

=== Forestry and agriculture ===
The main occupation of the people of Hazaribagh district is cultivation. While forests occupy around 45% of the total area, the cultivable area forms about 39% of the total area. The forests are uniformly spread across the district. Sal is the predominant species in the jungles. Other species are: bamboo, khair, sali, semal, mahua, tamarind, mango, black-berry (jamun), peepal, karnaj, jack-fruit, margosa (neem), kusum, palas, kend, asan, piar and bhelwa. Hazaribag Wildlife Sanctuary is located around 19 km north of Hazaribag. Irrigation facilities in this hilly area are inadequate and generally farmers depend on rain for their cultivation. The land situated along the river banks, or low land, is fertile but the uplands are generally barren. May to October is Kharif season, followed by Rabi season. Rice is the main crop of the district. Other important crops grown are: bazra, maize, pulses (mainly arhar and gram) and oilseeds. Limited quantities of cash crops, such as sugar cane, are grown.

=== Coal mining ===
With large coal deposits in the Barkagaon and Charhi areas of North Karanpura Coalfield, coal mining is becoming a major employment provider in Hazaribagh district.

Projects in the Hazaribagh Area of Central Coalfields are: Parej East OC, Kedla UG, Kedla OC, Tapin OC, Jharkhand OC, Kedla Washery and Regional R/Workshop.

=== Backward Regions Grant Fund ===
Hazaribagh district is listed as a backward region and receives financial support from the Backward Regions Grant Fund. The fund, created by the Government of India, is designed to redress regional imbalances in development. As of 2012, 272 districts across the country were listed under this scheme. The list includes 21 districts of Jharkhand.

== NGO activity ==
Plan India, a registered not for profit organisation, is implementing its Child Centred Community Development (CCCD) programme in Churchu block of Hazaribagh district comprising 21 villages and 3 panchayats. Amongst its activities are: development of 15 schools as model schools with infrastructural development and improved quality education. 7,000 patients have been treated for minor ailments in 120 health camps across 21 villages. SUPPORT, a Non-Governmental Organization, Head Office- Hazaribagh, has worked to promote WaSH initiatives in the 41 villages under Churchu-Block by implementing Projects such as WATSAN, MGM, ODF and currently implementing Jal Jeevan Mission with CInI, TATA Trust. The major activities Initiated for Social and Behavior change Communication by SUPPORT are Orientation on WaSH in Gram Sabhas with PRI members, Orientation on wastewater management and Rallies to spread awareness in villages. 1485 Households are getting water supply through the schemes of Chruchu Gramin Jalapurti Yojna and Jarba Gramin Jalapurti Yojna under Jal Jeevan Mission.

== Transport ==
National Highway 20 passes through Churchu CD block.

The 57 km long Hazaribagh-Barkakana section of the Koderma-Hazaribagh-Barkakana-Ranchi line was opened for passenger trains on 7 December 2016 by the railway minister Suresh Prabhu in the presence of chief minister Raghubar Das. The railway line passes through Churchu CD block and Charhi railway station is on this line.

== Education ==
In 2011, amongst the 40 inhabited villages in Churchu CD block, 4 villages had no primary school, 26 villages had one primary school and 10 villages had more than one primary school. 17 villages had at least one primary school and one middle school. 1 village had at least one middle school and one secondary school.

== Healthcare ==
In 2011, amongst the 40 inhabited villages in Churchu CD block, 6 villages had primary health centres, 7 villages had primary health sub-centres, 2 villages had maternity and child welfare centres, 3 villages had allopathic hospitals, 3 villages had veterinary hospitals, 4 villages had medicine shops and 20 villages had no medical facilities.
