= Ichak (community development block) =

- Community development block
- Location in Jharkhand Ichak (India)
- Coordinates: 24.090°N 85.431°E
- Country: India
- State: Jharkhand
- District: Hazaribagh

Government
  - Type: Federal democracy

Area
  - Total: 286.62 km^{2} (110.66 sq mi)
- Elevation: 371 m (1,217 ft)

Population (2011)
  - Total: 112,815
  - Density: 393.60/km^{2} (1,019.4/sq mi)

Languages
  - Official: Hindi, Urdu
- Time zone: UTC+5:30 (IST)
- PIN: 825402 (Ichak)
- Telephone/ STD code: 06548
- Vehicle registration: JH 02
- Lok Sabha constituency: Kodarma
- Vidhan Sabha constituency: Barkatha
- Website: hazaribag.nic.in

Ichak is a community development block (CD block) that forms an administrative division in the Hazaribagh Sadar subdivision of the Hazaribagh district in the Indian state of Jharkhand.

== Overview ==
Hazaribagh district is spread over a part of the Chota Nagpur Plateau. The central plateau, averaging a height of 2,000 ft (610 m), occupies the central part of the district. On all sides, except on the western side, it is surrounded by the lower plateau, averaging a height of 1,300 ft (396 m), the surface being undulating. In the north and the north-west the lower plateau forms a fairly level tableland till the ghats, when the height drops to about 700 ft (213 m) and slopes down gradually. The Damodar and the Barakar form the two main watersheds in the district. DVC has constructed the Konar Dam across the Konar River. It is a forested district with cultivation as the main occupation of the people. Coal is the main mineral found in this district. China clay is also found in this district. Inaugurating the Pradhan Mantri Ujjwala Yojana in 2016, Raghubar Das, Chief Minister of Jharkhand, had indicated that there were 23 lakh BPL families in Jharkhand. There was a plan to bring the BPL proportion in the total population down to 35%.

== Maoist activities ==
Right from its inception in 2000. Jharkhand was a “laboratory” for Naxalites to experiment with their ideas of establishing a parallel government. As of 2005, 16 of the 22 districts in the state, including Hazaribagh district, was transformed into a “guerrilla zone”. The movement was not restricted to armed operations but included kangaroo courts called Jan adalats, elected village bodies and people's police. Jharkhand, with a dense forest cover over a large part of the state, offers a favourable terrain for the Naxalites to build their bases and operate. Annual fatalities in Jharkhand were 117 in 2003 and 150 in 2004. In 2013 Jharkhand was considered one of the two states in the country most affected by Left wing extremism and Jharkhand police set up an exclusive cell to deal with Maoist activities. However, in the same year, when Jharkhand police identified 13 focus areas for combating Maoist extremism, Hazaribagh district was not one of them.

== Geography ==
Ichak is located at 24.090°N 85.431°E. It has an average elevation of 371 metres (1,217 ft).

Ichak CD block is bounded by Padma, Barhi and Barkatha CD blocks, on the north, Tati Jhariya and Daru CD blocks on the east, Sadar, Hazaribagh CD block on the south and Katkmsandi CD block on the west.

Ichak CD block has an area of 286.62 km^{2}. As of 2011, Ichak CD block had 19 gram panchayats, 88 inhabited villages and no census towns. The Ichak police station serves this CD block, Headquarters of this CD block is at Ichak.

== Demographics ==
=== Population ===
According to the 2011 Census of India, Ichak CD block had a total population of 112,815, all of which were rural. There were 58,244 (52%) males and 54,571 (48%) females. Population in the age range 0–6 years was 17,844. Scheduled Castes numbered 23,607 (20.93%) and Scheduled Tribes numbered 2,988 (2.65%).

Large villages (with 4,000+ population) in Ichak CD block are (2011 census figures in brackets): Dumraon (7,827), Bonga (4,436) and Dekuli (4,041).

=== Literacy ===
As of 2011 census, the total number of literate persons in Ichak CD block was 68,255 (71.87% of the population over 6 years) out of which males numbered 39,699 (81.31% of the male population over 6 years) and females numbered 28,556 (61.88% of the female population over 6 years). The gender disparity (the difference between female and male literacy rates) was 19.43%.

As of 2011 census, literacy in Hazaribagh district was 70.48%. Literacy in Jharkhand was 67.63% in 2011. Literacy in India in 2011 was 74.04%.

See also – List of Jharkhand districts ranked by literacy rate

Literacy in CD Blocks of
Hazaribagh district
Barhi subdivision
Chauparan – 69.41%
Barhi – 68.39%
Padma – 68.90%
Barkatha – 61.44%
Chalkusha – 67.13%
Hazaribagh Sadar subdivision
Ichak – 71.87%
Tati Jhariya – 60.68%
Daru – 71.08%
Bishnugarh – 62.04%
Sadar, Hazaribagh – 77.56%
Katkamsandi – 67.38%
Katkamdag – 69.97%
Keredari – 64.04%
Barkagaon – 65.44%
Churchu – 67.97%
Dadi – 70.26%
Source: 2011 Census: CD Block Wise
Primary Census Abstract Data

=== Language and religion ===
Religions in Ichak CD block (2011)
Religion	Percent
Hinduism	91.60%
Islam	8.21%
Other or not stated	0.19%

In 2011, 103,336 (91.60%) of the population was Hindu, 9,262 (8.21%) Muslim. Other religions were 217 (0.19%).

Languages of Ichak CD block (2011)
1. Khortha (85.6%)
2. Hindi (10.8%)
3. Santali (1.92%)
4. Urdu (1.45%)
5. Others (0.29%)

At the time of the 2011 census, 85.56% of the population spoke Khortha, 10.78% Hindi, 1.92% Santali and 1.45% Urdu as their first language.

== Rural poverty ==
40-50% of the population of Hazaribagh district were in the BPL category in 2004–2005, being in the same category as Godda, Giridih and Koderma districts. Rural poverty in Jharkhand declined from 66% in 1993–94 to 46% in 2004–05. In 2011, it has come down to 39.1%.

== Economy ==
=== Livelihood ===
Livelihood
in Ichak CD block
1. Cultivators (45.1%)
2. Agricultural labourers (22.6%)
3. Household industries (3.36%)
4. Other Workers (29.0%)

In Ichak CD block in 2011, amongst the class of total workers, cultivators numbered 17,929 and formed 45.06%, agricultural labourers numbered 8,987 and formed 22.59%, household industry workers numbered 1,335 and formed 3.36% and other workers numbered 11,534 and formed 28.99%. Total workers numbered 39,785 and formed 35.27% of the total population, and non-workers numbered 73,030 and formed 64.37% of the population.

Note: In the census records, a person is considered a cultivator, if the person is engaged in cultivation/ supervision of land owned. When a person who works on another person's land for wages in cash or kind or share, is regarded as an agricultural labourer. Household industry is defined as an industry conducted by one or more members of the family within the household or village, and one that does not qualify for registration as a factory under the Factories Act. Other workers are persons engaged in some economic activity other than cultivators, agricultural labourers and household workers. It includes factory, mining, plantation, transport and office workers, those engaged in business and commerce, teachers, entertainment artistes and so on.

=== Infrastructure ===
There are 88 inhabited villages in Ichak CD block. In 2011, 74 villages had power supply. No village had tap water (treated/ untreated), 6 villages had well water (covered/ uncovered), 84 villages had hand pumps, and all villages had drinking water facility. 10 villages had post offices, 5 villages had sub post offices, 19 villages had telephones (land lines) and 45 villages had mobile phone coverage. 86 villages had pucca (hard top) village roads, 11 villages had bus service (public/ private), 7 villages had autos/ modified autos, and 32 villages had tractors. 9 villages had bank branches, 18 villages had agricultural credit societies, no village had cinema/ video hall, 1 village had public library and public reading room. 34 villages had public distribution system, 6 villages had weekly haat (market) and 47 villages had assembly polling stations.

=== Forestry and agriculture ===
The main occupation of the people of Hazaribagh district is cultivation. While forests occupy around 45% of the total area, the cultivable area forms about 39% of the total area. The forests are uniformly spread across the district. Sal is the predominant species in the jungles. Other species are: bamboo, khair, sali, semal, mahua, tamarind, mango, black-berry (jamun), peepal, karnaj, jack-fruit, margosa (neem), kusum, palas, kend, asan, piar and bhelwa. Hazaribag Wildlife Sanctuary is located around 19 km north of Hazaribag. It covers an area of about 183 km^{2} in Ichak CD Block. Irrigation facilities in this hilly area are inadequate and generally farmers depend on rain for their cultivation. The land situated along the river banks, or low land, is fertile but the uplands are generally barren. May to October is Kharif season, followed by Rabi season. Rice is the main crop of the district. Other important crops grown are: bazra, maize, pulses (mainly arhar and gram) and oilseeds. Limited quantities of cash crops, such as sugar cane, are grown.

=== Backward Regions Grant Fund ===
Hazaribagh district is listed as a backward region and receives financial support from the Backward Regions Grant Fund. The fund, created by the Government of India, is designed to redress regional imbalances in development. As of 2012, 272 districts across the country were listed under this scheme. The list includes 21 districts of Jharkhand.

== Transport ==
National Highway 20 passes through Ichak CD block.

== Education ==
In 2011, amongst the 88 inhabited villages in Ichak CD block, 15 villages had no primary school, 57 villages had one primary school and 16 villages had more than one primary school. 32 villages had at least one primary school and one middle school. 10 villages had at least one middle school and one secondary school. Ichak CD Block has a degree college.

GM Evening College established in 2009 at Ichak is affiliated to the Vinoba Bhave University. It offers courses in arts, science and commerce.

== Healthcare ==
In 2011, amongst the 88 inhabited villages in Ichak CD block, 2 villages had primary health centres, 12 villages had primary health sub-centres, 1 village had maternity and child welfare centres, 1 village had a TB Clinic, 1 village had an allopathic hospital, 2 villages had a dispensary, 1 village had veterinary hospital, 9 villages had medicine shops and 67 villages had no medical facilities.
