= Barkagaon (community development block) =

- Community development block
- Location in Jharkhand Barkagaon (India)
- Coordinates: 23.8553°N 85.2151°E
- Country: India
- State: Jharkhand
- District: Hazaribagh

Government
  - Type: Federal democracy

Area
  - Total: 447.88 km^{2} (172.93 sq mi)
- Elevation: 508 m (1,667 ft)

Population (2011)
  - Total: 136,839
  - Density: 305.53/km^{2} (791.31/sq mi)

Languages
  - Official: Hindi, Urdu
- Time zone: UTC+5:30 (IST)
- PIN: 825311 (Barkagaon)
- Telephone/ STD code: 06551
- Vehicle registration: JH 02
- Lok Sabha constituency: Hazaribagh
- Vidhan Sabha constituency: Barkagaon
- Website: hazaribag.nic.in

Barkagaon is a community development block that forms an administrative division in the Hazaribagh Sadar subdivision of the Hazaribagh district in the Indian state of Jharkhand, with its headquarters at Barkagaon.

== Overview ==
Hazaribagh district is spread over a part of the Chota Nagpur Plateau. The central plateau, averaging a height of 2,000 ft (610 m), occupies the central part of the district. On all sides, except on the western side, it is surrounded by the lower plateau, averaging a height of 1,300 ft (396 m), the surface being undulating. In the north and the north-west the lower plateau forms a fairly level tableland till the ghats, when the height drops to about 700 ft (213 m) and slopes down gradually. The Damodar and the Barakar form the two main watersheds in the district. DVC has constructed the Konar Dam across the Konar River. It is a forested district with cultivation as the main occupation of the people. Coal is the main mineral found in this district. China clay is also found in this district. Inaugurating the Pradhan Mantri Ujjwala Yojana in 2016, Raghubar Das, Chief Minister of Jharkhand, had indicated that there were 23 lakh BPL families in Jharkhand. There was a plan to bring the BPL proportion in the total population down to 35%.

== Maoist activities ==
Right from its inception in 2000. Jharkhand was a “laboratory” for Naxalites to experiment with their ideas of establishing a parallel government. As of 2005, 16 of the 22 districts in the state, including Hazaribagh district, was transformed into a “guerrilla zone”. The movement was not restricted to armed operations but included kangaroo courts called Jan Adalats, elected village bodies and people's police. Jharkhand, with a dense forest cover over a large part of the state, offers a favourable terrain for the Naxalites to build their bases and operate. Annual fatalities in Jharkhand were 117 in 2003 and 150 in 2004. In 2013 Jharkhand was considered one of the two states in the country most affected by Left wing extremism and Jharkhand police set up an exclusive cell to deal with Maoist activities. However, in the same year, when Jharkhand police identified 13 focus areas for combating Maoist extremism, Hazaribagh district was not one of them.

== Geography ==
Barkagaon is located at 23°51′19″N 85°12′54″E. It has an average elevation of 508 metres (1,667 ft).

Barkagaon CD block is bounded by Simaria CD block, in Chatra district, Kakamdag and Sadar, Hazaribagh CD blocks on the north, Churchu and Dadi CD blocks on the east, Patratu CD block, in Ramgarh district, and Burmu CD block, in Ranchi district, on the south and Keredari CD block on the west.

Barkagaon CD block has an area of 447.88 km^{2}. As of 2011, Barkagaon CD Block had 23 gram panchayats, 82 inhabited villages and 1 census town (Urimari).Barkagaon police station and Urimari police outpost serve this CD block. Headquarters of this CD Block is at Barkagaon.

== Demographics ==
=== Population ===
According to the 2011 Census of India, Barkagaon CD block had a total population of 136,839, of which 131,831 were rural and 4,948 were urban. There were 70,358 (51%) males and 66,481 (49%) females. Population in the age range 0–6 years was 22,108. Scheduled Castes numbered 25,521 (18.65%) and Scheduled Tribes numbered 16,866 (12.33%).

Census town in Barkagaon CD block is (2011 census figures in brackets): Urimari (4,948).

Large villages (with 4,000+ population) in Barkagaon CD block are (2011 census figures in brackets): Barkagaon (11,689), Sikri (4,420), Harli (5,723) and Badam (7,025).

=== Literacy ===
As of 2011 census, the total number of literate persons in Barkagaon CD block was 75,084 (65.44% of the population over 6 years) out of which males numbered 44,102 (74.91% of the male population over 6 years) and females numbered 30,982 (55.47% of the female population over 6 years). The gender disparity (the difference between female and male literacy rates) was 19.44%.

As of 2011 census, literacy in Hazaribagh district was 70.48%. Literacy in Jharkhand was 67.63% in 2011. Literacy in India in 2011 was 74.04%.

See also – List of Jharkhand districts ranked by literacy rate

Literacy in CD Blocks of
Hazaribagh district
Barhi subdivision
Chauparan – 69.41%
Barhi – 68.39%
Padma – 68.90%
Barkatha – 61.44%
Chalkusha – 67.13%
Hazaribagh Sadar subdivision
Ichak – 71.87%
Tati Jhariya – 60.68%
Daru – 71.08%
Bishnugarh – 62.04%
Sadar, Hazaribagh – 77.56%
Katkamsandi – 67.38%
Katkamdag – 69.97%
Keredari – 64.04%
Barkagaon – 65.44%
Churchu – 67.97%
Dadi – 70.26%
Source: 2011 Census: CD Block Wise
Primary Census Abstract Data

=== Language and religion ===
Religions in Barkagaon CD block (2011)
Religion	Percent
Hinduism	83.73%
Islam	13.71%
Sarna	1.53%
Christianity	0.93%
Other or not stated	0.10%

In 2011, 114,577 (83.73%) of the population was Hindu, 18,763 (13.71%) Muslim, 1,277 (0.93%) Christian. Other religions were 2,222 (1.62%).

Languages of Barkagaon CD block (2011)
1. Khortha (58.9%)
2. Hindi (24.7%)
3. Urdu (8.24%)
4. Santali (5.55%)
5. Others (2.65%)

At the time of the 2011 census, 58.86% of the population spoke Khortha, 24.70% Hindi, 8.24% Urdu and 5.55% Santali as their first language.

== Rural poverty ==
40-50% of the population of Hazaribagh district were in the BPL category in 2004–2005, being in the same category as Godda, Giridih and Koderma districts. Rural poverty in Jharkhand declined from 66% in 1993–94 to 46% in 2004–05. In 2011, it has come down to 39.1%.

== Economy ==
=== Livelihood ===
Livelihood
in Barkagaon CD block
1. Cultivators (41.3%)
2. Agricultural labourers (32.1%)
3. Household industries (2.89%)
4. Other Workers (23.7%)

In Barkagaon CD block in 2011, amongst the class of total workers, cultivators numbered 21,252 and formed 41.29%, agricultural labourers numbered 16,539 and formed 32.14%, household industry workers numbered 1,488 and formed 2.89% and other workers numbered 12,185 and formed 23.68%. Total workers numbered 51,464 and formed 37.61% of the total population, and non-workers numbered 85,375 and formed 62.39% of the population.

Note: In the census records, a person is considered a cultivator, if the person is engaged in cultivation/ supervision of land owned. When a person who works on another person's land for wages in cash or kind or share, is regarded as an agricultural labourer. Household industry is defined as an industry conducted by one or more members of the family within the household or village, and one that does not qualify for registration as a factory under the Factories Act. Other workers are persons engaged in some economic activity other than cultivators, agricultural labourers and household workers. It includes factory, mining, plantation, transport and office workers, those engaged in business and commerce, teachers, entertainment artistes and so on.

=== Infrastructure ===
There are 82 inhabited villages in Barkagaon CD block. In 2011, 67 villages had power supply. 8 villages had tap water (treated/ untreated), 82 villages had well water (covered/ uncovered), 78 villages had hand pumps, and all villages had drinking water facility. 7 villages had post offices, 8 villages had sub post offices, 10 villages had telephones (land lines) and 41 villages had mobile phone coverage. 81 villages had pucca (hard top) village roads, 13 villages had bus service (public/ private), 10 villages had autos/ modified autos, and 46 villages had tractors. 5 villages had bank branches, 4 villages had agricultural credit societies, no village had cinema/ video hall, 1 village had public library and public reading room. 48 villages had public distribution system, 13 villages had weekly haat (market) and 44 villages had assembly polling stations.

=== Forestry and agriculture ===
The main occupation of the people of Hazaribagh district is cultivation. While forests occupy around 45% of the total area, the cultivable area forms about 39% of the total area. The forests are uniformly spread across the district. Sal is the predominant species in the jungles. Other species are: bamboo, khair, sali, semal, mahua, tamarind, mango, black-berry (jamun), peepal, karnaj, jack-fruit, margosa (neem), kusum, palas, kend, asan, piar and bhelwa. Hazaribag Wildlife Sanctuary is located around 19 km north of Hazaribag. Irrigation facilities in this hilly area are inadequate and generally farmers depend on rain for their cultivation. The land situated along the river banks, or low land, is fertile but the uplands are generally barren. May to October is Kharif season, followed by Rabi season. Rice is the main crop of the district. Other important crops grown are: bazra, maize, pulses (mainly arhar and gram) and oilseeds. Limited quantities of cash crops, such as sugar cane, are grown.

=== Coal mining ===
With large coal deposits in the Barkagaon and Charhi areas of North Karanpura Coalfield coming up, coal mining is becoming a major employment provider in Hazaribagh district.

Projects in the Hazaribag Area of Central Coalfields are: Parej East OC, Kedla UG, Kedla OC, Tapin OC, Jharkhand OC, Kedla Washery and Regional R/Workshop.

Central Coalfields Limited has plans for a large number of collieries covering villages Chepa Khurd, Chepa Kalyan, Jugra, Langatu, Pakri Barwadih, Uperi Darhi, Lokura, Chandaul, Ambajit, Nayatanr, Simradih, Moitra, Badam, Babupara, Gondalpura, Gali, Balodar, Napo Kalyan, Napo Khurd, Isko, Larunga, Bandu and others. NTPC Limited is involved in coal mining in the area.

NTPC is constructing the 3 X 660 MW North Karanpura Thermal Power Station at Tandwa in Chatra district and coal for the plant would go from adjacent Barkagaon CD block and Keredari CD block.

=== Backward Regions Grant Fund ===
Hazaribagh district is listed as a backward region and receives financial support from the Backward Regions Grant Fund. The fund, created by the Government of India, is designed to redress regional imbalances in development. As of 2012, 272 districts across the country were listed under this scheme. The list includes 21 districts of Jharkhand.

== Transport ==
State Highway 7 (Jharkhand) passes through this block.

== Education ==
In 2011, amongst the 82 inhabited villages in Barkagaon CD block, 8 villages had no primary school, 54 villages had one primary school and 20 villages had more than one primary school. 43 villages had at least one primary school and one middle school. 8 villages had at least one middle school and one secondary school. Barkagaon CD block has a degree college.

Karnpura College, a degree college, established in 1983 at Barkagaon, is affiliated to Vinoba Bhave University. It offers courses in arts, commerce and science. It also offers free education to girls and free bus services to all students.

== Healthcare ==
In 2011, amongst the 82 inhabited villages in Barkagaon CD block, 2 villages had community health centres, 6 villages had primary health centres, 13 villages had primary health sub-centres, 7 villages had maternity and child welfare centres, 1 village had a TB Clinic, 4 villages had allopathic hospitals, 2 villages had alternative medicine hospitals, 4 villages had dispensaries, 2 villages had veterinary hospitals, 8 villages had medicine shops and 55 villages had no medical facilities.
