= Tati Jhariya =

- Village
- Location in Jharkhand, India Tati Jhariya (India)
- Coordinates: 24.0221633°N 85.6198025°E
- Country: India
- State: Jharkhand
- District: Hazaribagh

Population (2011)
  - Total: 2,287

Languages (*For language details see Tati Jhariya (community development block)#Language and religion)
  - Official: Hindi, Urdu
- Time zone: UTC+5:30 (IST)
- PIN: 825313 (Daru)
- Telephone code: 06557
- Vehicle registration: JH 02
- Website: hazaribag.nic.in

Tati Jhariya is a panchayat village in the Tati Jhariya CD block in the Hazaribagh Sadar subdivision of the Hazaribagh district in the Indian state of Jharkhand.

== Geography ==
Cities, towns and locations in Hazaribagh district in North Chotanagpur Division
Some census towns and locations around Hazaribagh city have been shown in the Hazaribagh City map
M: municipality, CT: census town, R: rural/ urban centre, T: tourist centre, D: dam, HS: hot spring
Owing to space constraints in the small map, the actual locations in a larger map may vary slightly

=== Location ===
Tati Jhariya is located at 24°01′20″N 85°37′11″E.

Census villages under Tati Jhariya panchayat are: Jharia, Holang, Murumatu, Sadaro, Khapia, Murko, Bisai and Tati.

Siwani River, a tributary of Konar River, flows past Tati Jhariya.

=== Area overview ===
Hazaribagh district is a plateau area and forests occupy around about 45% of the total area. It is a predominantly rural area with 92.34% of the population living in rural areas against 7.66% in the urban areas. There are many census towns in the district, as can be seen in the map alongside. Agriculture is the main occupation of the people but with the extension of coal mines, particularly in the southern part of the district, employment in coal mines is increasing. However, it has to be borne in mind that modern mining operations are highly mechanised. Four operational areas of Central Coalfields are marked on the map. All these areas are spread across partly this district and partly the neighbouring districts.

Note: The map alongside presents some of the notable locations in the district. All places marked in the map are linked in the larger full screen map. Urbanisation data calculated on the basis of census data for CD blocks and may vary a little against unpublished official data.

== Civic administration ==
=== Police station ===
Tati Jhariya police station serves the Tati Jhariya CD block.

=== CD block HQ ===
The headquarters of Tati Jhariya CD block are located at Tati Jhariya.

== Demographics ==
According to the 2011 Census of India, Tati had a rural population of 286. There were 146 males and 140 females. Scheduled Tribes numbered 274. Jharia had a rural population of 2,001. There were 1,066 males and 935 females. Scheduled Castes numbered 285 and Scheduled Tribes numbered 43.

== Literacy ==
As of 2011 census, the total number of literate persons in Jharia was 1,218 out of which 727 were males and 491 were females. The total number of literates in Tati was 113 out of which 64 were males and 49 were females.

== Cuisine ==
Found in Tati Jhariya is a sweet meat delicacy, Gulab jamun.

== Transport ==
Tati Jhariya is 26 kilometres (16 mi) from Hazaribagh and 15 kilometres (9.3 mi) from Bagodar.
