= Daru-Kharika =

- Village
- Location in Jharkhand, India Daru-Kharika (India)
- Coordinates: 24°1′0″N 85°33′0″E
- Country: India
- State: Jharkhand
- District: Hazaribagh
- Elevation: 548 m (1,798 ft)

Languages (*For language details see Daru (community development block)#Language and religion)
  - Official: Hindi, Urdu
- Time zone: UTC+5:30 (IST)
- PIN: 825313 (Daru)
- Telephone/ STD code: 06546
- Vehicle registration: JH 02
- Coastline: 0 kilometres (0 mi)
- Website: hazaribag.nic.in

Daru-Kharika is a village in the Daru CD block in the Hazaribagh Sadar subdivision of the Hazaribagh district in Jharkhand state of India.

== Geography ==
It is located at 24°1′0″N 85°33′0″E at an elevation of 548 m above MSL.

== Location ==
National Highway 100 passes through it. It is at a distance of 20 km from Hazaribagh. The nearest airport is Ranchi Airport.

== Demographics ==
According to the 2011 Census of India, Darukharika had a population of 1,349. There were 681 males and 661 females. Scheduled Castes numbered 87. Daru, an adjacent village, had a population of 4,681. There were 2,409 males and 2,272 females. Scheduled Castes numbered 1,106.

=== Literacy ===
As per 2011 census the total number of literate persons in Darukharika was 935 out of which 526 were males and 409 were females. The total number of literates in Daru was 2,943 out of which 1,714 were males and 1,229 were female.
