= Daru (surname) =

Daru is a surname. Notable people with the surname include:

- Barnabas Daru (fl. 2000s–2020s), Nigerian-American plant ecologist and biogeographer
- Phil Daru (born 1988), American former mixed martial artist and college football player
- Pierre Daru (1767–1829), French soldier, statesman, historian, and poet
