= Chauparan (community development block) =

- Community development block
- Location in Jharkhand, India Chauparan (India)
- Coordinates: 24.3870°N 85.2532°E
- Country: India
- State: Jharkhand
- District: Hazaribagh

Government
  - Type: Federal democracy

Area
  - Total: 482.37 km^{2} (186.24 sq mi)
- Elevation: 508 m (1,667 ft)

Population (2011)
  - Total: 161,814
  - Density: 335.46/km^{2} (868.83/sq mi)

Languages
  - Official: Hindi, Urdu
- Time zone: UTC+5:30 (IST)
- PIN: 825406 (Chauparan)
- Telephone/ STD code: 06547
- Vehicle registration: JH 02
- Lok Sabha constituency: Hazaribagh
- Vidhan Sabha constituency: Barhi
- Website: hazaribag.nic.in

Chauparan is a community development block (CD block) that forms an administrative division in the Barhi subdivision of the Hazaribagh district in the Indian state of Jharkhand.

== Overview ==
Hazaribagh district is spread over a part of the Chota Nagpur Plateau. The central plateau, averaging a height of 2,000 ft (610 m), occupies the central part of the district. On all sides, except on the western side, it is surrounded by the lower plateau, averaging a height of 1,300 ft (396 m), the surface being undulating. In the north and the north-west the lower plateau forms a fairly level tableland till the ghats, when the height drops to about 700 ft (213 m) and slopes down gradually. The Damodar and the Barakar form the two main watersheds in the district. DVC has constructed the Konar Dam across the Konar River. It is a forested district with cultivation as the main occupation of the people. Coal is the main mineral found in this district. China clay is also found in this district. Inaugurating the Pradhan Mantri Ujjwala Yojana in 2016, Raghubar Das, Chief Minister of Jharkhand, had indicated that there were 23 lakh BPL families in Jharkhand. There was a plan to bring the BPL proportion in the total population down to 35%.

== Maoist activities ==
Right from its inception in 2000. Jharkhand was a “laboratory” for Naxalites to experiment with their ideas of establishing a parallel government. As of 2005, 16 of the 22 districts in the state, including Hazaribagh district, was transformed into a “guerrilla zone”. The movement was not restricted to armed operations but included kangaroo courts called Jan Adalats, elected village bodies and people's police. Jharkhand, with a dense forest cover over a large part of the state, offers a favourable terrain for the Naxalites to build their bases and operate. Annual fatalities in Jharkhand were 117 in 2003 and 150 in 2004. In 2013 Jharkhand was considered one of the two states in the country most affected by Left wing extremism and Jharkhand police set up an exclusive cell to deal with Maoist activities. However, in the same year, when Jharkhand police identified 13 focus areas for combating Maoist extremism, Hazaribagh district was not one of them.

== Geography ==
Chauparan is located at 24.3870°N 85.2532°E. It has an average elevation of 508 metres (1,667 ft).

Chauparan CD block is bounded by Imamganj CD block, in Gaya district of Bihar, on a part of the west and a part of the north, Chandwara CD block, in Koderma district, on a part of the north and a part of the east, Barhi CD block on a part of the east, Itkhori and Mayurhand CD blocks, in Chatra district, on the south and Kanhachatti CD block, in Chatra district, on a small stretch on the west.

Chauparan CD block has an area of 482.37 km^{2}. As of 2011, Chauparan CD block had 26 gram panchayats, 233 inhabited villages and 1 census town (Chauparan).Chauparan police station serves this CD block, Headquarters of this CD block is at Chauparan.

== Demographics ==
=== Population ===
According to the 2011 Census of India, Chauparan CD block had a total population of 161,814, of which 156,453 were rural and 5,361 were urban. There were 80.985 (50%) males and 80,829 (50%) females. Population in the age range 0-6 years was 29,802. Scheduled Castes numbered 41,933 (25.91%) and Scheduled Tribes numbered 4,101 (2.53%).

The only Census town in Chauparan CD block is (2011 census figure in brackets): Chauparan

There is only one large village (with 4,000+ population) in Chauparan CD block: (2011 census figures in brackets): Chai Kalan (4,285)

=== Literacy ===
As of 2011 census, the total number of literate persons in Chauparan CD block was 91,623 (69.41% of the population over 6 years) out of which males numbered 52,232 (79.53% of the male population over 6 years) and females numbered 39,391 (59.38% of the female population over 6 years). The gender disparity (the difference between female and male literacy rates) was 20.15%.

As of 2011 census, literacy in Hazaribagh district was 70.48%. Literacy in Jharkhand was 67.63% in 2011. Literacy in India in 2011 was 74.04%.

See also – List of Jharkhand districts ranked by literacy rate

Literacy in CD Blocks of
Hazaribagh district
Barhi subdivision
Chauparan – 69.41%
Barhi – 68.39%
Padma – 68.90%
Barkatha – 61.44%
Chalkusha – 67.13%
Hazaribagh Sadar subdivision
Ichak – 71.87%
Tati Jhariya – 60.68%
Daru – 71.08%
Bishnugarh – 62.04%
Sadar, Hazaribagh – 77.56%
Katkamsandi – 67.38%
Katkamdag – 69.97%
Keredari – 64.04%
Barkagaon – 65.44%
Churchu – 67.97%
Dadi – 70.26%
Source: 2011 Census: CD Block Wise
Primary Census Abstract Data

=== Language and religion ===
Religions in Chauparan Block (2011)
Religion	Percent
Hindus	83.99%
Muslims	15.00%
Christians	0.71%
Other or not stated	0.30%

Languages of Chauparan block (2011)
1. Khortha (55.1%)
2. Hindi (33.2%)
3. Urdu (7.81%)
4. Magahi (2.01%)
5. Mundari (1.47%)
6. Others (0.41%)

At the time of the 2011 census, 55.11% of the population spoke Khortha, 33.19% Hindi, 7.81% Urdu, 2.01% Magahi and 1.47% Mundari as their first language.

== Rural poverty ==
40-50% of the population of Hazaribagh district were in the BPL category in 2004–2005, being in the same category as Godda, Giridih and Koderma districts. Rural poverty in Jharkhand declined from 66% in 1993–94 to 46% in 2004–05. In 2011, it has come down to 39.1%.

== Economy ==
=== Livelihood ===
Livelihood
in Chauparan CD block
1. Cultivators (45.9%)
2. Agricultural labourers (28.4%)
3. Household industries (2.40%)
4. Other Workers (23.3%)

In Chauparan CD block in 2011, amongst the class of total workers, cultivators numbered 31,561 and formed 45.92%, agricultural labourers numbered 19,543 and formed 28.43%, household industry workers numbered 1,648 and formed 2.40% and other workers numbered 15,985 and formed 23.26%. Total workers numbered 68,737 and formed 42.48% of the total population, and non-workers numbered 93,077 and formed 57.52% of the population.

Note: In the census records a person is considered a cultivator, if the person is engaged in cultivation/ supervision of land owned. When a person who works on another person's land for wages in cash or kind or share, is regarded as an agricultural labourer. Household industry is defined as an industry conducted by one or more members of the family within the household or village, and one that does not qualify for registration as a factory under the Factories Act. Other workers are persons engaged in some economic activity other than cultivators, agricultural labourers and household workers. It includes factory, mining, plantation, transport and office workers, those engaged in business and commerce, teachers, entertainment artistes and so on.

=== Infrastructure ===
There are 233 inhabited villages in Chauparan CD block. In 2011, 183 villages had power supply. 15 villages had tap water (treated/ untreated), 8 villages had well water (covered/ uncovered), 229 villages had hand pumps, and 2 villages had no drinking water facility. 11 villages had post offices, 14 villages had sub post offices, 12 villages had telephones (land lines) and 88 villages had mobile phone coverage. 221 villages had pucca (hard top) village roads, 25 villages had bus service (public/ private), 11 villages had autos/ modified autos, and 105 villages had tractors. 5 villages had bank branches, 7 villages had agricultural credit societies, 1 village had cinema/ video hall, 2 villages had public library and public reading rooms. 97 villages had public distribution system, 9 villages had weekly haat (market) and 95 villages had assembly polling stations.

=== Forestry and agriculture ===
The main occupation of the people of Hazaribagh district is cultivation. While forests occupy around 45% of the total area, the cultivable area forms about 39% of the total area. The forests are uniformly spread across the district. Sal is the predominant species in the jungles. Other species are: bamboo, khair, sali, semal, mahua, tamarind, mango, black-berry (jamun), peepal, karnaj, jack-fruit, margosa (neem), kusum, palas, kend, asan, piar and bhelwa. Hazaribag Wildlife Sanctuary is located around 19 km north of Hazaribag. Irrigation facilities in this hilly area are inadequate and generally farmers depend on rain for their cultivation. The land situated along the river banks, or low land, is fertile but the uplands are generally barren. May to October is Kharif season, followed by Rabi season. Rice is the main crop of the district. Other important crops grown are: bazra, maize, pulses (mainly arhar and gram) and oilseeds. Limited quantities of cash crops, such as sugar cane, are grown.

=== Backward Regions Grant Fund ===
Hazaribagh district is listed as a backward region and receives financial support from the Backward Regions Grant Fund. The fund, created by the Government of India, is designed to redress regional imbalances in development. As of 2012, 272 districts across the country were listed under this scheme. The list includes 21 districts of Jharkhand.

== Transport ==
Chauparan-Chatra Road meets National Highway 19 (old NH 2) / Grand Trunk Road at Chauparan.

== Education ==
In 2011, amongst the 233 inhabited villages in Chauparan CD block, 82 villages had no primary school, 107 villages had one primary school and 44 villages had more than one primary school. 60 villages had at least one primary school and one middle school. 22 villages had at least one middle school and one secondary school.

== Healthcare ==
In 2011, amongst the 233 inhabited villages in Chauparan CD block, 1 village had a community health centre, 2 villages had primary health centres, 13 villages had primary health sub-centres, 3 villages had maternity and child welfare centres, 5 villages had allopathic hospitals, 6 villages had alternative medicine hospitals, 4 village had dispensaries, 17 villages had medicine shops and 169 villages had no medical facilities.
