= Hazaribagh district =

Coordinates: 24°00′N 85°15′E

- District of Jharkhand
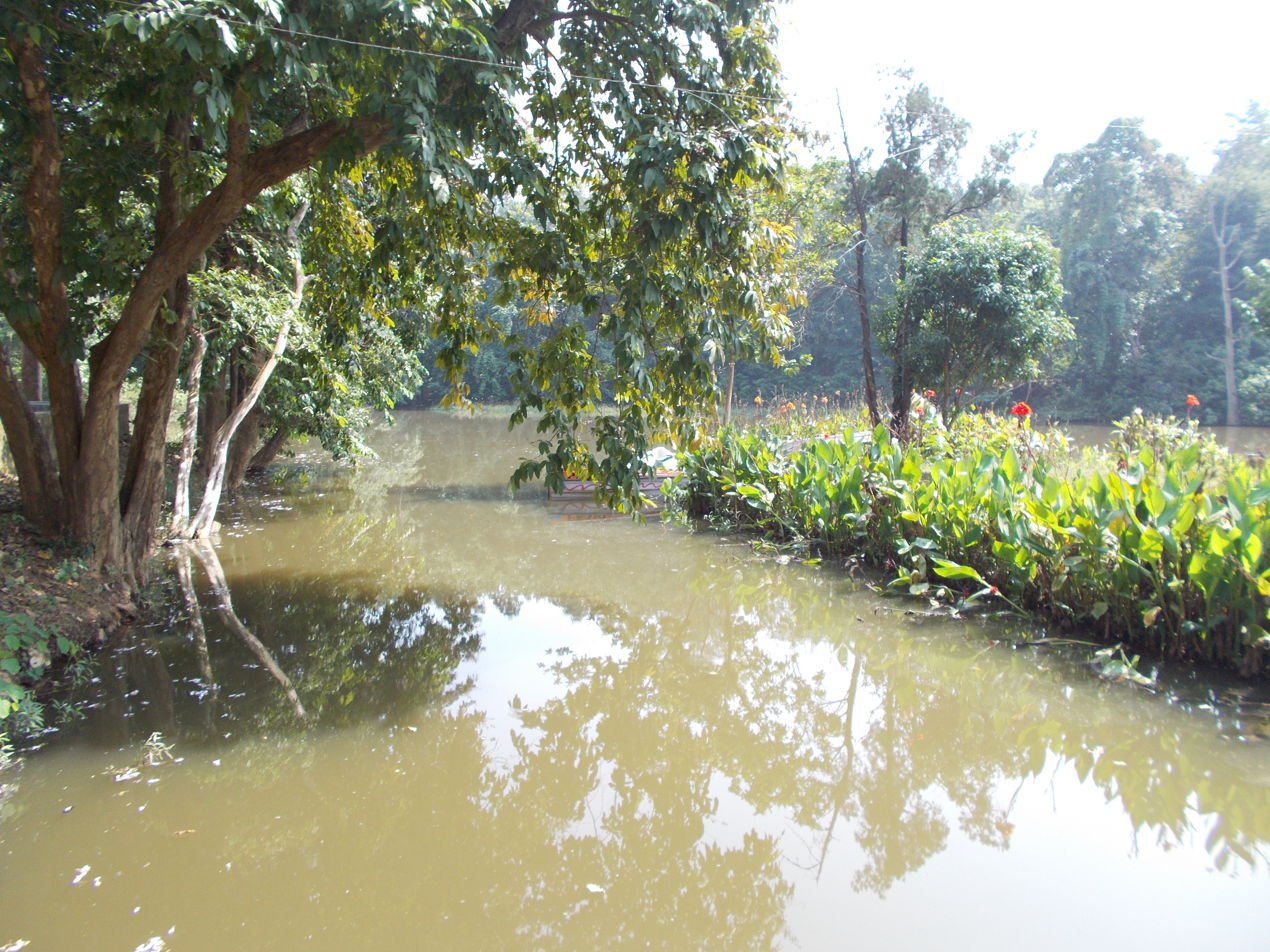
- Hazaribagh forest area, Lake in Hazaribagh Wildlife Sanctuary
- Interactive map of Hazaribagh district
- Country: India
- State: Jharkhand
- Division: North Chotanagpur
- Headquarters: Hazaribagh

Government
  - Deputy Commissioner: Shri Hemant Sati (IAS)
  - Superintendent of police: Shri Aman Kumar (IPS)
  - Lok Sabha constituencies: Hazaribagh (shared with Ramgarh district)
  - Vidhan Sabha constituencies: 5 ( Sadar, Barhi, Barkagaon, Barkathha, Mandu)

Area
  - Total: 3,555 km^{2} (1,373 sq mi)

Population (2011)
  - Total: 1,734,495
  - Density: 487.9/km^{2} (1,264/sq mi)

Languages
  - Official: Hindi
  - Additional official: Urdu and English
  - Other: Khortha and Santali

Demographics
  - Literacy: 69.75%
  - Sex ratio: 946
- Time zone: UTC+05:30 (IST)
- Vehicle registration: JH-02
- Major highways: NH 19 NH 20 NH 522
- Website: hazaribag.nic.in

Hazaribagh district is one of the oldest districts of Jharkhand state, India and the district headquarters is located in Hazaribagh town. It is located in the north east part of North Chotanagpur Division. The boundary of this district consists of districts of Gaya (BIHAR) and Koderma in the north, Giridih and Bokaro in the east, Ramgarh in the south and Chatra in the west.

== Etymology ==
The district is named after its headquarters, the town of Hazaribagh. The name, Hazaribagh consists of two Persian words, hazar meaning "one thousand", and bagh meaning "garden" - so, the literal meaning of Hazaribagh is 'a city of one thousand gardens'. According to Sir John Houlton, a veteran British administrator, the town takes its name from the small villages of Okni and Hazari – shown in old maps as Ocunhazry. The last syllable in its name probably originated in a mango-grove, which formed a camping ground for troops and travellers marching along the ‘new military road’ from Kolkata to Varanasi, constructed in 1782 and the following years.

== History ==
There are ancient Cave Paintings in Isko, Hazaribagh district which are from Meso-chalcolithic period (9,000-5,000 BC). There is a group of megaliths found close to Barkagaon that is about 25 km from Hazaribagh town at Punkri Barwadih, which has been proven to date back to beyond 3000 BCE.

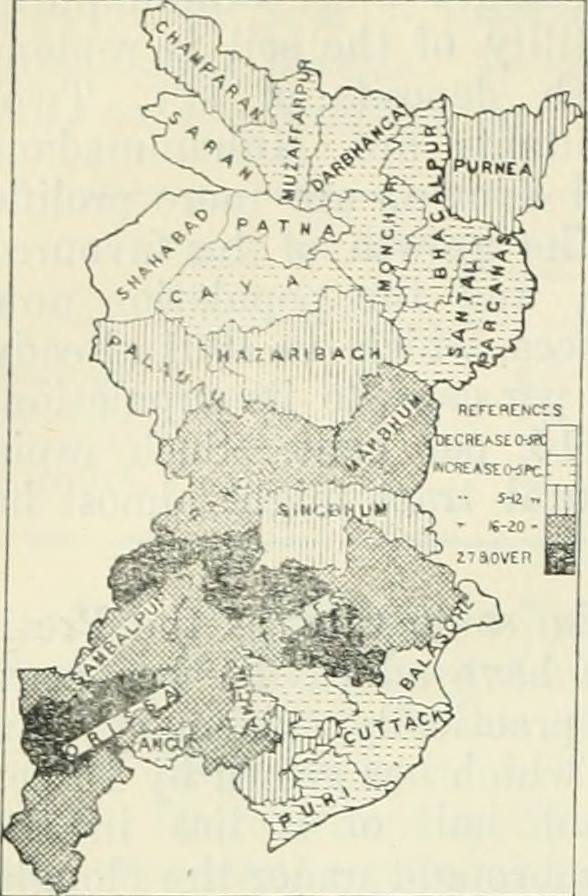
Hazaribagh region in the center of Bihar and Orissa province, 1912 map of British India

The blue-shaded area (except Dhanbad and part of Bokaro) of current district map of Jharkhand, represents the historical Hazaribagh district from which other districts were carved out.

In 1872, Hazaribagh district had area of 7,021 square miles (18,180 km^{2}) with 771,875 inhabitants. After that many area of the district are curved out as separate district, viz, On 6 December 1972, Giridih district was split from Hazaribagh. In 1999 this happened again with the creation of Chatra and Koderma. Hazaribagh left Bihar when Jharkhand was formed on 15 November 2000. On 12 September 2007, yet another district was created from Hazaribagh's territory: Ramgarh.

== Economy ==
Coal is the major mineral found in this district. This significant coal deposit reserves of this district include Charhi, Kuju, Ghato Tand and Barkagaon of North Karanpura Coalfield. The coal mines are the main source of livelihood for the residents of this district. People of this district are known to be very hard working.

Patratu and Bhurkunda was also coal mines areas of Hazaribagh but it is now in Ramgarh district.

In 2006, the Indian government named Hazaribagh one of the country's 250 most backward districts (out of a total of 640). It is one of the 21 districts in Jharkhand currently receiving funds from the Backward Regions Grant Fund Programme (BRGF).

== Administration ==
=== Blocks/Mandals ===
Hazaribag district consists of 16 Blocks. The following are the list of the Blocks in Hazaribagh district:

1. Barhi Block
2. Dadi Block
3. Barkatha Block
4. Daru Block
5. Bishnugarh Block
6. Katkamdag Block
7. Barkagaon Block
8. Katkamsandi Block
9. Chauparan Block
10. Ichak Block
11. Padma Block
12. Churchu Block
13. Sadar Block
14. Chalkusha Block
15. Tati Jhariya Block
16. Keredari Block

The district is divided into two sub-divisions: Hazaribagh and Barhi.

Hazaribagh sub-division comprises 11 blocks: Sadar, Hazaribagh, Katkamsandi, Bishnugarh, Barkagaon, Keredari, Ichak, Churchu, Daru, Tati Jhariya, Katkamdag and Dadi.

Barhi sub-division comprises 5 blocks: Padma, Barhi, Chauparan, Barkatha and Chalkusha.

== Demographics ==
Historical population

Year	Pop.	±%
1901	241,612	—
1911	264,297	+9.4%
1921	261,915	−0.9%
1931	311,227	+18.8%
1941	359,218	+15.4%
1951	397,342	+10.6%

Year	Pop.	±%
1961	498,034	+25.3%
1971	643,086	+29.1%
1981	854,377	+32.9%
1991	1,101,171	+28.9%
2001	1,378,881	+25.2%
2011	1,734,495	+25.8%

Source: Census of India

According to the 2011 census, Hazaribagh district has a population of 1,734,495, roughly equal to the nation of The Gambia or the US state of Nebraska. This gives it a ranking of 279th in India (out of a total of 640). The district has a population density of 488 inhabitants per square kilometre (1,260/sq mi). Its population growth rate over the decade 2001-2011 was 25.75%. Hazaribagh has a sex ratio of 946 females for every 1000 males, and a literacy rate of 69.75%. 15.87% of the population lives in urban areas. Scheduled Castes and Scheduled Tribes make up 17.50% and 7.02% of the total population respectively.

Religion in Hazaribagh district (2011)
Religion	Percent
Hinduism	80.56%
Islam	16.21%
Sarna	1.97%
Christianity	0.99%
Other or not stated	0.27%

Hindus make up 80.56% of the population, while Muslims make up 16.21%. Sarna makes 1.97% of the population, Christians are 0.99%.

Languages of Hazaribagh district (2011)
1. Khortha (61.6%)
2. Hindi (23.6%)
3. Urdu (7.73%)
4. Santali (3.48%)
5. Others (Including Bengali, Bhojpuri, Nagpuri) (3.62%)

At the time of the 2011 Census of India, 61.58% of the population in the district spoke Khortha, 23.59% Hindi, 7.73% Urdu and 3.48% Santali as their first language. There is also a small population of Bengali speaking community who are one of the early settlers of the region.

== Politics ==
District	No.	Constituency	Name	Party	Alliance	Remarks	Hazaribagh	20	Barkatha	Amit Kumar Yadav
21	Barhi	Manoj Kumar Yadav					Hazaribagh			
Hazaribagh	24	Mandu	Nirmal Mahto	AJSU	NDA					
Hazaribagh	25	Hazaribagh	Pradip Prasad	BJP	NDA					

There are 4 Vidhan Sabha constituencies in this district: Barkatha, Barhi, Mandu and Hazaribagh. All of these are part of Hazaribagh Lok Sabha constituency.

== See also ==
- Hazaribagh
- Charowa dam
