= Magadh Sanghamitra Area =

- Location in Jharkhand Magadh Sanghamitra Area (India)
- Location: North Karanpura Coalfield; 23.8442°N 84.9885°E
- Company: Central Coalfields Limited
- Website: centralcoalfields.in/cmpny/hstry.php

Magadh Sanghamitra Area is one of the operational areas of the Central Coalfields Limited located in the Tandwa CD block in the Chatra district and Balumath CD block in the Latehar district in the state of Jharkhand, India.

== Overview ==
North Karanpura Coalfield has reserves of 14 billion tonnes of coal (proved, indicated and inferred), around 9% of India's total coal reserves, placing it among the biggest coalfields in India. Only a small corner of this coalfield was exploited earlier.

Future mega projects in the area include: Magadh opencast project expansion with nominal capacity of 51 million tonnes per year and peak capacity of 70 million tonnes per year, Amrapali OCP expansion with nominal capacity 25 MTY and peak capacity of 35 MTY, Sanghamitra OCP with nominal capacity of 20 MTY and peak capacity of 27 MTY, and Chandragupta OCP with nominal capacity of 15 MTY and peak capacity of 20 MTY.

== Mining activity ==
Collieries in the North Karanpura Coalfield except the North Karanpura Area
U: Underground colliery, O: Open Cast colliery, A: Administrative headquarters, CT: census town, R: rural/urban centre
Location of new mine sites are approximate
Owing to space constraints in the small map, the actual locations in a larger map may vary slightly
Cities, towns and locations in Chatra district in North Chotanagpur Division
M: municipality, CT: census town, R: rural/ urban centre, H: historical/ religious centre, P: power plant, T: tourist centre
Abbreviation used - TPS: thermal power station
Owing to space constraints in the small map, the actual locations in a larger map may vary slightly

=== Mines and projects ===
Magadh Opencast Project was identified for a rated capacity of 12.0 million tonnes per year for supplying coal to the North Karanpura Thermal Power Station (3X660 MW) of NTPC Limited at Tandwa. Estimated mineable reserve of Magadh OCP was 351 million tonnes. It is operating in 4 coal blocks: Magadh, Tandwa, Dumargarh and Karimati. The area has flat terrain with gentle undulation. The maximum elevation is 509 metres (1,670 ft) in the northern side of the block. The minimum elevation is 464 metres (1,522 ft) near the southern block boundary. It started operations in 2015. It is linked with Tandwa by a 12 km long fair-weather kutcha (unpaved) road.

In July 2020, Central Coalfields Limited invited bids for development and operationalisation of Sanghamitra OCP. Duration of the contract is 25 years.

== Medical facilities ==
In the North Karanpura Coalfield, CCL has the following facilities:

Central Hospital at Dakra with 50 beds has 11 general duty medical officers and 1 specialist. Among the facilities are: X‐Ray, ECG, Semi auto analyzer, monitor defibrillator, dental chair. It has 2 ambulances.

Piparwar Hospital at Bachra with 11 beds has 6 general duty medical officers and 1 specialist. Among the facilities it has are: cardiac monitor, suction machine, X-Ray machine and ECG. It has 4 ambulances.

There are central facilities in the Central Hospital, Gandhinagar at Kanke Road, Ranchi with 250 beds and in the Central Hospital, Naisarai at Ramgarh with 150 beds.

There are dispensaries at Rohini, KDH, Purnadih/ Karkatta in North Karanapura Area, at Amrapali Project, Magadh Project in the Magadh Sanghamitra Area, at Tetariakhad in the Rajhara Area.
