= Kadma, Hazaribagh =

Kadma Kadma II
- Census Town
- Location in Jharkhand, India Kadma (India)
- Coordinates: 24.001389°N 85.326358°E
- Country: India
- State: Jharkhand
- District: Hazaribagh

Government
  - Type: Federal democracy

Area
  - Total: 2.34 km^{2} (0.90 sq mi)

Population (2011)
  - Total: 7,239
  - Density: 3,090/km^{2} (8,010/sq mi)

Languages (*For language details see Katkamdag (community development block)#Language and religion)
  - Official: Hindi, Urdu
- Time zone: UTC+5:30 (IST)
- PIN: 825302
- Telephone/ STD code: 06546
- Vehicle registration: JH 02
- Lok Sabha constituency: Hazaribagh
- Vidhan Sabha constituency: Hazaribagh
- Website: hazaribag.nic.in

Kadma (referred to in census records as Kadma II) is a census town in the Katkamdag CD block in the Hazaribagh Sadar subdivision of the Hazaribagh district in the Indian state of Jharkhand.

== Geography ==
Hazaribagh City
CT: census town, R: rural/ urban centre, T: tourist centre, C: educational centre, F: facility
Owing to space constraints in the small map, the actual locations in a larger map may vary slightly

=== Location ===
Kadma is located at 24.001389°N 85.326358°E.

== Demographics ==
According to the 2011 Census of India, Kadma (location code 368710) had a total population of 7,239, of which 3,778 (52%) were males and 3,461 (48%) were females. Population in the age range 0–6 years was 947. The total number of literate persons in Kadma was 5,449 (86.60% of the population over 6 years).

== Infrastructure ==
According to the District Census Handbook 2011, Hazaribagh, Kadma No. II covered an area of 2.34 km^{2}. Among the civic amenities, it had 8 km roads with both open and covered drains, the protected water supply involved uncovered well, hand pump. It had 1,202 domestic electric connections. Among the educational facilities it had 4 primary schools, 3 middle schools, other educational facilities at Hazaribagh 5 km away.

== Transport ==
Hazaribagh Town railway station on the Koderma–Hazaribagh–Barkakana–Ranchi line is located nearby.
