= Sadar, Hazaribagh (community development block) =

- Community development block
- Location in Jharkhand Sadar, Hazaribagh (India)
- Coordinates: 24°1′46″N 85°27′26″E
- Country: India
- State: Jharkhand
- District: Hazaribagh

Government
  - Type: Federal democracy

Area
  - Total: 232.91 km^{2} (89.93 sq mi)

Population (2011)
  - Total: 147,601
  - Density: 633.73/km^{2} (1,641.3/sq mi)

Languages
  - Official: Hindi, Urdu
- Time zone: UTC+5:30 (IST)
- PIN: 825301 (Hazariagh)
- Telephone code: 06546
- Vehicle registration: JH 02
- Lok Sabha constituency: Hazaribagh
- Vidhan Sabha constituency: Hazaribagh
- Website: hazaribag.nic.in

Sadar, Hazaribagh is a community development block (CD block) that forms an administrative division in the Hazaribagh Sadar subdivision of the Hazaribagh district in the Indian state of Jharkhand.

== Overview ==
Hazaribagh district is spread over a part of the Chota Nagpur Plateau. The central plateau, averaging a height of 2,000 ft (610 m), occupies the central part of the district. On all sides, except on the western side, it is surrounded by the lower plateau, averaging a height of 1,300 ft (396 m), the surface being undulating. In the north and the north-west the lower plateau forms a fairly level tableland till the ghats, when the height drops to about 700 ft (213 m) and slopes down gradually. The Damodar and the Barakar form the two main watersheds in the district. DVC has constructed the Konar Dam across the Konar River. It is a forested district with cultivation as the main occupation of the people. Coal is the main mineral found in this district. China clay is also found in this district. Inaugurating the Pradhan Mantri Ujjwala Yojana in 2016, Raghubar Das, Chief Minister of Jharkhand, had indicated that there were 23 lakh BPL families in Jharkhand. There was a plan to bring the BPL proportion in the total population down to 35%.

== Maoist activities ==
Right from its inception in 2000. Jharkhand was a “laboratory” for Naxalites to experiment with their ideas of establishing a parallel government. As of 2005, 16 of the 22 districts in the state, including Hazaribagh district, was transformed into a “guerrilla zone”. The movement was not restricted to armed operations but included kangaroo courts called Jan adalats, elected village bodies and people's police. Jharkhand, with a dense forest cover over a large part of the state, offers a favourable terrain for the Naxalites to build their bases and operate. Annual fatalities in Jharkhand were 117 in 2003 and 150 in 2004. In 2013 Jharkhand was considered one of the two states in the country most affected by Left wing extremism and Jharkhand police set up an exclusive cell to deal with Maoist activities. However, in the same year, when Jharkhand police identified 13 focus areas for combating Maoist extremism, Hazaribagh district was not one of them.

== Geography ==
Meru, a constituent census town in Sadar, Hazaribagh CD block, is located at 24°1′46″N 85°27′26″E.

Sadar, Hazaribagh CD block is bounded by Ichak CD block on the north, Daru CD block on the east, Churchu and Barkagaon CD blocks on the south, and Katkamdag and Katkamsandi CD blocks on the west.

Sadar, Hazaribagh CD block has an area of 232.91 km^{2}. As of 2011, Sadar, Hazaribagh CD block had 25 gram panchayats, 80 inhabited villages and 3 census towns (Meru, Maraikalan and Okni II).Hazaribag Muffasil police station serves this CD block. Headquarters of this CD block is at Hazaribag.

== Demographics ==
=== Population ===
According to the 2011 Census of India, Hazaribagh CD block had a total population of 147,609, of which 118,276 were rural and 29,333 were urban. There were 78,119 (53%) males and 69,490 (47%) females. Population in the age range 0–6 years was 20,790. Scheduled Castes numbered 26,866 (18.20%) and Scheduled Tribes numbered 6,485(4.39%).

Census towns in Hazaribagh CD block are (2011 census figures in brackets): Meru (7,780), Marai Kalan (10,447) and Okni II (11,106).

Large villages (with 4,000+ population) in Hazaribagh CD block are (2011 census figures in brackets): Harhad (4,093), Kolghatti (4,317), Oreya (4,925), Lakh (4,412) and Mandari Khurd (5,470).

Other villages in Hazaribagh CD block include (2011 census figures in brackets): Rola (1,818), Chano (133), Silwar Kalam (3,263), Silwar Khurd (2,730), Singhani (2,595) and Seotagarha (591).

=== Literacy ===
As of 2011 census, the total number of literate persons in Hazaribagh CD block was 98,355 (77.56% of the population over 6 years) out of which males numbered 57,821 (85.90% of the male population over 6 years) and females numbered 40,534 (68.12% of the female population over 6 years). The gender disparity (the difference between female and male literacy rates) was 17.78%.

As of 2011 census, literacy in Hazaribagh district was 70.48%. Literacy in Jharkhand was 67.63% in 2011. Literacy in India in 2011 was 74.04%.

See also – List of Jharkhand districts ranked by literacy rate

Literacy in CD Blocks of
Hazaribagh district
Barhi subdivision
Chauparan – 69.41%
Barhi – 68.39%
Padma – 68.90%
Barkatha – 61.44%
Chalkusha – 67.13%
Hazaribagh Sadar subdivision
Ichak – 71.87%
Tati Jhariya – 60.68%
Daru – 71.08%
Bishnugarh – 62.04%
Sadar, Hazaribagh – 77.56%
Katkamsandi – 67.38%
Katkamdag – 69.97%
Keredari – 64.04%
Barkagaon – 65.44%
Churchu – 67.97%
Dadi – 70.26%
Source: 2011 Census: CD Block Wise
Primary Census Abstract Data

=== Language and religion ===
Religions in Hazaribagh Sadar CD block (2011)
Religion	Percent
Hinduism	74.26%
Islam	21.32%
Christianity	2.67%
Sarna	0.85%
Jainism	0.54%
Other or not stated	0.36%

In 2011, 215,414 (74.26%) of the population was Hindu, 61,852 (21.32%) Muslim, 7,759 (2.67%) Christian and 1,558 (0.54%) Jain. Other religions were 3,515 (1.21%).

Languages of Hazaribagh Sadar CD block (2011)
1. Hindi (45.3%)
2. Khortha (34.9%)
3. Urdu (14.6%)
4. Bengali (5.19%)

At the time of the 2011 census, 45.32% of the population spoke Hindi, 34.85% Khortha, 14.64% Urdu, and 5.19% Bengali as their first language.

== Rural poverty ==
40-50% of the population of Hazaribagh district were in the BPL category in 2004–2005, being in the same category as Godda, Giridih and Koderma districts. Rural poverty in Jharkhand declined from 66% in 1993–94 to 46% in 2004–05. In 2011, it has come down to 39.1%.

== Economy ==
=== Livelihood ===
Livelihood
in Sadar, Hazaribagh CD block
1. Cultivators (9.02%)
2. Agricultural labourers (7.43%)
3. Household industries (2.38%)
4. Other Workers (81.2%)

In Sadar, Hazaribagh CD block in 2011, amongst the class of total workers, cultivators numbered 7,513 and formed 9.02%, agricultural labourers numbered 6,182 and formed 7.43%, household industry workers numbered 1,984 and formed 2.38% and other workers numbered 67,574 and formed 81.17%. Total workers numbered 83,253 and formed 28.70% of the total population, and non-workers numbered 206,845 and formed 71.30% of the population.

Note: In the census records, a person is considered a cultivator, if the person is engaged in cultivation/ supervision of land owned. When a person who works on another person's land for wages in cash or kind or share, is regarded as an agricultural labourer. Household industry is defined as an industry conducted by one or more members of the family within the household or village, and one that does not qualify for registration as a factory under the Factories Act. Other workers are persons engaged in some economic activity other than cultivators, agricultural labourers and household workers. It includes factory, mining, plantation, transport and office workers, those engaged in business and commerce, teachers, entertainment artistes and on.

=== Infrastructure ===
There are 80 inhabited villages in Sadar, Hazaribagh CD block. In 2011, 76 villages had power supply. 7 villages had tap water (treated/ untreated), 80 villages had well water (covered/ uncovered), 78 villages had hand pumps, and all villages had drinking water facility. 13 villages had post offices, 11 villages had sub post offices, 28 villages had telephones (land lines) and 36 villages had mobile phone coverage. 79 villages had pucca (hard top) village roads, 18 villages had bus service (public/ private), 31 villages had autos/ modified autos, and 49 villages had tractors. 3 villages had bank branches, 9 villages had agricultural credit societies, no village had cinema/ video hall, 2 villages had public library and public reading rooms. 43 villages had public distribution system, 6 villages had weekly haat (market) and 40 villages had assembly polling stations.

=== Forestry and agriculture ===
The main occupation of the people of Hazaribagh district is cultivation. While forests occupy around 45% of the total area, the cultivable area forms about 39% of the total area. The forests are uniformly spread across the district. Sal is the predominant species in the jungles. Other species are: bamboo, khair, sali, semal, mahua, tamarind, mango, black-berry (jamun), peepal, karnaj, jack-fruit, margosa (neem), kusum, palas, kend, asan, piar and bhelwa. Hazaribag Wildlife Sanctuary is located around 19 km north of Hazaribag. Irrigation facilities in this hilly area are inadequate and generally farmers depend on rain for their cultivation. The land situated along the river banks, or low land, is fertile but the uplands are generally barren. May to October is Kharif season, followed by Rabi season. Rice is the main crop of the district. Other important crops grown are: bazra, maize, pulses (mainly arhar and gram) and oilseeds. Limited quantities of cash crops, such as sugar cane, are grown.

=== Backward Regions Grant Fund ===
Hazaribagh district is listed as a backward region and receives financial support from the Backward Regions Grant Fund. The fund, created by the Government of India, is designed to redress regional imbalances in development. As of 2012, 272 districts across the country were listed under this scheme. The list includes 21 districts of Jharkhand.

== Transport ==
National Highway 20 passes through this block. State Highway 7 (Jharkhand) running from Hazaribagh to Hutar (in Palamu district), Hazaribagh-Hazaribagh Road station (Suriya) road, Hazaribagh-Katkamsandi Road and other roads emanating from Hazaribagh pss through this block.

The 79.7 km long first stage railway project from Koderma to Hazaribagh costing ₹ 936 crore was inaugurated by Prime Minister Narendra Modi on 20 February 2015. The 57 km long Hazaribagh-Barkakana section was opened for passenger trains on 7 December 2016 by the railway minister Suresh Prabhu in the presence of chief minister Raghubar Das. The Koderma-Hazaribagh-Barkakana-Ranchi line passes through Sadar, Hazaribagh CD block and there is a station at Hazaribagh.

== Education ==
In 2011, amongst the 80 inhabited villages in Sadar, Hazaribagh CD Block, 11 villages had no primary school, 30 villages had one primary school and 30 villages had more than one primary school. 45 villages had at least one primary school and one middle school. 20 villages had at least one middle school and one secondary school. There is a medical college in this CD block.

== Healthcare ==
In 2011, amongst the 80 inhabited villages in Sadar, Hazaribagh CD block, 1 village had community health centre, 1 villages had primary health centres, 11 villages had primary health sub-centres, 1 village had maternity and child welfare centre, 1 village had allopathic hospital, 1 village had alternative medicine hospital, 1 village had a dispensary, 3 villages had medicine shops and 60 villages had no medical facilities.
