= Katkamdag (community development block) =

- Community development block
- Location in Jharkhand Katkamdag (India)
- Coordinates: 23°58′53″N 85°17′29″E
- Country: India
- State: Jharkhand
- District: Hazaribagh

Government
  - Type: Federal democracy

Area
  - Total: 163.03 km^{2} (62.95 sq mi)

Population (2011)
  - Total: 82,385
  - Density: 505.34/km^{2} (1,308.8/sq mi)

Languages
  - Official: Hindi, Urdu
- Time zone: UTC+5:30 (IST)
- PIN: 825302 (College More)
- Telephone/ STD code: 06546
- Vehicle registration: JH 02
- Lok Sabha constituency: Hazaribagh
- Vidhan Sabha constituency: Hazaribagh
- Website: hazaribag.nic.in

Katkamdag is a community development block (CD block) that forms an administrative division in the Hazaribagh Sadar subdivision of the Hazaribagh district in the Indian state of Jharkhand.

== Overview ==
Hazaribagh district is spread over a part of the Chota Nagpur Plateau. The central plateau, averaging a height of 2,000 ft (610 m), occupies the central part of the district. On all sides, except on the western side, it is surrounded by the lower plateau, averaging a height of 1,300 ft (396 m), the surface being undulating. In the north and the north-west the lower plateau forms a fairly level tableland till the ghats, when the height drops to about 700 ft (213 m) and slopes down gradually. The Damodar and the Barakar form the two main watersheds in the district. DVC has constructed the Konar Dam across the Konar River. It is a forested district with cultivation as the main occupation of the people. Coal is the main mineral found in this district. China clay is also found in this district. Inaugurating the Pradhan Mantri Ujjwala Yojana in 2016, Raghubar Das, Chief Minister of Jharkhand, had indicated that there were 23 lakh BPL families in Jharkhand. There was a plan to bring the BPL proportion in the total population down to 35%.

== Maoist activities ==
Right from its inception in 2000. Jharkhand was a “laboratory” for Naxalites to experiment with their ideas of establishing a parallel government. As of 2005, 16 of the 22 districts in the state, including Hazaribagh district, was transformed into a “guerrilla zone”. The movement was not restricted to armed operations but included kangaroo courts called Jan adalats, elected village bodies and people's police. Jharkhand, with a dense forest cover over a large part of the state, offers a favourable terrain for the Naxalites to build their bases and operate. Annual fatalities in Jharkhand were 117 in 2003 and 150 in 2004. In 2013 Jharkhand was considered one of the two states in the country most affected by Left wing extremism and Jharkhand police set up an exclusive cell to deal with Maoist activities. However, in the same year, when Jharkhand police identified 13 focus areas for combating Maoist extremism, Hazaribagh district was not one of them.

== Geography ==
Katkamdag is located at 23°58′53″N 85°17′29″E.

Katkamdag CD block is bounded by Katkamsandi CD block on the north, Sadar, Hazaribagh CD block on the east, Barkagaon CD block on the south and Simaria CD block, in Chatra district, on the west.

Katkamdag CD block has an area of 163.03 km^{2}. As of 2011, Katkamdag CD block had 13 gram panchayats, 46 inhabited villages and 2 census towns (Masratu, Kadma No. II).Katkamsandi police station serves this CD block, Headquarters of this CD block is at Katkamdag.

Gonda Dam, an irrigation project, is located near Salgaon. The dam, constructed across the Gonda River, was completed in 1954. It is 1006.09 m long and 13.41 m high.

== Demographics ==
=== Population ===
According to the 2011 Census of India, Katkamdag CD block (referred to in census data as Katamdag) had a total population of 82,385, of which 69,150 were rural and 13,235 were urban. There were 42,581 (52%) males and 39,804 (48%) females. Population in the age range 0-6 years was 13,446. Scheduled Castes numbered 17,309 (21.01%) and Scheduled Tribes numbered 2,604 (4.16%).

Census towns in Katkamdag CD block are (2011 census figures in brackets): Masratu (5,996) and Kadma No. II (7,239).

Large villages (with 4,000+ population) in Katkamdag CD block are (2011 census figures in brackets): Sultana (4,083), Dhengura (4,660), Nawada (5,456) and Khapriaon (4,926).

Other villages in Katkamdag CD block include (2011 census figures in brackets): Katkamdag (2,334) and Salgaon (3,491).

=== Literacy ===
As of 2011 census, the total number of literate persons in Katkamdag CD block was 48,234 (69.97% of the population over 6 years) out of which males numbered 28,116 (78.72% of the male population over 6 years) and females numbered 20,118 (55.47% of the female population over 6 years). The gender disparity (the difference between female and male literacy rates) was 19.44%.

As of 2011 census, literacy in Hazaribagh district was 70.48%. Literacy in Jharkhand was 67.63% in 2011. Literacy in India in 2011 was 74.04%.

See also – List of Jharkhand districts ranked by literacy rate

Literacy in CD Blocks of
Hazaribagh district
Barhi subdivision
Chauparan – 69.41%
Barhi – 68.39%
Padma – 68.90%
Barkatha – 61.44%
Chalkusha – 67.13%
Hazaribagh Sadar subdivision
Ichak – 71.87%
Tati Jhariya – 60.68%
Daru – 71.08%
Bishnugarh – 62.04%
Sadar, Hazaribagh – 77.56%
Katkamsandi – 67.38%
Katkamdag – 69.97%
Keredari – 64.04%
Barkagaon – 65.44%
Churchu – 67.97%
Dadi – 70.26%
Source: 2011 Census: CD Block Wise
Primary Census Abstract Data

=== Language and language ===
Religions in Katkamdag CD block (2011)
Religion	Percent
Hinduism	73.54%
Islam	23.91%
Christianity	1.16%
Sarna	1.13%
Other or not stated	0.26%

In 2011, 60,589 (73.54%) of the population was Hindu, 19,700 (23.91%) Muslim, 959 (1.16%) Christian. Other religions were 1,137 (1.38%).

Languages of Katkamdag CD block (2011)
1. Khortha (59.3%)
2. Hindi (26.7%)
3. Urdu (11.6%)
4. Others (2.39%)

At the time of the 2011 census, 59.32% of the population spoke Khortha, 26.71% Hindi and 11.58% Urdu as their first language.

== Rural poverty ==
40-50% of the population of Hazaribagh district were in the BPL category in 2004–2005, being in the same category as Godda, Giridih and Koderma districts. Rural poverty in Jharkhand declined from 66% in 1993–94 to 46% in 2004–05. In 2011, it has come down to 39.1%.

== Economy ==
=== Livelihood ===
Livelihood
in Katkamdag CD block
1. Cultivators (24.7%)
2. Agricultural labourers (20.6%)
3. Household industries (2.15%)
4. Other Workers (52.5%)

In Katkamdag CD block in 2011, amongst the class of total workers, cultivators numbered 6,992 and formed 24.67%, agricultural labourers numbered 5,849 and formed 20.63%, household industry workers numbered 609 and formed 2.15% and other workers numbered 14,897 and formed 52.55%. Total workers numbered 28,437 and formed 34.52% of the total population, and non-workers numbered 54,038 and formed 65.59% of the population.

Note: In the census records, a person is considered a cultivator, if the person is engaged in cultivation/ supervision of land owned. When a person who works on another person's land for wages in cash or kind or share, is regarded as an agricultural labourer. Household industry is defined as an industry conducted by one or more members of the family within the household or village, and one that does not qualify for registration as a factory under the Factories Act. Other workers are persons engaged in some economic activity other than cultivators, agricultural labourers and household workers. It includes factory, mining, plantation, transport and office workers, those engaged in business and commerce, teachers, entertainment artistes and so on.

=== Infrastructure ===
There are 46 inhabited villages in Katkamdag CD block. In 2011, 28 villages had power supply. No village had tap water (treated/ untreated), 45 villages had well water (covered/ uncovered), 45 villages had hand pumps, and all villages had drinking water facility. 6 villages had post offices, 6 villages had sub post offices, no village had telephones (land lines) and 19 villages had mobile phone coverage. 45 villages had pucca (hard top) village roads, 18 villages had bus service (public/ private), 11 villages had autos/ modified autos, and 15 villages had tractors. 1 village had a bank branch, 3 villages had agricultural credit societies, no village had cinema/ video hall, no villages had public library and public reading room. 21 villages had public distribution system, 4 villages had weekly haat (market) and 17 villages had assembly polling stations.

=== Forestry and agriculture ===
The main occupation of the people of Hazaribagh district is cultivation. While forests occupy around 45% of the total area, the cultivable area forms about 39% of the total area. The forests are uniformly spread across the district. Sal is the predominant species in the jungles. Other species are: bamboo, khair, sali, semal, mahua, tamarind, mango, blackberry (jamun), peepal, karnaj, jack-fruit, margosa (neem), kusum, palas, kend, asan, piar and bhelwa. Hazaribag Wildlife Sanctuary is located around 19 km north of Hazaribag. Irrigation facilities in this hilly area are inadequate and generally farmers depend on rain for their cultivation. The land situated along the river banks, or low land, is fertile but the uplands are generally barren. May to October is Kharif season, followed by Rabi season. Rice is the main crop of the district. Other important crops grown are: bazra, maize, pulses (mainly arhar and gram) and oilseeds. Limited quantities of cash crops, such as sugar cane, are grown.

=== Backward Regions Grant Fund ===
Hazaribagh district is listed as a backward region and receives financial support from the Backward Regions Grant Fund. The fund, created by the Government of India, is designed to redress regional imbalances in development. As of 2012, 272 districts across the country were listed under this scheme. The list includes 21 districts of Jharkhand.

== Transport ==
Hazaribagh-Simariya Road links Katkamdag to Hazaribagh, the district headquarters.

The Koderma-Hazaribagh-Barkakana-Ranchi line passes through this block and there is a station at Bes.

== Education ==
In 2011, amongst the 46 inhabited villages in Katkamdag CD block, 3 villages had no primary school, 27 villages had one primary school and 25 villages had more than one primary school. 23 villages had at least one primary school and one middle school. 12 villages had at least one middle school and one secondary school.

== Culture ==
Narsingsthan is a popular religious site in Khapriaon village on Hazaribagh-Barkagaon Road. It is 6 km from Hazaribagh. There is an idol of Lord Narsing, an avatar of the Hindu god Vishnu, and a Shiva lingam in the main temple. There also are other temples dedicated to Dashavatara, Suryadev, Maa Kali and Hanumanji. About 200 devotees visit the place daily and many religious ceremonies are held throughout the year. A big fair is held on the occasion of Kartik Purnima (November–December).

== Healthcare ==
In 2011, amongst the 46 inhabited villages in Katkamdag CD block, 1 village had primary health centre, 4 villages had primary health sub-centres, 1 village had allopathic hospital, 1 village had a dispensary, 1 village had a medicine shop and 34 villages had no medical facilities.
