= Masratu =

- Census Town
- Location in Jharkhand, India Masratu (India)
- Coordinates: 23.981389°N 85.32389°E
- Country: India
- State: Jharkhand
- District: Hazaribagh

Government
  - Type: Federal democracy

Area
  - Total: 3.75 km^{2} (1.45 sq mi)

Population (2011)
  - Total: 5,996
  - Density: 1,600/km^{2} (4,140/sq mi)

Languages (*For language details see Katkamdag (community development block)#Language and religion)
  - Official: Hindi, Urdu
- Time zone: UTC+5:30 (IST)
- PIN: 825302
- Telephone/ STD code: 06546
- Vehicle registration: JH 02
- Lok Sabha constituency: Hazaribagh
- Vidhan Sabha constituency: Hazaribagh
- Website: hazaribag.nic.in

Masratu is a census town in the Katkamdag CD block in the Hazaribagh Sadar subdivision of the Hazaribagh district in the Indian state of Jharkhand.

== Geography ==
Hazaribagh City
CT: census town, R: rural/ urban centre, T: tourist centre, C: educational centre, F: facility
Owing to space constraints in the small map, the actual locations in a larger map may vary slightly

=== Location ===
Masratu is located at 23.981389°N 85.326389°E.

== Demographics ==
According to the 2011 Census of India, Masratu (location code 368709) had a total population of 5,996, of which 3,161 (53%) were males and 2,835 (47%) were females. Population in the age range 0–6 years was 904. The total number of literate persons in Masratu was 3,806 (74.74% of the population over 6 years).

== Infrastructure ==
According to the District Census Handbook 2011, Hazaribagh, Masratu covered an area of 3.75 km^{2}. Among the civic amenities, it had 7 km roads with open drains, the protected water supply involved uncovered well, hand pump. It had 685 domestic electric connections. Among the educational facilities it had 6 primary schools, 3 middle schools, other educational facilities at Hazaribagh 6 km away. Among the social, recreational and cultural facilities, it had 3 stadiums, 1 public library, reading room. An important commodity it manufactured was chhana. It had office of 1 cooperative bank.

== Transport ==
Hazaribagh Town railway station on the Koderma–Hazaribagh–Barkakana–Ranchi line is located nearby.
