= Pelawal =

Pelawal Palawa
- Census Town
- Location in Jharkhand, India Pelawal (India)
- Coordinates: 24.0244°N 85.3365°E
- Country: India
- State: Jharkhand
- District: Hazaribagh

Population (2011)
  - Total: 14,848

Languages (*For language details see Katkamsandi (community development block)#Language and religion)
  - Official: Hindi, Urdu
- Time zone: UTC+5:30 (IST)
- PIN: 825319 (Reformatory School)
- Telephone/ STD code: 06546
- Vehicle registration: JH 02
- Website: hazaribag.nic.in

Pelawal (also known as Palawa) is a census town in the Katkamsandi CD block in the Hazaribagh Sadar subdivision of the Hazaribagh district in the Indian state of Jharkhand.

== Geography ==
Hazaribagh City
CT: census town, R: rural/ urban centre, T: tourist centre, C: educational centre, F: facility
Owing to space constraints in the small map, the actual locations in a larger map may vary slightly

=== Location ===
According to Google maps, Pelawal is located at 24.0244°N 85.3365°E. Palawa is not shown in Google maps. As per the map of Katkamsandi CD Block on page 116 of District Census Handbook Hazaribagh 2011, the location of Pelawa is same as that of Pelawal in Google maps.

== Civic administration ==
=== Police out-post ===
Pelawal police out-post serves the Katkamsandi CD block.

== Demographics ==
According to the 2011 Census of India, Palawa had a total population of 14,848, of which 7,701 (52%) were males and 7,147 (48%) were females. Population in the age range 0–6 years was 2,450. The total number of literate persons in Palawa was 9,503 (76.65% of the population over 6 years).

As of 2001 India census, Palawa had a population of 9,757. Males constitute 53% of the population and females 47%. Palawa has an average literacy rate of 60%, higher than the national average of 59.5%. Male literacy is 66%, and female literacy is 53%. In Palawa, 19% of the population is under 6 years of age.

== Infrastructure ==
According to the District Census Handbook 2011, Hazaribagh, Palawa covered an area of 1.61 km^{2}. Among the civic amenities, it had 5 km roads with open drains, the protected water supply involved uncovered well, hand pump. It had 2,025 domestic electric connections, 40 road lighting points. Among the educational facilities it had 7 primary schools, 6 middle schools, 1 secondary school, other educational facilities at Hazaribagh 5 km away. An important commodity it manufactured was bidi. It had offices of 1 nationalised bank, 1 agricultural credit society, 1 non-agricultural credit society.

== Transport ==
Pelawal is on the Hazaribagh-Katkamsandi Road, located between Hazaribagh and Chharwa Dam.
