= Piparwar, Chatra =

Piparwar
- Village
- Location in Jharkhand, India Piparwar (India)
- Coordinates: 23.6911°N 85.0668°E
- Country: India
- State: Jharkhand
- District: Chatra

Languages (*For language details see Tandwa block#Language and religion)
  - Official: Hindi, Urdu
- Time zone: UTC+5:30 (IST)
- PIN: 825321
- Telephone/ STD code: 06551
- Vehicle registration: JH 13
- Lok Sabha constituency: Chatra
- Vidhan Sabha constituency: Simaria
- Website: chatra.nic.in

Piparwar is a village in the Tandwa CD block in the Simaria subdivision of the Chatra district in the Indian state of Jharkhand.

== Geography ==
Cities, towns and locations in Chatra district in North Chotanagpur Division
M: municipality, CT: census town, R: rural/ urban centre, H: historical/ religious centre, P: power plant, T: tourist centre
Abbreviation used - TPS: thermal power station
Owing to space constraints in the small map, the actual locations in a larger map may vary slightly

=== Location ===
Piparwar is located at 23.6911°N 85.0668°E.

=== Area overview ===
The map alongside shows that the forests (mark the light shading), covering around 60% of Chatra district, are evenly spread across the district. It is a plateau area with an elevation of about 450 metres (1,476 ft) above mean sea level. Efforts are on to get the first unit of the NTPC Limited’s North Karanpura Thermal Power Station (3x660 MW), ready in 2021.North Karanpura Coalfield of Central Coalfields Limited, spread over 1,230 square kilometres (470 sq mi) in the southern part of the district, with spill over to neighbouring districts, and having coal reserves of 14 billion tonnes is among the biggest in India. The map provides links to three CCL operational areas.

Note: The map alongside presents some of the notable locations in the district. All places marked in the map are linked in the larger full screen map.

== Civic administration ==
=== Police station ===
Piparwar police station serves Tandwa CD block.

== Economy ==
=== Coal mining ===
The North Karanpura Coalfield is spread across parts of Ranchi, Hazaribagh, Chatra and Latehar districts of Jharkhand covering an area of 1,230 km^{2}. This coalfield in the upper reaches of the Damodar Valley, has reserves of around 14 billion tonnes of coal, very little of which has been exploited. Karkatta, KD Hesalong, Manki, Churi, Bachara UG, Bachara OC, and Dakara are long established collieries south of the Damodar. North of the Damodar lies comparatively new major mines such as Piparwar Mine and Ashoka Project. 23 mines are planned in the northern sector. Those in an advanced stage of planning are: Dhadu, Purnadih, Magadh, and Amrapali. This happens to be the largest mining sector of Central Coalfields Limited.

The projects of the Piparwar Area are: Piparwar opencast, Ray-Bachra underground, Ashoka opencast, Piparwar coal handling plant/ coal preparation plant. The Area office is at Piparwar, PO Bachra.
