= Katkamsandi (community development block) =

- Community development block
- Location in Jharkhand Katkamsandi (India)
- Coordinates: 24°6′27″N 85°12′24″E
- Country: India
- State: Jharkhand
- District: Hazaribagh

Government
  - Type: Federal democracy

Area
  - Total: 300.52 km^{2} (116.03 sq mi)

Population (2011)
  - Total: 108,361
  - Density: 360.58/km^{2} (933.89/sq mi)

Languages
  - Official: Hindi, Urdu
- Time zone: UTC+5:30 (IST)
- PIN: 825319 (Katkamsandi)
- Telephone/ STD code: 06546
- Vehicle registration: JH 02
- Lok Sabha constituency: Hazaribagh
- Vidhan Sabha constituency: Hazaribagh
- Website: hazaribag.nic.in

Katkamsandi is a community development block (CD block) that forms an administrative division in the Hazaribagh Sadar subdivision of Hazaribagh district in the Indian state of Jharkhand.

== Overview ==
Hazaribagh district is spread over a part of the Chota Nagpur Plateau. The central plateau, averaging a height of 2,000 ft (610 m), occupies the central part of the district. On all sides, except on the western side, it is surrounded by the lower plateau, averaging a height of 1,300 ft (396 m), the surface being undulating. In the north and the north-west the lower plateau forms a fairly level tableland till the ghats, when the height drops to about 700 ft (213 m) and slopes down gradually. The Damodar and the Barakar form the two main watersheds in the district. DVC has constructed the Konar Dam across the Konar River. It is a forested district with cultivation as the main occupation of the people. Coal is the main mineral found in this district. China clay is also found in this district. Inaugurating the Pradhan Mantri Ujjwala Yojana in 2016, Raghubar Das, Chief Minister of Jharkhand, had indicated that there were 23 lakh BPL families in Jharkhand. There was a plan to bring the BPL proportion in the total population down to 35%.

== Maoist activities ==
Right from its inception in 2000. Jharkhand was a “laboratory” for Naxalites to experiment with their ideas of establishing a parallel government. As of 2005, 16 of the 22 districts in the state, including Hazaribagh district, was transformed into a “guerrilla zone”. The movement was not restricted to armed operations but included kangaroo courts called Jan adalats, elected village bodies and people's police. Jharkhand, with a dense forest cover over a large part of the state, offers a favourable terrain for the Naxalites to build their bases and operate. Annual fatalities in Jharkhand were 117 in 2003 and 150 in 2004. In 2013 Jharkhand was considered one of the two states in the country most affected by Left wing extremism and Jharkhand police set up an exclusive cell to deal with Maoist activities. However, in the same year, when Jharkhand police identified 13 focus areas for combating Maoist extremism, Hazaribagh district was not one of them.

== Geography ==
Katkamsandi is located at 24°6′27″N 85°12′24″E.

Katkamsandi CD block is bounded by Itkhori and Mayurhand CD blocks, in Chatra district, on the north, Padma, Ichak and Sadar, Hazaribagh CD blocks on the east, Katkamdag CD block on the south and Gidhour and Pathalgada CD blocks, in Chatra district, on the west.

Katkamsandi CD block has an area of 300.52 km^{2}. As of 2011, Katkamsandi CD block had 18 gram panchayats, 77 inhabited villages and 1 census town (Palawa).Katkamsandi police station and Pelawal police out-post serve this CD block. Headquarters of this CD block is at Katkamsandi.

Chharwa Dam, constructed in 1954, is the life line of the Hazaribagh town water supply system. Even with “mammoth” efforts to rejuvenate Chharwa and other water supply reservoirs in Jharkhand, in the parched-dry Hazaribagh summer it often reaches the dying stage, only to be revived by the onset of the monsoons.

== Demographics ==
=== Population ===
According to the 2011 Census of India, Katkamsandi CD block had a total population of 108,361, of which 93,513 were rural and 14,848 were urban. There were 55,413 (51%) males and 52,948 (49%) females. Population in the age range 0-6 years was 18,751. Scheduled Castes numbered 22,699 (20.95%) and Scheduled Tribes numbered 7,141 (6.59%).

Census town in Katkamsandi CD block is (2011 census figures in brackets): Pelawal (14,848).

Large villages (with 4,000+ population) in Katkamsandi CD block are (2011 census figures in brackets): Shahpur (4,180), Katkamsandi (5,132), Danr (4,398), Lupung (5,533) and Pabra (4,374).

Other villages in Katkamsandi CD block include (2011 census figures in brackets): Chharwa (843)

=== Literacy ===
As of 2011 census, the total number of literate persons in Katkamsandi CD block was 60,375 (67.88% of the population over 6 years) out of which males numbered 35,347 (77.07% of the male population over 6 years) and females numbered 25,028 (57.21% of the female population over 6 years). The gender disparity (the difference between female and male literacy rates) was 19.86%.

As of 2011 census, literacy in Hazaribagh district was 70.48%. Literacy in Jharkhand was 67.63% in 2011. Literacy in India in 2011 was 74.04%.

See also – List of Jharkhand districts ranked by literacy rate

Literacy in CD Blocks of
Hazaribagh district
Barhi subdivision
Chauparan – 69.41%
Barhi – 68.39%
Padma – 68.90%
Barkatha – 61.44%
Chalkusha – 67.13%
Hazaribagh Sadar subdivision
Ichak – 71.87%
Tati Jhariya – 60.68%
Daru – 71.08%
Bishnugarh – 62.04%
Sadar, Hazaribagh – 77.56%
Katkamsandi – 67.38%
Katkamdag – 69.97%
Keredari – 64.04%
Barkagaon – 65.44%
Churchu – 67.97%
Dadi – 70.26%
Source: 2011 Census: CD Block Wise
Primary Census Abstract Data

=== Language and religion ===
Religions in Katkamsandi CD block (2011)
Religion	Percent
Hinduism	67.46%
Islam	28.48%
Sarna	2.35%
Christianity	1.59%
Other or not stated	0.12%

In 2011, 73,101 (67.46%) of the population was Hindu, 30,860 (28.48%) Muslim, 1,720 (1.59%) Christian. Other religions were 2,680 (2.47%).

Languages of Katkamsandi CD block (2011)
1. Khortha (49.2%)
2. Hindi (27.3%)
3. Urdu (18.4%)
4. Mundari (2.83%)
5. Sadri (1.63%)
6. Others (0.65%)

At the time of the 2011 census, 49.20% of the population spoke Khortha, 27.30% Hindi, 18.39% Urdu, 2.83% Mundari and 1.63% Sadri as their first language.

== Rural poverty ==
40-50% of the population of Hazaribagh district were in the BPL category in 2004–2005, being in the same category as Godda, Giridih and Koderma districts. Rural poverty in Jharkhand declined from 66% in 1993–94 to 46% in 2004–05. In 2011, it has come down to 39.1%.

== Economy ==
=== Livelihood ===
Livelihood
in Katkamsandi CD block
1. Cultivators (27.8%)
2. Agricultural labourers (28.3%)
3. Household industries (2.21%)
4. Other Workers (41.7%)

In Katkamsandi CD block in 2011, amongst the class of total workers, cultivators numbered 10,582 and formed 27.78%, agricultural labourers numbered 10,794 and formed 28.33%, household industry workers numbered 842 and formed 2.21% and other workers numbered 15,880 and formed 41.68%. Total workers numbered 38,098 and formed 35.16% of the total population, and non-workers numbered 70,263 and formed 68.84% of the population.

Note: In the census records, a person is considered a cultivator, if the person is engaged in cultivation/ supervision of land owned. When a person who works on another person's land for wages in cash or kind or share, is regarded as an agricultural labourer. Household industry is defined as an industry conducted by one or more members of the family within the household or village, and one that does not qualify for registration as a factory under the Factories Act. Other workers are persons engaged in some economic activity other than cultivators, agricultural labourers and household workers. It includes factory, mining, plantation, transport and office workers, those engaged in business and commerce, teachers, entertainment artistes and so on.

=== Infrastructure ===
There are 77 inhabited villages in Katkamsandi CD Block. In 2011, 65 villages had power supply. 4 villages had tap water (treated/ untreated), 77 villages had well water (covered/ uncovered), 77 villages had hand pumps, and all villages had drinking water facility. 9 villages had post offices, 4 villages had sub post offices, 8 villages had telephones (land lines) and 31 villages had mobile phone coverage. 77 villages had pucca (hard top) village roads, 8 villages had bus service (public/ private), 5 villages had autos/ modified autos, and 30 villages had tractors. 3 villages had bank branches, 7 villages had agricultural credit societies, no village had cinema/ video hall, no village had public library and public reading room. 32 villages had public distribution system, 14 villages had weekly haat (market) and 38 villages had assembly polling stations.

=== Forestry and agriculture ===
The main occupation of the people of Hazaribagh district is cultivation. While forests occupy around 45% of the total area, the cultivable area forms about 39% of the total area. The forests are uniformly spread across the district. Sal is the predominant species in the jungles. Other species are: bamboo, khair, sali, semal, mahua, tamarind, mango, black-berry (jamun), peepal, karnaj, jack-fruit, margosa (neem), kusum, palas, kend, asan, piar and bhelwa. Hazaribag Wildlife Sanctuary is located around 19 km north of Hazaribag. Irrigation facilities in this hilly area are inadequate and generally farmers depend on rain for their cultivation. The land situated along the river banks, or low land, is fertile but the uplands are generally barren. May to October is Kharif season, followed by Rabi season. Rice is the main crop of the district. Other important crops grown are: bazra, maize, pulses (mainly arhar and gram) and oilseeds. Limited quantities of cash crops, such as sugar cane, are grown.

=== Backward Regions Grant Fund ===
Hazaribagh district is listed as a backward region and receives financial support from the Backward Regions Grant Fund. The fund, created by the Government of India, is designed to redress regional imbalances in development. As of 2012, 272 districts across the country were listed under this scheme. The list includes 21 districts of Jharkhand.

== Transport ==
Hazaribagh-Katkamsandi road links Katkamsandi to Hazaribagh, the district headquarters.

The 79.7 km long first stage railway project from Koderma to Hazaribagh costing ₹ 936 crore was inaugurated by Prime Minister Narendra Modi on 20 February 2015. The Koderma-Hazaribagh-Barkakana-Ranchi line passes through this block and there is a station at Katkamsandi.

== Education ==
In 2011, amongst the 77 inhabited villages in Katkamsandi CD block, 8 villages had no primary school, 56 villages had one primary school and 13 villages had more than one primary school. 38 villages had at least one primary school and one middle school. 7 villages had at least one middle school and one secondary school.

== Healthcare ==
In 2011, amongst the 77 inhabited villages in Katkamsandi CD block, 1 village had community health centre, 8 villages had primary health sub-centres, 2 villages had maternity and child welfare centres, 1 village had allopathic hospital, 1 village had alternative medicine hospital, 1 village had a dispensary, 3 villages had medicine shops and 62 villages had no medical facilities.
