= Lawalong Wildlife Sanctuary =

Nature reserve in Jharkhand, India

- IUCN category IV (habitat/species management area)
- Location within Jharkhand Location within India
- Interactive map of Lawalong Wildlife Sanctuary
- Location: Chatra district, Jharkhand, India
- Coordinates: 24°10′05″N 84°41′12″E
- Area: 207 square kilometres (80 sq mi)
- Established: 1978 (officially notified as a wildlife sanctuary)

Lawalong Wildlife Sanctuary is located in the Lawalong CD block in the Chatra subdivision of the Chatra district in the state of Jharkhand, India.

== History ==
Lawalong Wildlife Sanctuary was earlier under the control of the Raja of Ramgarh and other landlords in the area. The government took charge in 1924 and in 1947 it became a private protected forest. The ownership vested with the Government of Bihar in 1953. In earlier days, the presence of wildlife in high numbers in these forests attracted hunters from all over the country. One of the owners of this area, the Tikait of Kunda Estate used to organise “shikar” from time to time, in a big way. Subsequently, hunting was completely banned under the Wildlife Protection Act 1972. There are 64 villages in the sanctuary area and the people of these villages have certain rights and privileges, as for example grazing cattle and collecting firewood.

== Geography ==
Cities, towns and locations in Chatra district in North Chotanagpur Division
M: municipality, CT: census town, R: rural/ urban centre, H: historical/ religious centre, P: power plant, T: tourist centre, WLS: Wildlife Sanctuary, TR: Tiger Reserve,
Abbreviation used - TPS: thermal power station

=== Location ===
Lawalong Wildlife Sanctuary is located around 24.160652°N 84.657478°E. It is spread over an area of 207 square kilometres (80 sq mi). The sanctuary is surrounded by the Amanat River in the south, the Chako River in the west and the Lilajan River in the north-east.

Lawalong Wildlife Sanctuary is about 35 km from Chatra. The Gaya-Ranchi state highway passes near the Lawalong sanctuary on its eastern side. There is a road connecting the Gaya-Ranchi state highway and leads to Lawalong village and passes through the sanctuary area. The Hazaribagh-Simaria-Bagra Mor P.W.D. Road leads to Lawalong, where the Beat office of Lawalong Beat of Wild Life Sanctuary is situated. The buses for Lawalong and Kunda ply on these roads and halts at important places like Lutidih, Bagra Mor etc. The nearest large railway station is at Daltonganj, 50 km away.

Note: The map alongside presents some of the notable locations in the district. All places marked in the map are linked in the larger full screen map.

== Forests ==
The forests in the sanctuary are classified as Northern Tropical Dry Deciduous Forests. The forests are miscellaneous in nature and the canopy is moderately close with trees attaining good height and diameter growth. The ‘sal’ tree is found all over the sanctuary.

== Wildlife ==
The main mammalian species in the sanctuary are: Rhesus macaque, langur, Indian elephant, sambar, leopard, spotted deer, barking deer, sloth bear, jungle cat, mongoose and dhole. Birds includes peafowl, patridges, quails, hornbills and vultures.

== Stay and visits ==
There is a forest rest house at Lawalong, used by both the forest executives/ staff and tourists. As of 2020, the area has problems due to Maoist activists.
