= Gidhour =

Gidhour Gidhaur
- Village
- Location in Jharkhand, India Gidhour (India)
- Coordinates: 24.179167°N 85.024167°E
- Country: India
- State: Jharkhand
- District: Chatra

Population (2011)
  - Total: 5,520

Languages (*For language details see Gidhour block#Language and religion)
  - Official: Hindi, Urdu
- Time zone: UTC+5:30 (IST)
- PIN: 825103
- Telephone/ STD code: 06541
- Vehicle registration: JH 13
- Lok Sabha constituency: Chatra
- Vidhan Sabha constituency: Simaria
- Website: chatra.nic.in

Gidhour (also written as Gidhaur) is a village and gram panchayat in the Gidhour CD block in the Simaria subdivision of the Chatra district in the Indian state of Jharkhand.

== Geography ==
Cities, towns and locations in Chatra district in North Chotanagpur Division
M: municipality, CT: census town, R: rural/ urban centre, H: historical/ religious centre, P: power plant, T: tourist centre
Abbreviation used - TPS: thermal power station
Owing to space constraints in the small map, the actual locations in a larger map may vary slightly

=== Location ===
Gidhour is located at 24.179167°N 85.024167°E.

=== Area overview ===
The map alongside shows that the forests (mark the light shading), covering around 60% of Chatra district, are evenly spread across the district. It is a plateau area with an elevation of about 450 metres (1,476 ft) above mean sea level. Efforts are on to get the first unit of the NTPC Limited’s North Karanpura Thermal Power Station (3x660 MW), ready in 2021.North Karanpura Coalfield of Central Coalfields Limited, spread over 1,230 square kilometres (470 sq mi) in the southern part of the district, with spill over to neighbouring districts, and having coal reserves of 14 billion tonnes is among the biggest in India. The map provides links to three CCL operational areas.

Note: The map alongside presents some of the notable locations in the district. All places marked in the map are linked in the larger full screen map.

== Demographics ==
According to the 2011 Census of India, Gidhaur (location code 349242) had a total population of 5,520, of which 2,863 (52%) were males and 2,657 (48%) were females. Population in the age range 0–6 years was 848. The total number of literate persons in Gidhaur was 3,510 (75.13% of the population over 6 years).

== Civic administration ==
=== Police station ===
Gidhour police station serves Gidhour CD block.

=== CD block HQ ===
Headquarters of Gidhour CD block is at Gidhour village.
