= Chharwa =

- Village
- Location in Jharkhand, India Chharwa (India)
- Coordinates: 24.0297°N 85.3215°E
- Country: India
- State: Jharkhand
- District: Hazaribagh

Population (2011)
  - Total: 5,974

Languages (*For language details see Katkamsandi (community development block)#Language and religion)
  - Official: Hindi, Urdu
- Time zone: UTC+5:30 (IST)
- Website: hazaribag.nic.in

Chharwa is a village in the Katkamsandi CD block in the Hazaribagh Sadar subdivision of the Hazaribagh district in the Indian state of Jharkhand.

== Geography ==
Hazaribagh City
CT: census town, R: rural/ urban centre, T: tourist centre, C: educational centre, F: facility
Owing to space constraints in the small map, the actual locations in a larger map may vary slightly

=== Location ===
Chharwa is located at 24.0297°N 85.3215°E.

== Chharwa Dam ==
Chharwa Dam, constructed in 1954, is the life line of the Hazaribagh town water supply system. Even with "mammoth" efforts to rejuvenate Chharwa and other water supply reservoirs in Jharkhand, in the parched-dry Hazaribagh summer it often reaches the dying stage, only to be revived by the onset of the monsoons.

As per the Wetlands International Asian Waterbirds Census 2016, there were 1,462 water birds in Chharwa Dam.

Chharwa Dam is home to various vulture species, including the largest and the smallest vultures, the Himalayan griffon vulture and the Egyptian vulture respectively. Critically Endangered species like the Indian Vulture and White Rumped Vulture are also found here.

== Demographics ==
According to the 2011 Census of India, Chharwa had a total population of 843, of which 449 (53%) were males and 394 (47%) were females. Population in the age range 0–6 years was 135. The total number of literate persons in Chharwa was 521 (73.59% of the population over 6 years).

== Transport ==
The Hazaribagh-Katkamsandi Road passes over a part of/ near the Chharwa Dam. The Koderma-Hazaribagh-Barkakana-Ranchi line, running from Katkamsandi to Hazaribagh in this sector, passes in between the Chharwa Dam and Gonda Dam
