= Marai Kalan =

- Census Town
- Location in Jharkhand, India Marai Kalan (India)
- Coordinates: 24.019444°N 85.356982°E
- Country: India
- State: Jharkhand
- District: Hazaribagh

Government
  - Type: Federal democracy

Area
  - Total: 2.77 km^{2} (1.07 sq mi)

Population (2011)
  - Total: 10,447
  - Density: 3,770/km^{2} (9,770/sq mi)

Languages (*For language details see Sadar, Hazaribagh (community development block)#Language and religion)
  - Official: Hindi, Urdu
- Time zone: UTC+5:30 (IST)
- PIN: 825301
- Telephone/ STD code: 06546
- Vehicle registration: JH 02
- Lok Sabha constituency: Hazaribagh
- Vidhan Sabha constituency: Hazaribagh
- Website: hazaribag.nic.in

Marai Kalam is a census town in the Sadar, Hazaribagh CD block in the Hazaribagh Sadar subdivision of the Hazaribagh district in the Indian state of Jharkhand.

== Geography ==
Hazaribagh City
CT: census town, R: rural/ urban centre, T: tourist centre, C: educational centre, F: facility
Owing to space constraints in the small map, the actual locations in a larger map may vary slightly

=== Location ===
Marai Kalan is located at 24.019444°N 85.356982°E.

== Demographics ==
According to the 2011 Census of India, Marai Kalan (location code 368579) had a total population of 10,447, of which 5,402 (52%) were males and 5,045 (48%) were females. Population in the age range 0–6 years was 157. The total number of literate persons in Marai Kalan was 7,230 (81.47% of the population over 6 years).

== Infrastructure ==
According to the District Census Handbook 2011, Hazaribagh, Marai Kalan covered an area of 2.77 km^{2}. Among the civic amenities, it had 7 km roads with open drains, the protected water supply involved uncovered wells, hand pumps. It had 1,476 domestic electric connections, 14 road lighting points. Among the educational facilities it had 6 primary schools, 3 middle schools, the nearest secondary school, senior secondary school at Hazaribagh 4 km away.
