= Kunda, Chatra =

Kunda
- Village
- Location in Jharkhand, India Kunda (India)
- Coordinates: 24.209722°N 84.655278°E
- Country: India
- State: Jharkhand
- District: Chatra

Population (2011)
  - Total: 2,989

Languages (*For language details see Kunda block#Language and religion)
  - Official: Hindi, Urdu
- Time zone: UTC+5:30 (IST)
- PIN: 825404
- Telephone/ STD code: 06541
- Vehicle registration: JH 13
- Lok Sabha constituency: Chatra
- Vidhan Sabha constituency: Chatra
- Website: chatra.nic.in

Kunda is a village and gram panchayat in the Kunda CD block in the Chatra subdivision of the Chatra district in the Indian state of Jharkhand.

== History ==
Kunda fort was strongly fortified and located on a hill in the later medieval period. In 1660, Daud Khan, the Mughal governor of Bihar during the reign of Aurangzeb, occupied the fort and completely destroyed it. Later in the same century, a rebuilt Kunda fort came under the possession of Raja of Ramgarh. In 1734, Alivardi Khan conquered and destroyed it.

With the East India Company acquiring the diwani of Bengal, Bihar and Odisha in 1765, it derived the right to collect revenue from the estates of Ramgarh, Kharagdiha, Kendi and Kunda. In 1769, the area came in contact with the British when Captain Camac visited the area with the objective of establishing some sort of order in the "Jungleterry" region. In 1771, Capt. Camac subdued the Rajas of Kharagdiha and Kunda. Although the Kol uprising of 1829-1839 did not seriously affect the area, its administrative structure was altered. The parganas of Ramgarh, Kharagdiha, Kendi and Kunda "became parts of the south-west frontier agency and formed into a division named Hazaribagh with Hazaribagh as the administrative headquarters."

The ruins of old Kunda palace/ fort can still be seen in a dilapidated condition some 3–4 miles from the present Kunda village. The present structure was possibly built in the late 17th/ early 18th century. Of particular interest to tourists is an intriguing cave, half a mile from the old palace. Every year on 14th Phalguna/ Maha Shivaratri, there is a large gathering.

== Geography ==
Cities, towns and locations in Chatra district in North Chotanagpur Division
M: municipality, CT: census town, R: rural/ urban centre, H: historical/ religious centre, P: power plant, T: tourist centre
Abbreviation used - TPS: thermal power station
Owing to space constraints in the small map, the actual locations in a larger map may vary slightly

=== Location ===
Kunda is located at 24.209722°N 84.655278°E.

=== Area overview ===
The map alongside shows that the forests (mark the light shading), covering around 60% of Chatra district, are evenly spread across the district. It is a plateau area with an elevation of about 450 metres (1,476 ft) above mean sea level. Efforts are on to get the first unit of the NTPC Limited’s North Karanpura Thermal Power Station (3x660 MW), ready in 2021.North Karanpura Coalfield of Central Coalfields Limited, spread over 1,230 square kilometres (470 sq mi) in the southern part of the district, with spill over to neighbouring districts, and having coal reserves of 14 billion tonnes is among the biggest in India. The map provides links to three CCL operational areas.

Note: The map alongside presents some of the notable locations in the district. All places marked in the map are linked in the larger full screen map.

== Demographics ==
According to the 2011 Census of India, Kunda (location code 348474) had a total population of 2,989, of which 1,554 (52%) were males and 1,435 (48%) were females. Population in the age range 0–6 years was 626. The total number of literate persons in Kunda was 1,232 (52.14% of the population over 6 years).

== Civic administration ==
=== Police station ===
Kunda police station serves Kunda CD block.

=== CD block HQ ===
Headquarters of Kunda CD block is at Kunda village.
