= Khapriaon =

- Village
- Location in Jharkhand, India Khapriaon (India)
- Coordinates: 23.9512°N 85.3473°E
- Country: India
- State: Jharkhand
- District: Hazaribagh

Population (2011)
  - Total: 4,926

Languages (*For language details see Katkamdag (community development block)#Language and religion)
  - Official: Hindi, Urdu
- Time zone: UTC+5:30 (IST)
- Vehicle registration: JH 02
- Website: hazaribag.nic.in

Khapriaon is a village in Katkamdag CD block in the Hazaribagh Sadar subdivision of the Hazaribagh district in the Indian state of Jharkhand.

== Narsingsthan ==
Narsingsthan is a popular religious site in Khapriaon village on Hazaribagh-Barkagaon Road. It is 6 km from Hazaribagh. There is an idol of Lord Narsing, an avatar of the Hindu god Vishnu, and a Shiva lingam in the main temple. There also are other temples dedicated to Dashavatara, Suryadev, Maa Kali and Hanumanji. Around 200 devotees visit the place daily and many religious ceremonies are held throughout the year. A big fair is held every year on the occasion of Kartik Purnima (November-December).

== Geography ==
Cities, towns and locations in Hazaribagh district in North Chotanagpur Division
Some census towns and locations around Hazaribagh city have been shown in the Hazaribagh City map
M: municipality, CT: census town, R: rural/ urban centre, T: tourist centre, D: dam, HS: hot spring
Owing to space constraints in the small map, the actual locations in a larger map may vary slightly

=== Location ===
Khapriaon is located at 23.9512°N 85.3473°E.

=== Area overview ===
Hazaribagh district is a plateau area and forests occupy around about 45% of the total area. It is a predominantly rural area with 92.34% of the population living in rural areas against 7.66% in the urban areas. There are many census towns in the district, as can be seen in the map alongside. Agriculture is the main occupation of the people but with the extension of coal mines, particularly in the southern part of the district, employment in coal mines is increasing. However, it has to be borne in mind that modern mining operations are highly mechanised. Four operational areas of Central Coalfields are marked on the map. All these areas are spread across partly this district and partly the neighbouring districts.

Note: The map alongside presents some of the notable locations in the district. All places marked in the map are linked in the larger full screen map. Urbanisation data calculated on the basis of census data for CD blocks and may vary a little against unpublished official data.

== Demographics ==
According to the 2011 Census of India, Khapriaon had a total population of 4,926, of which 2,601 (53%) were males and 2,321 (47%) were females. Population in the age range 0-6 years was 851. The total number of literate persons in Khapriaon was 3,052 (74.90% of the population over 6 years).

== Transport ==
State Highway 7 (Hazaribagh-Tandwa-Tangar Road) passes through Khapriaon.
