= Amrapali & Chandragupta Area =

- Location in Jharkhand Amrapali & Chadragupta Area (India)
- Location: North Karanpura Coalfield; 23.8941°N 85.0005°E
- Company: Central Coalfields Limited
- Website: centralcoalfields.in/cmpny/hstry.php

Amrapali & Chandragupta Area is one of the operational areas of the Central Coalfields Limited located in the Tandwa CD block of the Chatra district and the Keredari CD block in the Hazaribagh district in the state of Jharkhand, India.

== Overview ==
North Karanpura Coalfield has reserves of 14 billion tonnes of coal (proved, indicated and inferred), around 9% of India's total coal reserves, placing it among the biggest coalfields in India. Only a small corner of this coalfield was exploited earlier.

Future mega projects in the area include: Magadh opencast project expansion with nominal capacity of 51 million tonnes per year and peak capacity of 70 million tonnes per year, Amrapali OCP expansion with nominal capacity 25 MTY and peak capacity of 35 MTY, Sanghamitra OCP with nominal capacity of 20 MTY and peak capacity of 27 MTY, and Chandragupta OCP with nominal capacity of 15 MTY and peak capacity of 20 MTY.

== Mining activity ==
Collieries in the North Karanpura Coalfield except the North Karanpura Area
U: Underground colliery, O: Open cast colliery, A: Administrative headquarters, CT: census town, R: rural/urban centre
Locations of new mine sites are approximate.
Owing to space constraints in the small map, the actual locations in a larger map may vary slightly.
Cities, towns and locations in Hazaribagh district in North Chotanagpur Division
Some census towns and locations around Hazaribagh city have been shown in the Hazaribagh City map.
M: Municipality, CT: Census town, R: Rural/urban centre, T: Tourist centre, D: Dam, HS: Hot spring
Owing to space constraints in the small map, the actual locations in a larger map may vary slightly.

=== Mines and projects ===
Amrapali open cast project in the North Karanpura Coalfield is located in the Chatra district and supplies coal to Barh Super Thermal Power Station. It has an annual rated capacity of 12 million tonnes per year. With a mineable reserve of 124.79 million tonnes, it has a life of 11 years, as on 31 March 2018. It operates in two geological blocks: Amrapali and Krishnapur. An 80 km metalled road connecting Tandwa with Hazaribagh, via Simaria passes through the area.

As of 2020, as per a newspaper report, Central Coalfields Limited has initiated steps for acquisition of 3331.50 acres of land in seven villages (6 in Keredari CD block in Hazaribagh district and one in Tandwa CD block in Chatra district) for the Chandragupta open cast project. The announcement is being made in the villages with the beating of drums. Quoting company officials, the report says that the area has reserves of 600 million tonnes of coal, and annual production target is 20 million tonnes.

== Land acquisition ==
Coal India acquires land for coal mining under the Coal Bearing Areas (Acquisition and Development) Act 1957 (CBA Act in short). A declaration of intention to acquire land in the government gazette is enough. There is no requirement of consultation with the affected communities. An affected person can file an objection with the office of the Coal Controller, under the Ministry of Coal, within 30 days of the notice of acquisition. The Coal Controller makes a recommendation to the central government about it.

== Medical facilities ==
In the North Karanpura Coalfield, CCL has the following facilities:

Central Hospital at Dakra, with 50 beds, has 11 general duty medical officers and one specialist. Its facilities include X-ray, ECG, semi auto analyzer, monitor defibrillator, and dental chair. It has two ambulances.

Piparwar Hospital at Bachra, with 11 beds, has six general duty medical officers and one specialist. Its facilities include cardiac monitor, suction machine, X-ray machine and ECG. It has four ambulances.

There are central facilities in the Central Hospital, Gandhinagar at Kanke Road, Ranchi with 250 beds, and in the Central Hospital, Naisarai at Ramgarh with 150 beds.

There are dispensaries at Rohini, KDH, Purnadih/Karkatta in North Karanapura Area, at Amrapali Project, Magadh Project in the Magadh Sanghamitra Area, and at Tetariakhad in the Rajhara Area.
