= Katkamdag =

- Village
- Location in Jharkhand, India Katkamdag (India)
- Coordinates: 23.9857°N 85.2918°E
- Country: India
- State: Jharkhand
- District: Hazaribagh

Population (2011)
  - Total: 2,334

Languages (*For language details see Katkamdag (community development block)#Language and religion)
  - Official: Hindi, Urdu
- Time zone: UTC+5:30 (IST)
- PIN: 825302 (College More)
- Telephone/ STD code: 06546
- Vehicle registration: JH 02
- Website: hazaribag.nic.in

Katkamdag is a village in the Katkamdag CD block in the Hazaribagh Sadar subdivision of the Hazaribagh district in the Indian state of Jharkhand.

== Geography ==
Cities, towns and locations in Hazaribagh district in North Chotanagpur Division
Some census towns and locations around Hazaribagh city have been shown in the Hazaribagh City map
M: municipality, CT: census town, R: rural/ urban centre, T: tourist centre, D: dam, HS: hot spring
Owing to space constraints in the small map, the actual locations in a larger map may vary slightly

=== Location ===
Katkamdag is located at 23.9857°N 85.2918°E.

=== Area overview ===
Hazaribagh district is a plateau area and forests occupy around about 45% of the total area. It is a predominantly rural area with 92.34% of the population living in rural areas against 7.66% in the urban areas. There are many census towns in the district, as can be seen in the map alongside. Agriculture is the main occupation of the people but with the extension of coal mines, particularly in the southern part of the district, employment in coal mines is increasing. However, it has to be borne in mind that modern mining operations are highly mechanised. Four operational areas of Central Coalfields are marked on the map. All these areas are spread across partly this district and partly the neighbouring districts.

Note: The map alongside presents some of the notable locations in the district. All places marked in the map are linked in the larger full screen map. Urbanisation data calculated on the basis of census data for CD blocks and may vary a little against unpublished official data.

== Civic administration ==
=== CD block HQ ===
The headquarters of Katkamdag CD block is located at Katkamdag.

== Demographics ==
According to the 2011 Census of India Katkamdag (referred to in census data as Katamdag) had a total population of 2,334, of which 1,189 (51%) were males and 1,145 (49%) were females. Population in the age range 0-6 years was 396. The total number of literate persons in Katkamdag was 1,305 (67.34% of the population over 6 years).

== Transport ==
Katkamdag is on Hazaribagh-Simariya Road.
