= Barkagaon =

- Village
- Location in Jharkhand, India Barkagaon (India)
- Coordinates: 23°51′19″N 85°12′54″E
- Country: India
- State: Jharkhand
- District: Hazaribagh

Government
  - Type: Federal democracy

Population (2011)
  - Total: 11,689

Languages (*For language details see Barkagaon (community development block)#Language and religion)
  - Official: Hindi, Urdu
- Time zone: UTC+5:30 (IST)
- PIN: 825311 (Barkagaon)
- Telephone/ STD code: 06551
- Vehicle registration: JH 02
- Website: hazaribag.nic.in

Barkagaon is a village in the Barkagaon CD block in the Hazaribagh Sadar subdivision of the Hazaribagh district in the Indian state of Jharkhand.

== Geography ==
Cities, towns and locations in Hazaribagh district in North Chotanagpur Division
Some census towns and locations around Hazaribagh city have been shown in the Hazaribagh City map
M: municipality, CT: census town, R: rural/ urban centre, T: tourist centre, D: dam, HS: hot spring
Owing to space constraints in the small map, the actual locations in a larger map may vary slightly

=== Location ===
Barkagaon is located at 23.8651°N 85.2167°E.

=== Area overview ===
Hazaribagh district is a plateau area and forests occupy around about 45% of the total area. It is a predominantly rural area with 92.34% of the population living in rural areas against 7.66% in the urban areas. There are many census towns in the district, as can be seen in the map alongside. Agriculture is the main occupation of the people but with the extension of coal mines, particularly in the southern part of the district, employment in coal mines is increasing. However, it has to be borne in mind that modern mining operations are highly mechanised. Four operational areas of Central Coalfields are marked on the map. All these areas are spread across partly this district and partly the neighbouring districts.

Note: The map alongside presents some of the notable locations in the district. All places marked in the map are linked in the larger full screen map. Urbanisation data calculated on the basis of census data for CD blocks and may vary a little against unpublished official data.

== Civic administration ==
=== Police station ===
Barkagaon police station serves the Barkagaon CD block.

=== CD block HQ ===
The headquarters of Barkagaon CD block are located at Barkagaon.

== Demographics ==
According to the 2011 Census of India, Barkagaon had a total population of 11,689, of which 6,023 (52%) were males and 5,666 (48%) were females. Population in the age range 0-6 years was 1,697. The total number of literate persons in Barkagaon was 7,187 (71.93% of the population over 6 years).

== Transport ==
State Highway 7 passes through Barkagaon.

== Education ==
Karnapura College, a degree college, established in 1992 at Barkagaon, is affiliated to Vinoba Bhave University. It offers courses in arts and science and has hostel facilities.

Indira Gandhi Memorial Inter College at Barkagaon was established in 2008.

Kautilya Mahila Inter College at Barkagaon was established in 2014.

Adarsh Madhya Vidyalaya( Model Middle School) is a prominent institution of Primary Education established in 1950. First Headmaster of this school was Kamruddin Ahmed awardee of President award.
