= Gidhour block =

Gidhour
- Community development block
- Location in Jharkhand, India Gidhour (India)
- Coordinates: 24°10′45″N 85°01′27″E
- Country: India
- State: Jharkhand
- District: Chatra
- CD block: Gidhour

Government
  - Type: Federal democracy

Area
  - Total: 174.19 km^{2} (67.26 sq mi)
- Elevation: 386 m (1,266 ft)

Population (2011)
  - Total: 40,919
  - Density: 234.91/km^{2} (608.41/sq mi)

Languages
  - Official: Hindi, Urdu
- Time zone: UTC+5:30 (IST)
- PIN: 825103
- Telephone/STD code: 06541
- Vehicle registration: JH-13
- Literacy: 68.08%
- Lok Sabha constituency: Chatra
- Vidhan Sabha constituency: Simaria
- Website: chatra.nic.in

Gidhour (also spelled Gidhaur) is a community development block that forms an administrative division in Simaria subdivision of Chatra district, Jharkhand state, India.

== Overview ==
Chatra district forms a part of the Upper Hazaribagh Plateau, Lower Hazaribagh Plateau and northern scarp. Located at an elevation of about 450 metres (1,476 ft), the general slope of the district is from north to south. Red laterite acidic soil predominates in an area that is primarily dependent upon rain-fed agriculture. Around 60% of the district is covered with forests. The district has a population density of 275 persons per km^{2}. Around two-thirds of the families in the district live below poverty line. In the extreme south of the district some portions of Tandwa CD Block are part of North Karanpura Coalfield.

== Maoist activities ==
Jharkhand is one of the states affected by Maoist activities. As of 2012, Chatra was one of the 14 highly affected districts in the state. 5 persons were killed in Chatra district in 2012, but Maoist activities, such as arms training camps and organisation of ‘Jan Adalats’ (kangaroo courts) were on the decline. As of 2016, Chatra was identified as one of the 13 focus areas by the state police to check Maoist activities.

== Geography ==
Gidhour is located at 24°10′45″N 85°1′27″E.

Gidhour CD block is bounded by Kanhachatti and Itkhori CD blocks in the north, Katkamsandi CD block, in Hazaribagh district, in the east, Pathalgada CD block in the south and Chatra CD block in the west.

Gidhour CD block has an area of 174.19 km^{2}.Gidhour police station serves this block. The headquarters of Gidhour CD block is at Gidhour village.

There are 6 panchayats and 38 villages in Gidhour CD block.

Gram panchayats of Gidhour CD block/ panchayat samiti are: Manjhganwa, Barisakhi, Gidhour, Pahra, Bariatu and Dwari.

== Demographics ==
=== Population ===
According to the 2011 Census of India, Gidhaur CD block had a total population of 40,919, all of which were rural. There were 20,910 (51%) males and 20,009 (49%) females. Population in the age range 0–6 years was 7,647. Scheduled Castes numbered 9,834 (24.03%) and Scheduled Tribes numbered 704 (1.72%).

=== Literacy ===
As per the 2011 census, the total number of literate persons in Gidhaur CD block was 22,651 (68.08% of the population over 6 years) out of which males numbered 13,228 (77.93% of the male population over 6 years) and females numbered 9,423 (47.13% of the female population over 6 years). The gender disparity (the difference between female and male literacy rates) was 30.80%.

As per 2011 census, literacy in Chatra district was 60.18% Literacy in Jharkhand (for population over 7 years) was 66.41% in 2011. Literacy in India in 2011 was 74.04%.

See also – List of Jharkhand districts ranked by literacy rate

Literacy in CD Blocks of
Chatra district
Shaligram Ramnarayanpur – 54.83
Pratappur – 53.19%
Kunda – 44.84%
Lawalong – 49.02%
Chatra – 55.54%
Kanhachatti – 62.88%
Itkhori – 62.90%
Mayurhand – 64.41%
Gidhour – 68.07%
Pathalgada – 67.39%
Simaria – 63.40%
Tandwa – 62.74%
Source: 2011 Census: CD Block Wise
Primary Census Abstract Data

=== Language and religion ===
Religions in Gidhour CD block (2011)
| Religion | Percent |
| Hinduism | 84.95% |
| Islam | 13.64% |
| Sarna | 0.71% |
| Christianity | 0.62% |
| Other or not stated | 0.08% |

Hindi is the official language in Jharkhand and Urdu has been declared as an additional official language.

Languages of Gidhour CD block (2011)
1. Hindi (73.1%)
2. Khortha (20.3%)
3. Urdu (5.39%)
4. Others (1.17%)

At the time of the 2011 census, 73.12% of the population spoke Hindi, 20.32% Khortha and 5.39% Urdu as their first language.

== Rural poverty ==
Total number of BPL households in Gidhour CD block in 2002-2007 was 5,451. According to 2011 census, number of households in Gidhour CD block was 6,930. Rural poverty in Jharkhand declined from 66% in 1993–94 to 46% in 2004–05. In 2011, it has come down to 39.1%.

== Economy ==
=== Livelihood ===
Livelihood
in Gidhour CD block
1. Cultivators (43.0%)
2. Agricultural labourers (42.2%)
3. Household industries (1.24%)
4. Other Workers (13.5%)

In Gidhour CD block in 2011, among the class of total workers, cultivators numbered 6,854 and formed 43.03%, agricultural labourers numbered 6,729 and formed 42.24%, household industry workers numbered 197 and formed 1.24% and other workers numbered 2,150 and formed 13.50%. Total workers numbered 15,930 and formed 38.93% of the total population, and non-workers numbered 24,989 and formed 61.07% of the population.

=== Infrastructure ===
There are 38 inhabited villages in Gidhour CD block. In 2011, 21 villages had power supply. 38 villages had well water (covered/ uncovered), 38 villages had hand pumps, and all villages had drinking water facility. 9 villages had post offices, 4 villages had sub post offices, 1 village had telephone (land line), 21 villages had mobile phone coverage. 37 villages had pucca (paved) village roads, 9 villages had bus service (public/ private), 5 villages had autos/ modified autos, 9 villages had taxi/vans and 12 villages had tractors. 1 village had bank branch. 14 villages had public distribution system, 5 villages had weekly haat (market) and 14 villages had assembly polling stations.

=== Agriculture ===
Chatra is a predominantly forest district with 65% of the land area being covered with forests. The balance 35% of the area has both rocky and alluvial soil. Alluvial soil is found mostly near river valleys. Rice is the main crop of the district. Other important crops grown are bajra, maize and pulses (mainly arhar and gram).

=== Backward Regions Grant Fund ===
Chatra district is listed as a backward region and receives financial support from the Backward Regions Grant Fund. The fund created by the Government of India is designed to redress regional imbalances in development. As of 2012, 272 districts across the country were listed under this scheme. The list includes 21 districts of Jharkhand.

== Education ==
According to the District Census Handbook, Chatra, 2011 census, Gidhour CD block had 12 villages with pre-primary schools, 36 villages with primary schools, 16 villages with middle schools, 2 villages with secondary schools, 1 village with senior secondary school, 2 villages with no educational facility.
.*Note: Senior secondary schools are also known as Inter colleges in Jharkhand

== Healthcare ==
According to the District Census Handbook, Chatra, 2011 census, Gidhour CD block had 8 villages with primary health subcentres, 1 village with allopathic hospital, 1 village with dispensaries, 1 village with family welfare centre, 6 villages with medicine shops.
.*Note: Private medical practitioners, alternative medicine etc. not included
