= State Highway 7 (Jharkhand) =

State highway in Jharkhand, India

State Highway 7

Route information
- Length: 130 km (81 mi)

Major junctions
- From: Hazaribagh
- To: Bijupada/ Tangor

Location
- Country: India
- State: Jharkhand
- Districts: Hazaribagh district, Chatra district, Ranchi district

Highway system
- Roads in India; Expressways; National; State; Asian; State Highways in Jharkhand

State Highway 7 (SH 7) is a state highway in Jharkhand, India.

== Route ==
SH 7 originates from its junction with National Highway 20 at Hazaribagh and passes through Khapriaon, Barkagaon, Keredari, Tandwa, Khelari and terminates at its junction with National Highway 39 at Bijupada.

The total length of SH 7 is 130 km.
