= Simaria subdivision =

- Subdivision
- Location in Jharkhand, India Simaria subdivision (India)
- Coordinates: 25.05°N 87.84°E
- Country: India
- State: Jharkhand
- District: Chatra
- Headquarters: Simaria

Area
  - Total: 2,121.63 km^{2} (819.17 sq mi)

Population
  - Total: 685,694
  - Density: 323.192/km^{2} (837.064/sq mi)

Languages
  - Official: Hindi, Urdu
- Time zone: UTC+5:30 (IST)
- Website: chatra.nic.in

Simaria subdivision is an administrative subdivision of the Chatra district in the North Chotanagpur division in the state of Jharkhand, India.

== History ==
The subdivision was created in March 2014.

== Administrative set up ==
Chatra district has two subdivisions – (1) Chatra subdivision with Chatra, Shalighram Ramnarayanpur (Hunterganj), Itkhori, Pratappur, Kunda, Kanhachatti and Mayurhand CD blocks, and (2) Simaria subdivision with Simaria, Tandwa, Lawalong, Gidhour and Pathalgada CD blocks.

The subdivisions of Chatra district have the following distinctions:

Subdivision	Headquarters	Area km^{2}	Population (2011)	Rural population % (2011)	Urban population % (2011)
Chatra	Chatra	2,121.63	685,694	92.71	7.29
Simaria	Simaria	1,668.95	357,192	96.37	3.63

Cities, towns and locations in Chatra district in North Chotanagpur Division
M: municipality, CT: census town, R: rural/ urban centre, H: historical/ religious centre, P: power plant, T: tourist centre
Abbreviation used - TPS: thermal power station
Owing to space constraints in the small map, the actual locations in a larger map may vary slightly

== Demographics ==
According to the 2011 Census of India data, Simaria subdivision, in Chatra district, had a total population of 357,192. There were 182,424 (51%) males and 174,768 (49%) females. Scheduled castes numbered 109,287 (30.60%) and scheduled tribes numbered 35,648 (9.98%). Literacy rate was 53.58% (for the total population).

See also – List of Jharkhand districts ranked by literacy rate

== Police stations ==
Police stations in Simaria subdivision were at:

1. Simaria
2. Tandwa
3. Piparwar
4. Lawalong
5. Gidhour
6. Pathalgada

== Blocks ==
Community development blocks in Simaria subdivision are:

CD Block	Headquarters	Area km^{2}	Population (2011)	SC %	ST %	Literacy rate %	CT
Simaria	Simaria	512.48	107,871	30.12	8.12	63.40	-
Tandwa	Tandwa	455.21	126,319	23.87	16.12	62.74	Bachra
Lawalong	Lawalong	393.86	50,553	57.22	5.32	49.02	-
Gidhour	Gidhour	174.19	40,919	24.03	1.72	68.08	-
Pathalgada	Pathalgada	133.21	31,530	25.14	3.69	67.39	-

== Economy ==
=== North Karanpura Thermal Power Station ===
NTPC Limited is constructing the 3 X 660 MW North Karanpura Thermal Power Station at Tandwa at an appraised current (2015) estimated cost of ₹ 14,366.58 crore. Efforts are on to get the first unit of the North Karanpura Thermal Power Station ready in 2021.

=== Coal mining ===
The North Karanpura Coalfield is spread across parts of Ranchi, Hazaribagh, Chatra and Latehar districts of Jharkhand covering an area of 1,230 km^{2}. This coalfield in the upper reaches of the Damodar Valley, has reserves of around 14 billion tonnes of coal, very little of which has been exploited. Karkatta, KD Hesalong, Manki, Churi, Bachara UG, Bachara OC, and Dakara are long established collieries south of the Damodar. North of the Damodar lies comparatively new major mines such as Piparwar Mine and Ashoka Project. 23 mines are planned in the northern sector. Those in an advanced stage of planning are: Dhadu, Purnadih, Magadh, and Amrapali. This happens to be the largest mining sector of Central Coalfields Limited.

Future mega projects in the area include: Magadh opencast project expansion with nominal capacity of 51 million tonnes per year and peak capacity of 70 million tonnes per year, Amrapali OCP expansion with nominal capacity 25 MTY and peak capacity of 35 MTY, Sanghamitra OCP with nominal capacity of 20 MTY and peak capacity of 27 MTY, and Chandragupta OCP with nominal capacity of 15 MTY and peak capacity of 20 MTY.

== Education ==
In 2011, in Simaria subdivision out of a total 364 inhabited villages there were 121 villages with pre-primary schools, 279 villages with primary schools, 191 villages with middle schools, 22 villages with secondary schools, 7 villages with senior secondary schools, 38 villages with no educational facility.
.*Senior secondary schools are also known as Inter colleges in Jharkhand

=== Educational institutions ===
The following institutions are located in Simaria subdivision:

- Vananchal College was established at Tandwa in 1985. It is affiliated with the Vinoba Bhave University.
- Simaria Degree Mahavidyalaya was established at Simaria in 2015. It is affiliated with the Vinoba Bhave University.

(Information about degree colleges with proper reference may be added here)

== Healthcare ==
In 2011, in Simaria subdivision there were 15 villages with primary health centres, 39 villages with primary health subcentres, 19 villages with maternity and child welfare centres, 20 villages with allopathic hospitals, 13 villages with dispensaries, 10 villages with veterinary hospitals, 15 villages with family welfare centres, 19 villages with medicine shops.
.*Private medical practitioners, alternative medicine etc. not included

=== Medical facilities ===
Piparwar Hospital of Central Coalfields Limited at Bachra with 11 beds has 6 general duty medical officers and 1 specialist. Among the facilities it has are: cardiac monitor, suction machine, X-Ray machine and ECG. It has 4 ambulances.

(Anybody having referenced information about location of government/ private medical facilities may please add it here)
