= Patna–Ranchi Vande Bharat Express =

Mini Vande Bharat Express train route in India

Patna Junction - Ranchi Junction Vande Bharat Express

Overview
- Service type: Vande Bharat Express
- Locale: Bihar and Jharkhand
- First service: 27 June 2023; 3 years ago
- Current operator: East Central Railways (ECR)

Route
- Termini: Patna Junction (PNBE); Ranchi Junction (RNC)
- Stops: 6
- Distance travelled: 380 km (236 mi)
- Average journey time: 06 hrs
- Service frequency: Six days a week (Note: Except Tuesdays)
- Train number: 22349 / 22350
- Lines used: Patna–Gaya line; Gaya–Asansol section (till Koderma Jn); Koderma–Hazaribagh–Barkakana–Ranchi line

On-board services
- Classes: AC Chair Car, AC Executive Chair Car
- Seating arrangements: Airline style; Rotatable seats
- Sleeping arrangements: No
- Catering facilities: On-board catering
- Observation facilities: Large windows in all coaches
- Entertainment facilities: On-board WiFi; Infotainment System; Electric outlets; Reading light; Seat Pockets; Bottle Holder; Tray Table
- Baggage facilities: Overhead racks
- Other facilities: Kavach

Technical
- Rolling stock: Mini Vande Bharat 2.0
- Track gauge: Indian gauge 1,676 mm (5 ft 6 in) broad gauge
- Electrification: 25 kV 50 Hz AC Overhead line
- Operating speed: 63.33 km/h (39 mph) (Avg.)
- Average length: 192 metres (630 ft) (08 coaches)
- Track owner: Indian Railways
- Rake maintenance: Rajendra Nagar Coaching Complex (Patna)

The 22349/22350 Patna - Ranchi Vande Bharat Express is India's 20th Vande Bharat Express train, connecting the city of Patna in Bihar with the city of Ranchi in Jharkhand. The train was flagged off by Prime Minister Narendra Modi on 27 June 2023 via video conference from Rani Kamalapati railway station. Rake sharing with 51st Vande Bharat Express of India 22345/46 Patna Jn (PNBE) - Gomti Nagar (GTNR).

== Overview ==
The train is operated by Indian Railways, connecting Patna Jn, Jehanabad, Gaya Jn, Koderma Jn, Hazaribagh Town, Barkakana Jn, Mesra and Ranchi Jn. It will be operated with train numbers 22349/22350 on a 6 days a week basis.

== Rakes ==
It is the eighteenth 2nd Generation and the sixth Mini Vande Bharat 2.0 Express train which was designed and manufactured by the Integral Coach Factory at Perambur, Chennai under the Make in India Initiative.

== Service ==
The 22349/22350 Patna Jn - Ranchi Jn Vande Bharat Express operates six days a week except Tuesdays, covering a distance of 379 km (235 mi) in a travel time of 6 hours with an average speed of 62 km/h (39 mph). The service has 6 intermediate stops. The Maximum Permissible Speed is 130 km/h (81 mph).

== Incidents ==
On 25 June 2023, before the inaugural run of this new Vande Bharat Express train, it met with a disruptive case after unidentified miscreants pelted stones near the Barkakana Jn under Dhanbad railway division of East Central Railway zone (ECR). This incident took place when it was performing the 3rd trial run while heading back to Patna Jn from Ranchi Jn. No casualties were reported during the incident.

== See also ==
- Vande Bharat Express
- Tejas Express
- Gatimaan Express
- Patna Junction railway station
- Ranchi Junction railway station
- Koderma–Hazaribagh–Barkakana–Ranchi line
