= Salgaon =

- Village
- Location in Jharkhand, India Salgaon (India)
- Coordinates: 23.9967°N 85.3148°E
- Country: India
- State: Jharkhand
- District: Hazaribagh

Population (2011)
  - Total: 3,491

Languages (*For language details see Katkamdag (community development block)#Language and religion)
  - Official: Hindi, Urdu
- Time zone: UTC+5:30 (IST)
- PIN: 825302
- Telephone/ STD code: 06546
- Vehicle registration: JH 02
- Website: hazaribag.nic.in

Salgaon (also referred to as Salgawan) is a village in the Katkamdag CD block in the Hazaribagh Sadar subdivision of the Hazaribagh district in the Indian state of Jharkhand.

== Geography ==
Hazaribagh City
CT: census town, R: rural/ urban centre, T: tourist centre, C: educational centre, F: facility
Owing to space constraints in the small map, the actual locations in a larger map may vary slightly

=== Location ===
Salgaon is located at 23.9967°N 85.3148°E.

== Gonda Dam ==
Gonda Dam, an irrigation project, is located near Salgaon. The dam, constructed across the Gonda River, was completed in 1954. It is 1006.09 m long and 13.41 m high.

As per the Wetlands International Asian Waterbirds Census 2016, there were 603 water birds in Gonda Dam.

== Demographics ==
According to the 2011 Census of India, Salgaon had a total population of 3,491, of which 1,796 (51%) were males and 1,695 (49%) were females. Population in the age range 0–6 years was 542. The total number of literate persons in Salgaon was 2,136 (72.43% of the population over 6 years).

== Transport ==
Salagaon and Gonda Dam are off Lepo Road and link roads connect Lepo Road to both Gonda Dam and Salgaon. There also are other roads from Hazaribagh. The Koderma-Hazaribagh-Barkakana railway line, running from Katkamsandi to Hazaribagh in this sector, passes in between the Chharwa Dam and Gonda Dam
