= Meru, Hazaribagh =

Meru
- Census Town
- Location in Jharkhand, India Meru (India)
- Coordinates: 24°1′46″N 85°27′26″E
- Country: India
- State: Jharkhand
- District: Hazaribagh

Population (2011)
  - Total: 7,780

Languages
  - Official: Hindi, Urdu
- Time zone: UTC+5:30 (IST)
- PIN: 825317 (BSF Meru)
- Telephone/ STD code: 06546
- Vehicle registration: JH 02
- Website: hazaribag.nic.in

Meru is a census town in the Sadar, Hazaribagh CD block in the Hazaribagh Sadar subdivision of the Hazaribagh district in the Indian state of Jharkhand.

== Geography ==
Cities, towns and locations in Hazaribagh district in North Chotanagpur Division
Some census towns and locations around Hazaribagh city have been shown in the Hazaribagh City map
M: municipality, CT: census town, R: rural/ urban centre, T: tourist centre, D: dam, HS: hot spring
Owing to space constraints in the small map, the actual locations in a larger map may vary slightly

=== Location ===
It is located at 24°1′46″N 85°27′26″E.

=== Area overview ===
Hazaribagh district is a plateau area and forests occupy around about 45% of the total area. It is a predominantly rural area with 92.34% of the population living in rural areas against 7.66% in the urban areas. There are many census towns in the district, as can be seen in the map alongside. Agriculture is the main occupation of the people but with the extension of coal mines, particularly in the southern part of the district, employment in coal mines is increasing. However, it has to be borne in mind that modern mining operations are highly mechanised. Four operational areas of Central Coalfields are marked on the map. All these areas are spread across partly this district and partly the neighbouring districts.

Note: The map alongside presents some of the notable locations in the district. All places marked in the map are linked in the larger full screen map. Urbanisation data calculated on the basis of census data for CD blocks and may vary a little against unpublished official data.

== Demographics ==
According to the 2011 Census of India, Meru had a total population of 7,780, of which 4,740 (61%) were males and 3,040 (39%) were females. Population in the age range 0–6 years was 911. The total number of literate persons in Meru was 5,914 (86.10% of the population over 6 years).

As of 2001 India census, Meru had a population of 8,547. Males constitute 66% of the population and females 34%. Meru has an average literacy rate of 75%, higher than the national average of 59.5%: male literacy is 86%, and female literacy is 55%. In Meru, 12% of the population is under 6 years of age.

== Infrastructure ==
According to the District Census Handbook 2011, Hazaribagh, Meru covered an area of 4.37 km^{2}. Among the civic amenities, it had 65 km roads with both open and closed drains, the protected water supply involved uncovered wells, hand pumps. It had 649 domestic electric connections, 35 road lighting points. Among the educational facilities it had 1 primary school, 2 middle schools, 2 secondary schools, 1 senior secondary school. Among the social, recreational and cultural facilities, it had 1 stadium. It had branches of 1 nationalised bank, 1 cooperative bank, 1 agricultural credit society.

== BSF centre ==
Meru has a BSF training centre and school for advance training of counter insurgency, counter terrorism and bomb disposal.

== Education ==
Central School, BSF Camp, Meru, was established in 1979. It is an English-medium coeducational school, teaching from classes I to XII. It has library and computer facilities.

== Transport ==
Meru is 12 km from Hazaribagh, off the Hazaribagh-Bagodar Road.
