= Okni =

- Census Town
- Location in Jharkhand, India Okni (India)
- Coordinates: 24.00°N 85.35°E
- Country: India
- State: Jharkhand
- District: Hazaribag

Population (2011)
  - Total: 11,106

Languages
  - Official: Hindi, Urdu
- Time zone: UTC+5:30 (IST)
- Vehicle registration: JH 02
- Website: hazaribag.nic.in

Okni (mentioned in census records as Okni No. II, a census town) is a neighbourhood of Hazaribagh town in Hazaribagh district in the Indian state of Jharkhand.

== Geography ==
Hazaribagh City
CT: census town, R: rural/ urban centre, T: tourist centre, C: educational centre, F: facility
Owing to space constraints in the small map, the actual locations in a larger map may vary slightly

=== Location ===
Kasai Mohallah is located at 24.00°N 85.35°E.

== Demographics ==
As per the 2011 Census of India Hazaribag Town had a total population of 11,106, of which 5,821 (52%) were males and 5,285 (48%) were females. Population below 6 years was 1,328. The total number of literates in Okni was 8,997 (92.01% of the population over 6 years).

As per 2011 Census of India, Hazaribagh Urban Agglomeration had a total population of 153,599, of which males were 80,095 and females 73,504. Hazaribagh Urban Agglomeration is composed of Hazaribagh (Nagar Parishad) and Okni (Census Town).

As per 2011 census the total number of literates in Hazaribagh UA was 122,881 (90.14 per cent of total population) out of which 66,602 (93.82 percent of males) were males and 56,279 (86.14 percent of females) were females.

As of 2001 India census, Okni No.II had a population of 8,203. Males constitute 54% of the population and females 46%. Okni No.II has an average literacy rate of 78%, higher than the national average of 59.5%: male literacy is 81%, and female literacy is 74%. In Okni No.II, 14% of the population is under 6 years of age.

== Infrastructure ==
Based on the information provided in the District Census Handbook 2011, Hazaribagh, Okni II encompassed an area of 0.85 km^{2}. The locality boasted 15 kilometers of roads, equipped with both open and closed drains. The water supply infrastructure included uncovered wells, tube wells/borewells, and an overhead tank to ensure access to potable water. Moreover, there were 1,767 domestic electric connections and 35 road lighting points to enhance safety and convenience.

In terms of educational amenities, Okni II accommodated 7 primary schools, while additional educational facilities were available in Hazaribagh 3 kilometers away. Furthermore, the locality provided social, recreational, and cultural facilities, including 3 public libraries and reading rooms, fostering intellectual and cultural engagement within the community.

== See also ==
- Sadar, Hazaribagh (community development block)
