= Bachra =

Bachra Kurmi Land
- Census Town
- Location in Jharkhand, India Bachra (India)
- Coordinates: 23°41′19″N 85°4′13″E
- Country: India
- State: Jharkhand
- District: Chatra

Area
  - Total: 16.61 km^{2} (6.41 sq mi)
- Elevation: 377 m (1,237 ft)

Population (2011)
  - Total: 12,969
  - Density: 780.8/km^{2} (2,022/sq mi)

Languages
  - Official: Hindi, Urdu
- Time zone: UTC+5:30 (IST)
- PIN: 829201
- Telephone code: 06531
- Vehicle registration: JH
- Lok Sabha constituency: Hazaribagh
- Vidhan Sabha constituency: Barkagaon
- Website: chatra.nic.in

Bachra is a census town in the Tandwa CD block in the Simaria subdivision of the Chatra district in the state of Jharkhand, India.

== Geography ==
Cities, towns and locations in Chatra district in North Chotanagpur Division
M: municipality, CT: census town, R: rural/ urban centre, H: historical/ religious centre, P: power plant, T: tourist centre
Abbreviation used - TPS: thermal power station
Owing to space constraints in the small map, the actual locations in a larger map may vary slightly

=== Location ===
Bachra is a colliery township located at 23°41′19″N 85°4′13″E.

=== Area overview ===
The map alongside shows that the forests (mark the light shading), covering around 60% of Chatra district, are evenly spread across the district. It is a plateau area with an elevation of about 450 metres (1,476 ft) above mean sea level. Efforts are on to get the first unit of the NTPC Limited’s North Karanpura Thermal Power Station (3x660 MW), ready in 2021.North Karanpura Coalfield of Central Coalfields Limited, spread over 1,230 square kilometres (470 sq mi) in the southern part of the district, with spill over to neighbouring districts, and having coal reserves of 14 billion tonnes is among the biggest in India. The map provides links to three CCL operational areas.

Note: The map alongside presents some of the notable locations in the district. All places marked in the map are linked in the larger full screen map.

== Demographics ==
According to the 2011 Census of India, Bachra (location code 389494) had a total population of 12,969, of which 7,169 (55%) were males and 5,800 (45%) were females. Population in the age range 0–6 years was 1,453. The total number of literate persons in Bachra was 9,718 (84.39% of the population over 6 years).

== Infrastructure ==
According to the District Census Handbook 2011, Chatra, Bachra covered an area of 16.61 km^{2}. Among the civic amenities, it had 26 km roads with both open and closed drains, the protected water supply involved overhead tanks, tap water from treated sources, uncovered wells. It had 2,405 domestic electric connections, 62 road light points. Among the educational facilities it had 13 primary schools, 11 middle schools, 5 secondary schools, 4 senior secondary schools. Among the social, recreational and cultural facilities it had 1 stadium, 3 auditorium/ community halls, 1 public library, reading room. It had the branch office of 2 nationalised banks.

== Economy ==
The North Karanpura Coalfield is spread across parts of Ranchi, Hazaribagh, Chatra and Latehar districts of Jharkhand covering an area of 1,230 km^{2}. This coalfield in the upper reaches of the Damodar Valley, has reserves of around 14 billion tonnes of coal, very little of which has been exploited. Karkatta, KD Hesalong, Manki, Churi, Bachara UG, Bachara OC, and Dakara are long established collieries south of the Damodar. North of the Damodar lies comparatively new major mines such as Piparwar Mine and Ashoka Project. 23 mines are planned in the northern sector (near Bachra). Those in an advanced stage of planning are: Dhadu, Purnadih, Magadh, and Amrapali.This happens to be the largest mining sector of Central Coalfields Limited.

Projects in the Piparwar Area of Central Coalfields Limited (as in 2015) were: Piparwar open cast, Ray-Bachra underground, Ashoka open cast, Piparwar coal handling plant and Piparwar coal preparation plant.

== Transportation ==
Bachra is served by Ray railway station, about 25 km from Barkakana railway station on the Sonnagar-Barkakana loop line.

== Healthcare ==
Piparwar Hospital of CCL at Bachra with 11 beds has 6 general duty medical officers and 1 specialist. Among the facilities it has are: cardiac monitor, suction machine, Dental chair, CBC Machine, Digital X-Ray machine, OPG machine and ECG. It has 4 ambulances.
