= Hazaribagh Town railway station =

Railway station in Jharkhand

HAZARIBAGH TOWN

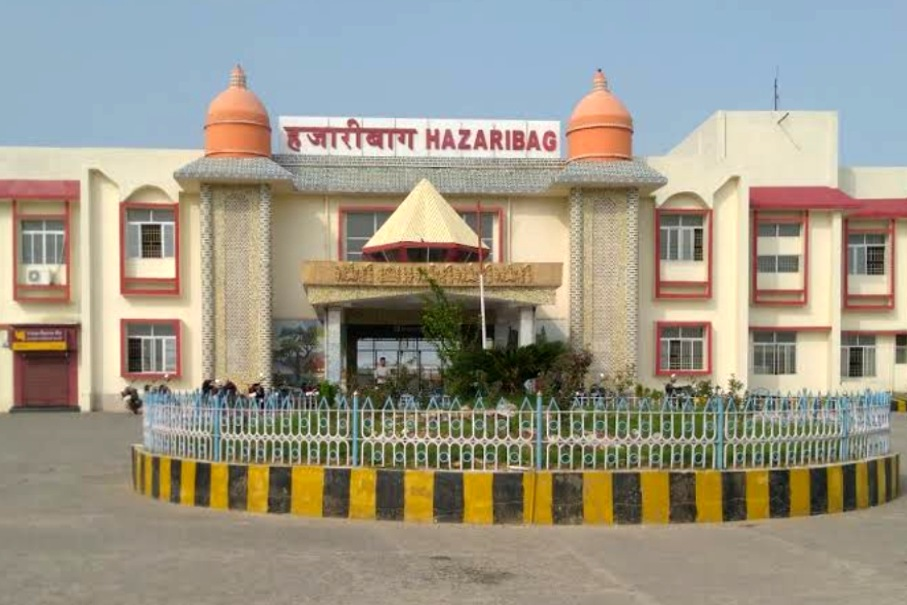
- Hazaribagh Town railway station building

General information
- Location: NH-100, Kud–Rewali, Hazaribagh, Jharkhand; India
- Coordinates: 23°59′01″N 85°20′25″E
- Elevation: 610 m (2,001 ft)
- System: Indian Railways station
- Owner: Indian Railways
- Operator: East Central Railway
- Line: Koderma–Hazaribagh–Barkakana–Ranchi line
- Platforms: 3
- Tracks: 6

Construction
- Parking: Available

Other information
- Status: Functioning
- Station code: HZBN
- Zone(s): East Central Railway
- Division(s): Dhanbad railway division

History
- Opened: 20 February 2018; 8 years ago
Location
- Location within Jharkhand

Hazaribagh Town Railway Station (station code HZBN) is a railway station in India which serves the city of Hazaribagh in the state of Jharkhand. It belongs to East Central Railway of Dhanbad division and is located on NH100, Kumhar Toli in Hazaribagh district of Jharkhand state. Patna - Ranchi Vande Bharat Express also halts at Hazaribagh Town railway station.

== Geography ==
Hazaribagh City
CT: census town, R: rural/ urban centre, T: tourist centre, C: educational centre, F: facility
Owing to space constraints in the small map, the actual locations in a larger map may vary slightly

=== Location ===
Hazaribagh Town railway station is located at 23.9837°N 85.3402°E.

== History ==
This line was announced in Railway Budget 1999 under the rule of Atal Bihari Vajpayee. After 16 years, this dream was fulfilled on 20 February 2015. It was inaugurated by Prime Minister Narendra Modi along with Jharkhand Governor Syed Ahmad, Chief Minister Raghubar Das, Union Railways Minister Suresh Prabhu, Union Minister of State for Railways Manoj Sinha, Union Minister of State for Finance and Hazaribagh MP Jayant Sinha. 57 km long Hazaribagh–Barkakana section was opened for passenger trains on 7 December 2016 by Railway Minister Suresh Prabhu in the presence of Chief Minister Raghubar Das. Also a railway coal siding line has been constructed from Hazaribagh Town to Bandag.

New Railway line between Tatisilwai and Sanki was inaugurated by CM Raghubar Das on 29 August 2019. Two new pairs of passenger trains between Hatia and Sanki station started on 29 August 2019. Trial run on the newly constructed remaining Sidhwar-Sanki 27 kilometer rail section was successful on November 18, 2022. 4 tunnels, 32 curves and five major bridges have been constructed in this 27 km long rail section. Currently Patna - Ranchi Vande Bharat Express runs on this route, which was inaugurated on 27 June 2023 by Narendra Modi through video conferencing from Bhopal.

== Cost of the project ==
The project estimated cost for the full stretch between Koderma–Hazaribagh–Barkakana–Ranchi (total length of 200 kilometers) has an estimated cost of INR 3,000 crores. The railway stretch between Hazaribagh to Koderma, a 79.7 kilometer distance, incurred cost of INR 936 crores. During the inception of project in the year 1999, the estimated cost was around INR 332 crores, however over the period of time, the cost has been escalated to nearly INR 936 crores.

== Trains ==
Hazaribagh Town railway station handles trains six times daily except Tuesday and four times on Tuesday (Patna - Ranchi Vande Bharat Express does not run on Tuesdays). The trains are run by East Central Railway zone. Following are the trains arriving and departing from Hazaribagh Town railway station.

Trains
Sl.No.	Train No.	Train Name
1	22349	Patna–Ranchi Vande Bharat Express
2	22350	Ranchi–Patna Vande Bharat Express
3	13513	Asansol - Hatia Express
4	13514	Hatia - Asansol Express
5	22357	Gaya Weekly SF Express
6	22358	Mumbai LTT Weekly SF Express
7	53371	Koderma–Barkakana Passenger
8	53372	Barkakana–Koderma Passenger
9	53373	Koderma–Barkakana Passenger
10	53374	Barkakana–Koderma Passenger

== Gallery ==
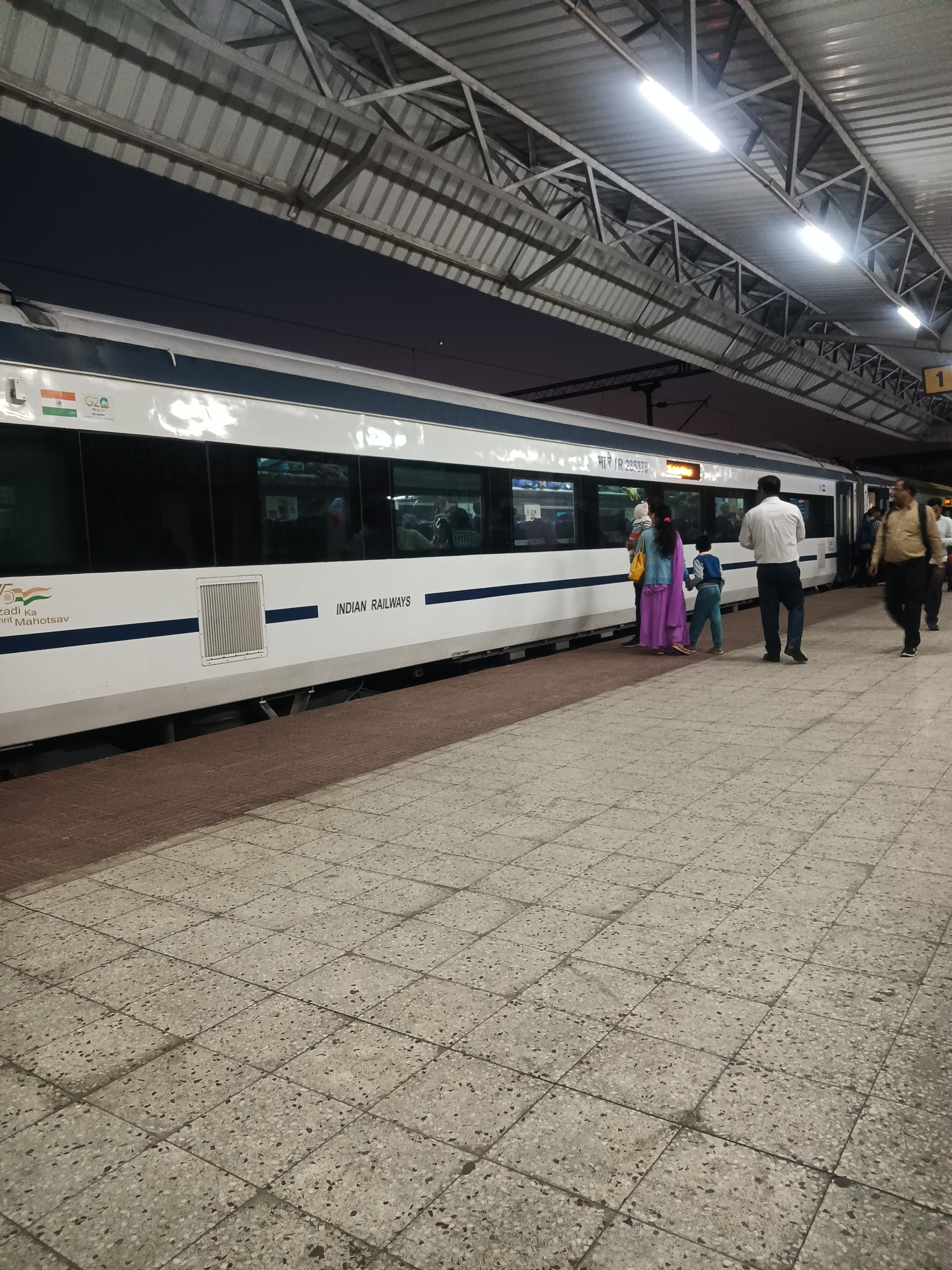
Patna Vande Bharat Express(22350) standing at the station

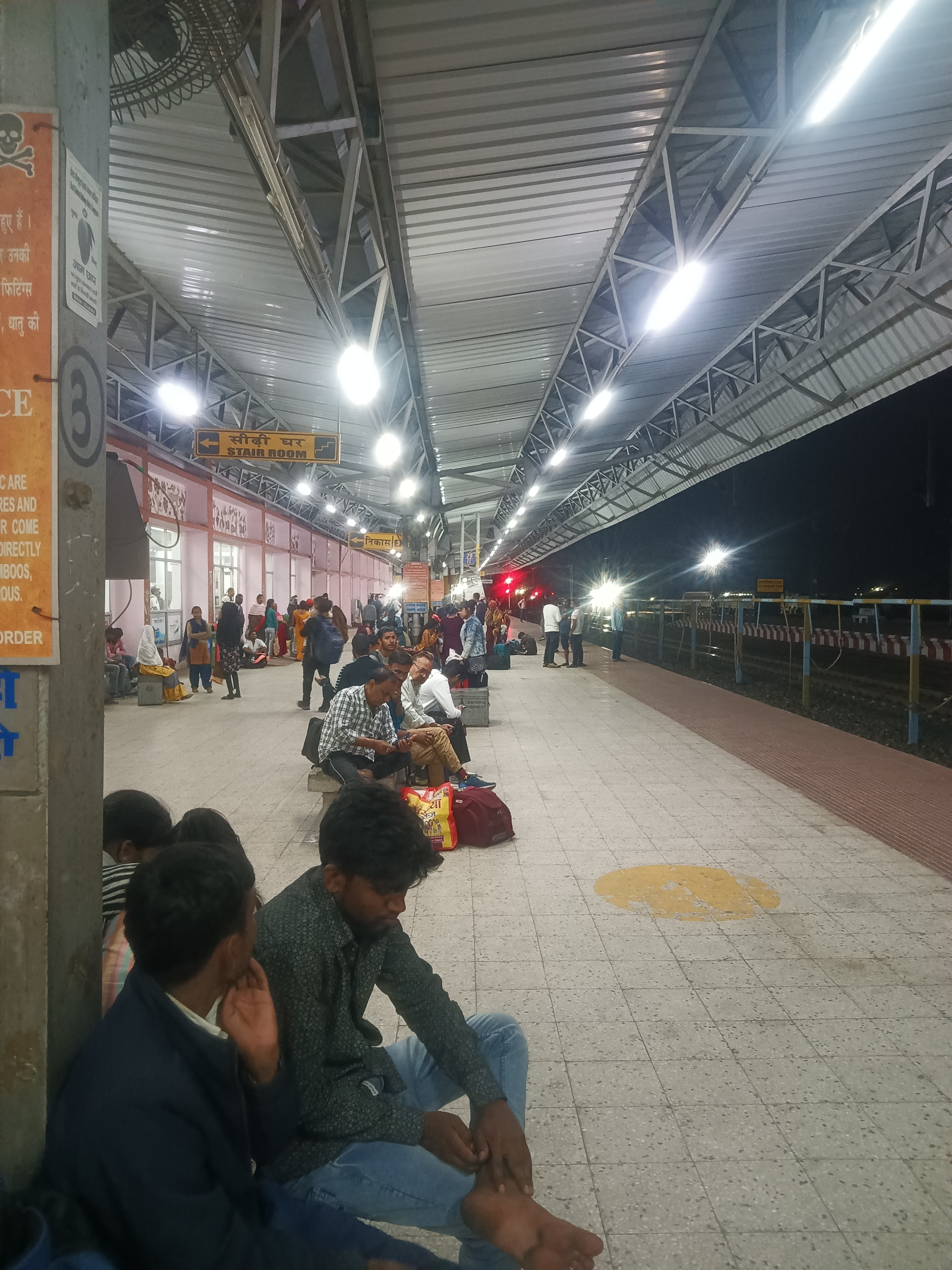
Platform Number 1

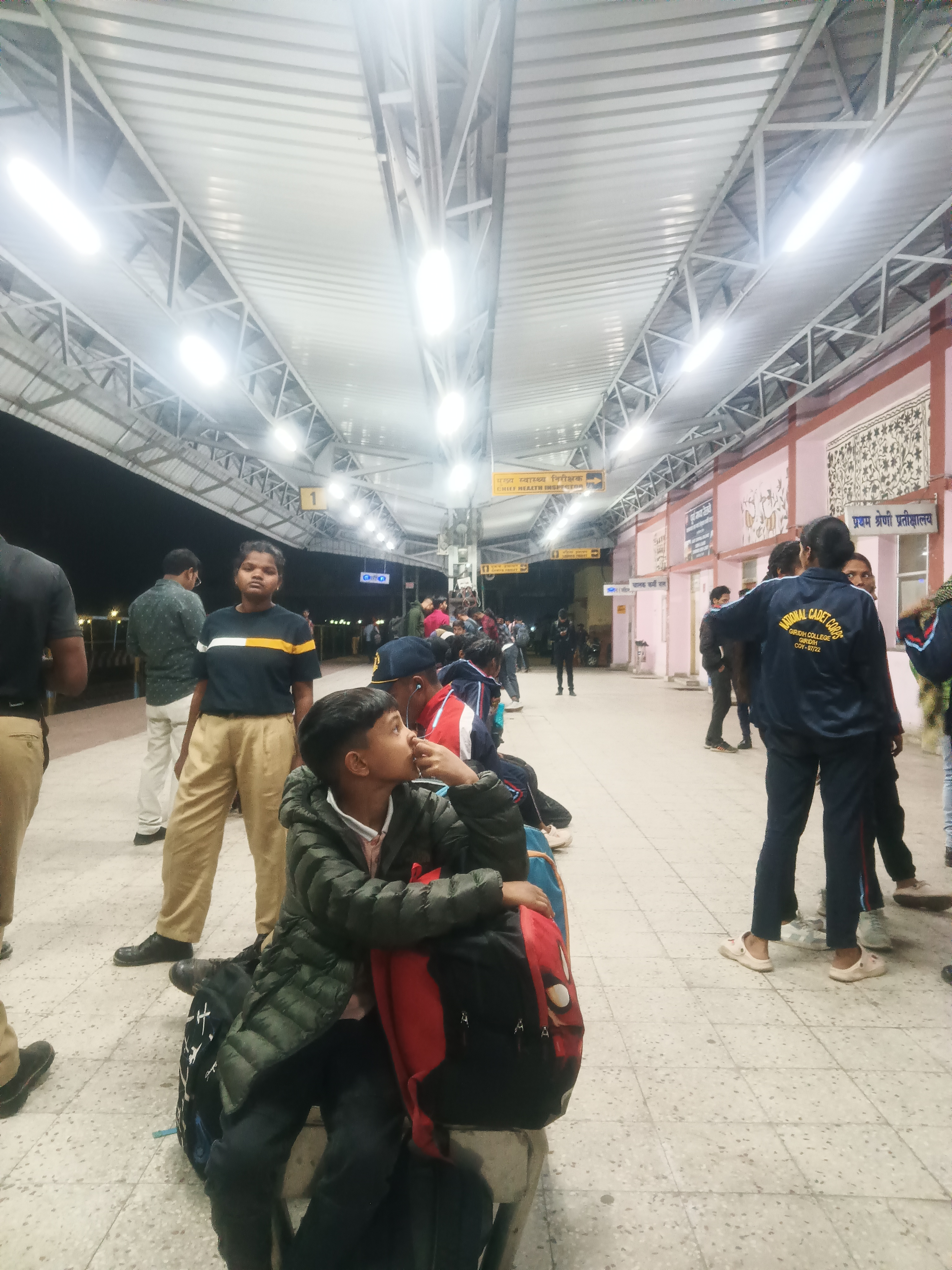
Passengers waiting at the station

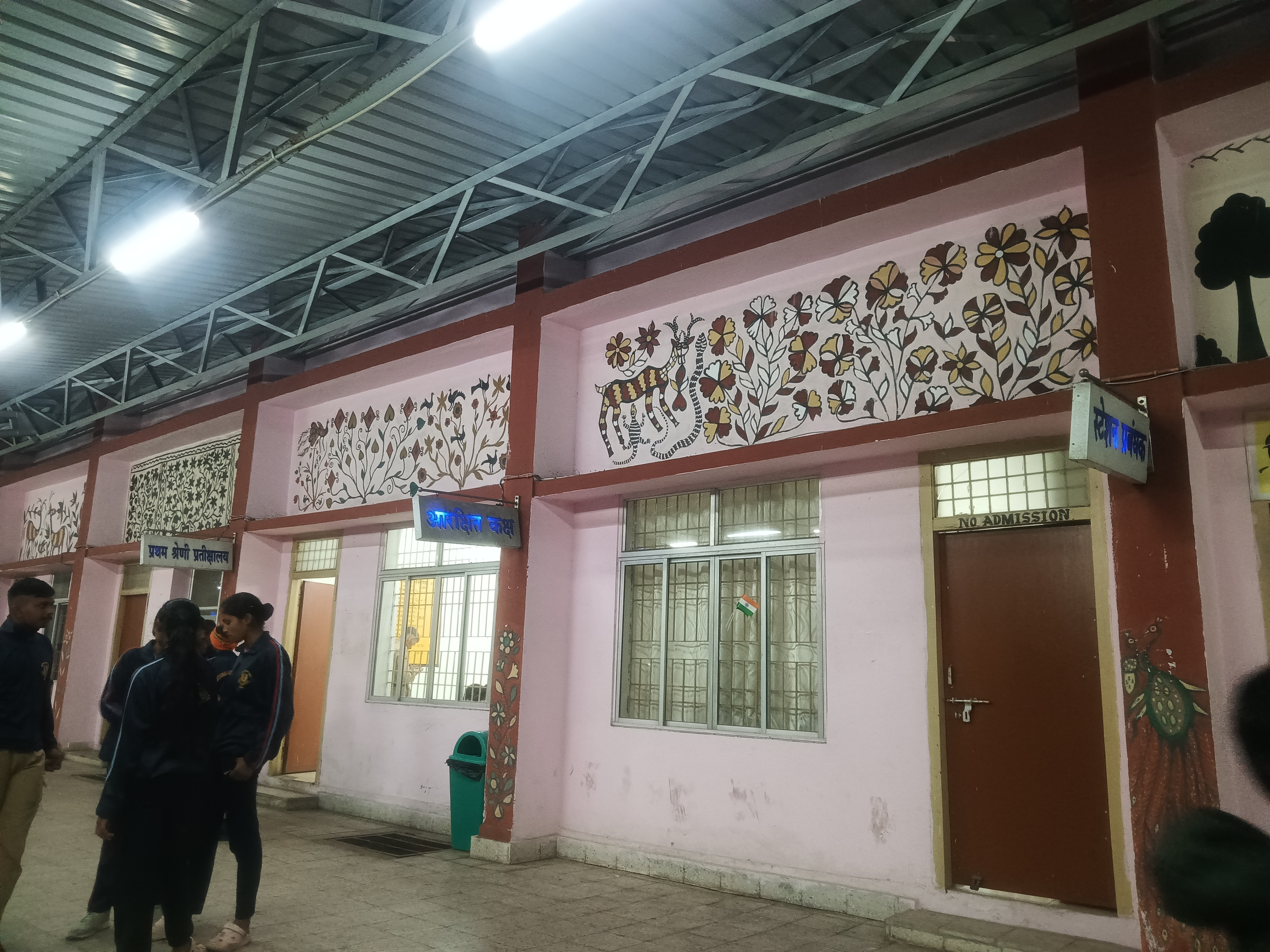
Waiting and other rooms

== See also ==
- Koderma–Hazaribagh–Barkakana–Ranchi line
- Koderma Junction railway station
- Barkakana Junction railway station
- Patna - Ranchi Vande Bharat Express

Preceding station	Indian Railways	Following station
Kanasar Nawada towards ?	East Central Railway zone Koderma–Ranchi section	Bes towards ?
