= Koderma–Hazaribagh–Barkakana–Ranchi line =

Railway route in India

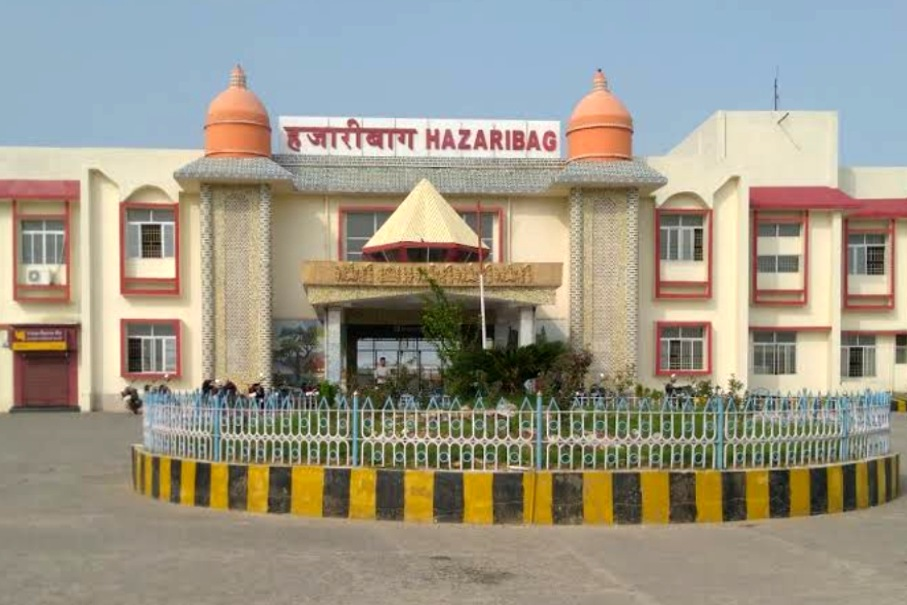
- Hazaribagh Town, an important railway station on Koderma–Hazaribagh–Barkakana–Ranchi line

Overview
- Status: Operational (up to Ranchi)
- Owner: Indian Railways
- Locale: Jharkhand
- Termini: Koderma Junction; Ranchi

Service
- Type: Electric line
- Operator(s): South Eastern Railway, East Central Railway

History
- Opened: 2015 onwards

Technical
- Track length: 211 km
- Track gauge: 5 ft 6 in (1,676 mm) broad gauge
- Electrification: Yes
- Operating speed: 100 km/h (62 mph)

The Koderma–Hazaribagh–Barkakana–Ranchi line is an Indian railway line connecting Koderma Junction in the Asansol–Gaya section with Hazaribagh Town, Barkakana and Ranchi. This 211-kilometre (131 mi) track is under the jurisdiction of South Eastern Railway and East Central Railway.

== History ==
This line was announced in rail budget 1999 under the rule of Atal Bihari Vajpayee. The Koderma–Hazaribagh Town section was completed on 20 February 2015. It was inaugurated by Prime Minister Narendra Modi along with Jharkhand Governor Syed Ahmad, Chief Minister Raghubar Das, Union Railways Minister Suresh Prabhu, Union Minister of State for Railways Manoj Sinha, Union Minister of State for Finance and Hazaribagh MP Jayant Sinha.

The 57 km-long Hazaribagh Town–Barkakana section was opened for passenger trains on 7 December 2016 by Railway Minister Suresh Prabhu in the presence of Chief Minister Raghubar Das. As the line passes through a coal mining belt it will carry a lot of coal, in addition to passenger traffic.

Special passenger train service started on 31 March 2017 from Barkakana Junction to Sidhwar station of Barkakana–Ranchi new line section.

Trial run of passenger train between Tatisilwai and Shanki railway station (31.4 km) of Ranchi–Barkakana new rail line done on 17 January 2018.

New Railway line between Tatisilwai and Sanki was inaugurated by CM Raghubar Das on 29 August 2019. Two new pairs of passenger trains between Hatia and Sanki station started on 29 August 2019.

Trial run on the newly constructed remaining Sidhwar-Sanki 27 kilometer rail section was successful on 18 November 2022. 4 tunnels, 32 curves and five major bridges have been constructed in this 27 km long rail section. Currently Patna - Ranchi Vande Bharat Express runs on this route, which was inaugurated on 27 June 2023 by Narendra Modi through video conferencing from Bhopal.

== Branch line ==
The Tori–Shivpur–Kathuatia line connecting the Hazaribagh–Kodarma line, was planned in 1998 to speed up coal evacuation in the North Karanpura Coalfield. Currently the Tori–Shivpur sector is operationalised with work in the Shivpoor–Kathutia sector under progress.

== Cost of the project ==
The project estimated cost for the full stretch between Koderma–Hazaribagh–Barkakana–Ranchi (total length of 200 kilometers) has an estimated cost of INR 3,000 crores. The railway stretch between Hazaribagh to Koderma, a 79.7 kilometer distance, incurred cost of INR 936 crores. During the inception of project in the year 1999, the estimated cost was around INR 332 crores, however over the period of time, the cost has been escalated to nearly INR 936 crores.

== See also ==
- Hazaribagh Town railway station
- Koderma Junction railway station
- Barkakana Junction railway station
- Patna - Ranchi Vande Bharat Express
