= North Karanpura Thermal Power Station =

Coal-based power plant in Jharkhand

North Karanpura Super Thermal Power Station grah
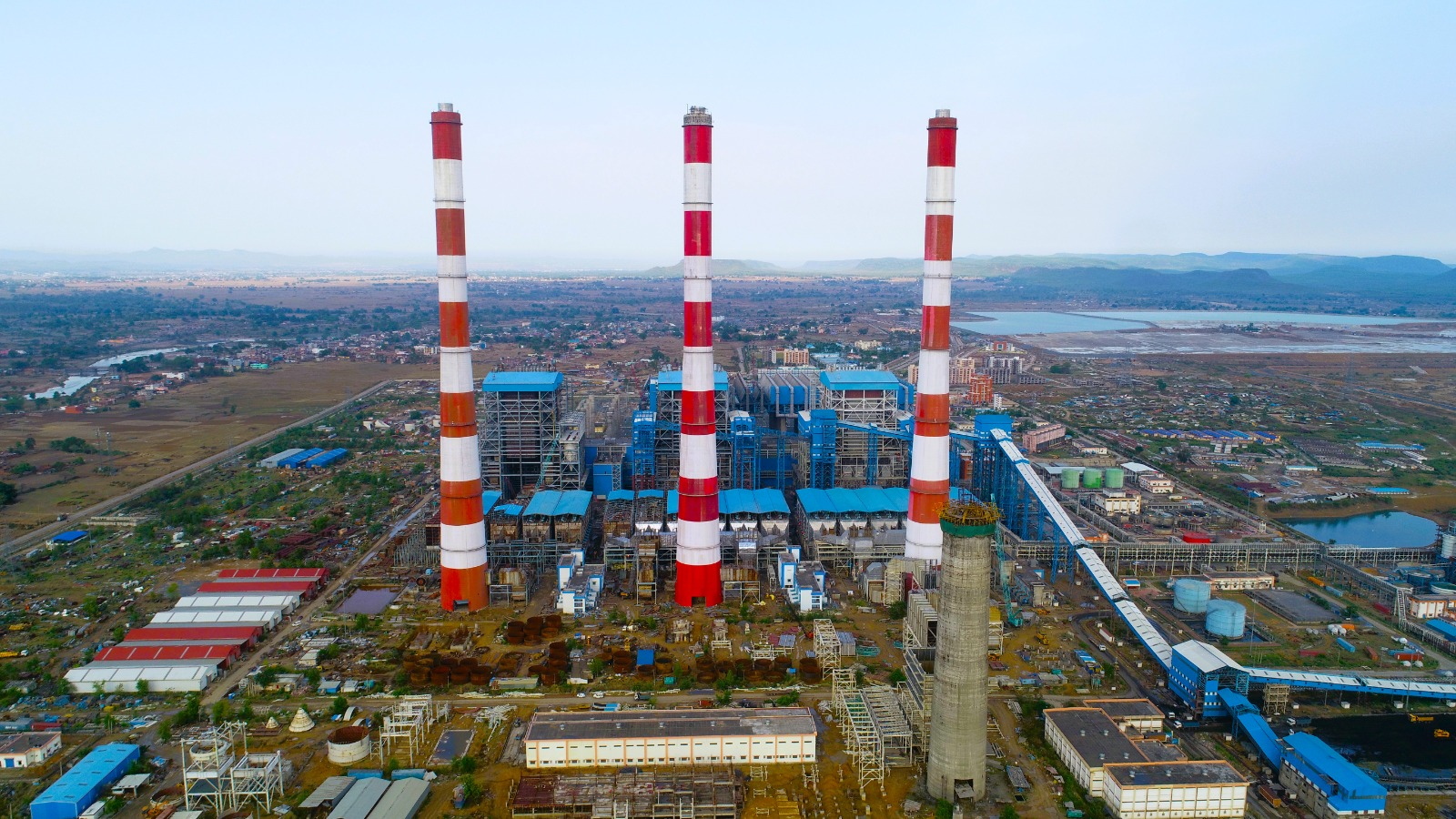
- Location of the North Karanpura Super Thermal Power Station in Jharkhand
- Country: India
- Coordinates: 23°51′02″N 85°00′44″E
- Status: Under Construction
- Commission date: 1 March 2023
- Construction cost: Rs. 14,500 crore
- Owner: NTPC Limited
- Operator: NTPC Limited

Thermal power station
- Primary fuel: Coal

Power generation
- Make and model: BHEL
- Nameplate capacity: 1980 MW

External links
- Website: www.ntpc.co.in

North Karanpura Thermal Power Station is an upcoming coal-based thermal power plant located in Tandwa in the Simaria subdivision of the Chatra district, Jharkhand. The power plant is owned by NTPC Limited.

== Geography ==
Cities, towns and locations in Chatra district in North Chotanagpur Division
M: municipality, CT: census town, R: rural/ urban centre, H: historical/ religious centre, P: power plant, T: tourist centre
Abbreviation used - TPS: thermal power station
Owing to space constraints in the small map, the actual locations in a larger map may vary slightly

=== Location ===
North Karanpura Thermal Power Station is located at 23°51′02″N 85°00′44″E.

Note: The map alongside presents some of the notable locations in the district. All places marked in the map are linked in the larger full screen map.

== Capacity ==
The planned capacity of the power plant is 1980 MW (3x660 MW).

The project was originally proposed in 1999 but got delayed because Coal India Limited objected to the location of the power plant and wanted NTPC to relocate the power plant as it was coming up on site having 6 billion tonnes of coal underneath it. Coal India Limited withdrew the coal linkage to the plant in 2008. The Government of India finally decided in 2013 February against the relocation and in 2013 July, the coal linkage for the plant was restored. The foundation stone was finally laid in August 2014.

Stage	Unit Number	Capacity (MW)	Date of Commissioning	Status
1st	1	660		commissioned
1st	2	660		commissioned
1st	3	660		commissioned

== Progress ==
Efforts are on to get the first unit of the North Karanpura Thermal Power Station ready in 2021. The other two units are expected to be in operation by 2023.
