= Chalkusha (community development block) =

- Community development block
- Location in Jharkhand Chalkusha (India)
- Coordinates: 24.244039°N 85.736392°E
- Country: India
- State: Jharkhand
- District: Hazaribagh

Government
  - Type: Federal democracy

Area
  - Total: 149.10 km^{2} (57.57 sq mi)
- Elevation: 346 m (1,135 ft)

Population (2011)
  - Total: 52,068
  - Density: 349.22/km^{2} (904.46/sq mi)

Languages
  - Official: Hindi, Urdu
- Time zone: UTC+5:30 (IST)
- PIN: 825109 (Palounjia)
- Telephone/ STD code: 06548
- Vehicle registration: JH 02
- Lok Sabha constituency: Kodarma
- Vidhan Sabha constituency: Barkatha
- Website: hazaribag.nic.in

Chalkusha is a community development block (CD block) that forms an administrative division in the Barhi subdivision of the Hazaribagh district in the Indian state of Jharkhand.

== Overview ==
Hazaribagh district is spread over a part of the Chota Nagpur Plateau. The central plateau, averaging a height of 2,000 ft (610 m), occupies the central part of the district. On all sides, except on the western side, it is surrounded by the lower plateau, averaging a height of 1,300 ft (396 m), the surface being undulating. In the north and the north-west the lower plateau forms a fairly level tableland till the ghats, when the height drops to about 700 ft (213 m) and slopes down gradually. The Damodar and the Barakar form the two main watersheds in the district. DVC has constructed the Konar Dam across the Konar River. It is a forested district with cultivation as the main occupation of the people. Coal is the main mineral found in this district. China clay is also found in this district. Inaugurating the Pradhan Mantri Ujjwala Yojana in 2016, Raghubar Das, Chief Minister of Jharkhand, had indicated that there were 23 lakh BPL families in Jharkhand. There was a plan to bring the BPL proportion in the total population down to 35%.

== History ==
Chalkusha Block has been bifurcated from Barkatha Block in 2009, after long struggle of the residents of the Chalkusha, Alagdiha, Choubey, Salaidih, Chatkari, Palma, Baradih and the residents of the areas, they protested on several occasions and in year 2007 a massive protest was organised by the non-political and political groups over 200 people had participated in Ranchi and organized a massive protest in front of the Jharkhand Assembly which were headed by Janki Yadav with former MLA, Chitranjan Prasad Yadav, Jaidev Choudhary and Social activist Birendra Pandey and many other eminent people have fought for the bifurcation of Chalkusha block from Barkatha.

=== Maoist activities ===
Right from its inception in 2000. Jharkhand was a “laboratory” for Naxalites to experiment with their ideas of establishing a parallel government. As of 2005, 16 of the 22 districts in the state, including Hazaribagh district, was transformed into a “guerrilla zone”. The movement was not restricted to armed operations but included kangaroo courts called Jan Adalats, elected village bodies and people's police. Jharkhand, with a dense forest cover over a large part of the state, offers a favourable terrain for the Naxalites to build their bases and operate. Annual fatalities in Jharkhand were 117 in 2003 and 150 in 2004. In 2013 Jharkhand was considered one of the two states in the country most affected by Left wing extremism and Jharkhand police set up an exclusive cell to deal with Maoist activities. However, in the same year, when Jharkhand police identified 13 focus areas for combating Maoist extremism, Hazaribagh district was not one of them.

== Geography ==
Chalkusha is located at 24°14′39″N 85°44′11″E.

Chalkusha CD block is bounded by Markacho CD block, in Koderma district, on the north, Birni and Suriya CD blocks, in Giridih district, on the east, Barkatha CD block on the south and on the west.

Chalkusha CD block has an area of 149.10 km^{2}. As of 2011, Chalkusha CD block had 9 gram panchayats, 36 inhabited villages and no census towns. Barkatha and Gorhar police stations serve this CD block. Headquarters of this CD block is at Chalkusha.

== Demographics ==
=== Population ===
According to the 2011 Census of India, Chalkusa CD block had a total population of 52,068, all of which were rural. There were 26,952 (52%) males and 25,116 (48%) females. Population in the age range 0-6 years was 9,615. Scheduled Castes numbered 7,224 (13.87%) and Scheduled Tribes numbered 784 (1.51%).

Large villages (with 4,000+ population) in Chalkusha CD block are (2011 census figures in brackets): Chalkusha (4,150), Maskedih (4,223), Chaube (6,730).

=== Literacy ===
As of 2011 census, the total number of literates in Chalkusa CD block was 28,499 (67.13% of the population over 6 years) out of which males numbered 17,969 (81.33% of the male population over 6 years) and females numbered 10,530 (51.47% of the female population over 6 years). The gender disparity (the difference between female and male literacy rates) was 29.86%.

As of 2011 census, literacy in Hazaribagh district was 70.48%. Literacy in Jharkhand was 67.63% in 2011. Literacy in India in 2011 was 74.04%.

See also – List of Jharkhand districts ranked by literacy rate

Literacy in CD Blocks of
Hazaribagh district
Barhi subdivision
Chauparan – 69.41%
Barhi – 68.39%
Padma – 68.90%
Barkatha – 61.44%
Chalkusha – 67.13%
Hazaribagh Sadar subdivision
Ichak – 71.87%
Tati Jhariya – 60.68%
Daru – 71.08%
Bishnugarh – 62.04%
Sadar, Hazaribagh – 77.56%
Katkamsandi – 67.38%
Katkamdag – 69.97%
Keredari – 64.04%
Barkagaon – 65.44%
Churchu – 67.97%
Dadi – 70.26%
Source: 2011 Census: CD Block Wise
Primary Census Abstract Data

=== Language and religion ===
Religions in Chalkusha CD block (2011)
Religion	Percent
Hinduism	77.19%
Islam	22.56%
Other or not stated	0.25%

In 2011, 40,191 (77.19%) of the population was Hindu, 11,745 (22.56%) Muslim. Other religions were 132 (0.25%).

Languages of Chalkusha block (2011)
1. Khortha (65.1%)
2. Urdu (12.9%)
3. Hindi (12.7%)
4. Maithili (8.17%)
5. Santali (0.96%)
6. Others (0.25%)

At the time of the 2011 census, 65.09% of the population spoke Khortha, 12.86% Urdu, 12.67% Hindi, 8.17% Maithili and 0.96% Santali as their first language.

== Economy ==
=== Livelihood ===
Livelihood
in Chalkusha CD block
1. Cultivators (48.3%)
2. Agricultural labourers (22.3%)
3. Household industries (4.18%)
4. Other Workers (25.2%)

In Chalkusha CD block in 2011, amongst the class of total workers, cultivators numbered 9,967 and formed 48.34%, agricultural labourers numbered 4,600 and formed 22.31%, household industry workers numbered 861 and formed 4.18% and other workers numbered 5,190 and formed 25.17%. Total workers numbered 20,618 and formed 39.60% of the total population, and non-workers numbered 31,450 and formed 60.40% of the population.

Note: In the census records, a person is considered a cultivator, if the person is engaged in cultivation/ supervision of land owned. When a person who works on another person's land for wages in cash or kind or share, is regarded as an agricultural labourer. Household industry is defined as an industry conducted by one or more members of the family within the household or village, and one that does not qualify for registration as a factory under the Factories Act. Other workers are persons engaged in some economic activity other than cultivators, agricultural labourers and household workers. It includes factory, mining, plantation, transport and office workers, those engaged in business and commerce, teachers, entertainment artistes and so on.

=== Infrastructure ===
There are 36 inhabited villages in Chalkusha CD block. In 2011, 11 villages had power supply. No village had tap water (treated/ untreated), 36 villages had well water (covered/ uncovered), 36 villages had hand pumps, and all villages had drinking water facility. 6 villages had post offices, no village had a sub post office, 2 villages had telephones (land lines) and 10 villages had mobile phone coverage. 36 villages had pucca (hard top) village roads, 7 villages had bus service (public/ private), 7 villages had autos/ modified autos, and 17 villages had tractors. 9 villages had bank branches, 5 villages had agricultural credit societies, 3 villages had cinema/ video halls, 1 village had public library and public reading room. 29 villages had public distribution system, 17 villages had weekly haat (market) and 34 villages had assembly polling stations.

=== Forestry and agriculture ===
The main occupation of the people of Hazaribagh district is cultivation. While forests occupy around 45% of the total area, the cultivable area forms about 39% of the total area. The forests are uniformly spread across the district. Sal is the predominant species in the jungles. Other species are: bamboo, khair, sali, semal, mahua, tamarind, mango, black-berry (jamun), peepal, karnaj, jack-fruit, margosa (neem), kusum, palas, kend, asan, piar and bhelwa. Hazaribag Wildlife Sanctuary is located around 19 km north of Hazaribag. Irrigation facilities in this hilly area are inadequate and generally farmers depend on rain for their cultivation. The land situated along the river banks, or low land, is fertile but the uplands are generally barren. May to October is Kharif season, followed by Rabi season. Rice is the main crop of the district. Other important crops grown are: bazra, maize, pulses (mainly arhar and gram) and oilseeds. Limited quantities of cash crops, such as sugar cane, are grown.

Environmentalist and Advocate at Delhi High Court, Satya Prakash and founder Editor of Legal Boundary, News magazine is resident of Chalkusha, and his efforts to control the illegal mining in the state of Jharkhand, a case was filed at National Green Tribunal. The tribunal set up a committee to check the illegal mining in Hazaribagh and Koderma district of Jharkhand and over 5000 forest cases have been registered after the great efforts of Satya Prakash, and Government of Jharkhand has filed detail report at NGT to curb the illegal mining in forest areas.

=== Backward Regions Grant Fund ===
Hazaribagh district is listed as a backward region and receives financial support from the Backward Regions Grant Fund. The fund, created by the Government of India, is designed to redress regional imbalances in development. As of 2012, 272 districts across the country were listed under this scheme. The list includes 21 districts of Jharkhand.

== Transport ==
Dhanbad-Koderma sector of the Grand chord passes through Chalkusha CD block and there is a station at Chaube.

A road links Chalkusha to the Markacho-Chaube road. There is a bridge across the Barakar. There is a road from Chaube to Keshwari, where it connects to the Suriya-Parasiya road.

== Education ==
In 2011, amongst the 36 inhabited villages in Chalkusha CD block, 5 villages had no primary school, 4 villages had one primary school and 27 villages had more than one primary school. 18 villages had at least one primary school and one middle school. 4 villages had at least one middle school and one secondary school.

== Healthcare ==
In 2011, amongst the 36 inhabited villages in Chalkusha CD block, 4 villages had primary health centres, 7 villages had primary health sub-centres, 1 village had alternative medicine hospital and 29 villages had no medical facilities.
