= Barkatha (community development block) =

- Community development block
- Location in Jharkhand, India Barkatha (India)
- Coordinates: 24.1667°N 85.6167°E
- Country: India
- State: Jharkhand
- District: Hazaribagh

Government
  - Type: Federal democracy

Area
  - Total: 281.05 km^{2} (108.51 sq mi)
- Elevation: 364 m (1,194 ft)

Population (2011)
  - Total: 122,269
  - Density: 435.04/km^{2} (1,126.8/sq mi)

Languages
  - Official: Hindi, Urdu
- Time zone: UTC+5:30 (IST)
- PIN: 825323 (Barkatha)
- Telephone/ STD code: 06548
- Vehicle registration: JH 02
- Lok Sabha constituency: Kodarma
- Vidhan Sabha constituency: Barkatha
- Website: hazaribag.nic.in

Barkatha (also spelled Barakatha) is a community development block (CD block) that forms an administrative division in the Barhi subdivision of the Hazaribagh district in the Indian state of Jharkhand.

== Overview ==
Hazaribagh district is spread over a part of the Chota Nagpur Plateau. The central plateau, averaging a height of 2,000 ft (610 m), occupies the central part of the district. On all sides, except on the western side, it is surrounded by the lower plateau, averaging a height of 1,300 ft (396 m), the surface being undulating. In the north and the north-west the lower plateau forms a fairly level tableland till the ghats, when the height drops to about 700 ft (213 m) and slopes down gradually. The Damodar and the Barakar form the two main watersheds in the district. DVC has constructed the Konar Dam across the Konar River. It is a forested district with cultivation as the main occupation of the people. Coal is the main mineral found in this district. China clay is also found in this district. Inaugurating the Pradhan Mantri Ujjwala Yojana in 2016, Raghubar Das, Chief Minister of Jharkhand, had indicated that there were 23 lakh BPL families in Jharkhand. There was a plan to bring the BPL proportion in the total population down to 35%.

== History ==
Barkatha block was established on 12 July 1955.

=== Maoist activities ===
Right from its inception in 2000. Jharkhand was a “laboratory” for Naxalites to experiment with their ideas of establishing a parallel government. As of 2005, 16 of the 22 districts in the state, including Hazaribagh district, was transformed into a “guerrilla zone”. The movement was not restricted to armed operations but included kangaroo courts called Jan Adalats, elected village bodies and people's police. Jharkhand, with a dense forest cover over a large part of the state, offers a favourable terrain for the Naxalites to build their bases and operate. Annual fatalities in Jharkhand were 117 in 2003 and 150 in 2004. In 2013 Jharkhand was considered one of the two states in the country most affected by Left wing extremism and Jharkhand police set up an exclusive cell to deal with Maoist activities. However, in the same year, when Jharkhand police identified 13 focus areas for combating Maoist extremism, Hazaribagh district was not one of them.

== Geography ==
Barkatha is located at 24.1667°N 85.6167°E.

Barkatha CD block is bounded by Jainagar CD block, in Koderma district, on the north, Bagodar CD block, in Giridih district, and Chalkusha CD block on the east, Bishnugarh and Tati Jhariya CD blocks on the south, and Ichak and Barhi CD blocks on the west.

Barkatha CD block has an area of 281.05 km^{2}. As of 2011, Barkatha CD block had 17 gram panchayats, 81 inhabited villages and no census towns. Barkatha and Gorhar police stations serve this CD block. Headquarters of this CD block is at Barkatha.

It is located 45 km east of Hazaribagh, the district headquarters.

Surajkund hot spring is 5 kilometres (3.1 mi) from Barkatha.

Rs. 286.99 lakhs were released from Mukhyamantri Gram Setu Yoajana in 2013 for the construction of a bridge across the Barsoti River from Madhuban Baghmandwa to Ghangri. As and when constructed, it would provide scope to people living on the other side of the river to access NH 19. Tenders had been floated for the construction of the bridge with a closing date of 14 October 2024.

Gram panchayats under Barkatha intermediate panchayat are as follows: Alagdiha, Barkangango, Barkatha North, Barkatha South, Bedokala, Belkapi, Chalkusha, Chaube, Chechkapi, Chuglamo, Gainda, Gaipahari, Gangpacho, Gorhar, Jhurjhuri, Kapka, Khargu, Konharakhurd, Manaiya, Maskedih, Salaiya, Salaiyadih, Sewatand, Shiladih, Sudan, and Tuiyo.

== Demographics ==
=== Population ===
According to the 2011 Census of India, Barkatha CD block had a total population of 122,269, all of which were rural. There were 62,849 (51%) males and 59,420 (49%) females. Population in the age range 0–6 years was 22,324. Scheduled Castes numbered 15,761 (12.89%) and Scheduled Tribes numbered 7,451 (6.09%).

In 2001 census, Barkatha CD block had a population of 125, 868, out of which 59, 114 were males and 66, 754 were females. 16,419 belonged to scheduled castes and 6,379 belonged to scheduled tribes. 37, 487 persons were literate.

Large villages (with 4,000+ population) in Barkatha CD block are (2011 census figures in brackets): Barkatha (8,364), Gorhar (6,734), Bero Kalan alias Bero (5,198), Kapka (4,801), Jhurjhuri (4,298) and Belkapi (7,979).

Other villages in Barkatha CD block include (2011 census figures in brackets): Kawalu (562), Siladih (2,572), Dodhara (719), Laganwa (1,036), Banwari (1,359), Lemua (509) and Surujkhurd (229).

=== Literacy ===
As of 2011 census, the total number of literate persons in Barkatha CD block was 61,405 (61.44% of the population over 6 years) out of which males numbered 39,207 (76.33% of the male population over 6 years) and females numbered 22,198 (57.54% of the female population over 6 years). The gender disparity (the difference between female and male literacy rates) was 18.79%.

As of 2011 census, literacy in Hazaribagh district was 70.48%. Literacy in Jharkhand was 67.63% in 2011. Literacy in India in 2011 was 74.04%.

See also – List of Jharkhand districts ranked by literacy rate

Literacy in CD Blocks of
Hazaribagh district
Barhi subdivision
Chauparan – 69.41%
Barhi – 68.39%
Padma – 68.90%
Barkatha – 61.44%
Chalkusha – 67.13%
Hazaribagh Sadar subdivision
Ichak – 71.87%
Tati Jhariya – 60.68%
Daru – 71.08%
Bishnugarh – 62.04%
Sadar, Hazaribagh – 77.56%
Katkamsandi – 67.38%
Katkamdag – 69.97%
Keredari – 64.04%
Barkagaon – 65.44%
Churchu – 67.97%
Dadi – 70.26%
Source: 2011 Census: CD Block Wise
Primary Census Abstract Data

=== Language and religion ===
Religions in Barkatha CD block (2011)
Religion	Percent
Hinduism	85.89%
Islam	12.77%
Sarna	1.01%
Other or not stated	0.33%

In 2011, 105,021 (85.89%) of the population was Hindu, 15,610 (12.77%) Muslim. Other religions were 1,638 (1.34%).

Languages of Barkatha CD block (2011)
1. Khortha (87.8%)
2. Santali (5.63%)
3. Hindi (4.04%)
4. Urdu (2.31%)
5. Others (0.20%)

At the time of the 2011 census, 87.82% of the population spoke Khortha, 5.63% Santali, 4.04% Hindi and 2.31% Urdu as their first language.

== Rural poverty ==
40-50% of the population of Hazaribagh district were in the BPL category in 2004–2005, being in the same category as Godda, Giridih and Koderma districts. Rural poverty in Jharkhand declined from 66% in 1993–94 to 46% in 2004–05. In 2011, it has come down to 39.1%.

== Economy ==
=== Livelihood ===
Livelihood
in Barkatha CD block
1. Cultivators (52.5%)
2. Agricultural labourers (25.6%)
3. Household industries (2.13%)
4. Other Workers (19.8%)

In Barkatha CD block in 2011, amongst the class of total workers, cultivators numbered 24,716 and formed 52.45%, agricultural labourers numbered 12,066 and formed 25.61%, household industry workers numbered 1,002 and formed 2.13% and other workers numbered 9,338 and formed 19.82%. Total workers numbered 47,122 and formed 38.54% of the total population, and non-workers numbered 75,147 and formed 61.46% of the population.

Note: In the census records, a person is considered a cultivator, if the person is engaged in cultivation/ supervision of land owned. When a person who works on another person's land for wages in cash or kind or share, is regarded as an agricultural labourer. Household industry is defined as an industry conducted by one or more members of the family within the household or village, and one that does not qualify for registration as a factory under the Factories Act. Other workers are persons engaged in some economic activity other than cultivators, agricultural labourers and household workers. It includes factory, mining, plantation, transport and office workers, those engaged in business and commerce, teachers, entertainment artistes and so on.

=== Infrastructure ===
There are 81 inhabited villages in Barkatha CD block. In 2011, 47 villages had power supply. No village had tap water (treated/ untreated), 71 villages had well water (covered/ uncovered), 80 villages had hand pumps, and all villages had drinking water facility. 14 villages had post offices, 7 villages had sub post offices, 22 villages had telephones (land lines) and 55 villages had mobile phone coverage. 81 villages had pucca (hard top) village roads, 11 villages had bus service (public/ private), 2 villages had autos/ modified autos, and 24 villages had tractors. 8 villages had bank branches, 12 villages had agricultural credit societies, no village had cinema/ video hall, no village had public library and public reading room. 39 villages had public distribution system, 6 villages had weekly haat (market) and 49 villages had assembly polling stations.

=== Forestry and agriculture ===
The main occupation of the people of Hazaribagh district is cultivation. While forests occupy around 45% of the total area, the cultivable area forms about 39% of the total area. The forests are uniformly spread across the district. Sal is the predominant species in the jungles. Other species are: bamboo, khair, sali, semal, mahua, tamarind, mango, blackberry (jamun), peepal, karnaj, jack-fruit, margosa (neem), kusum, palas, kend, asan, piar and bhelwa. Hazaribag Wildlife Sanctuary is located around 19 km north of Hazaribag. Irrigation facilities in this hilly area are inadequate and generally farmers depend on rain for their cultivation. The land situated along the river banks, or low land, is fertile but the uplands are generally barren. May to October is Kharif season, followed by Rabi season. Rice is the main crop of the district. Other important crops grown are: bazra, maize, pulses (mainly arhar and gram) and oilseeds. Limited quantities of cash crops, such as sugar cane, are grown.

=== Backward Regions Grant Fund ===
Hazaribagh district is listed as a backward region and receives financial support from the Backward Regions Grant Fund. The fund, created by the Government of India, is designed to redress regional imbalances in development. As of 2012, 272 districts across the country were listed under this scheme. The list includes 21 districts of Jharkhand.

== Transport ==
Delhi-Kolkata Road, National Highway 19 (old NH 2) / Grand Trunk Road passes through Barkatha CD block.

== Education ==
In 2011, amongst the 81 inhabited villages in Barkatha CD block, 7 villages had no primary school, 56 villages had one primary school and 18 villages had more than one primary school. 46 villages had at least one primary school and one middle school. 11 villages had at least one middle school and one secondary school.

== Healthcare ==
In 2011, amongst the 81 inhabited villages in Barkatha CD block, 1 village had community health centre, 1 village had primary health centre, 6 villages had primary health sub-centres, 2 villages had maternity and child welfare centres, 13 villages had alternative medicine hospitals, 5 villages had dispensaries, 1 village had veterinary hospital, 8 villages had medicine shops and 54 villages had no medical facilities.
