= Nawadih (disambiguation) =

Nawadih refers to a village in Bokaro district, Jharkhand, India

Nawadih also refers to:

- Nawadih Satgawan, a village in Koderma district, Jharkhand, India
- Nawadih, Markacho, a village in Koderma district, Jharkhand, India
- Nawadih block, in Bokaro district, Jharkhand, India
- Nawadih Airfield, in Gaya district, Bihar, India
