= Singhrawan =

- Village
- Location in Jharkhand
- Coordinates: 24.3408°N 85.3581°E
- Country: India
- State: Jharkhand
- District: Hazaribagh
- Sub-district: Chauparan

Area
  - Total: 555.95 ha (1,373.8 acres)

Population (2011)
  - Total: 3,633
  - Male: 1,820
  - Female: 1,813
- Pincode: 825406

Singhrawan is a village in the Chauparan sub-district in the Hazaribagh district of Jharkhand state in India.

== Banks ==
A branch of the State Bank of India in Singhrawan has an ATM providing a 24-hour facility.

== Transport ==
=== Road ===
Singhrawan is on National Highway 2 between Kolkata and New Delhi, and close to the National Highway 31 from Patna to Ranchi.

=== Railway ===
The nearest railway station is 7 kilometres (4.3 mi) away at Barhi; Koderma Junction on the Howrah–Delhi main line is 37 kilometres (23 mi) away.

== Education ==
Schools in Singhrawan include the Sundar Lal Jain High School, affiliated to the Jharkhand Academic Council, the Vector Public School, the Government Middle School and Pushkar Public School. The nearest schools to Singhrawan affiliated to the CBSE are in Chauparan and Barhi.
