= Manoj Kumar Yadav (Jharkhand politician) =

Indian politician from Hazaribagh, Jharkhand

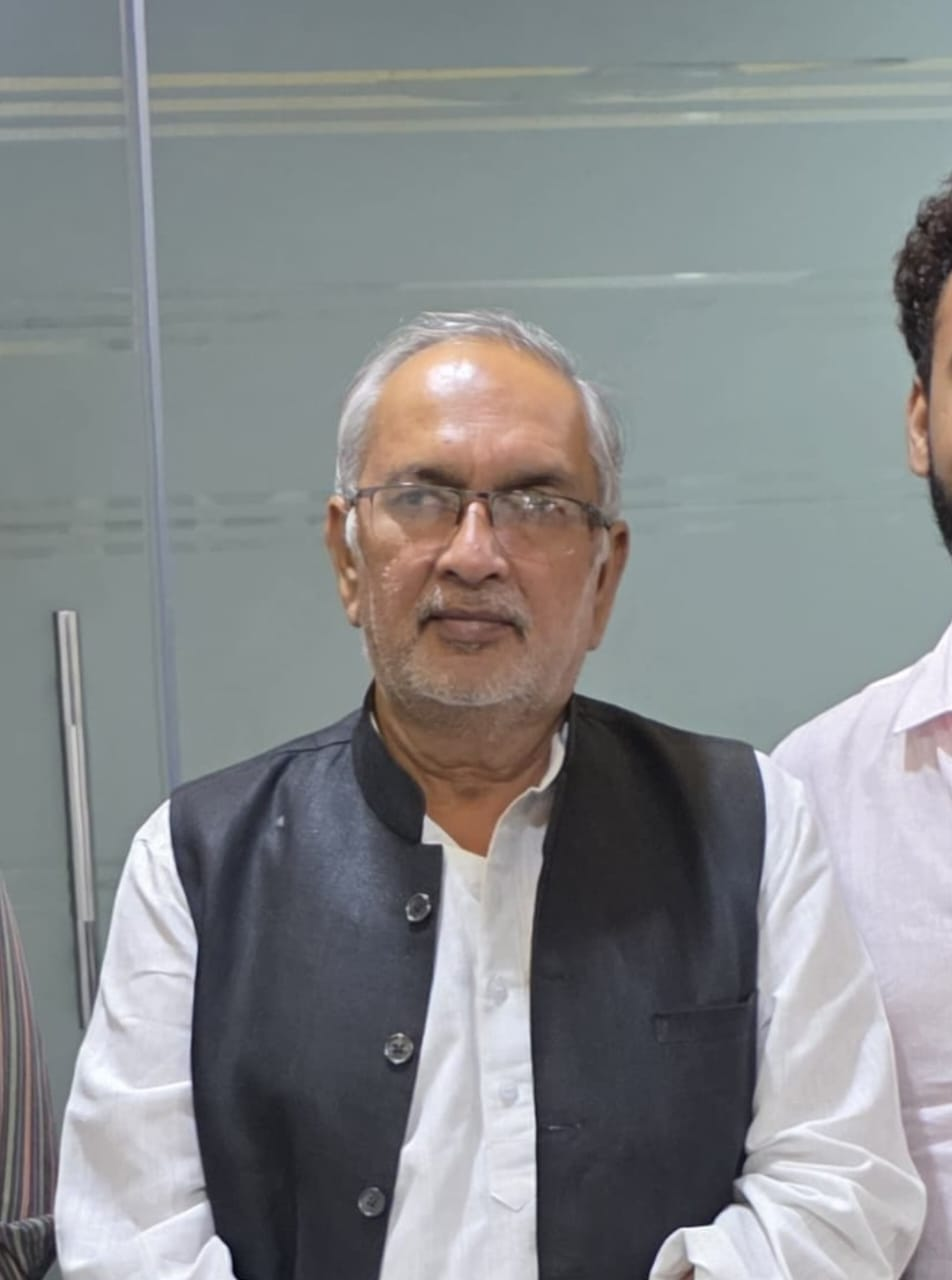

Member (MLA) of Jharkhand Legislative Assembly
- Incumbent
- Assumed office 23 November 2024
- Preceded by: Umashankar Akela
- Constituency: Barhi

Personal details
- Born: 22 December 1956 (age 69)
- Party: BJP (2018-Present)
- Other political affiliations: INC (1995-2018)
- Parent: Ram Narayan Yadav (father)
- Education: Ranchi University
- Profession: Politician

Manoj Kumar Yadav (born 22 December 1956) is an Indian politician from Hazaribagh district, Jharkhand. He is presently the Member of the Legislative Assembly (MLA) from Barhi assembly constituency as a Bharatiya Janata Party (BJP) member. He is the Chairman of Jharkhand's Public Accounts Committee (PAC) since January 2025.

== Early life and education ==
Manoj Kumar Yadav was born on 22 December 1956 in Jharkhand. He did B.Sc. from Ram Lakhan Singh Yadav College affiliated with the Ranchi University in 1975.

== About ==
Between 1995 and 2014, Manoj Yadav has been elected four times from Barhi seat as MLA on Indian National Congress (INC) symbol. He was the senior-most politician in party but left the Congress and joined Bharatiya Janata Party (BJP) in 2018.

Manoj Yadav unsuccessfully contested from Barhi in 5th Jharkhand Assembly election on BJP symbol. In 2024, he was elected once again as MLA from Barhi and became a member of the 6th Jharkhand Assembly.

== Positions held ==
Manoj Kumar Yadav has served 5 times as MLA. He also unsuccessfully contested the Lok Sabha elections from Chatra constituency in 2019.

From	To	Position	Constituency
1995	2000	MLA in the 11th Bihar Assembly	Barhi
2000	2005	MLA in the 1st Jharkhand Assembly	Barhi
2005	2009	MLA in the 2nd Jharkhand Assembly	Barhi
2014	2019	MLA in the 4th Jharkhand Assembly	Barhi
2024	Incumbent	MLA in the 6th Jharkhand Assembly	Barhi

== See also ==
- Jharkhand Legislative Assembly
- Bharatiya Janata Party
- Barhi, Hazaribagh
- Manish Jaiswal
