= Surajkund hot spring =

Thermal spring

Surajkund Hot Spring
- Location within Jharkhand
- Location: Hazaribagh district, Jharkhand, India
- Coordinates: 24.14945°N 85.64545°E
- Elevation: 364 metres (1,194 ft)
- Type: Sulfur
- Temperature: Surface temp: 85 °C (185 °F); Av sub-surface temp:165 °C (329 °F)

Surajkund hot spring (also called Surya Kund) is a natural hot spring in Belkapi gram panchayat of Barkatha CD block in Barhi subdivision of Hazaribagh district in the Indian state of Jharkhand.

== Geography ==
Cities, towns and locations in Hazaribagh district in North Chotanagpur Division
Some census towns and locations around Hazaribagh city have been shown in the Hazaribagh City map
M: municipality, CT: census town, R: rural/ urban centre, T: tourist centre, D: dam, HS: hot spring
Owing to space constraints in the small map, the actual locations in a larger map may vary slightly

=== Location ===
Surajkund is located at 24.14945°N 85.64545°E.

=== Area overview ===
Hazaribagh district is a plateau area and forests occupy around about 45% of the total area. It is a predominantly rural area with 92.34% of the population living in rural areas against 7.66% in the urban areas. There are many census towns in the district, as can be seen in the map alongside. Agriculture is the main occupation of the people but with the extension of coal mines, particularly in the southern part of the district, employment in coal mines is increasing. However, it has to be borne in mind that modern mining operations are highly mechanised. Four operational areas of Central Coalfields are marked on the map. All these areas are spread across partly this district and partly the neighbouring districts.

== Hot spring ==
Surajkund has a hot water spring containing sulfur that allegedly has healing properties. Tourism department of Jharkhand Government has planned to set up spas, saunas, massage parlours, restaurants and convention halls here,

Surajkund hot spring is claimed to be the hottest spring in India. Surajkund hot spring has a surface temperature of 87 °C (189 °F) and an average subsurface temperature of 165 °C (329 °F). According to recent assessment, India has a large potential of geothermal energy, which can be gainfully utilized for power generation; Jharkhand possesses a good share of these. Of the total recorded sites numbering 340 in India (assessed by Geothermal Education office - US), around 60 sites are in Jharkhand. Surajkund is among the most prospective sites. Other prospective sites in Jharkhand are: Tantolaya / Tantlol, in Santhal Paragana division, and Thatha / Konraha and Jarom in Palamu district.

There are five kunds or springs, namely Surya Kund, Lakshman Kund, Brahm Kund, Ram Kund, and Sita Kund. These are located in one place with water varying from very hot to cool. A Durga temple has been constructed in more recent years.

== Transport ==
Surajkund is 72 kilometres (45 mi) from Hazaribagh and 5 kilometres (3.1 mi) from Barkatha on NH 19 (old NH 2) (Grand Trunk Road).
