= Nagar Barsot =

- Village
- Location in Jharkhand, India Nagar Barsot (India)
- Coordinates: 24.2437°N 85.4963°E
- Country: India
- State: Jharkhand
- District: Hazaribagh

Population (2011)
  - Total: 5,974

Languages (*For language details see Barhi (community development block)#Language and religion)
  - Official: Hindi, Urdu
- Time zone: UTC+5:30 (IST)
- Telephone/ STD code: 06545
- Vehicle registration: JH 02
- Website: hazaribag.nic.in

Nagar Barsot (also called Barsot) is a village in the Barhi CD block in the Barhi subdivision of the Hazaribagh district in the Indian state of Jharkhand.

== Geography ==
Cities, towns and locations in Hazaribagh district in North Chotanagpur Division
Some census towns and locations around Hazaribagh city have been shown in the Hazaribagh City map
M: municipality, CT: census town, R: rural/ urban centre, T: tourist centre, D: dam, HS: hot spring
Owing to space constraints in the small map, the actual locations in a larger map may vary slightly

=== Location ===
Nagar Barsot is located at 24.2437°N 85.4963°E.

=== Area overview ===
Hazaribagh district is a plateau area and forests occupy around 45% of the total area. It is a predominantly rural area with 92.34% of the population living in rural areas against 7.66% in the urban areas. There are many census towns in the district, as can be seen in the map alongside. Agriculture is the main occupation of the people but with the extension of coal mines, particularly in the southern part of the district, employment in coal mines is increasing. However, it has to be borne in mind that modern mining operations are highly mechanised. Four operational areas of Central Coalfields are marked on the map. All these areas are spread across partly this district and partly the neighbouring districts.

Note: The map alongside presents some of the notable locations in the district. All places marked in the map are linked in the larger full screen map. Urbanisation data calculated on the basis of census data for CD blocks and may vary a little against unpublished official data.

== Demographics ==
According to the 2011 Census of India, Nagar Barsot had a total population of 5,974, of which 3,082 (52%) were males and 2,892 (48%) were females. Population in the age range 0-6 years was 969. The total number of literate persons in Nagar Barsot was 3,419 (75.45% of the population over 6 years).

== Transport ==
Nagar Barsot is located on National Highway 19 (old NH 2) / Grand Trunk Road.

== Education ==
Kasturba Gandhi Balika Vidyalaya was established at Barsot in 2006. It offers arts and commerce courses in classes XI and XII. No fees are payable.

The Kasturba Gandhi Balika Vidyalaya scheme was launched in 2004 by the Government of India for setting up of upper primary level residential schools for girls belonging to Scheduled Castes, Scheduled Tribes, Other Backward Classes, minority communities and families below the poverty line in educationally backward blocks where rural female literacy was low and the gender gap in literacy was high.
