= Umashankar Akela =

Indian politician

- Umashankar ji

Member of Jharkhand Legislative Assembly
- In office 2019–2024
- Preceded by: Manoj Yadav
- Constituency: Barhi

Member of Jharkhand Legislative Assembly
- In office 2009–2014
- Preceded by: Manoj Yadav
- Succeeded by: Manoj Yadav
- Constituency: Barhi

Personal details
- Born: Umashankar Akela Village-Chhapra, Post-Chhaprra, P.S.-Chhapra, District-Chhapra, Bihar
- Party: Bharatiya Janata Party(before-2019); Indian National Congress(2019-till)
- Other political affiliations: samajwadi party (october 2024-till)
- Education: Educated
- Profession: Politician social worker

Umashankar Akela or Umashankar Yadav was an Indian politician and elected from Barhi constituency as a member of Bharatiya Janata Party as well as Indian National Congress in 2009 and 2019.
