= Chaube, Hazaribagh =

Chaube
- Village
- Location in Jharkhand, India Chaube (India)
- Coordinates: 24.237039°N 85.816392°E
- Country: India
- State: Jharkhand
- District: Hazaribagh

Population (2011)
  - Total: 6,730

Languages (*For language details see Chalkusa (community development block)#Language and religion)
  - Official: Hindi, Urdu
- Time zone: UTC+5:30 (IST)
- PIN: 825109 (Palounjia)
- Telephone/ STD code: 06548
- Vehicle registration: JH 02
- Website: hazaribag.nic.in

Chaube is a village in the Chalkusha CD block in the Barhi subdivision of the Hazaribagh district in the Indian state of Jharkhand.

== Demographics ==
According to the 2011 Census of India, Chaube had a total population of 6,730, of which 3,528 (52%) were males and 3,202 (48%) were females. Population in the age range 0-6 years was 1,233. The total number of literate persons in Chaube was 3,814 (69.38% of the population over 6 years).

== Transport ==
Chaube has a railway station in the Dhanbad-Koderma sector of the Grand chord.

Chaube is linked to Markacho through the Markacho-Chaube road and to Keshwari through the Chaube-Keshwari road.
