= Markacho =

- Village
- Location in Jharkhand, India Markacho (India)
- Coordinates: 24.327222°N 85.834444°E
- Country: India
- State: Jharkhand
- District: Koderma

Population (2011)
  - Total: 14,298

Languages (*For language details see Markacho (community development block)#Language and religion)
  - Official: Hindi, Urdu
- Time zone: UTC+5:30 (IST)
- PIN: 825318
- Telephone/ STD code: 06534
- Vehicle registration: JH 12
- Lok Sabha constituency: Kodarma
- Vidhan Sabha constituency: Kodarma
- Website: koderma.nic.in

Markacho is a village and gram panchayat in the Markacho CD block in the Koderma subdivision of the Koderma district in the Indian state of Jharkhand.

== Geography ==
Cities, towns and locations in Koderma district in North Chotanagpur Division
M: municipality, CT: census town, R: rural/ urban centre, D: dam, P: power plant, T: tourist centre
Owing to space constraints in the small map, the actual locations in a larger map may vary slightly

=== Location ===
Markacho is located at 24.327222°N 85.834444°E.

=== Overview ===
Koderma district is plateau territory and around 60% of the total area is covered with forests. The first dam of the Damodar Valley Corporation, at Tilaiya, was built across the Barakar River and inaugurated in 1953. Koderma Junction railway station has emerged as an important railway centre in the region. It is a predominantly rural district with only 19.72% urban population.

Note: The map alongside presents some of the notable locations in the district. All places marked in the map are linked in the larger full screen map.

== Demographics ==
According to the 2011 Census of India, Markacho had a total population of 14,298, of which 7,221 (51%) were males and 7,077 (49%) were females. Population in the age range 0–6 years was 2,585. The total number of literate persons in Markacho was 8,537 (72.88% of the population over 6 years).

== Civic administration ==
=== Police station ===
Markacho police station serves Markacho CD block.

=== CD block HQ ===
Headquarters of Markacho CD block is at Markacho village.

== Transport ==
There is a station nearby at Nawadih on the Madhupur-Giridih-Koderma line.
