= Itkhori =

- Village
- Location in Jharkhand, India Itkhori (India)
- Coordinates: 24.298744°N 85.162432°E
- Country: India
- State: Jharkhand
- District: Chatra

Population (2011)
  - Total: 7,121

Languages (*For language details see Itkhori block#Language and religion)
  - Official: Hindi, Urdu
- Time zone: UTC+5:30 (IST)
- PIN: 825408
- Telephone/ STD code: 06547
- Vehicle registration: JH 13
- Lok Sabha constituency: Chatra
- [[Simaria (Vidhan Sabha) Assembly constituency: [[(Vidhan Sabha constituency)|]]
- Website: chatra.nic.in

Itkhori is a village and gram panchayat in the Itkhori CD block in the Chatra subdivision of the Chatra district in the Indian state of Jharkhand.

== Geography ==
Cities, towns and locations in Chatra district in North Chotanagpur Division
M: municipality, CT: census town, R: rural/ urban centre, H: historical/ religious centre, P: power plant, T: tourist centre
Abbreviation used - TPS: thermal power station
Owing to space constraints in the small map, the actual locations in a larger map may vary slightly

=== Location ===
Itkhori is located at 24.298744°N 85.162432°E. It is 35 km from Chatra and 16 km from Chauparan on National Highway 19 (old number NH2/ Grand Trunk Road).

=== Area overview ===
The map alongside shows that the forests (mark the light shading), covering around 60% of Chatra district, are evenly spread across the district. It is a plateau area with an elevation of about 450 metres (1,476 ft) above mean sea level. Efforts are on to get the first unit of the NTPC Limited’s North Karanpura Thermal Power Station (3x660 MW), ready in 2021.North Karanpura Coalfield of Central Coalfields Limited, spread over 1,230 square kilometres (470 sq mi) in the southern part of the district, with spill over to neighbouring districts, and having coal reserves of 14 billion tonnes is among the biggest in India. The map provides links to three CCL operational areas.

Note: The map alongside presents some of the notable locations in the district. All places marked in the map are linked in the larger full screen map.

== Demographics ==
According to the 2011 Census of India, Itkhori (location code 349000) had a total population of 7,121, of which 3,568 (50%) were males and 3,553 (50%) were females. Population in the age range 0–6 years was 1,141. The total number of literate persons in Itkhori was 4,742 (79.30% of the population over 6 years).

== Civic administration ==
=== Police station ===
Itkhori police station serves Itkhori CD block.

=== CD block HQ ===
Headquarters of Itkhori CD block is at Itkhori village.

== Education ==
Bhadrakali College was established at Itkhori in 1979. Affiliated with the Vinoba Bhave University it offers courses in arts, science and commerce streams.

== Culture ==
Gautama Buddha once stayed here for some time. His maternal aunt failed to disturb him in his meditation. She left the place with the comment "Iti khoi" which in Pali means "I lost him here". Later, the place came to be known as Itkhori. There are various Buddhist relics at Itkhori dating from 200 BC to 1200 AD. There is a ‘stupa’ like structure with 104 Bodhisattvas and four principal Buddhas sculpted on each side. Buddhist and Jain monks from different countries visit Itkhori round the year.

Itkhori has the footprint of the 10th Jain tirthankara, Shitalanatha. Plans are afoot for a Jain temple at Itkhori.

The Ma Bhadrakali temple, built in the 9th century, has several ancient deities that includes the Hindu deity Bhadrakali and the Buddhist deity Tara. Itkhori Mahotsav is organised annually in February.

It is believed that Siddhārtha Gautama travelled from Itkhori to Bodh Gaya where he attained enlightenment. Numerous Buddhist and Hindu sculptures have been unearthed at a village called Bihari, near Itkhori. It is also near Kauleshwari Temple. Many other sculptures have been found while digging wells etc. in the region. There are some valuable sculptures in the Bhadrakali Mandir Museum.
