= Amit Kumar Yadav =

Indian politician

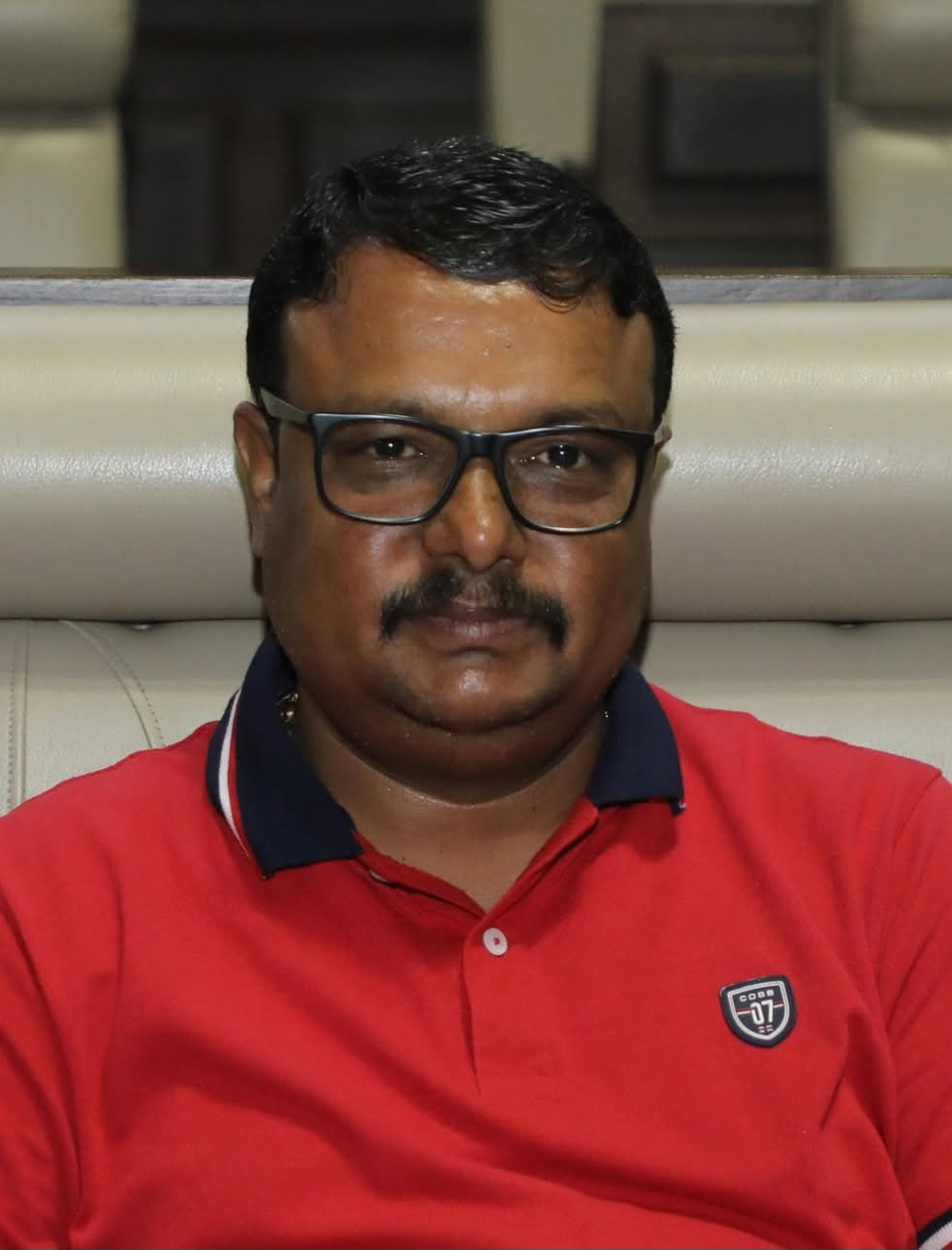
- Yadav in 2025

Member of the Jharkhand Legislative Assembly
- Incumbent
- Assumed office 2019
- Preceded by: Janki Prasad Yadav
- Constituency: Barkatha
- In office 2009–2014
- Preceded by: Chitranjan Yadav
- Succeeded by: Janki Prasad Yadav
- Constituency: Barkatha

Personal details
- Born: Village – Chatkari, P.O.- Chalkusha, Ps. Barkhatha Distt-Hazaribagh
- Party: Bharatiya Janata Party (since 2024) (Before-2019)
- Relatives: Chitranjan Yadav (Father)
- Profession: Politician social worker

Amit Kumar Yadav is an Indian politician. He was elected to the Jharkhand Legislative Assembly from Barkatha in the 2009 election as a member of the Bharatiya Janata Party. In 2019 Yadav contested as an independent candidate from this constituency and won. His father Chitranjan Yadav also served this constituency from 2005 to 2009.
