= Barhi, Hazaribagh =

Barhi
- Census Town
- Location in Jharkhand, India Barhi (India)
- Coordinates: 24.3°N 85.42°E
- Country: India
- State: Jharkhand
- District: Hazaribagh
- Elevation: 374 m (1,227 ft)

Population (2011)
  - Total: 11,867

Languages
  - Official: Hindi, Urdu
- Time zone: UTC+5:30 (IST)
- PIN: 825405
- Vehicle registration: JH
- Lok Sabha constituency: Hazaribagh
- Vidhan Sabha constituency: Barhi
- Website: hazaribag.nic.in

Barhi is a census town and headquarters of the Barhi CD block and the Barhi subdivision of the Hazaribagh district in the state of Jharkhand, India. It stands at the crossing of NH 19 (old number NH 2)/ Grand Trunk Road and NH 20.The Sub-Divisional Officer of Barhi is Hon'ble Shri. Johan Tudu.

All major buses on the Ranchi-Patna, Ranchi-Gaya, Barhi-Ranchi, Dhanbad-Patna and Dhanbad-Gaya routes pass through Barhi. Both Tilaiya Dam of DVC and Hazaribagh Wildlife Sanctuary are near Barhi.

== History ==
Barhi was once a subdivisional town (up to 1872). There is a small cemetery on Grand Trunk Road, with a grave of Col Knyvett, Commander of Grand Trunk Road. He died in 1857.

Basudev Katriar was the first chief of Barhi. The Katriar family started the durga puja tradition in Barhi in 1906. The Katriar family were the erstwhile Zamindars of Barhi and Diwan Of Ramgarh Raj. They belonged to the chitraguptavanshi kayastha community.

The Katriar family has produced several notable public figures including Radha Govind Prasad, who served as a Member of Bihar Legislative Council (MLC), Deputy finance minister in the Government of Bihar (1957-1961) and Chairman of Bihar Legislative Council in 1962.

== Civic administration ==
=== Police station ===
Barhi police station serves the Barhi CD block.

=== CD block HQ ===
The headquarters of Barhi CD block are located at Barhi.

== Demographics ==
According to the 2011 Census of India, Barhi had a total population of 11,867, of which 6,107 (51%) were males and 5,560 (49%) were females. Population in the age range 0–6 years was 1,755. The total number of literate persons in Barhi was 8,140 (80.50% of the population over 6 years).

As of 2001 India census, Barhi had a population of 9,933. Males constitute 53% of the population and females 47%. Barhi has an average literacy rate of 60%, higher than the national average of 59.5%; with 62% of the males and 38% of females literate. 18% of the population is under 6 years of age.

== Geography ==
Cities, Towns and locations in Hazaribagh district in North Chotanagpur Division
Some census towns and locations around Hazaribagh city have been shown in the Hazaribagh City map
M: municipality, CT: census town, R: rural/ urban centre, T: tourist centre, D: dam, HS: hot spring
Owing to space constraints in the small map, the actual locations in a larger map may vary slightly

=== Location ===
Barhi is located at 24.3°N 85.42°E. It has an average elevation of 374 metres (1227 feet). The Barakar River lies 3 kilometres (1.9 mi) from Barhi. Hazaribag National Park is 18 kilometres (11 mi) away from Barhi. Tilaiya Dam is 17 kilometres (11 mi) away.

=== Area overview ===
Hazaribagh district is a plateau area and forests occupy around about 45% of the total area. It is a predominantly rural area with 92.34% of the population living in rural areas against 7.66% in the urban areas. There are many census towns in the district, as can be seen in the map alongside. Agriculture is the main occupation of the people but with the extension of coal mines, particularly in the southern part of the district, employment in coal mines is increasing. However, it has to be borne in mind that modern mining operations are highly mechanised. Four operational areas of Central Coalfields are marked on the map. All these areas are spread across partly this district and partly the neighbouring districts.

Note: The map alongside presents some of the notable locations in the district. All places marked in the map are linked in the larger full screen map. Urbanisation data calculated on the basis of census data for CD blocks and may vary a little against unpublished official data.

== Infrastructure ==
According to the District Census Handbook 2011, Hazaribagh, Barhi covered an area of 3.67 km^{2}. Among the civic amenities, it had 8 km roads with open drains, the protected water supply involved hand pumps, uncovered wells. It had 5000 domestic electric connections, 200 road light points. Among the educational facilities it had 12 primary schools, 4 middle schools, 5 secondary school, 2 senior secondary school. It had 1 non-formal education centre (Sarva Shiksha Abhiyan). Among the social, recreational and cultural facilities it had 1 cinema theatre, 1 auditorium/ community hall. Two important communities it manufactured were furniture and shoes. It had the branch offices of 6 nationalised banks, 1 cooperative bank, 1 agricultural credit society.

== Education ==
=== College ===
- Ram Narayan Yadav Memorial College
- Degree College, Barhi

=== Schools ===
- Model school barhi
- Aryabhatt Public School
- Royal Orchid International School
- Indian public school
- Delhi Public School
- DAV public school
- Bhamashah Saraswati Shishu Vidya Mandir
- Boy's middle school
- Ilex public school
- S.D.G.M. Academy, konra
- ST'S Vinovabhave Public
- Little Champ Play School
- +2 High School
- Girl's Middle School
- Little Moon Play School
- Nexgan Kids Play School

== Transportation ==
- Railway

The 79.7 km long first stage railway project from Koderma to Hazaribagh costing ₹ 936 crores was inaugurated by Prime Minister Narendra Modi on 20 February 2015. The railway line passes through the Barhi CD block and there is a station at Barhi.

- Roadways

- Barhi is connected with New Delhi and Kolkata by NH-19 highway and major cities like Ranchi and Patna.

- An international road, Asian Highway 42 (AH42) starts from Barhi to Lanzhou, China connecting India, Nepal & China. It is the nearest Asian Highway to Mount Everest.

== Healthcare ==
Barhi Subdivisional Hospital has 10 beds.
