= Barhi Assembly constituency =

Constituency of the Jharkhand legislative assembly in India

Coordinates: 24.3°N 85.42°E

Barhi
- Constituency No. 21 for the Jharkhand Legislative Assembly

Constituency details
- Country: India
- Region: East India
- State: Jharkhand
- Lok Sabha constituency: Hazaribagh
- Established: 2000
- Reservation: None

Member of Legislative Assembly
- 5th Jharkhand Legislative Assembly
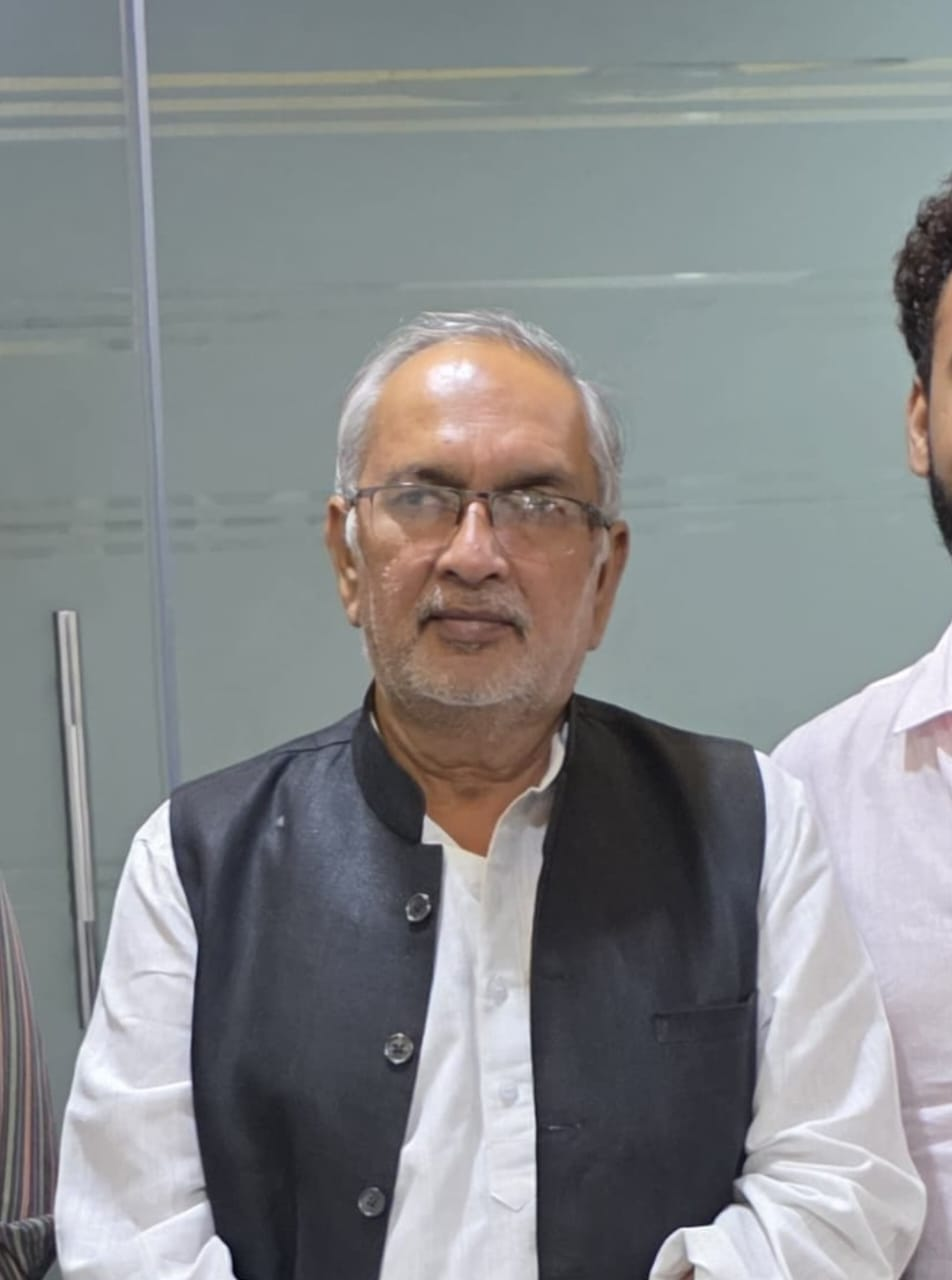
- Incumbent Manoj Yadav
- Party: BJP
- Elected year: 2024

Barhi Assembly constituency is an assembly constituency in the Indian state of Jharkhand.

== Overview ==
Barhi police station in Hazaribagh district and Chauparan police station in Hazaribagh district.

Barhi assembly constituency is part of Hazaribagh (Lok Sabha constituency). There are four blocks under the jurisdiction of Barhi Assembly constituency- Barhi, Chauparan, Padma in Hazaribagh district and Chandwara in Koderma district. Two new administrative blocks (Padma and Chandwara) were created during the 1990s when Ram Lakhan Singh was the MLA of the constituency. The constituency covers 64 panchyats under these four blocks- Barhi (20 panchayats), Chauparan (26 panchayats), Padma (8 Panchayats) and Chadwara (10 panchayats). Entire Barhi constituency is divided into 318 polling booths.

== Members of Legislative Assembly ==
Election	Member	Party
Bihar Legislative Assembly
1952	Rameshwar Prasad Mahato	Chota Nagpur Santhal Parganas Janata Party
1957	Rameshwar Prasad Mahato	Chota Nagpur Santhal Parganas Janata Party
1962	Kamakhya Narain Singh	Swatantra Party
1967	I. J. N. Singh	Jan Kranti Dal
1969	I. J. N. Singh	Janata Party
1972	Rameshwar Prasad Mahato	Indian National Congress
1977	Lalita Rajya Lakshmi	Janata Party
1980	Niranjan Prasad Singh	Indian National Congress
1985	Niranjan Prasad Singh	Indian National Congress
1990	Ram Lakhan Singh	Communist Party of India
1995	Manoj Kumar Yadav	Indian National Congress
2000	Manoj Kumar Yadav	Indian National Congress
Jharkhand Legislative Assembly
2005	Manoj Kumar Yadav	Indian National Congress
2009	Umashankar Akela	Bharatiya Janata Party
2014	Manoj Kumar Yadav	Indian National Congress
2019	Umashankar Akela	Indian National Congress
2024	Manoj Kumar Yadav	Bharatiya Janata Party

== Election results ==
=== Assembly election 2024 ===
2024 Jharkhand Legislative Assembly election: Barhi
Party	Candidate	Votes	%	±%
BJP	Manoj Kumar Yadav	113,274	51.09	▲10.62
INC	Arun Sahu	63,983	28.86	▼17.92
SP	Umashankar Akela	23,629	10.66	New
JLKM	Krishn Kumar Yadav	4,897	2.21	New
Independent	Ramashish Singh	3,056	1.38	New
Independent	Avinash Kumar	2,352	1.06	New
Independent	Virju Paswan	2,273	1.03	New
NOTA	None of the Above	1,508	0.68	▼0.37
Margin of victory		49,291	22.23	▲15.93
Turnout		2,21,693	66.15	▲3.51
Registered electors		3,35,144		▲16.41
BJP gain from INC		Swing	▲4.31	

=== Assembly election 2019 ===
2019 Jharkhand Legislative Assembly election: Barhi
Party	Candidate	Votes	%	±%
INC	Umashankar Akela	84,358	46.78	▲13.65
BJP	Manoj Kumar Yadav	72,987	40.48	▲11.40
JVM(P)	Arbind Kumar	4,282	2.37	▼0.98
Independent	Mo. Seraj	3,686	2.04	New
Independent	Bipin Kumar Sinha	2,451	1.36	New
CPI	Ramanuj Kumar	2,219	1.23	▼0.72
BSP	Md. Jamal Uddin	2,032	1.13	▼0.55
NOTA	None of the Above	1,898	1.05	▼1.03
Margin of victory		11,371	6.31	▲2.25
Turnout		1,80,319	62.63	▼3.73
Registered electors		2,87,892		▲9.49
INC hold		Swing	▲13.65	

=== Assembly election 2014 ===
2014 Jharkhand Legislative Assembly election: Barhi
Party	Candidate	Votes	%	±%
INC	Manoj Kumar Yadav	57,818	33.13	▼7.13
BJP	Umashankar Akela	50,733	29.07	▼17.46
JMM	Sabi Devi	39,255	22.50	▲19.87
JVM(P)	Yogendra Pratap	5,857	3.36	New
CPI	Manju Gautam	3,412	1.96	New
Independent	Basudeo Paswan	3,087	1.77	New
BSP	Santosh Ravidas	2,918	1.67	▼0.56
NOTA	None of the Above	3,629	2.08	New
Margin of victory		7,085	4.06	▼2.21
Turnout		1,74,503	66.37	▲4.06
Registered electors		2,62,939		▲26.97
INC gain from BJP		Swing	▼13.40	

=== Assembly election 2009 ===
2009 Jharkhand Legislative Assembly election: Barhi
Party	Candidate	Votes	%	±%
BJP	Umashankar Akela	60,044	46.53	▲42.96
INC	Manoj Kumar Yadav	51,959	40.27	▼5.79
Independent	Hari Mehta	3,482	2.70	New
JMM	Binod Kumar	3,391	2.63	New
BSP	Md. Moinuddin Ahmed	2,885	2.24	▼1.31
AJSU	Akhtar Ali	1,699	1.32	New
Independent	Paras Sharan Deo	1,591	1.23	New
Margin of victory		8,085	6.27	▼0.31
Turnout		1,29,034	62.31	▼0.14
Registered electors		2,07,089		▲2.14
BJP gain from INC		Swing	▲0.48	

=== Assembly election 2005 ===
2005 Jharkhand Legislative Assembly election: Barhi
Party	Candidate	Votes	%	±%
INC	Manoj Kumar Yadav	58,313	46.06	▼21.20
SP	Umashankar Akela	49,990	39.48	New
BJP	Kamta Prasad Agrawal	4,525	3.57	▼14.98
BSP	Basudeo Paswan	4,491	3.55	▲1.57
Independent	Ranjit Kumar	2,406	1.90	New
Independent	Deepak Kumar	1,755	1.39	New
AD(K)	Abdul Razak Ansari	1,483	1.17	New
Margin of victory		8,323	6.57	▼42.13
Turnout		1,26,613	62.45	▼5.12
Registered electors		2,02,742		▲27.18
INC hold		Swing	▼21.20	

=== Assembly election 2000 ===
2000 Bihar Legislative Assembly election: Barhi
Party	Candidate	Votes	%	±%
INC	Manoj Kumar Yadav	72,443	67.25	New
BJP	Mahaveer Sahu	19,983	18.55	New
CPI	Krishna Kumar	5,878	5.46	New
Independent	Umashankar Akela	3,750	3.48	New
BSP	Basudeo Paswan	2,129	1.98	New
RJD	Girdhari Lal Yadav	1,720	1.60	New
JPP	Santosh Sahay	562	0.52	New
Margin of victory		52,460	48.70	
Turnout		1,07,720	68.78	
Registered electors		1,59,415		
INC win (new seat)				

== See also ==
- Vidhan Sabha
- List of states of India by type of legislature
