= Chauparan =

- Census Town
- Location in Jharkhand, India Chauparan (India)
- Coordinates: 24.38°N 85.25°E
- Country: India
- State: Jharkhand
- District: Hazaribagh
- Elevation: 396 m (1,299 ft)

Population (2011)
  - Total: 5,361

Languages
  - Official: Hindi, Urdu
- Time zone: UTC+5:30 (IST)
- PIN: 825406
- Telephone code: 06547
- Vehicle registration: JH 02
- Lok Sabha constituency: Hazaribagh
- Vidhan Sabha constituency: Barhi
- Website: hazaribag.nic.in

Chauparan is a census town in the Chauparan CD block in the Barhi subdivision of the Hazaribagh district in the Indian state of Jharkhand.

== Geography ==
Cities, towns and locations in Hazaribagh district in North Chotanagpur Division
Some census towns and locations around Hazaribagh city have been shown in the Hazaribagh City map
M: municipality, CT: census town, R: rural/ urban centre, T: tourist centre, D: dam, HS: hot spring
Owing to space constraints in the small map, the actual locations in a larger map may vary slightly

=== Location ===
Chauparan is located at 24.38°N 85.25°E. It has an average elevation of 396 metres (1,299 ft).

=== Area overview ===
Hazaribagh district is a plateau area and forests occupy around about 45% of the total area. It is a predominantly rural area with 92.34% of the population living in rural areas against 7.66% in the urban areas. There are many census towns in the district, as can be seen in the map alongside. Agriculture is the main occupation of the people but with the extension of coal mines, particularly in the southern part of the district, employment in coal mines is increasing. However, it has to be borne in mind that modern mining operations are highly mechanised. Four operational areas of Central Coalfields are marked on the map. All these areas are spread across partly this district and partly the neighbouring districts.

Note: The map alongside presents some of the notable locations in the district. All places marked in the map are linked in the larger full screen map. Urbanisation data calculated on the basis of census data for CD blocks and may vary a little against unpublished official data.

== Civic administration ==
=== Police station ===
Chauparan police station serves the Chauparan block.

=== CD block HQ ===
The headquarters of Chauparan block are located at Chauparan.

== Demographics ==
According to the 2011 Census of India, Chauparan had a total population of 5,361, of which 2,691 (50%) were males and 2,670 (50%) were females. Population in the age range 0–6 years was 918. The total number of literate persons in Chauparan was 3,428 (77.16% of the population over 6 years).

== Infrastructure ==
According to the District Census Handbook 2011, Hazaribagh, Chauparan covered an area of 4.94 km^{2}. Among the civic amenities, it had 47 km roads with open drains, the protected water supply involved hand pumps, uncovered wells. It had 645 domestic electric connections, 26 road light points. Among the educational facilities it had 3 primary schools, 2 middle schools, 2 secondary schools, 2 senior secondary schools. It had the branch offices of 1 nationalised bank, 1 cooperative bank, 1 agricultural credit society.

== Transport ==
Chauparan is on National Highway 19 (old number: NH 2/ Grand Trunk Road). Tilaiya Dam of Damodar Valley Corporation is about 15 kilometres (9.3 mi) from Chauparan. A road links it to Itkhori and Chatra.

== Education ==
Shahid Bhagat Singh +2 School Jhapa Bisanpur, Shishu Vidya Mandir Dadpur Munam Public School & Surekha Prakashbhai Public School which are affiliated to CBSE. K.B.S.S +2 school affiliated to Jharkhand Academic Council. Sundarlal Jain High School Singhrawan, Chauparan affiliated to Jharkhand Academic Council Ranchi. Chauparan Inter College affiliated to Jharkhand Academic council.
