= Nawadih Satgawan =

Nawadih Nawadih
- Block: Satgawan
- District: Koderma
- State: Jharkhand
- Elevation: 92 m (302 ft)

Nawadih is a village in Satgawan block of Koderma District in the Indian state of Jharkhand.

== Demographics ==
The primary languages are Khortha and Hindi.

== Geography ==
It is located 59 km East of Koderma, 200 km from State capital Ranchi.

Nawadih is surrounded by Sakri River in North and East, Khutta towards South and Tamoriya in the West.

Jhumri Tilaiya, Nawada and Ranchi are the nearby cities.
