= Barkatha =

- Village
- Location in Jharkhand, India Barkatha (India)
- Coordinates: 24.1739°N 85.6107°E
- Country: India
- State: Jharkhand
- District: Hazaribagh

Population (2011)
  - Total: 8,364

Languages (*For language details see Barkatha (community development block)#Language and religion)
  - Official: Hindi, Urdu
- Time zone: UTC+5:30 (IST)
- PIN: 825323 (Barkatha)
- Telephone/ STD code: 06548
- Vehicle registration: JH 02
- Website: hazaribag.nic.in

Barakatha (also spelled Barahkatha) is a village in the Barkatha CD block in the Barhi subdivision of the Hazaribagh district in the Indian state of Jharkhand.

== Geography ==
Cities, towns and locations in Hazaribagh district in North Chotanagpur Division
Some census towns and locations around Hazaribagh city have been shown in the Hazaribagh City map
M: municipality, CT: census town, R: rural/ urban centre, T: tourist centre, D: dam, HS: hot spring
Owing to space constraints in the small map, the actual locations in a larger map may vary slightly

=== Location ===
Barkatha is located at 24.1739°N 85.6107°E.

Surajkund hot spring is 5 kilometres (3.1 mi) from Barkatha.

=== Area overview ===
Hazaribagh district is a plateau area and forests occupy around about 45% of the total area. It is a predominantly rural area with 92.34% of the population living in rural areas against 7.66% in the urban areas. There are many census towns in the district, as can be seen in the map alongside. Agriculture is the main occupation of the people but with the extension of coal mines, particularly in the southern part of the district, employment in coal mines is increasing. However, it has to be borne in mind that modern mining operations are highly mechanised. Four operational areas of Central Coalfields are marked on the map. All these areas are spread across partly this district and partly the neighbouring districts.

Note: The map alongside presents some of the notable locations in the district. All places marked in the map are linked in the larger full screen map. Urbanisation data calculated on the basis of census data for CD blocks and may vary a little against unpublished official data.

== Civic administration ==
=== Police station ===
Barkatha police station serves the Barkatha CD block.

=== CD block HQ ===
The headquarters of Barkatha CD block are located at Barkatha.

== Demographics ==
According to the 2011 Census of India Barahkatha had a total population of 8,364, of which 4,354 (52%) were males and 4,010 (48%) were females. Population in the age range 0-6 years was 1,511. The total number of literate persons in Barahkatha was 4,559 (66.53% of the population over 6 years).

== Transport ==
Barkatha is on National Highway 19 (old NH 2) / Grand Trunk Road.

== Education ==
Chotanagpur Inter College at Berokala (Berokalan), PS Barkatha, was established in 2005. It offers courses in arts, science and commerce.
