= Barkatha Assembly constituency =

Constituency of the Jharkhand legislative assembly in India

Coordinates: 24.1667°N 85.6167°E

Barkatha
- Constituency No. 20 for the Jharkhand Legislative Assembly

Constituency details
- Country: India
- Region: East India
- State: Jharkhand
- District: Hazaribagh
- Lok Sabha constituency: Kodarma
- Established: 1977
- Total electors: 338,721
- Reservation: None

Member of Legislative Assembly
- 6th Jharkhand Legislative Assembly
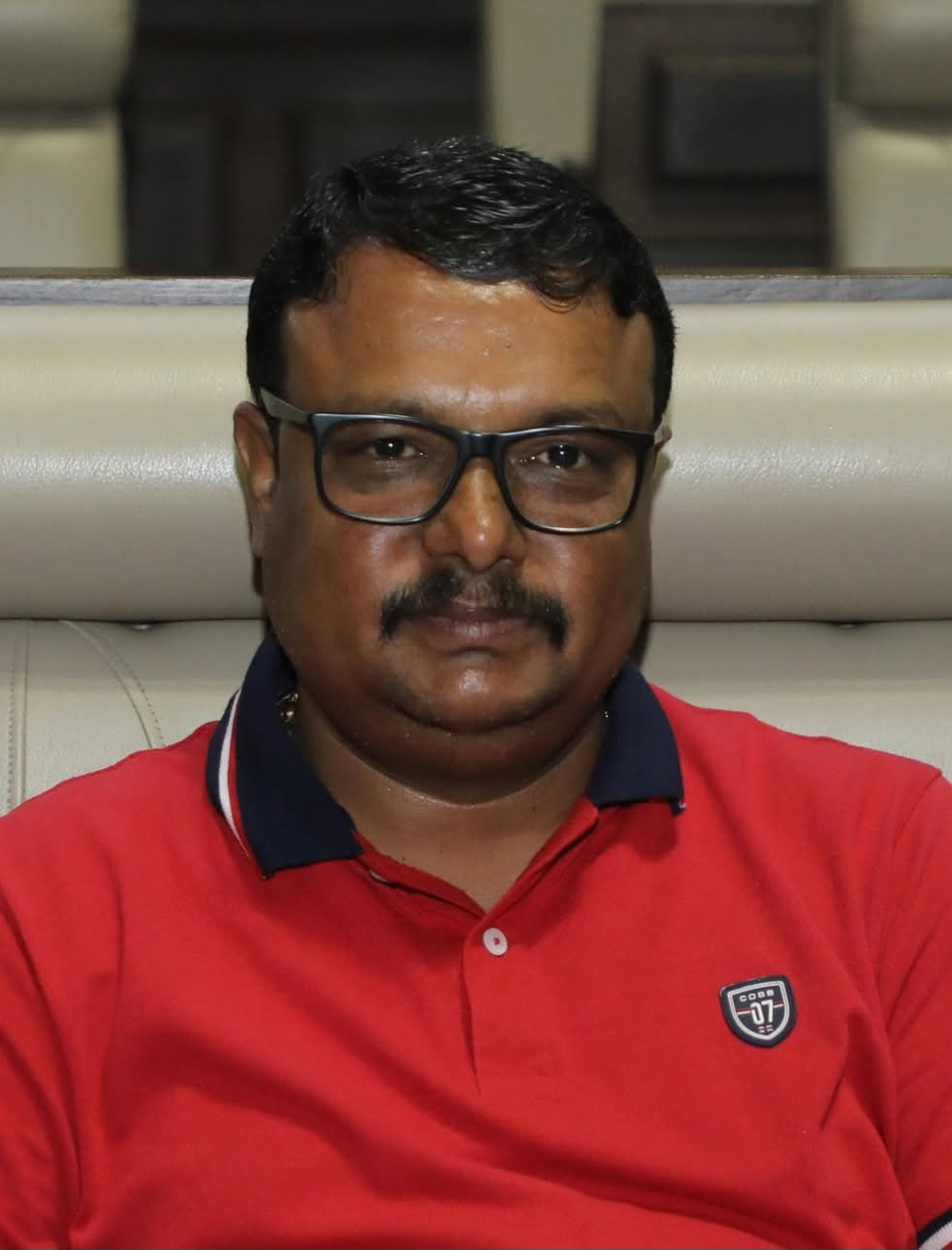
- Incumbent Amit Kumar Yadav
- Party: BJP
- Elected year: 2024

Barkatha Assembly constituency is an assembly constituency in the Indian state of Jharkhand.

Overview

Barkatha Assembly constituency covers: Barkatha and Jainagar Police Stations in Kodarma sub-division; and Ichak Police Station in Hazaribagh Sadar sub-division.

Barkatha assembly constituency is part of Kodarma (Lok Sabha constituency).

Barkatha constituency was established in 1977. The very first MLA from this constituency was Shri Sukhdeo Yadav who won by a record margin- a record which stands tall till today.

== Members of Legislative Assembly ==
Year	Member	Party
Bihar Legislative Assembly
Before 1977: Constituency did not exist
1977	Sukhdeo Yadav	Janata Party
1980	Bhubneshwar Prasad Mehta	Communist Party of India
1985	Lambodar Pathak	Indian National Congress
1990	Khagendra Prasad	Bharatiya Janata Party
2000	Bhubneshwar Prasad Mehta	Communist Party of India
Jharkhand Legislative Assembly
2005	Chitranjan Yadav	Bharatiya Janata Party
2009	Amit Kumar Yadav	Bharatiya Janata Party
2014	Janki Prasad Yadav	Jharkhand Vikas Morcha
2019	Amit Kumar Yadav	Independent politician
2024	Amit Kumar Yadav	Bharatiya Janata Party

== Election results ==
=== Assembly Election 2024 ===
2024 Jharkhand Legislative Assembly election: Barkatha
Party	Candidate	Votes	%	±%
BJP	Amit Kumar Yadav	82,221	32.77	▲10.20
JMM	Janki Prasad Yadav	78,561	31.31	New
Independent	Bateshwer Pd. Mehta	39,524	15.75	New
Lokhit Adhikar Party	Kumkum Devi	12,516	4.99	New
JLKM	Mahendra Prasad	7,878	3.14	New
Independent	Ramchandra Prasad	4,387	1.75	New
Independent	Rajkumar Paswan	4,093	1.63	New
NOTA	None of the Above	1,031	0.41	▼0.26
Margin of victory		3,660	1.46	▼10.27
Turnout		2,50,905	64.55	▲2.07
Registered electors		3,88,713		▲14.76
BJP gain from Independent		Swing	▼1.52	

=== Assembly Election 2019 ===
2019 Jharkhand Legislative Assembly election: Barkatha
Party	Candidate	Votes	%	±%
Independent	Amit Kumar Yadav	72,572	34.29	New
BJP	Janki Prasad Yadav	47,760	22.57	▼5.73
JVM(P)	Bateshwar Prasad Mehta	33,526	15.84	▼16.67
AIMIM	Mohammad Asraf Ansari	18,416	8.70	New
CPI	Diganbar Kumar Mehta	5,634	2.66	▼0.75
Independent	Ramchandra Prasad	5,323	2.52	New
RJD	Mohammad Khalid Khalil	4,867	2.30	New
NOTA	Nota	1,419	0.67	▼1.97
Margin of victory		24,812	11.72	▲7.51
Turnout		2,11,618	62.48	▼2.05
Registered electors		3,38,721		▲12.20
Independent gain from JVM(P)		Swing	▲1.78	

=== Assembly Election 2014 ===
2014 Jharkhand Legislative Assembly election: Barkatha
Party	Candidate	Votes	%	±%
JVM(P)	Janki Prasad Yadav	63,336	32.51	▲11.31
BJP	Amit Kumar Yadav	55,129	28.30	▲0.51
JMM	Digamber Kumar Mehta	19,282	9.90	▲3.02
JD(U)	Bateshwar Prasad Mehta	17,183	8.82	New
NCP	Mohammad Asraf Ansari	8,101	4.16	New
CPI	Mahadeo Ram	6,651	3.41	▼1.74
Jharkhand Party	Rajendra Prasad	6,592	3.38	New
NOTA	None of the Above	5,140	2.64	New
Margin of victory		8,207	4.21	▼2.38
Turnout		1,94,801	64.53	▲4.26
Registered electors		3,01,890		▲28.07
JVM(P) gain from BJP		Swing	▲4.72	

=== Assembly Election 2009 ===
2009 Jharkhand Legislative Assembly election: Barkatha
Party	Candidate	Votes	%	±%
BJP	Amit Kumar Yadav	39,485	27.79	▲3.54
JVM(P)	Janki Prasad Yadav	30,117	21.20	New
SP	Digamber Kumar Mehta	21,119	14.87	New
INC	Jai Shankar Pathak	11,493	8.09	New
JMM	Kamal Nayan Singh	9,769	6.88	▼6.22
CPI	Bhubneshwar Prasad Mehta	7,321	5.15	▼2.53
Independent	Ram Kishor Mehta	5,127	3.61	New
Margin of victory		9,368	6.59	▲2.06
Turnout		1,42,062	60.26	▼4.02
Registered electors		2,35,729		▼0.80
BJP hold		Swing	▲3.54	

=== Assembly Election 2005 ===
2005 Jharkhand Legislative Assembly election: Barkatha
Party	Candidate	Votes	%	±%
BJP	Chitranjan Yadav	37,052	24.25	▼3.59
Independent	Digamber Kumar Mehta	30,129	19.72	New
RJD	Janki Prasad Yadav	25,781	16.88	▼3.44
JMM	Kamal Nayan Singh	20,006	13.09	New
CPI	Baleshwar Prasad	11,741	7.69	▼20.91
Independent	Jaideo Chaudhary	8,740	5.72	New
CPI(ML)L	Mahendra Das	5,592	3.66	New
Margin of victory		6,923	4.53	▲3.78
Turnout		1,52,776	64.29	▲4.46
Registered electors		2,37,637		▲22.57
BJP gain from CPI		Swing	▼4.34	

=== Assembly Election 2000 ===
2000 Bihar Legislative Assembly election: Barkatha
Party	Candidate	Votes	%	±%
CPI	Bhubneshwar Prasad Mehta	33,169	28.60	New
BJP	Khagendra Prasad	32,294	27.84	New
RJD	Janki Prasad Yadav	23,562	20.31	New
INC	Basudeo Yadav	16,392	14.13	New
BSP	Tuklal Nayak	5,493	4.74	New
NCP	Birbal Prasad Mehta	2,863	2.47	New
Independent	Fuleshwar Ram	1,497	1.29	New
Margin of victory		875	0.75	
Turnout		1,15,989	60.79	
Registered electors		1,93,875		
CPI win (new seat)				

== See also ==
- Vidhan Sabha
- List of states of India by type of legislature
