= Barhi subdivision =

- Subdivision
- Location in Jharkhand, India Barhi subdivision (India)
- Coordinates: 24.30°N 85.42°E
- Country: India
- State: Jharkhand
- District: Hazaribagh
- Headquarters: Barhi

Area
  - Total: 1,404.53 km^{2} (542.29 sq mi)

Population
  - Total: 523,834
  - Density: 372.960/km^{2} (965.963/sq mi)

Languages
  - Official: Hindi, Urdu
- Time zone: UTC+5:30 (IST)
- Website: hazaribag.nic.in

Barhi subdivision is an administrative subdivision of the Hazaribagh district in the North Chotanagpur division in the state of Jharkhand, India.

== History ==
Barhi was once a subdivisional town (up to 1872).

== Administrative set up ==
Hazaribagh district is divided in to two subdivisions – Hazaribagh Sadar and Barhi. There are 16 CD blocks and 15 revenue anchals with 1 statutory town, 16 census towns, 1308 villages and 257 gram panchayats in the district.

Details of the subdivision are as follows:

Subdivision	Headquarters	Area km^{2}	Population (2011)	Rural population % (2011)	Urban population % (2011)
Hazaribagh Sadar	Hazaribagh	2,903.26	1,210,661	91.12	7.66
Barhi	Barhi	1,404.53	523,834	95.13	4.87

Note: Data calculated on the basis of census data for CD blocks and may vary a little against unpublished official data.

Cities, towns and locations in Hazaribagh district in North Chotanagpur Division
Some census towns and locations around Hazaribagh city are shown in the Hazaribagh City map.
M: municipality, CT: census town, R: rural/ urban centre, T: tourist centre, D: dam, HS: hot spring.
Owing to space constraints in the small map, the actual locations in a larger map may vary slightly.

== Demographics ==
According to the 2011 Census of India data, Barhi subdivision, in Hazaribagh district, had a total population of 523,834. There were 267,645 (51%) males and 257,189 (49%) females. Scheduled castes numbered 97,542 (18.62%) and scheduled tribes numbered 16,692 (3.19%). The literacy rate was 67.00% (for the population below 6 years).

== Police stations ==
Police stations in Hazaribagh Sadar subdivision are at:

1. Barhi
2. Barkatha
3. Chauparan
4. Gorhar

== Blocks ==
Community development blocks in the Barhi subdivision are:

CD block	Headquarters	Area km^{2}	Population (2011)	SC %	ST %	Literacy rate %	CT
Barhi	Barhi	365.47	131,660	17.24	2.67	68.39	Barhi, Konra
Barkatha	Barkatha	281.05	122,269	12.89	6.09	61.44	-
Chalkusha	Chalkusha	149.10	52,068	13.87	1.51	67.13	-
Chauparan	Chauparan	482.37	161,814	25.91	2.53	69.41	Chauparan
Padma	Padma	126.54	56,014	17.72	1.50	68.90	-

== Education ==
In 2011, in the Barhi subdivision out of a total 490 inhabited villages there were 97 villages with pre-primary schools, 366 villages with primary schools, 185 villages with middle schools, 50 villages with secondary schools, 17 villages with senior secondary schools, 1 village with non-formal education centre, 4 villages with vocational training centres/ ITI, 115 villages with no educational facility
.*Senior secondary schools are also known as Inter colleges in Jharkhand

=== Educational institutions ===
The following institution is located in Barhi subdivision:

- Ram Narayan Yadav Memorial College was established at Barhi in 1985.

== Healthcare ==
In 2011, in the Barhi subdivision there were 14 villages with primary health centres, 46 villages with primary health subcentres, 8 villages with maternity and child welfare centres, 7 villages with allopathic hospitals, 13 villages with dispensaries, 1 village with veterinary hospital, 2 villages with family welfare centres, and 37 villages with medicine shops.
*Private medical practitioners, alternative medicine etc. not included

=== Medical facilities ===
(Anybody having referenced information about location of government/ private medical facilities may please add it here)
