= Hazaribagh Wildlife Sanctuary =

Wildlife sanctuary in Jharkhand, India

- IUCN category IV (habitat/species management area)
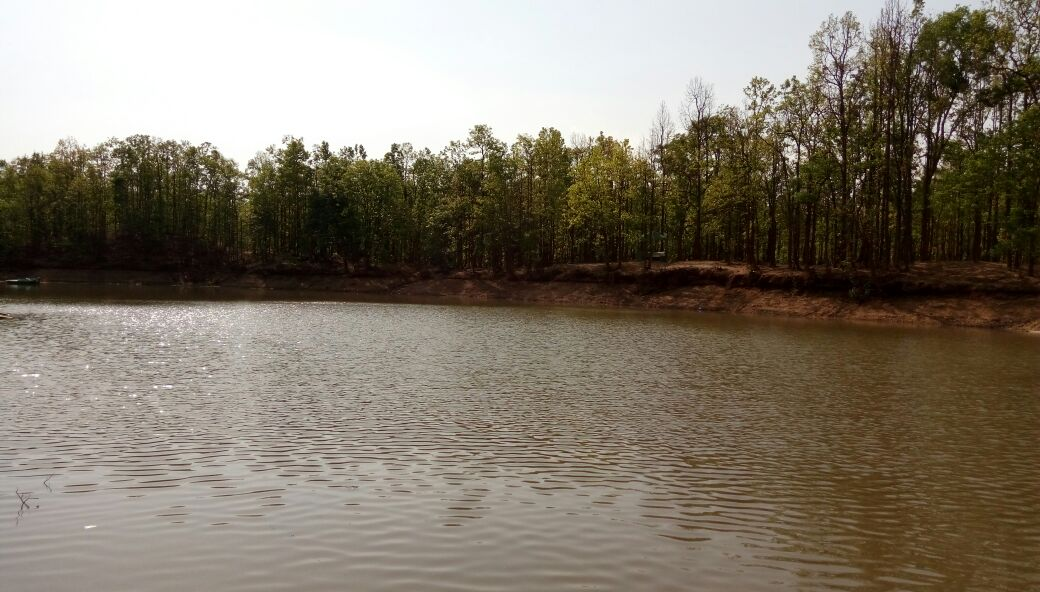
- Sal forest in Hazaribagh Wildlife Sanctuary

- Location within Jharkhand Location within India
- Interactive map of Hazaribagh Wildlife Sanctuary
- Location: Jharkhand, India
- Nearest city: Hazaribagh
- Coordinates: 24.1474°N 85.36°E
- Area: 184 km^{2} (71 sq mi)
- Established: 1955
- Governing body: Department of Environment, Forest and Climate Change, Government of Jharkhand
- Website: Official website

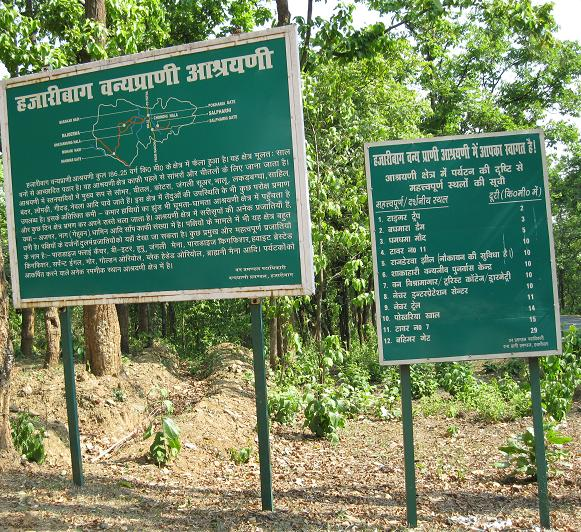
A display at the entrance of the sanctuary giving relevant details in Hindi

Hazaribagh Wildlife Sanctuary is a wildlife sanctuary in Jharkhand, India, about 55 miles (89 km) north of Ranchi. It was established in 1955. It is home to many wild animals including deer, monkey and birds.

== History ==
The Hazaribagh wildlife sanctuary was established in 1955. It was unofficially called as Hazaribag National Park from 1955 to 1976.

It was a private hunting reserve of kings of Ramgarh. Rajderwa was private hunting lodge of kings which includes a enclosure of wild boar, barking deer and nilgai. The forest area got reduced due to deforestation and rampant hunting wiped out nearly all wildlife across the sanctuary.

== Wildlife ==
Nestling in low hilly terrain, at an average altitude of 615 metres (2,018 ft), it has an area of 184 km^{2} (71 mi^{2}) and consists of mixed deciduous forest with sal trees. It is home to various wild animals, including chital, sambar, wild boar, fox, striped hyenas, sloth bears, peafowl, and pigeons.

Earlier it was home to Indian wolf, Indian leopard and Bengal tiger but due to deforestation and hunting, many wild animals have been wiped out from the sanctuary. In January 2024, a tiger was videographed by the villagers in the sanctuary. According to forest officials, the tiger had come from Chhattisgarh through Palamu Tiger Reserve.
