= Chirki =

Village in Jharkhand, India

Coordinates: 24°03′N 86°10′E

Chirki is a village in Pirtand CD Block in Dumri subdivision of Giridih district in the Indian state of Jharkhand. Chirki is located on the NH 114A. The nearest railway station is 19 km Parasnath (PNME).

Population (2015):- 13601 Area: 11sq. km

Pirtand and Chirki are adjacent villages. Pirtand block and police station are situated at Chirki.
