= Mirzaganj, Jharkhand =

Mirzaganj
- Village
- Location in Jharkhand, India Mirzaganj (India)
- Coordinates: 24.390278°N 86.173512°E
- Country: India
- State: Jharkhand
- District: Giridih

Population (2011)
  - Total: 2,817

Languages (*For language details see Jamua (community development block)#Language and religion)
  - Official: Hindi, Urdu
- Time zone: UTC+5:30 (IST)
- PIN: 815315
- Telephone/ STD code: 06554
- Vehicle registration: JH 11
- Lok Sabha constituency: Kodarma
- Vidhan Sabha constituency: Jamua
- Website: giridih.nic.in

Mirzaganj is a village in the Jamua CD block in the Khori Mahuwa subdivision of the Giridih district in the Indian state of Jharkhand.

== Geography ==
Cities, towns and locations in the Giridih district in North Chotanagpur Division
M: municipality, CT: census town, R: rural/ urban centre, H: historical/ religious/ tourist centre
Owing to space constraints in the small map, the actual locations in a larger map may vary slightly

=== Location ===
Mirzaganj is located at 24.390278°N 86.173512°E.

=== Area overview ===
Giridih district is a part of the Chota Nagpur Plateau, with rocky soil and extensive forests. Most of the rivers in the district flow from the west to east, except in the northern portion where the rivers flow north and north west. The Pareshnath Hill rises to a height of 4,479 feet (1,365 m). The district has coal and mica mines. It is an overwhelmingly rural district with small pockets of urbanisation.

Note: The map alongside presents some of the notable locations in the district. All places marked in the map are linked in the larger full screen map.

== Demographics ==
According to the 2011 Census of India, Mirzaganj had total population of 2,817, of which 1,506 (53%) were males and 1,311 (47%) were females. Population in the age range 0–6 years was 403. The total number of literate persons in Mirzaganj was 2,047 (84.80% of the population over 6 years).

== Education ==
Langtababa Mahavidyalaya was established at Mirzaganj in 1983. It is affiliated to Vinoba Bhave University.
