= List of CD blocks of Giridih District =

Blocks of Giridih

The following are the Community Development Blocks in Giridih District, Jharkhand:

List of Blocks of Giridih
Name	Subdivision	Area (km²)	Population	Population Density (/km²)	No. of Panchayats
Bagodar	Bagodar-Saria	350.71	158,094	451	22
Bengabad	Giridih Sadar	402.50	153,198	381	26
Birni	Bagodar-Saria	319.94	169,451	530	28
Deori	Khori Mahuwa	423.51	182,527	431	27
Dhanwar	Khori Mahuwa	352.40	267,352	759	39
Dumri	Dumri	427.34	226,006	529	37
Gandey	Giridih Sadar	366.09	175,087	478	26
Gawan	Khori Mahuwa	336.75	115,962	344	17
Giridih	Giridih Sadar	380.06	372,570	988	40
Jamua	Khori Mahuwa	478.50	271,563	568	42
Pirtand	Dumri	392.82	109,515	279	17
Sariya	Bagodar-Saria	193.40	149,068	771	23
Tisri	Khori Mahuwa	429.53	95,081	221	15
