= Dumri =

Dumri may refer to:

- Dumri, Giridih (community development block), Community development block in Giridih disatirict, Jharkhand, India
  - Dumri, Giridih, a village in Giridih district, Jharkhand, India
- Dumri, Gumla, community development block, in Gumla district, Jharkhand, India
  - Dumri, Gumla (village), in Jharkhand, India
- Dumri (Vidhan Sabha constituency), a constituency Giridih district, Jharkhand, India
- Dumri, Dildarnagar, a village in Uttar Pradesh, India
