= Kubri =

- Village
- Location in Jharkhand, India Kubri (India)
- Coordinates: 24.4024°N 85.8824°E
- Country: India
- State: Jharkhand

Population
  - Total: 1,949

Languages
  - Official: Hindi, Urdu
- Time zone: UTC+5:30 (IST)
- PIN: 825428
- Vehicle registration: JH
- Lok Sabha constituency: Kodarma
- Vidhan Sabha constituency: Dhanwar
- Website: giridih.nic.in

Kubri is a village in Dhanwar (community development block) in Khori Mahuwa subdivision of Giridih district in the Indian state of Jharkhand.

== Demographics ==
As per 2011 Census of India Kubri had a population of 1,949. There were 1,017 males and 932 females. Scheduled Castes numbered 548 and there were no Scheduled Tribes.

== Literacy ==
As of 2011 census the total number of literates in Kubri was 1,265 out of which 776 were males and 489 were females.

One of the Oldest High School of the district is situated in this village namely High School, Kubri established in 1954.

The land for the school is given by the late laxman ram. Alumni of this school is holding various higher post under Central as well as State Govt.

== Economy ==
The Head Post Office of the nearby area is functioning here. It is famous for small market mainly Shree Rana Store (Pro. B.K. Rana and Son), Leena Medical Hall where all the daily uses and essential materials are available.

Kubri has the largest bus stand, where peoples of many nearby villages are coming to pick the buses. Moreover, Rakesh Bagh Railway Station on Koderma Giridih Railway line is also situated at Kubri. More than 1000 persons of 20 nearby villages are using the railway transportation daily.

== Culture ==
Famous Thakurbari Dham, Sri Sachchidanand Mandir, Makdiha is situated in this village, where a temple of Shiva is situated.

== Politics ==
Kubri comes under the Makdiha Panchyat. Smt. Sarita Devi (W/o Sh. Bhuneshwar Kumar) from Kubri is presently elected as "Mukhia" of the Panchyat. It is under Dhanwar Legislative Assembly area and Koderma Loksabha area. The first Chief Minister of Jharkhand, Babulal Marandi, belongs to this Assembly area.
