= Birni, Giridih =

Birni
- Village
- Location in Jharkhand, India Birni (India)
- Coordinates: 24.274444°N 85.925278°E
- Country: India
- State: Jharkhand
- District: Giridih

Population (2011)
  - Total: 1,491

Languages (*For language details see Birni block#Language and religion)
  - Official: Hindi, Urdu
- Time zone: UTC+5:30 (IST)
- PIN: 825324 (Bangrakala)
- Telephone/ STD code: 06554
- Vehicle registration: JH 11
- Lok Sabha constituency: Kodarma
- Vidhan Sabha constituency: Bagodar
- Website: giridih.nic.in

Birni is a village in the Birni CD block in the Bagodar-Saria subdivision of the Giridih district in the Indian state of Jharkhand.

== Geography ==
Cities, towns and locations in the Giridih district in North Chotanagpur Division
M: municipality, CT: census town, R: rural/ urban centre, H: historical/ religious/ tourist centre
Owing to space constraints in the small map, the actual locations in a larger map may vary slightly

=== Location ===
Birni is located at 24.274444°N 85.925278°E.

=== Area overview ===
Giridih district is a part of the Chota Nagpur Plateau, with rocky soil and extensive forests. Most of the rivers in the district flow from the west to east, except in the northern portion where the rivers flow north and north west. The Pareshnath Hill rises to a height of 4,479 feet (1,365 m). The district has coal and mica mines. It is an overwhelmingly rural district with small pockets of urbanisation.

Note: The map alongside presents some of the notable locations in the district. All places marked in the map are linked in the larger full screen map.

== Demographics ==
According to the 2011 Census of India, Birni had a total population of 1,491, of which 761 (51%) were males and 730 (49%) were females. Population in the age range 0-6 years was 281. The total number of literate persons in Birni was 840 (69.42% of the population over 6 years).

== Civic administration ==
=== Police station ===
Birni police station has jurisdiction over Birni CD block. According to old British records, Birni PS was there after Giridh subdivision was formed in 1870.

=== CD block HQ ===
The headquarters of Birni CD block are located at Birni village.

== Transport ==
Suriya-Dhanwar Road passes through Birni.
