= Bengabad =

- Village
- Location in Jharkhand, India# India Bengabad (India)
- Coordinates: 24.301667°N 86.360833°E
- Country: India
- State: Jharkhand
- District: Giridih

Population (2011)
  - Total: 3,178

Languages(*For language details see Bengabad block#Language and religion)
  - Official: Hindi, Urdu
- Time zone: UTC+5:30 (IST)
- PIN: 815312 (Bengabad)
- Telephone/ STD code: 06552
- Vehicle registration: JH 11
- Lok Sabha constituency: Kodarma
- Vidhan Sabha constituency: Gandey
- Website: giridih.nic.in

Bengabad is a village in the Bengabad CD block in the Giridih Sadar subdivision of the Giridih district in the Indian state of Jharkhand.

== Geography ==
Cities, towns and locations in the Giridih district in North Chotanagpur Division
M: municipality, CT: census town, R: rural/ urban centre, H: historical/ religious/ tourist centre
Owing to space constraints in the small map, the actual locations in a larger map may vary slightly

=== Location ===
Bengabad is located at 24.301667°N 86.360833°E.

=== Area overview ===
Giridih district is a part of the Chota Nagpur Plateau, with rocky soil and extensive forests. Most of the rivers in the district flow from the west to east, except in the northern portion where the rivers flow north and north west. The Pareshnath Hill rises to a height of 4,479 feet (1,365 m). The district has coal and mica mines. It is an overwhelmingly rural district with small pockets of urbanisation.

Note: The map alongside presents some of the notable locations in the district. All places marked in the map are linked in the larger full screen map.

== Demographics ==
According to the 2011 Census of India, Bengabad had a total population of 3,178, of which 1,520 (48%) were males and 1,658 (52%) were females. Population in the age range 0–6 years was 459. The total number of literate persons in Bengabad was 2,194 (80.69% of the population over 6 years).

== Civic administration ==
=== Police station ===
Bengabad police station has jurisdiction over Bengabad CD block. According to old British records, Bengabad PS was there after Giridh subdivision was formed in 1870.

=== CD block HQ ===
The headquarters of Bengabad CD block are located at Bengabad.

== Transport ==
National Highway 114A passes through Bengabad.
