= Isri =

Isri Parasnath railway station
- Census Town
- Location in Jharkhand, India Isri (India)
- Coordinates: 23.99°N 86.03°E
- Country: India
- State: Jharkhand
- District: Giridih

Area
  - Total: 3.24 km^{2} (1.25 sq mi)

Population (2011)
  - Total: 9,749
  - Density: 3,010/km^{2} (7,790/sq mi)

Languages(*For language details see Dumri, Giridih (community development block)#Language and religion)
  - Official: Hindi, Urdu
- Time zone: UTC+5:30 (IST)
- PIN: 825167
- Vehicle registration: JH
- Lok Sabha constituency: Giridih
- Vidhan Sabha constituency: Dumri
- Website: giridih.nic.in

Isri is a census town in the Dumri CD block in Dumri sub-division of Giridih district in the Indian state of Jharkhand.

== Overview ==
Isri Bazar is the main market of the block and is situated on NH 19 (old NH 2)/ Grand Trunk Road. The railway station is called Parasnath on the Grand Chord. Parasnath Hill is well known for Jain temples. Parasnath is a major destination for Jain pilgrims.

== Geography ==
Cities, towns and locations in the Giridih district in North Chotanagpur Division
M: municipality, CT: census town, R: rural/ urban centre, H: historical/ religious/ tourist centre
Owing to space constraints in the small map, the actual locations in a larger map may vary slightly

=== Location ===
Isri is located at 23.99°N 86.03°E.

=== Area overview ===
Giridih district is a part of the Chota Nagpur Plateau, with rocky soil and extensive forests. Most of the rivers in the district flow from the west to east, except in the northern portion where the rivers flow north and north west. The Pareshnath Hill rises to a height of 4,479 feet (1,365 m). The district has coal and mica mines. It is an overwhelmingly rural district with small pockets of urbanisation.

Note: The map alongside presents some of the notable locations in the district. All places marked in the map are linked in the larger full screen map.

== Demographics ==
According to the 2011 Census of India, Isri had a total population of 9,749, of which 5,088 (52%) were males and 4,661 (48%) were females. Population in the age range 0–6 years was 1,420. The total number of literate persons in Isri was 6,872 (82.51% of the population over 6 years).

As of 2001 India census, Isri had a population of 8,796. Males constitute 53% of the population and females 47%. Isri has an average literacy rate of 66%, higher than the national average of 59.5%: male literacy is 74%, and female literacy is 57%. In Isri, 15% of the population is under 6 years of age.

== Infrastructure ==
According to the District Census Handbook 2011, Giridih, Isri covered an area of 3.24 km^{2}. Among the civic amenities, it had 6 km roads with open drains, the protected water supply involved uncovered well, hand pump. It had 1,604 domestic electric connections, 15 road lighting points. Among the educational facilities it had 8 primary schools, 2 middle schools, 2 secondary schools. Among the social, recreational and cultural facilities it had 1 auditorium/ community hall. Two important commodities it produced were mustard oil, ghee. It had the branch offices of 3 nationalised banks, 1 private commercial bank, 2 cooperative banks, 1 agricultural credit society.

== Education ==
- Parashnath Mahavidyalaya was established at Isri Bazar in 1985. Affiliated to Vinoba Bhave University it offers bachelor's courses in arts, science and commerce.
- Jharkhand College, Dumri,
- PCDAV Public School, Hethnagar
- D.A.V. Central School, ISO 9001:2008,,
- Central Academy,
- P N D Jain High School - Isri Bazar,,
- St.Paul's High School - Aoura, Bagodar. Hafiz Ansari, Founder and Chairman of St. PHS. It was established on 27 July 2007.
- S.S.K.B. High School - Isri Bazar,
- Bhagat school -Isri Bazar,
- P N D Jain Middle School -Isri Bazar,
- Tara Modern Public School
- Honey Dew Public School- Dr. Sujit Mathur
- Progressive public school -Dumri

== Festivals ==
A number of festivals are celebrated including the following:

- Diwali
- Duragapuja
- Holi
- Eid
- Bakrid
- Muharram
- Shivratri
- Krishna janmastami
- Eid miladun-nabi
- Mahavir jayanti
- Chhath puja
- Karma
- Ramnavmi Puja
