= Asurbandh =

Asurbandh Nimiaghat
- Village
- Location in Jharkhand, India Asurbandh (India)
- Coordinates: 23.9234°N 86.0441°E
- Country: India
- State: Jharkhand
- District: Giridih

Population (2011)
  - Total: 4,098

Languages (*For language details see Dumri, Giridih (community development block)#Language and religion)
  - Official: Hindi, Urdu
- Time zone: UTC+5:30 (IST)
- PIN: 815312 (Bengabad)
- Telephone/ STD code: 06552
- Vehicle registration: JH 11
- Website: giridih.nic.in

Asurbandh is a village in the Dumri CD block in the Dumri subdivision of the Giridih district in the Indian state of Jharkhand.

== Geography ==
Cities, towns and locations in the Giridih district in North Chotanagpur Division
M: municipality, CT: census town, R: rural/ urban centre, H: historical/ religious/ tourist centre
Owing to space constraints in the small map, the actual locations in a larger map may vary slightly

=== Location ===
Asurbandh is located at 23.9234°N 86.0441°E.

=== Area overview ===
Giridih district is a part of the Chota Nagpur Plateau, with rocky soil and extensive forests. Most of the rivers in the district flow from the west to east, except in the northern portion where the rivers flow north and north west. The Pareshnath Hill rises to a height of 4,479 feet (1,365 m). The district has coal and mica mines. It is an overwhelmingly rural district with small pockets of urbanisation.

Note: The map alongside presents some of the notable locations in the district. All places marked in the map are linked in the larger full screen map.

== Demographics ==
According to the 2011 Census of India, Asurbandh had a total population of 4,098, of which 2,115 (52%) were males and 1,983 (48%) were females. Population in the age range 0-6 years was 678. The total number of literate persons in Asurbandh was 2,266 (66.26% of the population over 6 years).

== Civic administration ==
=== Police station ===
Nimiyaghat police station, located in Asurbandh, has jurisdiction over the Dumri CD block.

== Transport ==
Asurbandh is on Dumri-Bermo-Jaina Road, off NH 19 (old NH 2)/ Grand Trunk Road. Nimiaghat railway station on the Grand Chord is located nearby.
