= Jamtara, Giridih =

Census town in Jharkhand, India

Jamtara
- Census Town
- Location in Jharkhand, India Jamtara (India)
- Coordinates: 23.99542°N 86.014623°E
- Country: India
- State: Jharkhand
- District: Giridih

Area
  - Total: 4.54 km^{2} (1.75 sq mi)
- Elevation: 155 m (509 ft)

Population (2011)
  - Total: 6,255
  - Density: 1,380/km^{2} (3,570/sq mi)

Languages (*For language details see Dumri, Giridih (community development block)#Language and religion)
  - Official: Hindi, Urdu
- Time zone: UTC+5:30 (IST)
- PIN: 825106
- Telephone/ STD code: 06557
- Lok Sabha constituency: Giridih
- Vidhan Sabha constituency: Dumri
- Website: giridih.nic.in

Jamtara is a census town in the Dumri CD block in the Dumri subdivision of the Giridih district in the Indian state of Jharkhand.

== Geography ==
Cities, towns and locations in the Giridih district in North Chotanagpur Division
M: municipality, CT: census town, R: rural/ urban centre, H: historical/ religious/ tourist centre
Owing to space constraints in the small map, the actual locations in a larger map may vary slightly

=== Location ===
Jamtara is located at 23.99542°N 86.014623°E.

=== Area overview ===
Giridih district is a part of the Chota Nagpur Plateau, with rocky soil and extensive forests. Most of the rivers in the district flow from the west to east, except in the northern portion where the rivers flow north and north west. The Pareshnath Hill rises to a height of 4,479 feet (1,365 m). The district has coal and mica mines. It is an overwhelmingly rural district with small pockets of urbanisation.

Note: The map alongside presents some of the notable locations in the district. All places marked in the map are linked in the larger full screen map.

== Demographics ==
According to the 2011 Census of India, Jamtara had a total population of 6,255, of which 3,249 (52%) were males and 3,006 (48%) were females. Population in the age range 0–6 years was 949. The total number of literate persons in Jamtara was 3,906 (73.61% of the population over 6 years).

== Infrastructure ==
According to the District Census Handbook 2011, Giridih, Jamtara covered an area of 4.54 km^{2}. Among the civic amenities, it had 48 km roads with open drains, the protected water supply involved uncovered well, hand pump. It had 879 domestic electric connections, 15 road light points. Among the educational facilities it had 6 primary schools, 3 middle schools, 2 secondary schools, 2 senior secondary schools, 1 general degree college. It had 9 non-formal education centres (Sarva Siksha Abhiyan). Among the social, recreational and cultural facilities it had 1 stadium, 1 cinema theatre, 1 auditorium/ community hall, 1 public library, reading room. Two important commodities it produced were bamboo baskets, muri. It had the branch offices of 1 nationalised bank, 1 cooperative bank.
