= Dhanwar (community development block) =

Dhanwar Dhanvār
- Community Development Block
- Location in Giridih District
- Interactive map of Dhanwar
- Coordinates: 24°25′12″N 85°58′48″E
- Country: India
- State: Jharkhand
- District: Giridih
- Subdivision: Khori Mahuwa
- Headquarters: Dhanwar
- Panchayat: 39 (3rd)

Government
  - Type: Federal democracy
  - Block Development Officer: Devendra Kumar Das
  - Circle Officer: Guljar Anjum

Area
  - Total: 352.40 km^{2} (136.06 sq mi)
  - Rank: 9th
- Elevation: 323 m (1,060 ft)

Population (2011)
  - Total: 267,352
  - Rank: 3rd
  - Density: 758.66/km^{2} (1,964.9/sq mi)
  - Rank: 3rd

Languages
  - Official: Hindi, Urdu
- Time zone: UTC+5:30 (IST)
- PIN: 825412 (Raj Dhanwar)
- Telephone/STD code: 06556
- Vehicle registration: JH-11
- Lok Sabha constituency: Kodarma
- Vidhan Sabha constituency: Dhanwar
- Literacy: 65.44%
- Sex Ratio: 932
- Website: giridih.nic.in

Dhanwar is a community development block (CD block) that forms an administrative division in the Khori Mahuwa subdivision of the Giridih district in the Indian state of Jharkhand.

== Overview ==
Giridih is a plateau region. The western portion of the district is part of a larger central plateau. The rest of the district is a lower plateau, a flat table land with an elevation of about 1,300 feet. At the edges, the ghats drop to about 700 feet. The Pareshnath Hills or Shikharji rises to a height of 4,480 feet in the south-eastern part of the district. The district is thickly forested. Amongst the natural resources, it has coal and mica. Inaugurating the Pradhan Mantri Ujjwala Yojana in 2016, Raghubar Das, Chief Minister of Jharkhand, had indicated that there were 23 lakh BPL families in Jharkhand. There was a plan to bring the BPL proportion in the total population down to 35%.

== Maoist activities ==
Jharkhand is one of the states affected by Maoist activities. As of 2012, Giridih was one of the 14 highly affected districts in the state. As of 2016, Giridih was identified as one of the 13 focus areas by the state police to check Maoist activities. In 2017, the Moists, in Giridih district, have torched more than 50 vehicles engaged in road construction or carrying goods.

== Geography ==
Dhanwar is located at 24°25′12″N 85°58′48″E. It has an average elevation of 336 metres (1102 feet).

Dhanwar CD block is bounded by Gawan, Tisri and Deori CD blocks on the north, Jamua CD block on the east, Birni CD block on the south and Domchanch and Markacho CD blocks, in Koderma district, on the west.

Dhanwar CD block has an area of 352.41 km^{2}. It has 39 gram panchayats, 279 inhabited villages and 1 census town.. Dhanwar is the census town. Dhanwar police station serves this block. Headquarters of this CD block is at Dhanwar. 17.17% of the area has forest cover.

Rivers in Dhanwar CD block are Irga and Barako.

Gram panchayats in Dhanwar CD block are: Maheshmarwa, Balhara, Dornda (N), Dornda (S), Sirsai, Garjasaran, Lal Bazar, Bandhi, Ambatand, Pandeydih, Dhanwar (N), Dhanwar (S), Panchrukhi, Bhalitunda, Pandriya, Dhanaipura, Dumardiha, Gundari, Arkhango, Nimadih, Jeruadih, Makdiha, Chandrakho, Sapamaran, Barjo, Jarisingha, Gadi, Kendua, Giridih, Galwati, Kargali Khurd, Gorhand, Chatti, Dharampur, Bodgo, Hemrodih, Siramdih, Kailadhab and Parsan.

Villages in Dhanwar CD block
#	Villages	Administrative Division	Population
1	Aitochanch	Dhanwar	614
2	Alagdesi	Dhanwar	1,324
3	Alagdiha	Dhanwar	5
4	Ambatanr	Dhanwar	539
5	Ambatanr	Dhanwar	576
6	Ambatanr	Dhanwar	839
7	Andharkolwa	Dhanwar	106
8	Argali	Dhanwar	1,789
9	Arkhango	Dhanwar	4,213
10	Arwatanr	Dhanwar	573
11	Baddiha	Dhanwar	1,932
12	Badidih	Dhanwar	703
13	Baghmara	Dhanwar	925
14	Baghmari	Dhanwar	2,142
15	Baijudih	Dhanwar	1,021
16	Bakainia	Dhanwar	207
17	Balhara	Dhanwar	2,310
18	Balkidih	Dhanwar	310
19	Balwagarha	Dhanwar	523
20	Bammi	Dhanwar	2,200
21	Banasingha	Dhanwar	341
22	Bandaitanr	Dhanwar	468
23	Bandari Alias Rajaband	Dhanwar	351
24	Bangargi	Dhanwar	996
25	Banrhi	Dhanwar	1,445
26	Barajori	Dhanwar	721
27	Baramo	Dhanwar	1,168
28	Barjo	Dhanwar	3,717
29	Barotanr	Dhanwar	53
30	Barotanr	Dhanwar	571
31	Barotanr	Dhanwar	513
32	Barotanr	Dhanwar	60
33	Barsinghi Kalan	Dhanwar	421
34	Barsinghi Khurd	Dhanwar	837
35	Barwadih	Dhanwar	920
36	Basdubia	Dhanwar	235
37	Basgi	Dhanwar	1,219
38	Basgi	Dhanwar	711
39	Beko	Dhanwar	714
40	Beldaradih	Dhanwar	403
41	Benusaran	Dhanwar	921
42	Bhalutanr	Dhanwar	2,806
43	Bhaluwai	Dhanwar	950
44	Bharauna	Dhanwar	458
45	Bhingodih	Dhanwar	1,677
46	Bhundharni	Dhanwar	586
47	Bhutaha	Dhanwar	492
48	Bishunpur	Dhanwar	966
49	Bodgo	Dhanwar	1,234
50	Budhuadih	Dhanwar	1,071
51	Budhuatanr	Dhanwar	1,030
52	Chadgar	Dhanwar	1,138
53	Chand Raidih	Dhanwar	174
54	Chandania	Dhanwar	377
55	Chandarkho	Dhanwar	1,929
56	Chandra Nagar	Dhanwar	1,403
57	Chango Singha	Dhanwar	861
58	Chatti	Dhanwar	2,831
59	Chichaidih	Dhanwar	502
60	Chiguadih	Dhanwar	431
61	Chihutimaran	Dhanwar	735
62	Chinikiro	Dhanwar	141
63	Chitmatanr	Dhanwar	576
64	Chonrhitanr	Dhanwar	580
65	Chunjhkho	Dhanwar	843
66	Daldal	Dhanwar	1,047
67	Dariadih	Dhanwar	1,228
68	Darudih	Dhanwar	147
69	Darwedih	Dhanwar	1,008
70	Dasrodih	Dhanwar	1,115
71	Daudanagar	Dhanwar	695
72	Deyalpur	Dhanwar	570
73	Dhab	Dhanwar	613
74	Dhakosaran	Dhanwar	1,166
75	Dhanaipur	Dhanwar	1,529
76	Dhanwariadih	Dhanwar	777
77	Dharampur	Dhanwar	2,221
78	Dhemla Sarkwatanr	Dhanwar	458
79	Domaidih	Dhanwar	757
80	Doranda	Dhanwar	12,663
81	Dughara	Dhanwar	283
82	Dulho	Dhanwar	514
83	Dumardiha	Dhanwar	1,115
84	Dumardiha	Dhanwar	594
85	Dumardiha Alias Mirdha Singh	Dhanwar	2,687
86	Dumardiha Ghoskodih	Dhanwar	223
87	Dumargarha	Dhanwar	281
88	Durjanadih	Dhanwar	432
89	Ekaguri	Dhanwar	517
90	Ekdara	Dhanwar	863
91	Gadi	Dhanwar	849
92	Gadi	Dhanwar	3,945
93	Gadi	Dhanwar	1,092
94	Gaganpur	Dhanwar	277
95	Galwanti	Dhanwar	1,596
96	Gangapur	Dhanwar	1,545
97	Garhdih	Dhanwar	879
98	Garjasaran	Dhanwar	3,552
99	Ghaskaro	Dhanwar	699
100	Ghoskodih	Dhanwar	251
101	Ghoskodih	Dhanwar	489
102	Ghosnadih	Dhanwar	598
103	Ghuji	Dhanwar	280
104	Ghuji	Dhanwar	945
105	Girhidih	Dhanwar	1,549
106	Gobindpur	Dhanwar	128
107	Goraitamaran	Dhanwar	445
108	Gorhan	Dhanwar	4,641
109	Gosain Bigha	Dhanwar	373
110	Gosain Raidih	Dhanwar	835
111	Guakhanrhor	Dhanwar	908
112	Gundri	Dhanwar	3,214
113	Halwaia	Dhanwar	539
114	Hardatdih	Dhanwar	546
115	Hardia	Dhanwar	370
116	Harilai	Dhanwar	2
117	Harinmarwa	Dhanwar	432
118	Helhi Pardhandih	Dhanwar	531
119	Hemrodih	Dhanwar	1,998
120	Itasani	Dhanwar	717
121	Jabdia Alias Dakai Chuwa	Dhanwar	270
122	Jagman Raidih	Dhanwar	137
123	Jahanadih	Dhanwar	1,158
124	Jamridih	Dhanwar	1,188
125	Jari Singha	Dhanwar	2,009
126	Jaridih	Dhanwar	748
127	Jaruadih	Dhanwar	943
128	Jatadih	Dhanwar	215
129	Jatha	Dhanwar	1,243
130	Jhagrudih	Dhanwar	462
131	Jhalakdih	Dhanwar	389
132	Jhalbad	Dhanwar	307
133	Jhanjh	Dhanwar	89
134	Jhanjh	Dhanwar	373
135	Jhanjh	Dhanwar	534
136	Jharha	Dhanwar	94
137	Jhumri	Dhanwar	266
138	Jibniadih	Dhanwar	203
139	Jitkundi	Dhanwar	693
140	Jokiatila	Dhanwar	136
141	Jolahawadih	Dhanwar	445
142	Jolhabad	Dhanwar	1,131
143	Jorasemal	Dhanwar	6
144	Juruadih	Dhanwar	2,179
145	Kailadhab	Dhanwar	1,905
146	Kaili Pahari	Dhanwar	834
147	Kailpur	Dhanwar	1,205
148	Kargalikalan	Dhanwar	736
149	Kargalikhurd	Dhanwar	1,629
150	Karmatanr	Dhanwar	108
151	Karmatanr	Dhanwar	218
152	Karmatanr	Dhanwar	588
153	Karmatanr	Dhanwar	1,121
154	Karmatanr	Dhanwar	519
155	Karu Raidih	Dhanwar	297
156	Karudih	Dhanwar	846
157	Karudih Alias Koradih	Dhanwar	238
158	Katariatanr	Dhanwar	571
159	Katharatanr	Dhanwar	632
160	Kendua	Dhanwar	1,695
161	Khaira Singha	Dhanwar	731
162	Khairidih	Dhanwar	898
163	Khanrhara	Dhanwar	316
164	Khario	Dhanwar	127
165	Kherwani	Dhanwar	1,092
166	Khesarma	Dhanwar	657
167	Khesnal	Dhanwar	726
168	Kheto	Dhanwar	897
169	Khijarsota	Dhanwar	2,155
170	Khiriachatan	Dhanwar	253
171	Khorimahua	Dhanwar	1,112
172	Kirpalpur	Dhanwar	540
173	Kodwari	Dhanwar	388
174	Konratanr	Dhanwar	564
175	Koradih	Dhanwar	1,046
176	Koradih	Dhanwar	705
177	Koriadih	Dhanwar	255
178	Korwadih	Dhanwar	621
179	Kubri	Dhanwar	1,949
180	Kunda	Dhanwar	78
181	Kusumbhai	Dhanwar	1,072
182	Lalbazar	Dhanwar	4,106
183	Latbed	Dhanwar	487
184	Lengura	Dhanwar	689
185	Lodhipur	Dhanwar	470
186	Madhopur	Dhanwar	315
187	Madhopur	Dhanwar	1,858
188	Magho Khurd	Dhanwar	887
189	Maghokalan	Dhanwar	468
190	Mahishmarwa	Dhanwar	2,777
191	Mahthasar	Dhanwar	307
192	Mahuatanr	Dhanwar	189
193	Mahuatanr	Dhanwar	384
194	Majhladih	Dhanwar	5696
195	Majhladih	Dhanwar	349
196	Makatpur	Dhanwar	446
197	Makdiha	Dhanwar	1,958
198	Mangaso	Dhanwar	1,577
199	Mansadih	Dhanwar	175
200	Marpoka	Dhanwar	1,245
201	Marudih	Dhanwar	934
202	Masnodih	Dhanwar	893
203	Mayaramtola	Dhanwar	1,094
204	Modidih	Dhanwar	1,817
205	Mohnagarha	Dhanwar	99
206	Monodih	Dhanwar	613
207	Murna	Dhanwar	851
208	Naekdih (Nayakdih)	Dhanwar	731
209	Naikadih	Dhanwar	683
210	Naitanr	Dhanwar	283
211	Naitanr	Dhanwar	154
212	Nawadih	Dhanwar	795
213	Nawadih	Dhanwar	201
214	Nawadih	Dhanwar	294
215	Nawagarh	Dhanwar	1,982
216	Nichli Chitardih	Dhanwar	1,461
217	Nimadih	Dhanwar	3,263
218	Orkhar	Dhanwar	1,574
219	Pachrukhi	Dhanwar	1,749
220	Paharpur	Dhanwar	1,665
221	Paisara	Dhanwar	94
222	Pakaria	Dhanwar	97
223	Palangi	Dhanwar	564
224	Panchrukhi	Dhanwar	352
225	Pandaria	Dhanwar	1,377
226	Pandedih	Dhanwar	894
227	Pandedih	Dhanwar	1,262
228	Pandejor	Dhanwar	763
229	Pandnatanr	Dhanwar	647
230	Parhodih	Dhanwar	234
231	Parsan	Dhanwar	2,330
232	Pathaldiha	Dhanwar	289
233	Pindrabad	Dhanwar	149
234	Pipradih	Dhanwar	333
235	Piprakoni	Dhanwar	797
236	Potmagarha	Dhanwar	163
237	Puran Patari	Dhanwar	369
238	Purnadih	Dhanwar	457
239	Purnadih	Dhanwar	745
240	Purni Chitardih	Dhanwar	592
241	Purrekh Kalan	Dhanwar	888
242	Purrekh Khurd	Dhanwar	507
243	Rajgarha	Dhanwar	511
244	Rajodih	Dhanwar	1,065
245	Rakasbar	Dhanwar	542
246	Ratanpur	Dhanwar	607
247	Ratbad	Dhanwar	428
248	Ropamahua	Dhanwar	786
249	Rupnadih	Dhanwar	391
250	Ruputola	Dhanwar	849
251	Saharpura	Dhanwar	631
252	Sakhaitanr	Dhanwar	784
253	Salaia	Dhanwar	1,266
254	Salaidih	Dhanwar	1,370
255	Salariatanr	Dhanwar	36
256	Sapamaran	Dhanwar	1,753
257	Saunt Raidih	Dhanwar	803
258	Siari	Dhanwar	550
259	Siari	Dhanwar	354
260	Simaria	Dhanwar	281
261	Singardih	Dhanwar	825
262	Siramdih	Dhanwar	1,050
263	Sirmandih	Dhanwar	458
264	Sirsai	Dhanwar	938
265	Sonbad	Dhanwar	291
266	Sonbad	Dhanwar	629
267	Surangi	Dhanwar	64
268	Tailai	Dhanwar	508
269	Taranakho	Dhanwar	1,900
270	Telodih	Dhanwar	248
271	Telodih	Dhanwar	449
272	Thekatanr	Dhanwar	520
273	Tilaia	Dhanwar	224
274	Tokotanr	Dhanwar	962
275	Tungrudih	Dhanwar	484
276	Tunmalki	Dhanwar	470
277	Upraili Dhanwar	Dhanwar	4,355
278	Upraili Pardhandih	Dhanwar	742
279	Urmarari	Dhanwar	459
Source: ?

== Demographics ==
=== Population ===
According to the 2011 Census of India, Dhanwar CD block had a total population of 267,352, of which 258,575 were rural and 8,777 were urban. There were 138,380 (52%) males and 128,972 (48%) females. Population in the age range 0–6 years was 50,403. Scheduled Castes numbered 35,200 (13.17%) and Scheduled Tribes numbered 2,064 (0.77%).

The only census town in Dhanwar CD block is (2011 census population figure in brackets): Dhanwar (8,777).

=== Literacy ===
As of 2011 census the total number of literate persons in Dhanwar CD block was 141,963 (65.44% of the population over 6 years) out of which males numbered 89,562 (79.63% of the male population over 6 years) and females numbered 52,401 (50.16% of the female population over 6 years). The gender disparity (the difference between female and male literacy rates) was 29.47%.

As of 2011 census, literacy in Giridih district was 63.14% Literacy in Jharkhand was 66.41% in 2011. Literacy in India in 2011 was 74.04%.

See also – List of Jharkhand districts ranked by literacy rate

Literacy in CD Blocks of
Giridih district
Giridih subdivision
Giridih - 63.22%
Gandey - 56.30%
Bengabad - 59.33%
Dumri subdivision
Dumri - 63.55%
Pirtand - 47.22%
Bagodar Saria subdivision
Bagodar - 64.43%
Suriya - 66.25%
Birni - 61.47%
Khori Mahua subdivision
Dhanwar - 65.44%
Jamua - 63.99%
Deori - 62.54%
Tisri - 55.27%
Gawan - 60.94 %
Source: 2011 Census: CD Block Wise
Primary Census Abstract Data

=== Language and religion ===
Religions in Dhanwar CD block (2011)
Religion	Percent
Hinduism	72.92%
Islam	26.87%
Other or not stated	0.21%

Languages of Dhanwar block (2011)
1. Khortha (78.1%)
2. Hindi (17.7%)
3. Urdu (3.13%)
4. Others (1.10%)

Khortha is the main spoken language. Hindi is the official language. Urdu is also spoken.

== Rural poverty ==
40-50% of the population of Giridih district were in the BPL category in 2004–2005, being in the same category as Godda, Koderma and Hazaribagh districts. Rural poverty in Jharkhand declined from 66% in 1993–94 to 46% in 2004–05. In 2011, it has come down to 39.1%.

== Economy ==
=== Livelihood ===
Livelihood
in Dhanwar CD block
1. Cultivators (47.1%)
2. Agricultural labourers (32.3%)
3. Household industries (3.47%)
4. Other Workers (17.1%)

In Dhanwar CD block in 2011, amongst the class of total workers, cultivators numbered 58,318 and formed 47.13%, agricultural labourers numbered 40,014 and formed 32.34%, household industry workers numbered 4,297 and formed 3.47% and other workers numbered 21,114 and formed 17.06%. Total workers numbered 123,743 and formed 46.28% of the total population, and non-workers numbered 143,609 and formed 53.72% of the population.

Note: In the census records a person is considered a cultivator, if the person is engaged in cultivation/ supervision of land owned. When a person who works on another person's land for wages in cash or kind or share, is regarded as an agricultural labourer. Household industry is defined as an industry conducted by one or more members of the family within the household or village, and one that does not qualify for registration as a factory under the Factories Act. Other workers are persons engaged in some economic activity other than cultivators, agricultural labourers and household workers. It includes factory, mining, plantation, transport and office workers, those engaged in business and commerce, teachers, entertainment artistes and so on.

=== Infrastructure ===
There are 279 inhabited villages in Dhanwar CD block. In 2011, 147 villages had power supply. 18 villages had tap water (treated/ untreated), 277 villages had well water (covered/ uncovered), 262 villages had hand pumps, and all villages had drinking water facility. 33 villages had post offices, 16 villages had a sub post office, 7 villages had telephones (land lines) and 21 villages had mobile phone coverage. 275 villages had pucca (paved) village roads, 23 villages had bus service (public/ private), 15 villages had autos/ modified autos, and 68 villages had tractors. 26 villages had bank branches, 12 villages had agricultural credit societies, 12 villages had cinema/ video halls, 9 villages had public library and public reading room. 106 villages had public distribution system, 27 villages had weekly haat (market) and 185 villages had assembly polling stations.

=== Agriculture ===
Hills occupy a large portion of Giridih district. The soil is generally rocky and sandy and that helps jungles and bushes to grow. The forest area, forming a large portion of total area, in the district is evenly distributed all over. Some areas near the rivers have alluvial soil. In Dhanwar CD block, the percentage of cultivable area to total area is 25.17%. The percentage of cultivable area to the total area for the district, as a whole, is 27.04%. Irrigation is inadequate. The percentage of irrigated area to cultivable area in Dhanwar CD block is 17.41%. May to October is the Kharif season, followed by the Rabi season. Rice, sown in 50% of the gross sown area, is the main crop in the district. Other important crops grown are: maize, wheat, sugar cane, pulses and vegetables.

=== Backward Regions Grant Fund ===
Giridih district is listed as a backward region and receives financial support from the Backward Regions Grant Fund. The fund created by the Government of India is designed to redress regional imbalances in development. As of 2012, 272 districts across the country were listed under this scheme. The list includes 21 districts of Jharkhand.

== Transport ==
State Highway 13 (Jharkhand), running from Koderma to Gobindpur on NH 19 (old NH 2)/ Grand Trunk Road, passes through this block.

Madhupur-Giridih-Koderma line passes through this block and there is a station at Raj Dhanwar.

== Education ==
Dhanwar CD block had 99 villages with pre-primary schools, 216 villages with primary schools, 99 villages with middle schools, 17 villages with secondary schools, 4 villages with senior secondary schools, 1 village with a general degree college, 57 villages with no educational facility.
.*Senior secondary schools are also known as Inter colleges in Jharkhand

- Adarsh College was established at Rajdhanwar in 1973.
- Sanskrit Hindi Vidyapith was established at Jharkhand Dham, Giridih, in 1967. It is an institute specializing in Sanskrit, but also offers other courses. It is affiliated to Vinoba Bhave University. It has hostel facilities.

== Healthcare ==
Dhanwar CD block had 6 villages with primary health centres, 25 villages with primary health subcentres, 5 villages with maternity and child welfare centres, 5 villages with allopathic hospitals, 10 villages with dispensaries, 3 villages with veterinary hospitals, 4 villages with family welfare centres, 30 villages with medicine shops.
.*Private medical practitioners, alternative medicine etc. not included
