= Khukhra =

- Village
- Location in Jharkhand, India Khukhra (India)
- Coordinates: 24.007353°N 86.223378°E
- Country: India
- State: Jharkhand
- District: Giridih

Population (2011)
  - Total: 1,017

Languages (*For language details see Pirtand block#Language and religion)
  - Official: Hindi, Urdu
- Time zone: UTC+5:30 (IST)
- PIN: 825108
- Telephone/ STD code: 06532
- Vehicle registration: JH 11
- Lok Sabha constituency: Giridih
- Vidhan Sabha constituency: Giridih
- Website: giridih.nic.in

Khukhra is a village in the Pirtand CD block in the Dumri subdivision of the Giridih district in the Indian state of Jharkhand.

== Geography ==
Cities, towns and locations in the Giridih district in North Chotanagpur Division
M: municipality, CT: census town, R: rural/ urban centre, H: historical/ religious/ tourist centre
Owing to space constraints in the small map, the actual locations in a larger map may vary slightly

=== Location ===
Khukhra is located at 24.007353°N 86.223378°E.

== Demographics ==
According to the 2011 Census of India, Khukhra had total population of 1,017, of which 520 (51%) were males and 497 (49%) were females. Population in the age range 0–6 years was 172. The total number of literate persons in Khukhra was 555 (65.68% of the population over 6 years).

== Civic administration ==
=== Police station ===
Khukhra police station serves the Pirtand CD block.
