= Pirtand =

Pirtand Pirtanr
- Village
- Location in Jharkhand, India Pirtand (India)
- Coordinates: 24.0564353°N 86.163278°E
- Country: India
- State: Jharkhand
- District: Giridih

Languages (*For language details see Pirtand block#Language and religion)
  - Official: Hindi, Urdu
- Time zone: UTC+5:30 (IST)
- PIN: 825108 (Pirtand)
- Telephone/ STD code: 06532
- Vehicle registration: JH 11
- Lok Sabha constituency: Giridih
- Vidhan Sabha constituency: Giridih
- Website: giridih.nic.in

Pirtand (also spelled Pirtanr) is a village in the Pirtand CD block in the Dumri subdivision of the Giridih district in the Indian state of Jharkhand.

== Geography ==
Cities, towns and locations in the Giridih district in North Chotanagpur Division
M: municipality, CT: census town, R: rural/ urban centre, H: historical/ religious/ tourist centre
Owing to space constraints in the small map, the actual locations in a larger map may vary slightly

=== Location ===
Pirtand is located at 24.0564353°N 86.163278°E

According to Google maps, the administrative facilities of Pitand CD block are spread across the two adjacent villages of Pirtand and Chirki. However, according to the map of Pirtand CD block in the District Census Handbook, Giridih, the headquarters of Pirtand CD block is in Pirtand and Chirki is just an adjacent village.

=== Area overview ===
Giridih district is a part of the Chota Nagpur Plateau, with rocky soil and extensive forests. Most of the rivers in the district flow from the west to east, except in the northern portion where the rivers flow north and north west. The Pareshnath Hill rises to a height of 4,479 feet (1,365 m). The district has coal and mica mines. It is an overwhelmingly rural district with small pockets of urbanisation.

Note: The map alongside presents some of the notable locations in the district. All places marked in the map are linked in the larger full screen map.

== Demographics ==
According to the 2011 Census of India, Pirtand had a total population of 79, of which 58 (73%) were males and 21 (27%) were females. Population in the age range 0-6 years was 12. The total number of literate persons in Pirtand was 46 (68.66% of the population over 6 years). An adjacent village, Chirki, had a total population of 2,608, of which 1,211 (46%) were males and 1,397 (54%) were females. Population in the age range 0-6 years was 371. The total number of literate persons in Chirki was 1,724 (77.07% of the population over 6 years).

== Civic administration ==
=== Police station ===
Pirtand police station has jurisdiction over the Pirtand CD block. According to old British records, Pirtand PS was there after Giridh subdivision was formed in 1870.

=== CD Block HQ ===
The headquarters of the Pirtand CD block are located at Pirtand village.

== Transport ==
National Highway 114A, locally popular as Isri-Giridih Road, passes through Pirtand.
