= Parasnath railway station =

Railway station in Jharkhand, India

PARASNATH

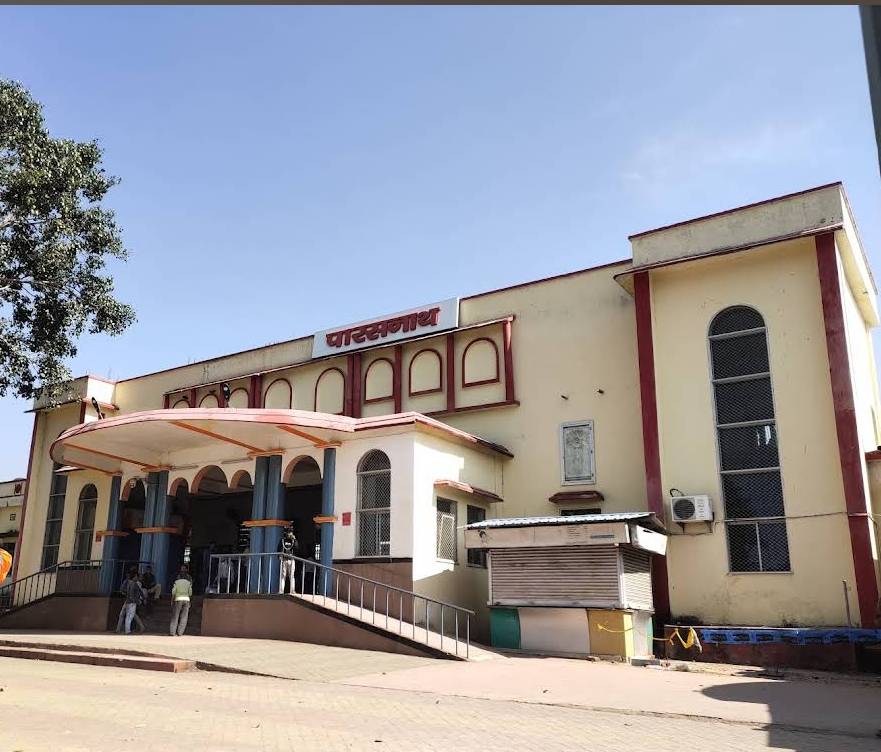
- Parasnath railway station

General information
- Location: Isri, Giridih, Jharkhand; India
- Coordinates: 23°59′16″N 86°02′15″E
- Elevation: 278 metres (912 ft)
- System: Indian Railways station
- Owner: Indian Railways
- Operator: East Central Railway
- Lines: Asansol–Gaya section of Howrah–Gaya–Delhi line; Howrah–Allahabad–Mumbai line
- Platforms: 5

Construction
- Structure type: Standard on ground station
- Parking: Yes
- Accessible: Available

Other information
- Status: Active
- Station code: PNME
- Division(s): Dhanbad
- Classification: NSG-3

History
- Opened: 1906
- Electrified: 1961–62
- Former names: East Indian Railway
Route map
Location

Parasnath railway station (station code: PNME), is a railway station located in Isri in the Giridih district of the Indian state of Jharkhand. It lies on the Asansol–Gaya section of the Grand Chord and comes under the Dhanbad railway division of the East Central Railway of Indian Railways. The station serves the town of Isri and provides rail connectivity to Parasnath Hill or Shikharji, the highest peak in Jharkhand with an elevation of 1,365 metres (4,478 feet) which is also one of the most important Jain pilgrimage sites in India.

There are plans from the Railway ministry to connect Parasnath with New Giridih via Madhuban, for the convenience of the Jain pilgrims visiting Shikharji. Construction of which was sanctioned and the project included in the Union Budget 2018-19 at a cost of ₹902.86 crore (US$94 million) on a 50:50 cost sharing basis between the Government of Jharkhand and Indian Railways. The foundation stone for construction was laid in 2019. The 49-km long railway line will have two crossing stations and a couple of halts. During the financial year 2022–23, Indian Railways had allotted ₹50 Crores for the above project for early starting of the project. In a land acquisition application submitted to DLAO/Giridih by DyCE/Con/HZME office, ₹78.27 Crores were demanded for Raiyati land of 26 villages and payment for land acquisition is yet awaited for deposition of fund from Government of Jharkhand.

== Electrification ==
The Gomoh–Koderma sector was electrified in 1961–62.

== Shikharji ==
Shikarji is a holy place with innumerable temples, shrines, and meditation halls surrounded by natural scenery and wildlife.

There are two recognized routes to the summit of Parasnath Hill. Itcan be reached either from the southern side or the northern side.

The southern approach is from Isri Bazaar or Nimiaghat. This route is motorable for about 2 km (1.2 mi), with the rest being a climb of 8 km (5.0 mi).

The northern approach is a 13 km (8.1 mi) route from Madhuban on the Dumri-Giridih road. Madhuban is about 40 km (25 mi) from Giridih and about 10 km (6.2 mi) from Parasnath Railway Station / Isri Bazaar / Dumri, all on Grand Trunk Road (NH 2). Buses ply along this route from Dumri to Giridih and stop at Madhuban village. Hired cars or taxis are available at Isri Bazar, just outside the rail station. There are several Jain temples at Madhuban. There is a metalled trek route of 9 km (5.6 mi) to the summit, a major part of which is motorable.

Both the Shwetambaras and Digambaras have established Dharamshalas or Ashrams here to accommodate pilgrims from all over the world.

== Gallery ==
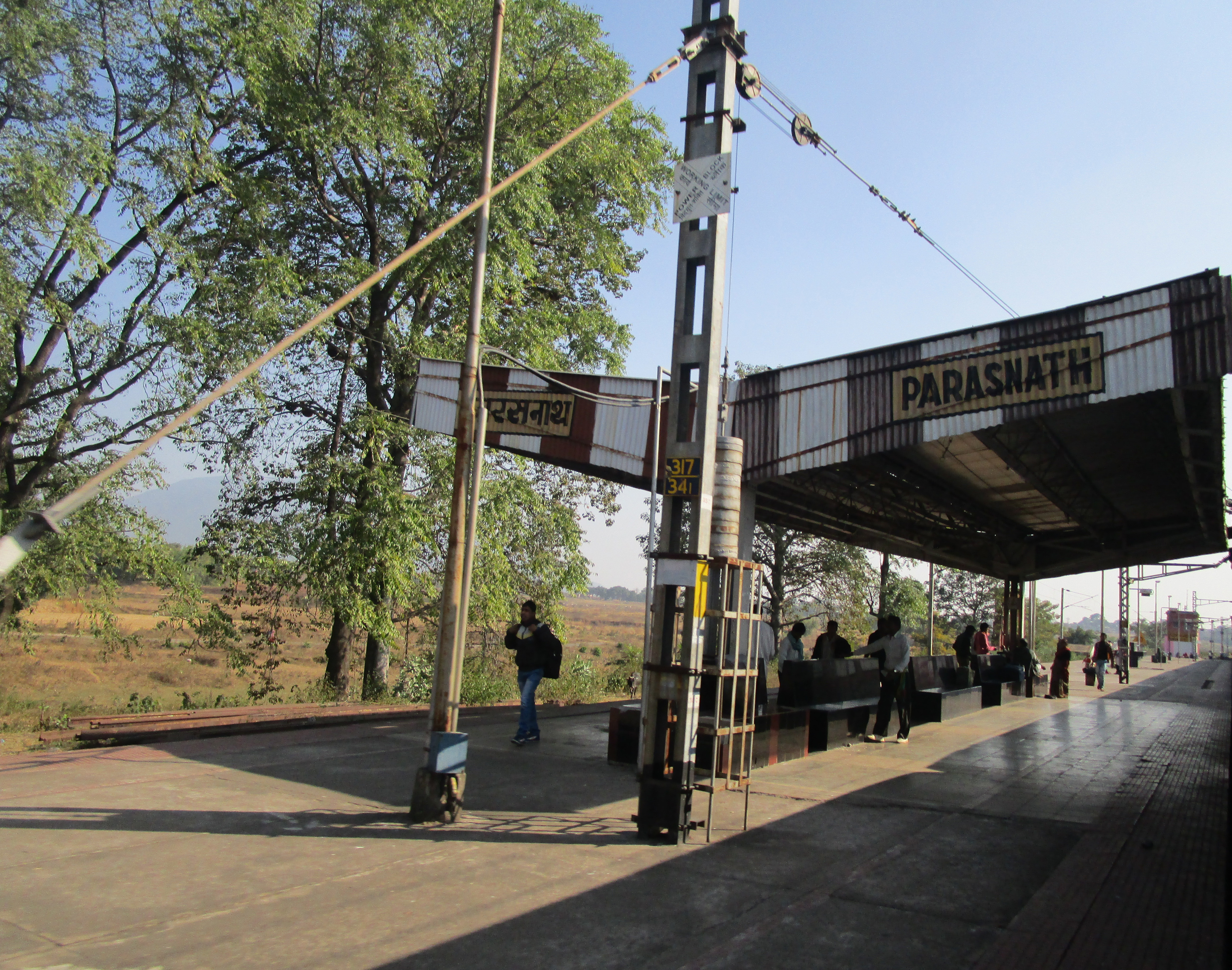
Railway station platform

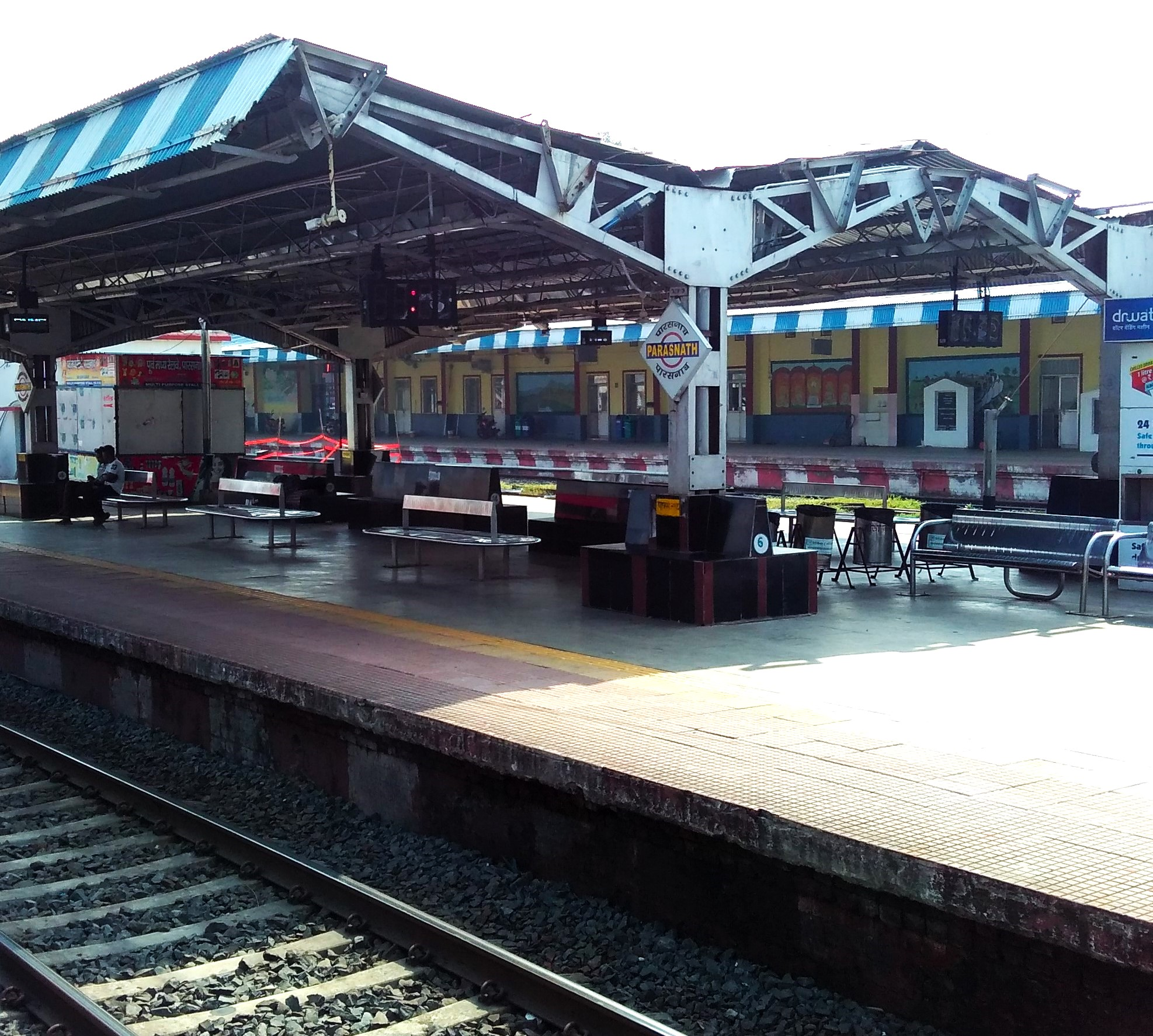
Railway station platform

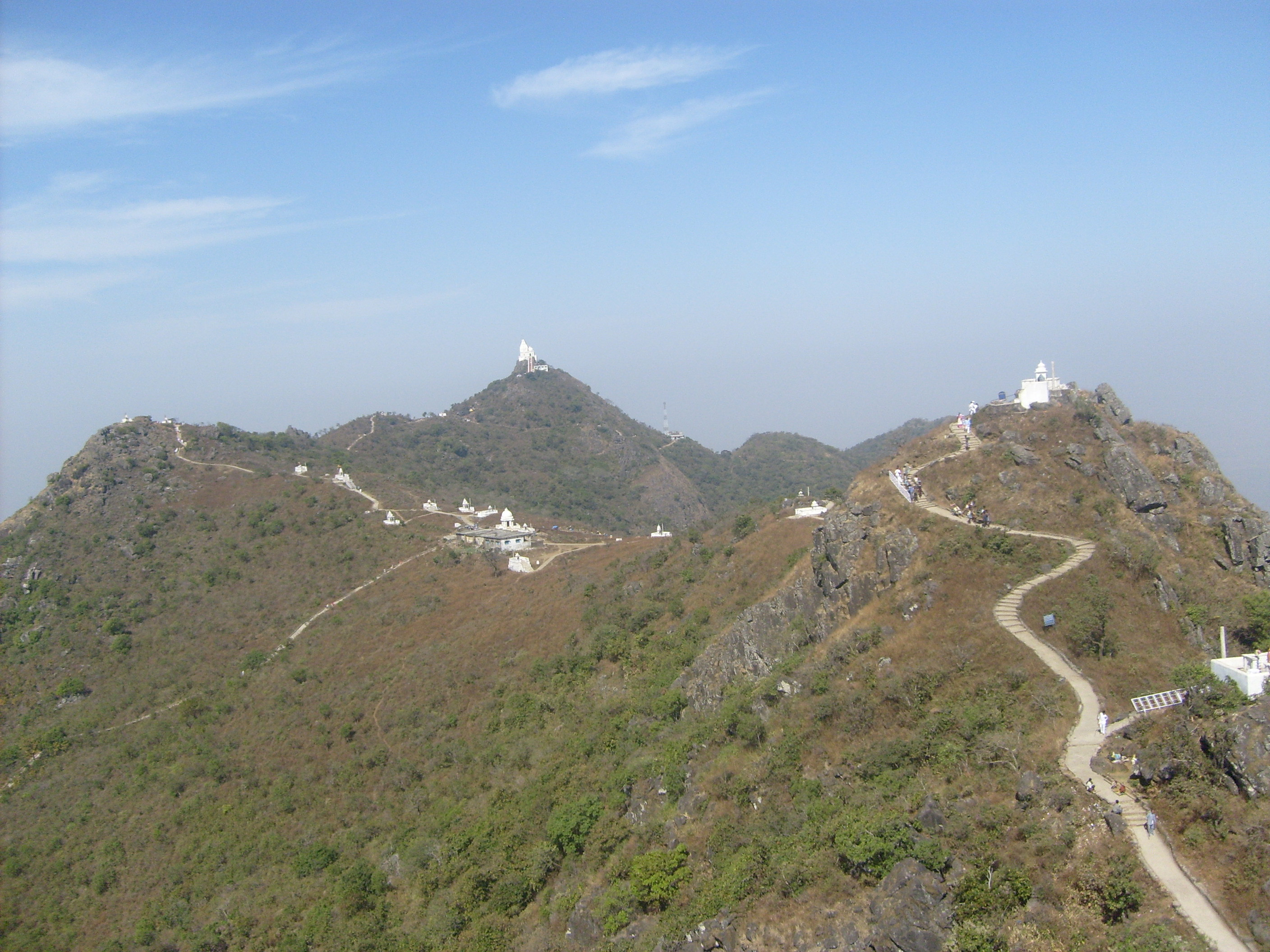
Jain temples on Shikharji or Parasnath Hills

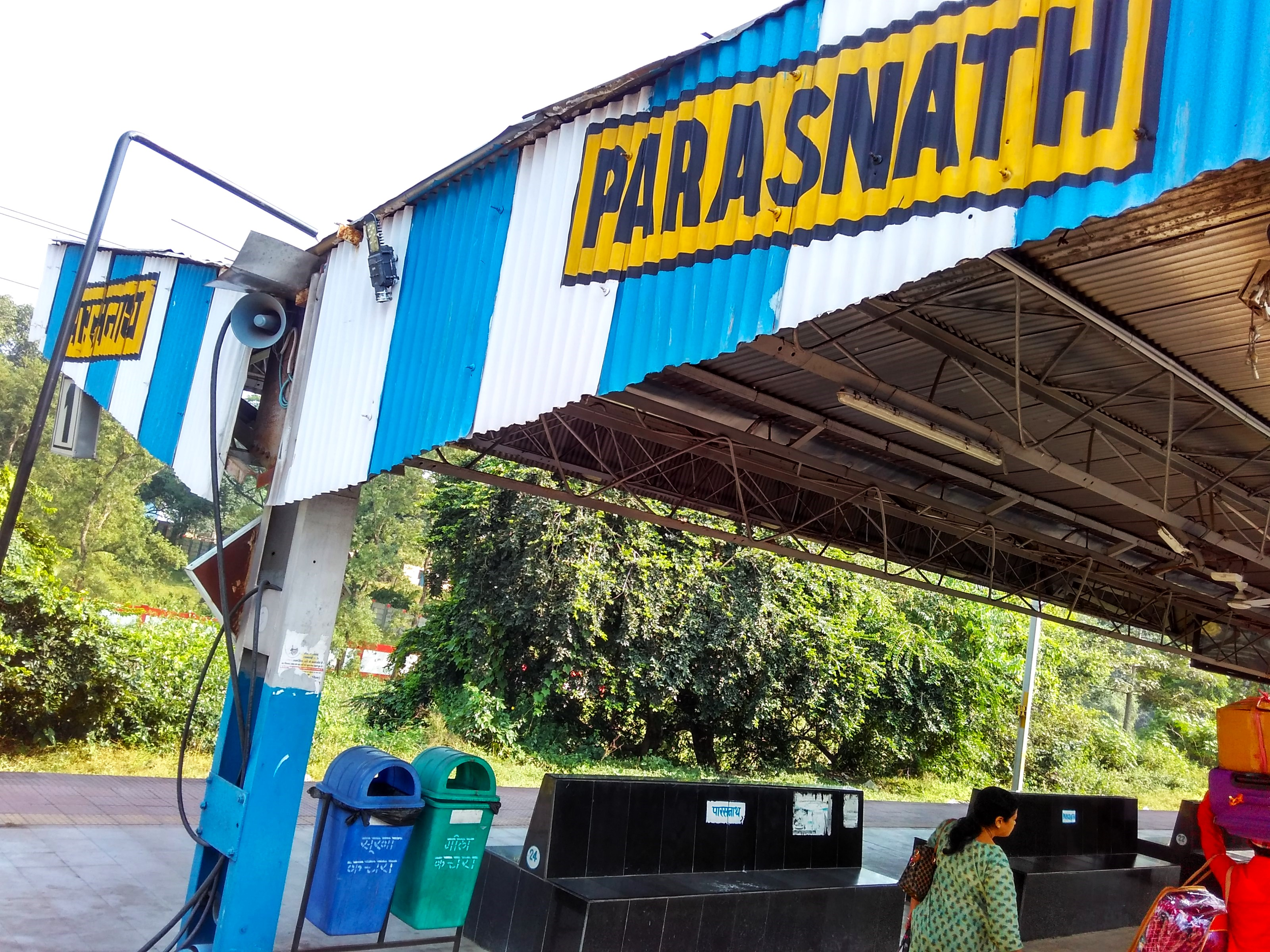
Parasnath railway station, Jharkhand

== See also ==
- Shikharji
- Parasnath
- Isri
- Giridih railway station
- New Giridih railway station
- Giridih district

Preceding station	Indian Railways	Following station
Nimiaghat towards ?	East Central Railway zone Asansol–Gaya section	Choudhurybandh towards ?
