= Sariya (community development block) =

Sariya Ṣariyā Suriya
- Community Development Block
- Location in Giridih District
- Interactive map of Sariya
- Coordinates: 24°10′27.7″N 85°53′29.5″E
- Country: India
- State: Jharkhand
- District: Giridih
- Subdivision: Bagodar-Saria
- Headquarters: Sariya
- Panchayat: 23 (9th)

Government
  - Type: Federal democracy
  - Block Development Officer: Lalit Narayan Tiwari
  - Circle Officer: Santosh Kumar

Area
  - Total: 193.40 km^{2} (74.67 sq mi)
  - Rank: 13th
- Elevation: 308 m (1,010 ft)

Population (2011)
  - Total: 149,068
  - Rank: 9th
  - Density: 770.78/km^{2} (1,996.3/sq mi)
  - Rank: 2nd

Languages
  - Official: Hindi, Urdu
- Time zone: UTC+5:30 (IST)
- PIN: 825320 (Sariya)
- Telephone/STD code: 06557
- Vehicle registration: JH-11
- Panchayats: 23
- Lok Sabha constituency: Kodarma
- Vidhan Sabha constituency: Bagodar
- Literacy: 66.25%
- Sex Ratio: 943
- Website: giridih.nic.in

Sariya Mahraj Mathur is a community development block (CD block) that forms an administrative division in the Bagodar-Saria subdivision of the Giridih district in the Indian state of Jharkhand.

== Overview ==
Giridih is a plateau region. The western portion of the district is part of a larger central plateau. The rest of the district is a lower plateau, a flat table land with an elevation of about 1,300 feet. At the edges, the ghats drop to about 700 feet. The Pareshnath Hills or Shikharji rises to a height of 4,480 feet in the south-eastern part of the district. The district is thickly forested. Amongst the natural resources, it has coal and mica. Inaugurating the Pradhan Mantri Ujjwala Yojana in 2016, Raghubar Das, Chief Minister of Jharkhand, had indicated that there were 23 lakh BPL families in Jharkhand. There was a plan to bring the BPL proportion in the total population down to 35%.

== Maoist activities ==
Jharkhand is one of the states affected by Maoist activities. As of 2012, Giridih was one of the 14 highly affected districts in the state.As of 2016, Giridih was identified as one of the 13 focus areas by the state police to check Maoist activities. In 2017, the Maoists, in Giridih district, have torched more than 50 vehicles engaged in road construction or carrying goods.

== Geography ==
Sariya CD block is bounded by Birni CD block on the north, Dumri CD block on the east, Bagodar CD block on the south and Chalkusha CD block, in Hazaribagh district, on the west.

Sariya CD block has an area of 193.40 km^{2}. It has 23 gram panchayats, 67 inhabited villages and 1 census town. Suriya police station serves this block. Headquarters of this CD Block is at Suriya. n/a % of the area has forest cover.

Barakar River flows through this block.

Gram panchayats in Sariya CD block are: Parsiya, Amnari, Ghutiyapesra, Koerdih, Purnidih, Mokamo, Kailatand, Nagar Keshwari, Keshwari, Barwadih, Sablpur, Bagodih, Nawadih, Sariya (N), Sariya (E), Sariya (W), Sariya Khurd, Mandramo (E), Mandramo (W), Chirua, Chichaki, Kusmadih, and Bandkharo.

== Demographics ==
=== Population ===
According to the 2011 Census of India, Sariya CD block had a total population of 149,068, of which 130,135 were rural and 18,993 were urban. There were 76,936 (52%) males and 72,132 (48%) females. Population in the age range 0–6 years was 27,583. Scheduled Castes numbered 18,097 (12.14%) and Scheduled Tribes numbered 4,355 (2.92%).

The only census town in Sariya CD block is (2011 census population figure in brackets): Barki Sarayia (18,933).

Large villages (with 4,000+ population) in Sariya CD block are (2011 census figures in brackets): Amnari (4,023), Nagar Keswari (4,841), Keshwai (9,625), Saria Khurd (5,156), Sabalpur (5,179), Bagodih (5,955), Nawadih (4,048) and Mandramo (11,558).

=== Literacy ===
As of 2011 census the total number of literate persons in Sariya CD block was 80,489 (66.25% of the population over 6 years) out of which males numbered 50,520 (70.04% of the male population over 6 years) and females numbered 29,969 (50.72% of the female population over 6 years). The gender disparity (the difference between female and male literacy rates) was 19.32%.

As of 2011 census, literacy in Giridih district was 63.14% Literacy in Jharkhand was 66.41% in 2011. Literacy in India in 2011 was 74.04%.

See also – List of Jharkhand districts ranked by literacy rate

Literacy in CD Blocks of
Giridih district
Giridih subdivision
Giridih - 63.22%
Gandey - 56.30%
Bengabad - 59.33%
Dumri subdivision
Dumri - 63.55%
Pirtand - 47.22%
Bagodar Saria subdivision
Bagodar - 64.43%
Suriya - 66.25%
Birni - 61.47%
Khori Mahua subdivision
Dhanwar - 65.44%
Jamua - 63.99%
Deori - 62.54%
Tisri - 55.27%
Gawan - 60.94 %
Source: 2011 Census: CD Block Wise
Primary Census Abstract Data

=== Language and religion ===
Religions in Sariya CD block (2011)
Religion	Percent
Hinduism	85.35%
Islam	14.32%
Other or not stated	0.33%

Languages of Sariya CD block (2011)
1. Khortha (75.2%)
2. Hindi (9.41%)
3. Kurmali (9.20%)
4. Urdu (2.92%)
5. Santali (2.50%)
6. Others (0.73%)

Khortha is the main spoken language. Hindi is the official language. Urdu and Santali are also spoken.

== Rural poverty ==
40-50% of the population of Giridih district were in the BPL category in 2004–2005, being in the same category as Godda, Koderma and Hazaribagh districts. Rural poverty in Jharkhand declined from 66% in 1993–94 to 46% in 2004–05. In 2011, it has come down to 39.1%.

== Economy ==
=== Livelihood ===
Livelihood
in Sariya CD block
1. Cultivators (53.2%)
2. Agricultural labourers (21.6%)
3. Household industries (2.20%)
4. Other Workers (23.0%)

In Sariya CD block in 2011, amongst the class of total workers, cultivators numbered 38,058 and formed 53.23%, agricultural labourers numbered 15,440 and formed 21.60%, household industry workers numbered 1,572 and formed 2.20% and other workers numbered 16,427 and formed 22.98%. Total workers numbered 71,497 and formed 47.96% of the total population, and non-workers numbered 77,571 and formed 52.04% of the population.

Note: In the census records a person is considered a cultivator, if the person is engaged in cultivation/ supervision of land owned. When a person who works on another person's land for wages in cash or kind or share, is regarded as an agricultural labourer. Household industry is defined as an industry conducted by one or more members of the family within the household or village, and one that does not qualify for registration as a factory under the Factories Act. Other workers are persons engaged in some economic activity other than cultivators, agricultural labourers and household workers. It includes factory, mining, plantation, transport and office workers, those engaged in business and commerce, teachers, entertainment artistes and so on.

=== Infrastructure ===
There are 67 inhabited villages in Sariya CD block. In 2011, 16 villages had power supply. 2 villages had tap water (treated/ untreated), 65 villages had well water (covered/ uncovered), 58 villages had hand pumps, and all villages had drinking water facility. 13 villages had post offices, 3 villages had a sub post office, 3 villages had telephones (land lines) and 23 villages had mobile phone coverage. 65 villages had pucca (paved) village roads, 6 villages had bus service (public/ private), 3 villages had autos/ modified autos, and 32 villages had tractors. 3 villages had bank branches, 3 villages had agricultural credit societies, no village had cinema/ video hall, 3 villages had public library and public reading room. 25 villages had public distribution system, 8 villages had weekly haat (market) and 24 villages had assembly polling stations.

=== Agriculture ===
Hills occupy a large portion of Giridih district. The soil is generally rocky and sandy and that helps jungles and bushes to grow. The forest area, forming a large portion of total area, in the district is evenly distributed all over. Some areas near the rivers have alluvial soil. In Sariya CD block, the percentage of cultivable area to total area is 22.38%. The percentage of cultivable area to the total area for the district, as a whole, is 27.04%. Irrigation is inadequate. The percentage of irrigated area to cultivable area in Sariya CD block is 6.52%. May to October is the Kharif season, followed by the Rabi season. Rice, sown in 50% of the gross sown area, is the main crop in the district. Other important crops grown are: maize, wheat, sugar cane, pulses and vegetables.

=== Backward Regions Grant Fund ===
Giridih district is listed as a backward region and receives financial support from the Backward Regions Grant Fund. The fund created by the Government of India is designed to redress regional imbalances in development. As of 2012, 272 districts across the country were listed under this scheme. The list includes 21 districts of Jharkhand.

== Transport ==
There is a road linking Hazaribagh Road station at Suriya to Hazaribagh. It passes through Bagodar on NH 19 (old NH 2) / Grand Trunk Road. Suriya-Rajdhanwar Road connects Suriya to Rajdhanwar and Khori Mahua on State Highway 13 (Jharkhand), running from Koderma to Gobindpur. Suriya-Parasiya Road links to the Keshwari-Chaube-Markacho Road.

The Asansol-Gaya section, a part of the Grand Chord, Howrah-Gaya-Delhi line and Howrah-Allahabad-Mumbai line, passes through this block. Hazaribagh Road railway station is on this line.

== Education ==
Sariya CD block had 24 villages with pre-primary schools, 63 villages with primary schools, 41 villages with middle schools, 9 villages with secondary schools, 2 villages with no educational facility.
.*Senior secondary schools are also known as Inter colleges in Jharkhand

- Sariya College was established at Suriya in 1984. It is affiliated with Vinoba Bhave University and offers courses in arts and commerce.

== Healthcare ==
Sariya CD block had 1 village with community health centre, 10 villages with primary health subcentres, 8 villages with family welfare centres, 6 villages with medicine shops.
.*Private medical practitioners, alternative medicine etc. not included
