= Birni block =

Birni Birnī
- Community Development Block
- Interactive map of Birni
- Coordinates: 24°16′28″N 85°55′31″E
- Country: India
- State: Jharkhand
- District: Giridih
- Subdivision: Bagodar-Saria
- Headquarters: Birni
- Panchayat: 28 (5th)

Government
  - Type: Federal democracy
  - Block Development Officer: Fanishwar Rajwar
  - Circle Officer: Sandeep Kumar Madheshiya

Area
  - Total: 319.94 km^{2} (123.53 sq mi)
  - Rank: 12th
- Elevation: 607 m (1,991 ft)

Population (2011)
  - Total: 169,451
  - Rank: 7th
  - Density: 529.63/km^{2} (1,371.7/sq mi)
  - Rank: 5th

Languages
  - Official: Hindi, Urdu
- Time zone: UTC+5:30 (IST)
- PIN: 825324 (Bangrakala)
- Telephone/STD code: 06554
- Vehicle registration: JH-11
- Lok Sabha constituency: Kodarma, Giridih
- Vidhan Sabha constituency: Bagodar, Dhanwar, Giridih
- Literacy: 61.47%
- Sex Ratio: 971
- Website: giridih.nic.in

Birni (Hindi: Birnī, pronounced [bɪɾni:]) is a community development block (CD block) that forms an administrative division in the Bagodar-Saria subdivision of the Giridih district in the Indian state of Jharkhand.

== Overview ==
Giridih is a plateau region. The western portion of the district is part of a larger central plateau. The rest of the district is a lower plateau, a flat table land with an elevation of about 1,300 feet. At the edges, the ghats drop to about 700 feet. The Pareshnath Hills or Shikharji rises to a height of 4,480 feet in the south-eastern part of the district. The district is thickly forested. Amongst the natural resources, it has coal and mica. Inaugurating the Pradhan Mantri Ujjwala Yojana in 2016, Raghubar Das, Chief Minister of Jharkhand, had indicated that there were 23 lakh BPL families in Jharkhand. There was a plan to bring the BPL proportion in the total population down to 35%.

== Maoist activities ==
Jharkhand is one of the states affected by Maoist activities. As of 2012, Giridih was one of the 14 highly affected districts in the state. As of 2016, Giridih was identified as one of the 13 focus areas by the state police to check Maoist activities. In 2017, the Moists, in Giridih district, have torched more than 50 vehicles engaged in road construction or carrying goods.

== Geography ==
Birni is located at 24°16′28″N 85°55′31″E.

Birni CD block is bounded by Dhanwar and Jamua CD blocks on the north, Giridih CD block on the east, Dumri and Suriya CD blocks on the south and Markacho CD block, in Koderma district, on the west.

Birni CD block has an area of 319.94 km^{2}. It has 28 gram panchayats, 172 inhabited villages. Birni police station serves this block. Headquarters of this CD block is at Birni. 14.74% of the area has forest cover.

Rivers in Birni CD block are Barakar, Irga and Bhutaha.

Gram panchayats in Birni CD block are: Padariya, Kapilo, Bangra Kala, Dalangi, Makhmargo, Birni, Tetariya Salaiya, Simra Dhab, Barmasiya, Arari, Jaridih, Kendua, Khairidih, Kharkhari, Shakhawara, Manjhiladih, Barwadih, Kusmai, Tulsitand, Gadi, Pesham, Chongakhar, Padarmaniya, Baliya, Manakdiha, Balgo, Khedwara and Keshodih.

== Demographics ==
=== Population ===
According to the 2011 Census of India, Birni CD block had a total population of 169,451, all of which were rural. There were 85,970 (51%) males and 83,481 (49%) females. Population in the age range 0–6 years was 32,912. Scheduled Castes numbered 25,853 (15.26%) and Scheduled Tribes numbered 2,475 (1.46%).

=== Literacy ===
As of 2011 census the total number of literate persons in Birni CD block was 83,928 (63.22% of the population over 6 years) out of which males numbered 53,591 (77.54% of the male population over 6 years) and females numbered 30,337 (45,00% of the female population over 6 years). The gender disparity (the difference between female and male literacy rates) was 32.54%.

As of 2011 census, literacy in Giridih district was 63.14% Literacy in Jharkhand was 66.41% in 2011. Literacy in India in 2011 was 74.04%.

See also – List of Jharkhand districts ranked by literacy rate

Literacy in CD Blocks of
Giridih district
Giridih subdivision
Giridih - 63.22%
Gandey - 56.30%
Bengabad - 59.33%
Dumri subdivision
Dumri - 63.55%
Pirtand - 47.22%
Bagodar Saria subdivision
Bagodar - 64.43%
Suriya - 66.25%
Birni - 61.47%
Khori Mahua subdivision
Dhanwar - 65.44%
Jamua - 63.99%
Deori - 62.54%
Tisri - 55.27%
Gawan - 60.94 %
Source: 2011 Census: CD Block Wise
Primary Census Abstract Data

=== Language and religion ===
Religions in Birni CD block (2011)
Religion	Percent
Hinduism	77.59%
Islam	22.07%
Other or not stated	0.34%

Languages of Birni CD block (2011)
1. Khortha (91.6%)
2. Hindi (4.47%)
3. Urdu (2.81%)
4. Santali (1.09%)
5. Others (0.04%)

Khortha is the main spoken language. Hindi is the official language. Urdu and Santali are also spoken.

== Rural poverty ==
40-50% of the population of Giridih district were in the BPL category in 2004–2005, being in the same category as Godda, Koderma and Hazaribagh districts. Rural poverty in Jharkhand declined from 66% in 1993–94 to 46% in 2004–05. In 2011, it has come down to 39.1%.

== Economy ==
=== Livelihood ===
Livelihood
in Birni CD block
1. Cultivators (45.8%)
2. Agricultural labourers (27.3%)
3. Household industries (2.39%)
4. Other Workers (24.5%)

In Birni CD block in 2011, amongst the class of total workers, cultivators numbered 34,044 and formed 45.82%, agricultural labourers numbered 20,281 and formed 27.30%, household industry workers numbered 1,774 and formed 2.39% and other workers numbered 18,199 and formed 24.49%. Total workers numbered 74,298 and formed 43.85% of the total population, and non-workers numbered 95,153 and formed 56.15% of the population.

Note: In the census records a person is considered a cultivator, if the person is engaged in cultivation/ supervision of land owned. When a person who works on another person's land for wages in cash or kind or share, is regarded as an agricultural labourer. Household industry is defined as an industry conducted by one or more members of the family within the household or village, and one that does not qualify for registration as a factory under the Factories Act. Other workers are persons engaged in some economic activity other than cultivators, agricultural labourers and household workers. It includes factory, mining, plantation, transport and office workers, those engaged in business and commerce, teachers, entertainment artistes and so on.

=== Infrastructure ===
There are 172 inhabited villages in Birni CD block. In 2011, 29 villages had power supply. No village had tap water (treated/ untreated), 168 villages had well water (covered/ uncovered), 163 villages had hand pumps, and all villages had drinking water facility. 26 villages had post offices, 5 villages had a sub post office, 11 villages had telephones (land lines) and 135 villages had mobile phone coverage. 171 villages had pucca (paved) village roads, 27 villages had bus service (public/ private), 30 villages had autos/ modified autos, and 102 villages had tractors. 17 villages had bank branches, 4 villages had agricultural credit societies, no village had cinema/ video halls, no village had public library and public reading room. 72 villages had public distribution system, 16 villages had weekly haat (market) and 81 villages had assembly polling stations.

=== Agriculture ===
Hills occupy a large portion of Giridih district. The soil is generally rocky and sandy and that helps jungles and bushes to grow. The forest area, forming a large portion of total area, in the district is evenly distributed all over. Some areas near the rivers have alluvial soil. In Birni CD block, the percentage of cultivable area to total area is 22.96%. The percentage of cultivable area to the total area for the district, as a whole, is 27.04%. Irrigation is inadequate. The percentage of irrigated area to cultivable area in Birni CD block is 11.01%. May to October is the Kharif season, followed by the Rabi season. Rice, sown in 50% of the gross sown area, is the main crop in the district. Other important crops grown are: maize, wheat, sugar cane, pulses and vegetables.

=== Mica mining ===
Mica is mined in Birni CD block.

=== Backward Regions Grant Fund ===
Giridih district is listed as a backward region and receives financial support from the Backward Regions Grant Fund. The fund created by the Government of India is designed to redress regional imbalances in development. As of 2012, 272 districts across the country were listed under this scheme. The list includes 21 districts of Jharkhand.

== Transport ==
Birni is on Suriya-Rajdhanwar Road.

== Education ==
Birni CD block had 24 villages with pre-primary schools, 156 villages with primary schools, 85 villages with middle schools, 13 villages with secondary schools, 9 villages with senior secondary schools, 15 villages with no educational facility.
.*Senior secondary schools are also known as Inter colleges in Jharkhand

== Healthcare ==
Birni CD block had 1 village with community health centre, 1 village with primary health centre, 14 villages with primary health subcentres, 3 villages with maternity and child welfare centres, 3 villages with allopathic hospitals, 9 villages with dispensaries, 2 villages with veterinary hospitals, 1 village with family welfare centre, 16 villages with medicine shops.
.*Private medical practitioners, alternative medicine etc. not included
