= Gawan block =

Gawan Gāwāṅ
- Community Development Block
- Location in Giridih District
- Interactive map of Gawan
- Coordinates: 24°37′06″N 85°56′51″E
- Country: India
- State: Jharkhand
- District: Giridih
- Subdivision: Khori Mahuwa
- Headquarters: Gawan
- Panchayat: 17 (11th)

Government
  - Type: Federal democracy
  - Block Development Officer: Mahendra Ravidas
  - Circle Officer: Avinash Ranjan

Area
  - Total: 336.75 km^{2} (130.02 sq mi)
  - Rank: 11th
- Elevation: 346 m (1,135 ft)

Population (2011)
  - Total: 115,962
  - Rank: 11th
  - Density: 344.36/km^{2} (891.88/sq mi)
  - Rank: 11th

Languages
  - Official: Hindi, Urdu
- Time zone: UTC+5:30 (IST)
- PIN: 815313 (Gawan)
- Telephone/STD code: 06556
- Vehicle registration: JH-11
- Lok Sabha constituency: Kodarma
- Vidhan Sabha constituency: Dhanwar
- Literacy: 60.94%
- Sex Ratio: 964
- Website: giridih.nic.in

Gawan block is a community development block (CD block) that forms an administrative division in the Khuri Mahua subdivision of the Giridih district in the Indian state of Jharkhand.

== Overview ==
Giridih is a plateau region. The western portion of the district is part of a larger central plateau. The rest of the district is a lower plateau, a flat table land with an elevation of about 1,300 feet. At the edges, the ghats drop to about 700 feet. The Pareshnath Hill or Shikharji rises to a height of 4,480 feet in the south-eastern part of the district. The district is thickly forested. Amongst the natural resources, it has coal and mica. Inaugurating the Pradhan Mantri Ujjwala Yojana in 2016, Raghubar Das, Chief Minister of Jharkhand, had indicated that there were 23 lakh BPL families in Jharkhand. There was a plan to bring the BPL proportion in the total population down to 35%.

== Maoist activities ==
Jharkhand is one of the states affected by Maoist activities. As of 2012, Giridih was one of the 14 highly affected districts in the state.As of 2016, Giridih was identified as one of the 13 focus areas by the state police to check Maoist activities. In 2017, the Moists, in Giridih district, have torched more than 50 vehicles engaged in road construction or carrying goods.

== Geography ==
Gawan is located at 24°37′06″N 85°56′51″E.

Gawan CD block is bounded by Kawakole CD block, in Nawada district of Bihar, on the north, Tisri CD block on the east, Dhanwar CD block on the south and Satgawan CD block, in Koderma district, on the west.

Gawan CD block has an area of 336.76 km^{2}. It has 17 gram panchayats, and 137 inhabited villages. Gawan police station serves this block. Headquarters of this CD block is at Gawan. 48.59% of the area has forest cover.

Rivers in Gawan CD block are: Sankh, Barki, Chakli, Sakri and Likhar.

Gram panchayats in Gawan CD block are: Pasnour, Manjhne, Birne, Amtaro, Gawan, Serua, Sankh, Patna, Badidih, Malda, Nagwan, Gadar, Kharsan, Pihara (E), Pihara (W), Nimadih and Jamdar.

== Demographics ==
=== Population ===
According to the 2011 Census of India, Gawan CD block had a total population of 115,962, all of which were rural. There were 59,039 (51%) males and 56,923 (49%) females. Population in the age range 0–6 years was 22,682. Scheduled Castes numbered 18,913 (16.31%) and Scheduled Tribes numbered 5,295 (4.57%).

=== Literacy ===
As of 2011 census the total number of literate persons in Gawan CD block was 56,848 (60.94% of the population over 6 years) out of which males numbered 35,581 (75.10% of the male population over 6 years) and females numbered 21,267 (46.33% of the female population over 6 years). The gender disparity (the difference between female and male literacy rates) was 28.77%.

As of 2011 census, literacy in Giridih district was 63.14% Literacy in Jharkhand was 66.41% in 2011. Literacy in India in 2011 was 74.04%.

See also – List of Jharkhand districts ranked by literacy rate

Literacy in CD Blocks of
Giridih district
Giridih subdivision
Giridih - 63.22%
Gandey - 56.30%
Bengabad - 59.33%
Dumri subdivision
Dumri - 63.55%
Pirtand - 47.22%
Bagodar Saria subdivision
Bagodar - 64.43%
Suriya - 66.25%
Birni - 61.47%
Khori Mahua subdivision
Dhanwar - 65.44%
Jamua - 63.99%
Deori - 62.54%
Tisri - 55.27%
Gawan - 60.94 %
Source: 2011 Census: CD Block Wise
Primary Census Abstract Data

=== Language and religion ===
Religions in Gawan CD block (2011)
Religion	Percent
Hinduism	80.60%
Islam	18.85%
Other or not stated	0.55%
*mainly tribal religions like Sarna

Languages of Gawan block (2011)
1. Khortha (58.7%)
2. Hindi (30.9%)
3. Urdu (5.63%)
4. Santali (4.31%)
5. Others (0.49%)

Khortha is the main spoken language. Hindi is the official language. Urdu and Santali are also spoken.

== Rural poverty ==
40-50% of the population of Giridih district were in the BPL category in 2004–2005, being in the same category as Godda, Koderma and Hazaribagh districts. Rural poverty in Jharkhand declined from 66% in 1993–94 to 46% in 2004–05. In 2011, it has come down to 39.1%.

== Economy ==
=== Livelihood ===
Livelihood
in Gawan CD block
1. Cultivators (39.2%)
2. Agricultural labourers (35.2%)
3. Household industries (2.81%)
4. Other Workers (22.8%)

In Gawan CD block in 2011, amongst the class of total workers, cultivators numbered 18,748 and formed 39.23%, agricultural labourers numbered 16,806 and formed 35.17%, household industry workers numbered 1,342 and formed 2.81% and other workers numbered 10,890 and formed 22.79%. Total workers numbered 47,786 and formed 41.21% of the total population, and non-workers numbered 68,186 and formed 58.79% of the population.

Note: In the census records a person is considered a cultivator, if the person is engaged in cultivation/ supervision of land owned. When a person who works on another person's land for wages in cash or kind or share, is regarded as an agricultural labourer. Household industry is defined as an industry conducted by one or more members of the family within the household or village, and one that does not qualify for registration as a factory under the Factories Act. Other workers are persons engaged in some economic activity other than cultivators, agricultural labourers and household workers. It includes factory, mining, plantation, transport and office workers, those engaged in business and commerce, teachers, entertainment artistes and so on.

=== Infrastructure ===
There are 137 inhabited villages in Gawan CD block. In 2011, 55 villages had power supply. No village had tap water (treated/ untreated), 133 villages had well water (covered/ uncovered), 129 villages had hand pumps, and all villages had drinking water facility. 16 villages had post offices, 10 villages had a sub post office, 3 villages had telephones (land lines) and 50 villages had mobile phone coverage. 135 villages had pucca (paved) village roads, 45 villages had bus service (public/ private), 34 villages had autos/ modified autos, and 90 villages had tractors. 11 villages had bank branches, 3 villages had agricultural credit societies, 1 village had cinema/ video halls, 1 village had public library and public reading room. 41 villages had public distribution system, 5 villages had weekly haat (market) and 49 villages had assembly polling stations.

=== Agriculture ===
Hills occupy a large portion of Giridih district. The soil is generally rocky and sandy and that helps jungles and bushes to grow. The forest area, forming a large portion of total area, in the district is evenly distributed all over. Some areas near the rivers have alluvial soil. In Gawan CD block, the percentage of cultivable area to total area is 17.24%. It is the lowest amongst all the CD blocks in the district. The percentage of cultivable area to the total area for the district as a whole is 27.04%. Irrigation is inadequate. The percentage of irrigated area to cultivable area in Gawan CD block is 20.02%, the highest amongst all CD blocks in the district. May to October is the Kharif season, followed by the Rabi season. Rice, sown in 50% of the gross sown area, is the main crop in the district. Other important crops grown are: maize, wheat, sugar cane, pulses and vegetables.

=== Mica mines ===
Gawan and Tisri CD blocks have many mica mines.

=== Backward Regions Grant Fund ===
Giridih district is listed as a backward region and receives financial support from the Backward Regions Grant Fund. The fund created by the Government of India is designed to redress regional imbalances in development. As of 2012, 272 districts across the country were listed under this scheme. The list includes 21 districts of Jharkhand.

== Education ==
Gawan CD block had 17 villages with pre-primary schools, 114 villages with primary schools, 52 villages with middle schools, 6 villages with secondary schools, 2 villages with senior secondary schools, 22 villages with no educational facility.
.*Senior secondary schools are also known as Inter colleges in Jharkhand

== Healthcare ==
Gawan CD block had 1 village had community health centre, 1 village with primary health centre, 20 villages with primary health subcentres, 2 villages with maternity and child welfare centre, 2 villages with allopathic hospitals, 8 villages with dispensaries, 2 villages with veterinary hospitals, 2 villages with family welfare centres, 6 villages with medicine shops.
.*Private medical practitioners, alternative medicine etc. not included
