= Bengabad block =

Bengabad Beṅgābād
- Community Development Block
- Interactive map of Bengabad
- Coordinates: 24°18′6″N 86°21′39″E
- Country: India
- State: Jharkhand
- District: Giridih
- Subdivision: Giridih Sadar
- Headquarters: Bengabad
- Panchayat: 26 (7th)

Government
  - Type: Federal democracy
  - Block Development Officer: Sunil Kumar Murmu
  - Circle Officer: Priyanka Priydarshi

Area
  - Total: 402.50 km^{2} (155.41 sq mi)
  - Rank: 5th
- Elevation: 298 m (978 ft)

Population (2011)
  - Total: 153,198
  - Rank: 9th
  - Density: 380.62/km^{2} (985.79/sq mi)
  - Rank: 10th

Languages
  - Official: Hindi, Urdu
- Time zone: UTC+5:30 (IST)
- PIN: 815312 (Bengabad)
- Telephone/STD code: 06552
- Vehicle registration: JH-11
- Lok Sabha constituency: Kodarma
- Vidhan Sabha constituency: Gandey
- Literacy: 59.33%
- Sex Ratio: 939
- Website: giridih.nic.in

Bengabad (Hindi: Beṅgābād, pronounced [be:ŋga:ba:d]) is a community development block (CD block) that forms an administrative division in the Giridih Sadar subdivision of the Giridih district in the Indian state of Jharkhand.

== Overview ==
Giridih is a plateau region. The western portion of the district is part of a larger central plateau. The rest of the district is a lower plateau, a flat table land with an elevation of about 1,300 feet. At the edges, the ghats drop to about 700 feet. The Pareshnath Hills or Shikharji rises to a height of 4,480 feet in the south-eastern part of the district. The district is thickly forested. Amongst the natural resources, it has coal and mica. Inaugurating the Pradhan Mantri Ujjwala Yojana in 2016, Raghubar Das, Chief Minister of Jharkhand, had indicated that there were 23 lakh BPL families in Jharkhand. There was a plan to bring the BPL proportion in the total population down to 35%.

== Maoist activities ==
Jharkhand is one of the states affected by Maoist activities. As of 2012, Giridih was one of the 14 highly affected districts in the state.As of 2016, Giridih was identified as one of the 13 focus areas by the state police to check Maoist activities. In 2017, the Moists, in Giridih district, have torched more than 50 vehicles engaged in road construction or carrying goods.

== Geography ==
Bengabad is located at 24°18′6″N 86°21′39″E.

Bengabad CD block is bounded by Chakai CD block, in Jamui district of Bihar on the north, Madhupur CD block, in Deoghar district, on the east, Gandey and Giridih CD blocks on the south and Jamua CD block on the west.

Bengabad CD block has an area of 402.50 km^{2}. It has 26 gram panchayats, 231 inhabited villages. Bengabad police station serves this block. Headquarters of this CD block is at Bengabad. 28.16% of the area has forest cover.

Rivers in Bengabad CD block are Ghagha and Pathro.

Gram panchayats in Bengabad CD block are: Badwara, Golgo, Bhalkudar, Luppi, Genro, Chitmadih, Harila, Chhatki, Khargdiha, Badkitand, Ojhadih, Taratand, Telonari, Bengabad, Mahuar, Motileda, Sonbad, Karnpura, Bhandardih, Madhwadih, Fitkoriya, Tarajori, Manjori, Chapuadih, Jhalakdiha and Jaruadih.

== Demographics ==
=== Population ===
According to the 2011 Census of India, Bengabad CD block had a total population of 153,198, all of which were rural. There were 79,018 (52%) males and 74,180 (48%) females. Population in the age range 0–6 years was 30,080. Scheduled Castes numbered 22,107 (14.43%) and Scheduled Tribes numbered 27,028 (17.64%).

=== Literacy ===
As of 2011 census the total number of literate persons in Bengabad CD block was 73,041 (59.39% of the population over 6 years) out of which males numbered 46,618 (73.51% of the male population over 6 years) and females numbered 26,423 (44.26% of the female population over 6 years). The gender disparity (the difference between female and male literacy rates) was 29.25%.

As of 2011 census, literacy in Giridih district was 63.14% Literacy in Jharkhand was 66.41% in 2011. Literacy in India in 2011 was 74.04%.

See also – List of Jharkhand districts ranked by literacy rate

Literacy in CD Blocks of
Giridih district
Giridih subdivision
Giridih - 63.22%
Gandey - 56.30%
Bengabad - 59.33%
Dumri subdivision
Dumri - 63.55%
Pirtand - 47.22%
Bagodar Saria subdivision
Bagodar - 64.43%
Suriya - 66.25%
Birni - 61.47%
Khori Mahua subdivision
Dhanwar - 65.44%
Jamua - 63.99%
Deori - 62.54%
Tisri - 55.27%
Gawan - 60.94 %
Source: 2011 Census: CD Block Wise
Primary Census Abstract Data

=== Language and religion ===
Religions in Bengabad CD block (2011)
Religion	Percent
Hinduism	71.33%
Islam	18.42%
Other*	8.78%
Christianity	1.31%
Other or not stated	0.16%
*mainly tribal religions like Sarna

Languages of Bengabad CD block (2011)
1. Khortha (78.7%)
2. Santali (16.9%)
3. Urdu (3.21%)
4. Hindi (0.93%)
5. Others (0.27%)

Khortha is the main spoken language. Hindi is the official language. Urdu and Santali are also spoken.

== Rural poverty ==
40-50% of the population of Giridih district were in the BPL category in 2004–2005, being in the same category as Godda, Koderma and Hazaribagh districts. Rural poverty in Jharkhand declined from 66% in 1993–94 to 46% in 2004–05. In 2011, it has come down to 39.1%.

== Economy ==
=== Livelihood ===
Livelihood
in Bengabad CD block
1. Cultivators (42.7%)
2. Agricultural labourers (23.1%)
3. Household industries (5.11%)
4. Other Workers (29.1%)

In Bengabad CD block in 2011, amongst the class of total workers, cultivators numbered 35,557 and formed 42.67%, agricultural labourers numbered 19,273 and formed 23.13%, household industry workers numbered 4,255 and formed 5.11% and other workers numbered 24,253 and formed 29.10%. Total workers numbered 83,338 and formed 54.40% of the total population, and non-workers numbered 69,860 and formed 45.60% of the population.

Note: In the census records a person is considered a cultivator, if the person is engaged in cultivation/ supervision of land owned. When a person who works on another person's land for wages in cash or kind or share, is regarded as an agricultural labourer. Household industry is defined as an industry conducted by one or more members of the family within the household or village, and one that does not qualify for registration as a factory under the Factories Act. Other workers are persons engaged in some economic activity other than cultivators, agricultural labourers and household workers. It includes factory, mining, plantation, transport and office workers, those engaged in business and commerce, teachers, entertainment artistes and so on.

=== Infrastructure ===
There are 231 inhabited villages in Bengabad CD block. In 2011, 118 villages had power supply. 3 villages had tap water (treated/ untreated), 223 villages had well water (covered/ uncovered), 227 villages had hand pumps, and all villages had drinking water facility. 21 villages had post offices, 13 villages had a sub post office, 9 villages had telephones (land lines) and 149 villages had mobile phone coverage. 221 villages had pucca (paved) village roads, 30 villages had bus service (public/ private), 21 villages had autos/ modified autos, and 39 villages had tractors. 16 villages had bank branches, 5 villages had agricultural credit societies, 1 village had cinema/ video hall, 1 village had public library and public reading room. 31 villages had public distribution system, 9 villages had weekly haat (market) and 81 villages had assembly polling stations.

=== Agriculture ===
Hills occupy a large portion of Giridih district. The soil is generally rocky and sandy and that helps jungles and bushes to grow. The forest area, forming a large portion of total area, in the district is evenly distributed all over. Some areas near the rivers have alluvial soil. In Bengabad CD block, the percentage of cultivable area to total area is 24.00%. The percentage of cultivable area to the total area for the district, as a whole, is 27.04%. Irrigation is inadequate. The percentage of irrigated area to cultivable area in Bengabad CD block is 10.85%. May to October is the Kharif season, followed by the Rabi season. Rice, sown in 50% of the gross sown area, is the main crop in the district. Other important crops grown are: maize, wheat, sugar cane, pulses and vegetables.

=== Mica and coal mining ===
Mica and coal are mined in Bengabad CD block.

=== Backward Regions Grant Fund ===
Giridih district is listed as a backward region and receives financial support from the Backward Regions Grant Fund. The fund created by the Government of India is designed to redress regional imbalances in development. As of 2012, 272 districts across the country were listed under this scheme. The list includes 21 districts of Jharkhand.

== Education ==
Bengabad CD block has 55 villages with pre-primary schools, 173 villages with primary schools, 68 villages with middle schools, 7 villages with secondary schools, 1 village with senior secondary school, and 57 villages with no educational facility.
.*Senior secondary schools are also known as Inter colleges in Jharkhand

== Healthcare ==
Bengabad CD block has 1 village with community health centre, 10 villages with primary health subcentres, 1 village with maternity and child welfare centre, 2 villages with allopathic hospitals, 6 villages with dispensaries, 1 village with veterinary hospital, 2 villages with family welfare centres, and 1 village with medicine shop.
.*Private medical practitioners, alternative medicine etc. not included
