= Dumri, Giridih (community development block) =

Dumri Ḍumrī
- Community Development Block
- Location in Giridih District
- Interactive map of Dumri
- Coordinates: 23.9915200°N 86.0043030°E
- Country: India
- State: Jharkhand
- District: Giridih
- Subdivision: Dumri
- Headquarters: Dumri
- Panchayat: 37 (4th)

Government
  - Type: Federal democracy
  - Block Development Officer: Anvesha Ona
  - Circle Officer: Shashi Bhushan Verma

Area
  - Total: 427.34 km^{2} (165.00 sq mi)
  - Rank: 3rd
- Elevation: 332 m (1,089 ft)

Population (2011)
  - Total: 226,006
  - Rank: 4th
  - Density: 528.87/km^{2} (1,369.8/sq mi)
  - Rank: 6th

Languages
  - Official: Hindi, Urdu
- Time zone: UTC+5:30 (IST)
- PIN: 825106 (Dumri); 825167 (Isri Bazar)
- Telephone/STD code: 06558
- Vehicle registration: JH-11
- Lok Sabha constituency: Giridih
- Vidhan Sabha constituency: Dumri
- Literacy: 63.55%
- Sex Ratio: 943
- Website: giridih.nic.in

Dumri (Hindi: ḍūmri, pronounced [ɖuːmri]) is a community development block (CD block) that forms an administrative division in the Dumri sub-division of the Giridih district in the Indian state of Jharkhand.

== Overview ==
Giridih is a plateau region. The western portion of the district is part of a larger central plateau. The rest of the district is a lower plateau, a flat table land with an elevation of about 1,300 feet. At the edges, the ghats drop to about 700 feet. The Pareshnath Hills or Shikharji rises to a height of 4,480 feet in the south-eastern part of the district. The district is thickly forested. Amongst the natural resources, it has coal and mica. Inaugurating the Pradhan Mantri Ujjwala Yojana in 2016, Raghubar Das, Chief Minister of Jharkhand, had indicated that there were 23 lakh BPL families in Jharkhand. There was a plan to bring the BPL proportion in the total population down to 35%.

== Maoist activities ==
Jharkhand is one of the states affected by Maoist activities. As of 2012, Giridih was one of the 14 highly affected districts in the state.As of 2016, Giridih was identified as one of the 13 focus areas by the state police to check Maoist activities. In 2017, the Moists, in Giridih district, have torched more than 50 vehicles engaged in road construction or carrying goods.

== Geography ==
Dumri is located at 23°59′29″N 86°00′15″E.

Dumri CD block is bounded by Sariya, Birni and Giridih CD blocks on the north, Pirtand CD block on the east, Nawadih CD block, in Bokaro district, on the south and Bagodar CD block on the west.

Dumri CD block has an area of 427.33 km^{2}. It has 37 gram panchayats, 181 inhabited villages and 2 census towns. Dumri and Nimiyaghat police stations serve this block. Headquarters of this CD block is at Dumri. 4.48% of the area has forest cover.

The Jamunia River runs near the Grand Trunk Road from around Bagodar to past Dumri and then turns south, forms the border between Dhanbad and Bokaro districts and joins the Damodar.

Gram panchayats in Dumri CD block are: Sasarkho, Nagabad, Khudisar, Jitkundi, Jaridih, Barki Bergi, Behra Suiadih, Parsabeda, Atki, Chhachhando, Chainpur, Kalhawawar, Chengro, Chino, Kulgo (N), Kulgo (S), Dumri, Amra, Bharkhar, Tengra Khurd, Asurbadh, Dumarchutio, Madh Gopali, JamRtara, Isri Bazar (N), Isri Bazar (S), Ranga Matti, Laxmantunda, Kheratunda, Roshnatunda, Balutunda, Lohedih, Nagri, Poraiya, Balthariya, Shankardih and Thakurchak.

== Demographics ==
According to the 2011 Census of India Dumri CD block had a total population of 226,006, of which 210,002 were rural and 16,004 were urban. There were 116,397 (52%) males and 109,609 (48%) females. Population in the age range 0–6 years was 40,281. Scheduled Castes numbered 23,045 (10.20%) and Scheduled Tribes numbered 23,547 (10.42%).

Census towns in Dumri CD block are (2011 census population figure in brackets): Isri (9,749) and Jamtara (6,255).

=== Literacy ===
As of 2011 census the total number of literate persons in Dumri CD block was 118,024 (63.55% of the population over 6 years) out of which males numbered 74,181 (67.68% of the male population over 6 years) and females numbered 43,483 (48.66% of the female population over 6 years). The gender disparity (the difference between female and male literacy rates) was 19.02%.

As of 2011 census, literacy in Giridih district was 63.14% Literacy in Jharkhand was 66.41% in 2011. Literacy in India in 2011 was 74.04%.

See also – List of Jharkhand districts ranked by literacy rate

Literacy in CD Blocks of
Giridih district
Giridih subdivision
Giridih - 63.22%
Gandey - 56.30%
Bengabad - 59.33%
Dumri subdivision
Dumri - 63.55%
Pirtand - 47.22%
Bagodar Saria subdivision
Bagodar - 64.43%
Suriya - 66.25%
Birni - 61.47%
Khori Mahua subdivision
Dhanwar - 65.44%
Jamua - 63.99%
Deori - 62.54%
Tisri - 55.27%
Gawan - 60.94 %
Source: 2011 Census: CD Block Wise
Primary Census Abstract Data

=== Language and religion ===
Religions in Dumri CD block (2011)
Religion	Percent
Hinduism	74.58%
Islam	22.86%
Other*	1.85%
Other or not stated	0.71%
*mainly tribal religions like Sarna

Languages of Dumri block (2011)
1. Khortha (75.8%)
2. Hindi (9.77%)
3. Santali (9.29%)
4. Urdu (4.65%)
5. Others (0.49%)

Khortha is the main spoken language. Hindi is the official language. Urdu and Santali are also spoken.

== Rural poverty ==
40-50% of the population of Giridih district were in the BPL category in 2004–2005, being in the same category as Godda, Koderma and Hazaribagh districts. Rural poverty in Jharkhand declined from 66% in 1993–94 to 46% in 2004–05. In 2011, it has come down to 39.1%.

== Economy ==
=== Livelihood ===
Livelihood
in Dumri CD block
1. Cultivators (24.5%)
2. Agricultural labourers (47.7%)
3. Household industries (2.29%)
4. Other Workers (25.6%)

In Dumri CD block in 2011, amongst the class of total workers, cultivators numbered 23,113 and formed 24.43%, agricultural labourers numbered 45,113 and formed 47.69%, household industry workers numbered 2,164 and formed 2.29% and other workers numbered 24,203 and formed 25.59%. Total workers numbered 94,593 and formed 41.85% of the total population, and non-workers numbered 131,493 and formed 58.15% of the population.

Note: In the census records a person is considered a cultivator, if the person is engaged in cultivation/ supervision of land owned. When a person who works on another person's land for wages in cash or kind or share, is regarded as an agricultural labourer. Household industry is defined as an industry conducted by one or more members of the family within the household or village, and one that does not qualify for registration as a factory under the Factories Act. Other workers are persons engaged in some economic activity other than cultivators, agricultural labourers and household workers. It includes factory, mining, plantation, transport and office workers, those engaged in business and commerce, teachers, entertainment artistes and so on.

=== Infrastructure ===
There are 181 inhabited villages in Dumri CD block. In 2011, 117 villages had power supply. 4 villages had tap water (treated/ untreated), 176 villages had well water (covered/ uncovered), 163 villages had hand pumps, and all villages had drinking water facility. 23 villages had post offices, 13 villages had a sub post office, 12 villages had telephones (land lines) and 98 villages had mobile phone coverage. 178 villages had pucca (paved) village roads, 30 villages had bus service (public/ private), 30 villages had autos/ modified autos, and 46 villages had tractors. 20 villages had bank branches, 6 villages had agricultural credit societies, 1 village had cinema/ video hall, 3 villages had public library and public reading room. 68 villages had public distribution system, 20 villages had weekly haat (market) and 98 villages had assembly polling stations.

=== Agriculture ===
Hills occupy a large portion of Giridih district. The soil is generally rocky and sandy and that helps jungles and bushes to grow. The forest area, forming a large portion of total area, in the district is evenly distributed all over. Some areas near the rivers have alluvial soil. In Dumri CD block, the percentage of cultivable area to total area is 22.87%. The percentage of cultivable area to the total area for the district, as a whole, is 27.04%. Irrigation is inadequate. The percentage of irrigated area to cultivable area in Dumri CD block is 8.98%. May to October is the Kharif season, followed by the Rabi season. Rice, sown in 50% of the gross sown area, is the main crop in the district. Other important crops grown are: maize, wheat, sugar cane, pulses and vegetables.

=== Coal mining ===
Coal is mined in Dumri CD block.

=== Backward Regions Grant Fund ===
Giridih district is listed as a backward region and receives financial support from the Backward Regions Grant Fund. The fund created by the Government of India is designed to redress regional imbalances in development. As of 2012, 272 districts across the country were listed under this scheme. The list includes 21 districts of Jharkhand.

== Transport ==
The Asansol-Gaya section, a part of the Grand Chord, Howrah-Gaya-Delhi line and Howrah-Allahabad-Mumbai line, passes through this block. Parasnath railway station and Nimiaghat railway station are on this line.

NH 19 (old numbering NH 2)/ Grand Trunk Road passes through this CD block.

== Education ==
Dumri CD block had 30 villages with pre-primary schools, 165 villages with primary schools, 91 villages with middle schools, 12 villages with secondary schools, 5 villages with senior secondary schools, 1 general degree college, 15 villages with no educational facility.
.*Senior secondary schools are also known as Inter colleges in Jharkhand

- Parashnath Mahavidyalaya was established at Isri Bazar in 1985. Affiliated with Vinoba Bhave University it offers bachelor's courses in arts, science and commerce.
- Jharkhand College was established at Dumri in 1985. It is affiliated with Vinoba Bhave University. It offers courses in arts, science and commerce.

== Healthcare ==
Dumri CD block had 1 village with community health centre, 1 village with primary health centre, 12 villages with primary health subcentres, 4 villages with maternity and child welfare centres, 5 villages with allopathic hospitals, 6 villages with dispensaries, 4 villages with family welfare centres, 26 villages with medicine shops.
.*Private medical practitioners, alternative medicine etc. not included
