= Dumri, Giridih =

Dumri
- Village
- Location in Jharkhand, India Dumri (India)
- Coordinates: 24.00452°N 86.000103°E
- Country: India
- State: Jharkhand
- District: Giridih
- Elevation: 332 m (1,089 ft)

Population (2011)
  - Total: 5,639

Languages (*For language details see Dumri, Giridih (community development block)#Language and religion)
  - Official: Hindi, Urdu
- Time zone: UTC+5:30 (IST)
- PIN: 825106 (Dumri)
- Telephone/ STD code: 06558
- Lok Sabha constituency: Giridih
- Vidhan Sabha constituency: Dumri
- Website: giridih.nic.in

Dumri is a village in the Dumri CD block in the Dumri subdivision of the Giridih district in the Indian state of Jharkhand.

== Civic administration ==
=== Police station ===
Dumri police station has jurisdiction over a part of the Dumri CD block. According to old British records, Dumri PS was there after the Giridh subdivision was formed in 1870.

=== CD block HQ ===
The headquarters of the Dumri CD block are located at Dumri village.

== Demographics ==
According to the 2011 Census of India, Dumri had a total population of 5,639, of which 2,935 (52%) were males and 2,704 (48%) were females. Population in the age range 0-6 years was 896. The total number of literate persons in Dumri was 3,305 (69.68% of the population over 6 years).

== Geography ==
Cities, towns and locations in the Giridih district in North Chotanagpur Division
M: municipality, CT: census town, R: rural/ urban centre, H: historical/ religious/ tourist centre
Owing to space constraints in the small map, the actual locations in a larger map may vary slightly

=== Location ===
Dumri is located at 24.00452°N 86.000103°E.

=== Area overview ===
Giridih district is a part of the Chota Nagpur Plateau, with rocky soil and extensive forests. Most of the rivers in the district flow from the west to east, except in the northern portion where the rivers flow north and north west. The Pareshnath Hill rises to a height of 4,479 feet (1,365 m). The district has coal and mica mines. It is an overwhelmingly rural district with small pockets of urbanisation.

Note: The map alongside presents some of the notable locations in the district. All places marked in the map are linked in the larger full screen map.

== Education ==
Jharkhand College, Dumri was established in 1985. It is affiliated with Vinoba Bhave University. It offers courses in arts, science and commerce.

== Transport ==
NH 19 (old numbering NH 2)/ Grand Trunk Road passes through Dumri.
