= Jamua (community development block) =

Jamua Jamuā
- Community Development Block
- Location in Giridih District
- Interactive map of Jamua
- Coordinates: 24°22′13″N 86°8′51″E
- Country: India
- State: Jharkhand
- District: Giridih
- Subdivision: Khori Mahuwa
- Headquarters: Jamua
- Panchayat: 42 (1st)

Government
  - Type: Federal democracy
  - Block Development Officer: Amal G
  - Circle Officer: Sanjay Pandey

Area
  - Total: 478.50 km^{2} (184.75 sq mi)
  - Rank: 1st
- Elevation: 298 m (978 ft)

Population (2011)
  - Total: 273,563
  - Rank: 2nd
  - Density: 571.71/km^{2} (1,480.7/sq mi)
  - Rank: 4th

Languages
  - Official: Hindi, Urdu
- Time zone: UTC+5:30 (IST)
- PIN: 815312 (Jamua)
- Telephone/STD code: 06554
- Vehicle registration: JH-11
- Lok Sabha constituency: Kodarma
- Vidhan Sabha constituency: Jamua
- Literacy: 64.02%
- Sex Ratio: 941
- Website: giridih.nic.in

Jamua is a community development block (CD block) that forms an administrative division in the Khori Mahuwa subdivision of the Giridih district in the Indian state of Jharkhand.

== Overview ==
Giridih is a plateau region. The western portion of the district is part of a larger central plateau. The rest of the district is a lower plateau, a flat table land with an elevation of about 1,300 feet. At the edges, the ghats drop to about 700 feet. The Pareshnath Hills or Shikharji rises to a height of 4,480 feet in the south-eastern part of the district. The district is thickly forested. Amongst the natural resources, it has coal and mica. Inaugurating the Pradhan Mantri Ujjwala Yojana in 2016, Raghubar Das, Chief Minister of Jharkhand, had indicated that there were 23 lakh BPL families in Jharkhand. There was a plan to bring the BPL proportion in the total population down to 35%.

== Maoist activities ==
Jharkhand is one of the states affected by Maoist activities. As of 2012, Giridih was one of the 14 highly affected districts in the state.As of 2016, Giridih was identified as one of the 13 focus areas by the state police to check Maoist activities. In 2017, the Moists, in Giridih district, have torched more than 50 vehicles engaged in road construction or carrying goods.

== Geography ==
Jamua is located at 24°22′13″N 86°8′51″E.

Jamua CD block is bounded by Deori CD block on the north, Bengabad CD block on the east, Giridih and Birni CD blocks on the south and Domchanch, in Koderma district, and Dhanwar CD block on the west.

Jamua CD block has an area of 478.47 km^{2}. It has 42 gram panchayats, 305 inhabited villages. Jamua and Hirodih police stations serve this block. Headquarters of this CD block is at Jamua. 14.37% of the area has forest cover.

Rivers in Jamua CD block are Mango, Orari and Bara.

Gram panchayats in Jamua CD block are: Karihari, Chungalkhar, Pandedih, Palmo, Fataha, Dhuraita, Remba, Dhotho, Shali, Pindarsot, Baddiha, Dhurgadgi, Tara, Chunglo, Kendua, Chachghara, Charghara, Jaridih, Nawadih, Harladih, Pobi, Chakmanjo, Kharagdiha, Jagranathdih, Tikamagha, Magha Kala, Pratappur, Balgo, Dharmpur, Medho Chaparkho, Lataki, Chorgata, Goro, Siyatand, Chilga, Nawdiha, Kurhobindo, Malutand, Chitardih, Karodih and Behrabad.

== Demographics ==
=== Population ===
According to the 2011 Census of India, Jamua CD block had a total population of 271,563, all of which were rural. There were 139,892 (52%) males and 131,671 (48%) females. Population in the age range 0–6 years was 51,706. Scheduled Castes numbered 41,800 (15.39%) and Scheduled Tribes numbered 2,689 (0.99%).

=== Literacy ===
As of 2011 census the total number of literate persons in Jamua CD block was 140,748 (63.99% of the population over 6 years) out of which males numbered 89,067 (78.65% of the male population over 6 years) and females numbered 51,681 (48.47% of the female population over 6 years). The gender disparity (the difference between female and male literacy rates) was 30.18%.

As of 2011 census, literacy in Giridih district was 63.14% Literacy in Jharkhand was 66.41% in 2011. Literacy in India in 2011 was 74.04%.

See also – List of Jharkhand districts ranked by literacy rate

Literacy in CD Blocks of
Giridih district
Giridih subdivision
Giridih - 63.22%
Gandey - 56.30%
Bengabad - 59.33%
Dumri subdivision
Dumri - 63.55%
Pirtand - 47.22%
Bagodar Saria subdivision
Bagodar - 64.43%
Suriya - 66.25%
Birni - 61.47%
Khori Mahua subdivision
Dhanwar - 65.44%
Jamua - 63.99%
Deori - 62.54%
Tisri - 55.27%
Gawan - 60.94 %
Source: 2011 Census: CD Block Wise
Primary Census Abstract Data

=== Language and religion ===
Religions in Jamua CD block (2011)
Religion	Percent
Hinduism	78.90%
Islam	20.78%
Other or not stated	0.32%

Languages of Jamua block (2011)
1. Khortha (75.8%)
2. Hindi (18.3%)
3. Urdu (5.37%)
4. Others (0.54%)

Khortha is the main spoken language. Hindi is the official language. Urdu is also spoken.

== Rural poverty ==
40-50% of the population of Giridih district were in the BPL category in 2004–2005, being in the same category as Godda, Koderma and Hazaribagh districts. Rural poverty in Jharkhand declined from 66% in 1993–94 to 46% in 2004–05. In 2011, it has come down to 39.1%.

== Economy ==
=== Livelihood ===
Livelihood
in Jamua CD block
1. Cultivators (42.5%)
2. Agricultural labourers (35.6%)
3. Household industries (1.97%)
4. Other Workers (20.0%)

In Jamua CD block in 2011, amongst the class of total workers, cultivators numbered 48,688 and formed 42.46%, agricultural labourers numbered 40,780 and formed 35.57%, household industry workers numbered 2,256 and formed 1.97% and other workers numbered 22,938 and formed 20.00%. Total workers numbered 114,662 and formed 42.22% of the total population, and non-workers numbered 156,901 and formed 57.78% of the population.

Note: In the census records a person is considered a cultivator, if the person is engaged in cultivation/ supervision of land owned. When a person who works on another person's land for wages in cash or kind or share, is regarded as an agricultural labourer. Household industry is defined as an industry conducted by one or more members of the family within the household or village, and one that does not qualify for registration as a factory under the Factories Act. Other workers are persons engaged in some economic activity other than cultivators, agricultural labourers and household workers. It includes factory, mining, plantation, transport and office workers, those engaged in business and commerce, teachers, entertainment artistes and so on.

=== Infrastructure ===
There are 305 inhabited villages in Jamua CD block. In 2011, 83 villages had power supply. 1 village had tap water (treated/ untreated), 301 villages had well water (covered/ uncovered), 301 villages had hand pumps, and all villages had drinking water facility. 67 villages had post offices, 29 villages had a sub post office, 8 villages had telephones (land lines) and 23 villages had mobile phone coverage. 302 villages had pucca (paved) village roads, 70 villages had bus service (public/ private), 45 villages had autos/ modified autos, and 190 villages had tractors. 39 villages had bank branches, 7 villages had agricultural credit societies, 3 villages had cinema/ video hall, 1 village had public library and public reading room. 31 villages had public distribution system, 9 villages had weekly haat (market) and 81 villages had assembly polling stations.

=== Agriculture ===
Jamua CD block predominantly depends on agriculture. However, brick kilns, stone crushing plants etc. are major establishments in the block .

Hills occupy a large portion of Giridih district. The soil is generally rocky and sandy and that helps jungles and bushes to grow. The forest area, forming a large portion of total area, in the district is evenly distributed all over. Some areas near the rivers have alluvial soil. In Jamua CD block, the percentage of cultivable area to total area is 25.57%. The percentage of cultivable area to the total area for the district, as a whole, is 27.04%. Irrigation is inadequate. The percentage of irrigated area to cultivable area in Jamua CD block is 14.95%. May to October is the Kharif season, followed by the Rabi season. Rice, sown in 50% of the gross sown area, is the main crop in the district. Other important crops grown are: maize, wheat, sugar cane, pulses and vegetables.

=== Backward Regions Grant Fund ===
Giridih district is listed as a backward region and receives financial support from the Backward Regions Grant Fund. The fund created by the Government of India is designed to redress regional imbalances in development. As of 2012, 272 districts across the country were listed under this scheme. The list includes 21 districts of Jharkhand.

== Transport ==
State Highway 13 (Jharkhand), running from Koderma to Gobindpur on NH 19 (old NH 2)/ Grand Trunk Road, passes through this block.

Madhupur-Giridih-Koderma line passes through this block and there is a station at Jamua.

== Education ==
Jamua CD block had 82 villages with pre-primary schools, 262 villages with primary schools, 139 villages with middle schools, 26 villages with secondary schools, 8 villages with senior secondary schools, 2 villages with general degree colleges, 42 villages with no educational facility.
.*Senior secondary schools are also known as Inter colleges in Jharkhand

- Langtababa Mahavidyalaya was established at Mirzaganj, Giridih, in 1983. It is affiliated with Vinoba Bhave University. (It is not clear what courses it offers).

== Healthcare ==
Jamua CD block had 1 village with community health centre, 2 villages with primary health centres, 19 villages with primary health subcentres, 1 village with maternity and child welfare centre, 6 villages with dispensaries, 4 villages with family welfare centres, 19 villages with medicine shops.
.*Private medical practitioners, alternative medicine etc. not included
