= Pirtand block =

Pirtand Pīrṭaṇṛ
- Community Development Block
- Location in Giridih District
- Interactive map of Pirtand
- Coordinates: 24°2′36″N 86°9′37″E
- Country: India
- State: Jharkhand
- District: Giridih
- Subdivision: Dumri
- Headquarters: Pirtand
- Panchayat: 17 (12th)

Government
  - Type: Federal democracy
  - Block Development Officer: Manoj Marandi
  - Circle Officer: Rishikesh Marandi

Area
  - Total: 392.82 km^{2} (151.67 sq mi)
  - Rank: 6th
- Elevation: 332 m (1,089 ft)

Population (2011)
  - Total: 109,515
  - Rank: 12th
  - Density: 278.79/km^{2} (722.07/sq mi)
  - Rank: 12th

Languages
  - Official: Hindi, Urdu
- Time zone: UTC+5:30 (IST)
- PIN: 825108 (Pirtand)
- Telephone/STD code: 06532
- Vehicle registration: JH-11
- Lok Sabha constituency: Giridih
- Vidhan Sabha constituency: Giridih
- Literacy: 52.60%
- Sex Ratio: 959
- Website: giridih.nic.in

Pirtand is a community development block (CD block) that forms an administrative division in the Dumri sub-division of the Giridih district in the Indian state of Jharkhand.

== Overview ==
Giridih is a plateau region. The western portion of the district is part of a larger central plateau. The rest of the district is a lower plateau, a flat table land with an elevation of about 1,300 feet. At the edges, the ghats drop to about 700 feet. The Pareshnath Hills or Shikharji rises to a height of 4,480 feet in the south-eastern part of the district. The district is thickly forested. Amongst the natural resources, it has coal and mica. Inaugurating the Pradhan Mantri Ujjwala Yojana in 2016, Raghubar Das, Chief Minister of Jharkhand, had indicated that there were 23 lakh BPL families in Jharkhand. There was a plan to bring the BPL proportion in the total population down to 35%.

== Maoist activities ==
Jharkhand is one of the states affected by Maoist activities. As of 2012, Giridih was one of the 14 highly affected districts in the state.As of 2016, Giridih was identified as one of the 13 focus areas by the state police to check Maoist activities. In 2017, the Moists, in Giridih district, have torched more than 50 vehicles engaged in road construction or carrying goods.

== Geography ==
Chirki, a constituent panchayat village of Pirtand CD block, is located at 24°2′36″N 86°9′37″E. Pirtand police station is located at Chirki.

Pirtand CD block is bounded by Giridih CD block on the north, Tundi CD block, in Dhanbad district, on the east, Topchanchi CD block, in Dhanbad district, on the south and Dumri CD block, on the west.

Pirtand CD block has an area of 392.86 km^{2}. It has 17 gram panchayats. Pirtand and Khukhra police stations serve this block. Headquarters of this CD block is at Pirtand. 49.23% of the area has forest cover.

Rivers in Pirtand CD block are Kurko, Chikri and Sita.

Gram panchayats in Pirtand CD block are: Kumharlalo, Bharati Chalkari, Chirki, Madhuban, Bandh, Chilga, Palganj, Nawadih, Bishnupur, Kharpoka, Simarkothi, Harladih, Mandro, Khukhara, Tuio, Badgawan and Kudko.

== Demographics ==
=== Population ===
According to the 2011 Census of India, Pirtanr CD block had a total population of 109,515, all of which were rural. There were 55,917 (51%) males and 53,598 (49%) females. Population in the age range 0–6 years was 21,668. Scheduled Castes numbered 10,181 (9.30%) and Scheduled Tribes numbered 49,145 (44.88%).

=== Literacy ===
As of 2011 census the total number of literate persons in Pirtanr CD block was 46,205 (47.22% of the population over 6 years) out of which males numbered 29,565 (55.16% of the male population over 6 years) and females numbered 16,640 (38.75% of the female population over 6 years). The gender disparity (the difference between female and male literacy rates) was 16.42%.

As of 2011 census, literacy in Giridih district was 63.14% Literacy in Jharkhand was 66.41% in 2011. Literacy in India in 2011 was 74.04%.

See also – List of Jharkhand districts ranked by literacy rate

Literacy in CD Blocks of
Giridih district
Giridih subdivision
Giridih - 63.22%
Gandey - 56.30%
Bengabad - 59.33%
Dumri subdivision
Dumri - 63.55%
Pirtand - 47.22%
Bagodar Saria subdivision
Bagodar - 64.43%
Suriya - 66.25%
Birni - 61.47%
Khori Mahua subdivision
Dhanwar - 65.44%
Jamua - 63.99%
Deori - 62.54%
Tisri - 55.27%
Gawan - 60.94 %
Source: 2011 Census: CD Block Wise
Primary Census Abstract Data

=== Language and religion ===
Religions in Pirtand CD block (2011)
Religion	Percent
Hinduism	80.05%
Other*	9.43%
Islam	8.33%
Christianity	1.41%
Jainism	0.50%
Other or not stated	0.28%
*mainly tribal religions like Sarna

Languages of Pirtand CD block (2011)
1. Khortha (45.6%)
2. Santali (42.5%)
3. Hindi (6.97%)
4. Urdu (3.45%)
5. Others (1.55%)

Khortha is the main spoken language. Hindi is the official language. Urdu and Santali are also spoken.

== Rural poverty ==
40-50% of the population of Giridih district were in the BPL category in 2004–2005, being in the same category as Godda, Koderma and Hazaribagh districts. Rural poverty in Jharkhand declined from 66% in 1993–94 to 46% in 2004–05. In 2011, it has come down to 39.1%.

== Economy ==
=== Livelihood ===
Livelihood
in Pirtanr CD block
1. Cultivators (26.1%)
2. Agricultural labourers (53.5%)
3. Household industries (4.28%)
4. Other Workers (16.1%)

In Pirtanr CD block in 2011, amongst the class of total workers, cultivators numbered 13,744 and formed 26.07%, agricultural labourers numbered 28,207 and formed 53.50%, household industry workers numbered 2,255 and formed 4.28% and other workers numbered 8,514 and formed 16.15%. Total workers numbered 52,720 and formed 48.14% of the total population, and non-workers numbered 56,795 and formed 51.86% of the population.

Note: In the census records a person is considered a cultivator, if the person is engaged in cultivation/ supervision of land owned. When a person who works on another person's land for wages in cash or kind or share, is regarded as an agricultural labourer. Household industry is defined as an industry conducted by one or more members of the family within the household or village, and one that does not qualify for registration as a factory under the Factories Act. Other workers are persons engaged in some economic activity other than cultivators, agricultural labourers and household workers. It includes factory, mining, plantation, transport and office workers, those engaged in business and commerce, teachers, entertainment artistes and so on.

=== Infrastructure ===
There are 194 inhabited villages in Pirtanr CD block. In 2011, 25 villages had power supply. 1 village had tap water (treated/ untreated), 186 villages had well water (covered/ uncovered), 184 villages had hand pumps, and all villages had drinking water facility. 23 villages had post offices, 13 villages had a sub post office, 4 villages had telephones (land lines) and 88 villages had mobile phone coverage. 188 villages had pucca (paved) village roads, 21 villages had bus service (public/ private), 7 villages had autos/ modified autos, and 63 villages had tractors. 16 villages had bank branches, 12 villages had agricultural credit societies, no village had cinema/ video hall, 1 village had public library and public reading room. 45 villages had public distribution system, 19 villages had weekly haat (market) and 77 villages had assembly polling stations.

=== Agriculture ===
Hills occupy a large portion of Giridih district. The soil is generally rocky and sandy and that helps jungles and bushes to grow. The forest area, forming a large portion of total area, in the district is evenly distributed all over. Some areas near the rivers have alluvial soil. In Pirtanr CD block, the percentage of cultivable area to total area is 31.01%. The percentage of cultivable area to the total area for the district, as a whole, is 27.04%. Irrigation is inadequate. The percentage of irrigated area to cultivable area in Pirtanr CD block is 6.79%. May to October is the Kharif season, followed by the Rabi season. Rice, sown in 50% of the gross sown area, is the main crop in the district. Other important crops grown are: maize, wheat, sugar cane, pulses and vegetables.

=== Coal mining ===
Coal is mined in Pirtand CD block.

=== Backward Regions Grant Fund ===
Giridih district is listed as a backward region and receives financial support from the Backward Regions Grant Fund. The fund created by the Government of India is designed to redress regional imbalances in development. As of 2012, 272 districts across the country were listed under this scheme. The list includes 21 districts of Jharkhand.

== Education ==
Pirtand CD block had 27 villages with pre-primary schools, 164 villages with primary schools, 71 villages with middle schools, 11 villages with secondary schools, 6 villages with senior secondary schools, 28 villages with no educational facility.
.*Senior secondary schools are also known as Inter colleges in Jharkhand

== Healthcare ==
Pirtand CD block had 1 village with community health centre, 20 villages with primary health subcentres, 1 village with maternity and child welfare centre, 1 village with allopathic hospital, 5 villages with dispensaries, 9 villages with medicine shops.
.*Private medical practitioners, alternative medicine etc. not included
