= Jharkhand Dham =

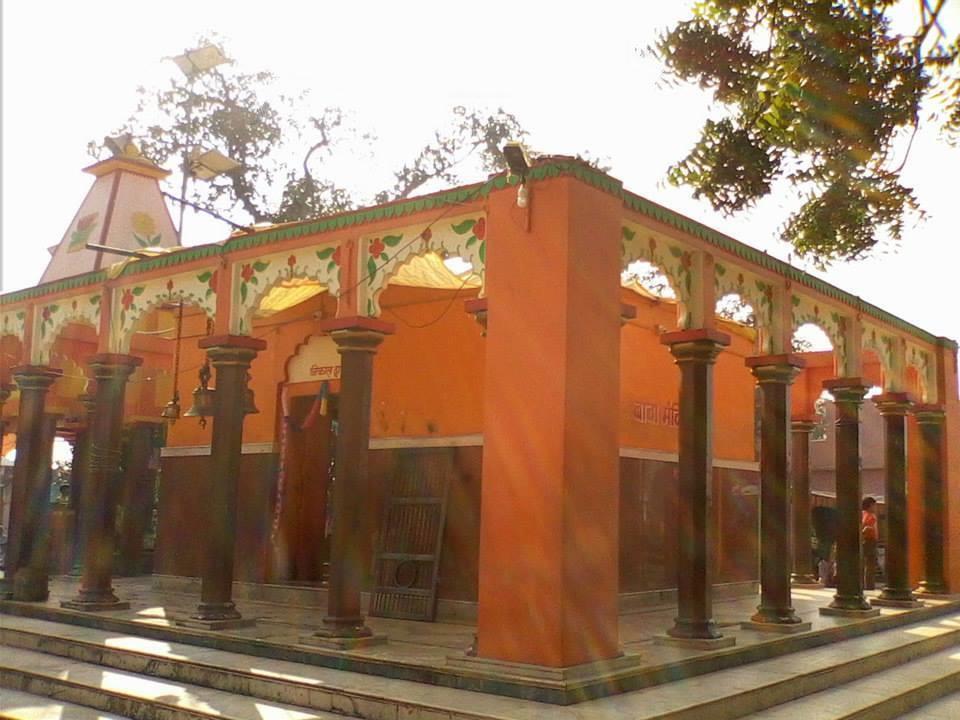
- Jharkhand Dham Shiva Temple

- Location in Jharkhand

Religion
- Affiliation: Hinduism
- District: Giridih
- Deity: Shiva
- Festival: Maha Shivaratri

Location
- Location: Dhanwar
- State: Jharkhand
- Country: India
- Interactive map of Jharkhand Dham
- Coordinates: 24°20′02″N 86°01′4″E

Architecture
- Type: Hindu temple architecture
- Temple: 10

Jharkhand Dham (also known as Jharkhandi) is a temple of the Hindu god Shiva and pilgrimage center near Dhanwar in Giridih District, Jharkhand, India.

== Geography ==
Cities, towns and locations in the Giridih district in North Chotanagpur Division
M: municipality, CT: census town, R: rural/ urban centre, H: historical/ religious/ tourist centre
Owing to space constraints in the small map, the actual locations in a larger map may vary slightly

=== Location ===
Jharkhand Dham is located at 24°20′02″N 86°01′4″E.

It is approximately 55 km from Giridih and 10 km from Rajdhanwar. Note: The map alongside presents some of the notable locations in the district. All places marked in the map are linked in the larger full screen map.

There is a temple to Shiva, where an annual fair takes place.

On the southwest side of temple is the Irga river.

== Education ==
Sanskrit Hindi Vidyapith was established at Jharkhanddham, Giridih, in 1967. It is an institute specializing in Sanskrit, but also offers other courses. It is affiliated to Vinoba Bhave University. It has hostel facilities.
