= Dumri subdivision =

Dumri subdivision Dumari subdivision
- Subdivision
- Location in West Bengal, India Dumri subdivision (India)
- Coordinates: 23.991528°N 86.004306°E
- Country: India
- State: Jharkhand
- District: Giridih
- Headquarters: Dumri

Government
  - Type: Representative democracy

Area
  - Total: 820.15 km^{2} (316.66 sq mi)

Population (2011)
  - Total: 335,521
  - Density: 409.10/km^{2} (1,059.6/sq mi)

Languages
  - Official: Hindi, Urdu
- Time zone: UTC+5:30 (IST)
- Website: giridih.nic.in

Dumri subdivision is an administrative subdivision of the Giridih district in the state of Jharkhand, India. Dumri subdivision's population is between 4.5 to 5.5 lakh by 2026.

== History ==
Dumri subdivision was created in March 2014.

Cities, towns and locations in the Giridih district in North Chotanagpur Division
M: municipality, CT: census town, R: rural/ urban centre, H: historical/ religious/ tourist centre
Owing to space constraints in the small map, the actual locations in a larger map may vary slightly

== Subdivisions ==
Giridih district is divided into the following administrative subdivisions:

Subdivision	Headquarters	Area km^{2} (2001)	Population (2011)	Rural population % (2011)	Urban population % (2011)
Dumri	Dumri	820.15	335,521	95.23	4.77
Giridih Sadar	Giridih	1148.64	700,855	93.17	6.83
Bagodar-Saria	Suriya	864.04	476,613	96.02	3.98
Khori Mahuwa	Khori Mahua	2020.73	932,485	98.95	1.05

== Police stations ==
Police stations in Dumri subdivision have the following features and jurisdiction:

Police station	Area covered km^{2}	Municipal town	CD Block
Dumri	n/a	-	Dumri -
Nimiyaghat	n/a	-	Dumri
Pirtand	n/a	-	Pirtand
Khukhra	n/a	-	Pirtand

== Blocks ==
Community development blocks in Dumri subdivision are:

CD Block	Headquarters	Area km^{2}	Population (2011)	SC %	ST %	Hindus %	Muslims %	Literacy rate %	Census Towns
Dumri	Dumri	427.33	179,114	10.42	10.20	74.58	22.86	63.55	Isri and Jamtara
Pirtand	Pirtand	392.82	87,204	9.30	44.88	80.05	8.33	47.22	-

== Education ==
Given in the table below is a comprehensive picture of the education scenario in Giridih district.:

Subdivision	Primary School		Middle School		High School		Higher Secondary School		General College, Univ		Technical / Professional Instt		Non-formal Education	
Subdivision	Institution	Student	Institution	Student	Institution	Student	Institution	Student	Institution	Student	Institution	Student	Institution	Student
Dumri	342	43,033	209	18,561	27	8,901	4	6,673	-	-	-	-	-	-
Khori Mahuwa	905	133,026	508	49,979	73	24,318	8	13,067	1	1,568	-	-	-	-
Bagodar Saria	333	54,217	225	23,670	53	11,943	3	2,817	-	-	-	-	-	-
Giridih Sadar	590	80,952	314	33,912	50	19,187	6	11,701	2	7098	5	447	-	-
Giridih district	2,170	311,228	1,256	126,122	203	64,349	21	34,258	3	8,676	5	447	-	-

=== Educational institutions ===
The following institutions are located in Dumri subdivision:

- Parashnath Mahavidyalaya was established at Isri Bazar in 1985. Affiliated to Vinoba Bhave University it offers bachelor’s courses in arts, science and commerce.
- Jharkhand College was established at Dumri in 1985. It is affiliated with Vinoba Bhave University. It offers courses in arts, science and commerce.
