= Giridih district =

Coordinates: 24°10′48″N 86°19′12″E

Giridih district Giriḍīh Zilā
- District of Jharkhand
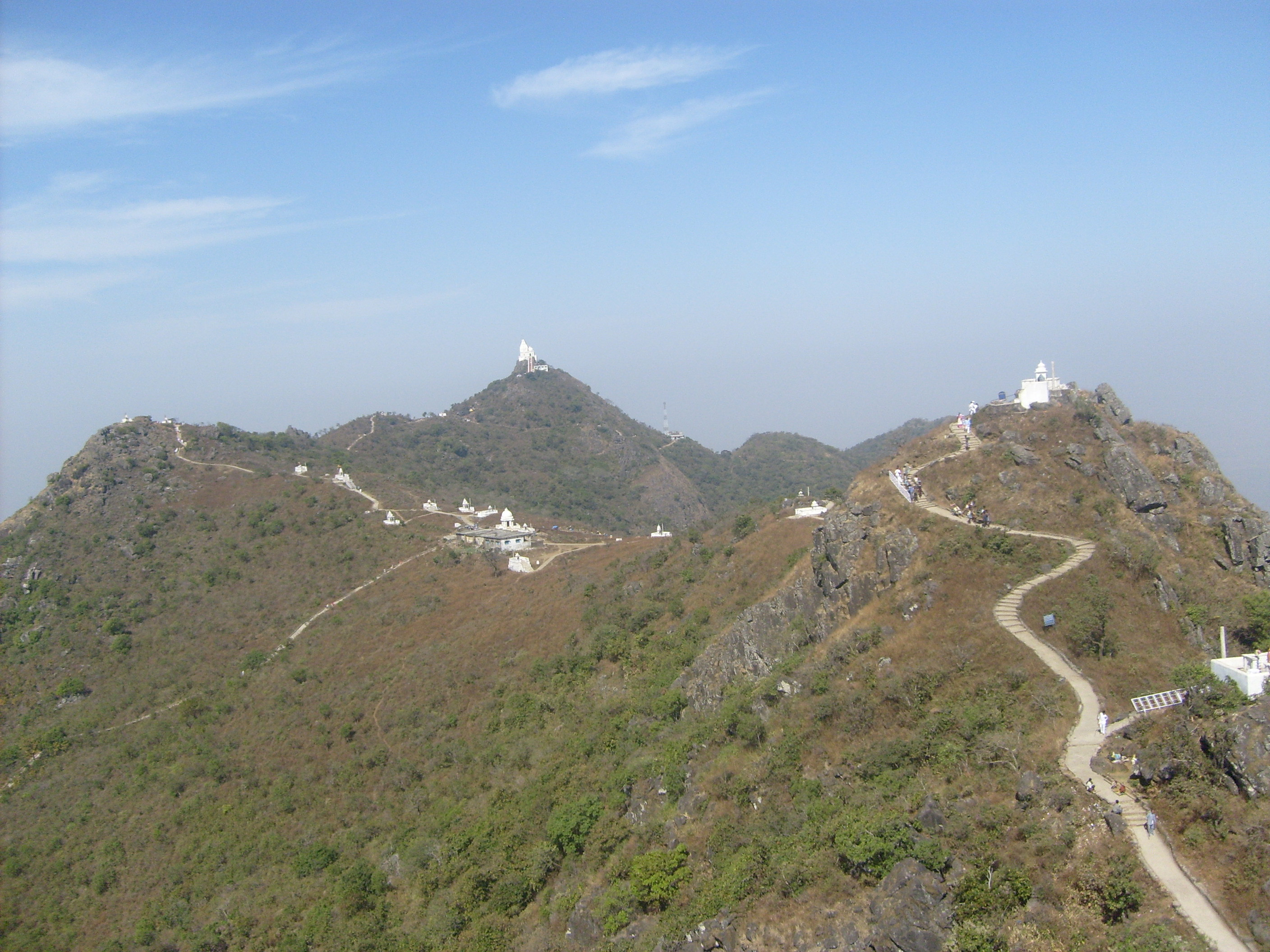
- Shikharji on Parasnath Hills
- Interactive map of Giridih district
- Country: India
- State: Jharkhand
- Division: North Chotanagpur
- Carved out from Hazaribagh district: 4th December 1972
- Founder: Kedar Pandey
- Named for: Giri (Hill)
- Headquarters: Giridih
- Sub Divisions: List: Giridih; Khori Mahua; Bagodar-Saria; Dumri

Government
  - DC: Mr. Ramniwas Yadav (IAS)
  - SP: Dr. Bimal Kumar (IPS)
  - MPs: Chandra Prakash Choudhary (Giridih); Annapurna Devi (Kodarma)
  - MLAs: Babulal Marandi (Dhanwar); Nagendra Mahto (Bagodar); Manju Kumari (Jamua); Kalpana Soren (Gandey); Vacant (Giridih); Jairam Kumar Mahato (Dumri)

Area
  - Total: 4,853.56 km^{2} (1,873.97 sq mi)
  - Rank: 4th
- Highest elevation: 1,365 m (4,478 ft)

Population (2011)
  - Total: 2,445,474
  - Rank: 3rd
  - Density: 503.852/km^{2} (1,304.97/sq mi)
  - Rank: 10th
  - Urban: 6.41%

Demographics
  - Literacy: 63.14%
  - Sex ratio: 940♀/1000♂
- Time zone: UTC+05:30 (IST)
- Website: giridih.nic.in

Giridih district (Note: Hindi: Girīḍīh Zilā, pronounced [ɡɪ.rɪˈɖiːɦ ˈzɪ.laː]) is one of the twenty-four districts of Jharkhand state, India, and Giridih is the administrative headquarters of this district. As of 2011 it is the third most populous district of Jharkhand (out of 24), after Ranchi and Dhanbad.

== History ==
Giridih district was a part of Kharagdiha till late 18th century. Kharagdiha was founded in 15th century when the then Maharaja was able to influence and impress the Ghatwals of Kharagdiha Gadis. The Hazaribagh Gazetteer describes this kingdom 600 miles long which spread from Hazaribagh to Gaya. The Kharagdiha gadis were semi-independent chiefdoms. All that the ruler of the Gadi had to do on succession was to acknowledge the supremacy of the Kharagdiha Maharaja. Koderma, Palganj, Ledo, Ghoranji, Srerampur, and Sirsia were notable gadis.

During the British Raj, Kharagdiha became a part of Jungle Terry. The Gadis of Kharagdiha were permanently settled and they became Zamindari estates. The rulers of Kharagdiha were separately settled the zamindari estate of Raj Dhanwar in 1809. There was a total of 84 divisions of Kharagdiha called gadis, but 33 of these were transferred to other perganas, there were only 51 of these left who paid their rent through 36 toujis, and all of the gadidars/ ghatwals received mokarari Pattas from the Collector at different times. And in 1809, the remainder of Kharagdiha Perganan consisting of 54 villages was settled permanently with Girwar Narayan Deo on a revenue of Rs 5,226-12-10. This completed the settlement of Kharagdiha by creating 50 mukarrari gadis/ mahals and one permanently settled estate. Subsequently, the pargana contained, among its various classes of landholding, 20 Shamilat Taluks and 58 further Mukarrari Taluks created under later written engagements.

Subsequent to the Kol uprising in 1831 that, did not seriously affect Hazaribag, however, the administrative structure of the territory was changed. The parganas of Ramgarh, Kharagdiha, Kendi and Kunda became parts of the South-West Frontier Agency and were formed into a division named Hazaribag as the administrative headquarters.

In 1854, the designation of South-West Frontier Agency was changed to Chota Nagpur Division and it began to be administered as a Non-regulation province under the Lieutenant Governor of the then Bihar. In 1855-56 there was the great uprising of the Santhals against the British but was brutally suppressed.

Giridih district was created on December 4, 1972 by carving some parts of Hazaribagh district. In 1999 part of it became Bokaro district.

It is currently a part of the Red Corridor.

== Geography ==
The district, covering an area of around 4854 km^{2}, is bounded on the north by Jamui district and Nawada district of Bihar state, on the east by the districts of Deoghar and Jamtara, on the south by Dhanbad and Bokaro, and on the west by Hazaribagh and Koderma districts.

Giridih has an average elevation of 289 metres (948 feet). Śrī Sammeta Shikharji also known as the Parasnath Hills, it is one of the holiest place of Jainism, located in Giridih is the highest mountain peak in Jharkhand. It is a conical granite peak located 4,477 feet (1,382 metres) above the sea level.

Gawan and Tisari blocks of the district have several mica mines, and coal is found abundantly at several places throughout the district.

Parasnath Hills are located in the district. There are two major rivers, namely, the Barakar River and the Sakri River. Barakar River passes through Birni and Pirtand blocks. Sakari river drains the areas of Deori and Gawan blocks. There are several smaller rivers, including Usri, with a major tourist attraction - Usri Falls.

== Administration ==
=== Subdivisions ===
Following are the four subdivision of the district:

1. Giridih subdivision
2. Bagodar-Sariya subdivision
3. Khorimahua subdivision
4. Dumri subdivision

==== Blocks ====
Giridih district comprises the following 13 blocks:

- Bagodar
- Bengabad
- Birni
- Deori
- Dhanwar
- Dumri
- Gandey
- Gawan
- Giridih
- Jamua
- Pirtand
- Sariya
- Tisri

== Economy ==
In 2006 the Indian government named Giridih one of the country's 250 most backward districts (out of a total of 640). It is one of the 21 districts in Jharkhand currently receiving funds from the Backward Regions Grant Fund Programme (BRGF).

The DDP of Giridih District is ₹1,97,771(2003–04) and Income Per Capita is ₹9921(2003–04).

== Divisions ==
There are six Vidhan Sabha (legislative assembly) constituencies in this district. Dhanwar, Bagodar, Jamua and Gandey assembly constituencies are part of Kodarma constituency. Giridih and Dumri assembly constituencies are part of Giridih constituency.

== Demographics ==
Historical population
Year	Pop.	±% p.a.
1901	375,866	—
1911	411,172	+0.90%
1921	407,450	−0.09%
1931	484,161	+1.74%
1941	558,821	+1.44%
1951	618,129	+1.01%
1961	747,946	+1.92%
1971	937,092	+2.28%
1981	1,161,066	+2.17%
1991	1,496,878	+2.57%
2001	1,905,343	+2.44%
2011	2,445,474	+2.53%

Religions in Giridih district (2011)
Religion	Percent
Hinduism	75.90%
Islam	20.80%
Sarna	2.42%
Christianity	0.60%
Other or not stated	0.28%

According to the 2011 census Giridih district has a population of 2,445,474 roughly equal to the nation of Kuwait or the US state of New Mexico. This gives it a ranking of 182nd in India (out of a total of 640). The district has a population density of 497 inhabitants per square kilometre (1,290/sq mi). Its population growth rate over the decade 2001-2011 was 28.33%. Giridih has a sex ratio of 943 females for every 1000 males, and a literacy rate of 63.14%. 8.51% of the population lives in urban areas. Scheduled Castes and Scheduled Tribes made up 13.31% and 9.74% of the population respectively.

Languages of Giridih district (2011)
1. Khortha (68.7%)
2. Hindi (13.6%)
3. Santali (8.99%)
4. Urdu (7.47%)
5. Others (1.29%)

At the time of the 2011 Census of India, 68.71% of the population in the district spoke Khortha, 13.55% Hindi, 8.99% Santali and 7.47% Urdu as their first language.

Khortha, a Sadani language closely related to the Nagpuri language (Sadri), is the main language spoken in Giridih district. The tribal people speak Khortha as well as Santali.

== Flora and fauna ==
The district has rich forest resources and have several jungles of sal trees and bamboos, and a variety of other indigenous trees. Among other common trees are bamboo, semal, Mahua, palash, kusum, kend, Asian pear and bhelwa. Parasnath hills have a number of plants having medicinal use. Leopards, bears, jackals, wild pigs, and hares are the wild animals found in certain parts of the district which have thick forests.

== Politics ==
District	No.	Constituency	Name	Party	Alliance		Remarks	Giridih	28	Dhanwar	Babulal Marandi	BJP	Leader of Opposition
29	Bagodar	Nagendra Mahto						Giridih				BJP	
30	Jamua	Manju Kumari						Giridih				BJP	
31	Gandey	Kalpana Soren		JMM	MGB			Giridih					
32	Giridih	Sudivya Kumar		JMM	MGB	Cabinet minister		Giridih					
33	Dumri	Jairam Kumar Mahato		JLKM	None			Giridih					

== Tourism ==
- Parasnath
- Jharkhand Dham
- Harihar Dham
- Khandoli Dam
- Usri Falls
- Sai Mandir
- Langta Baba Samadhi Sthal
- Surya Mandir, Jagarnathdih, Mirjaganj
- Rajdah dham Suriya
- Panchkero dam Gorhand
