= Usri Falls =

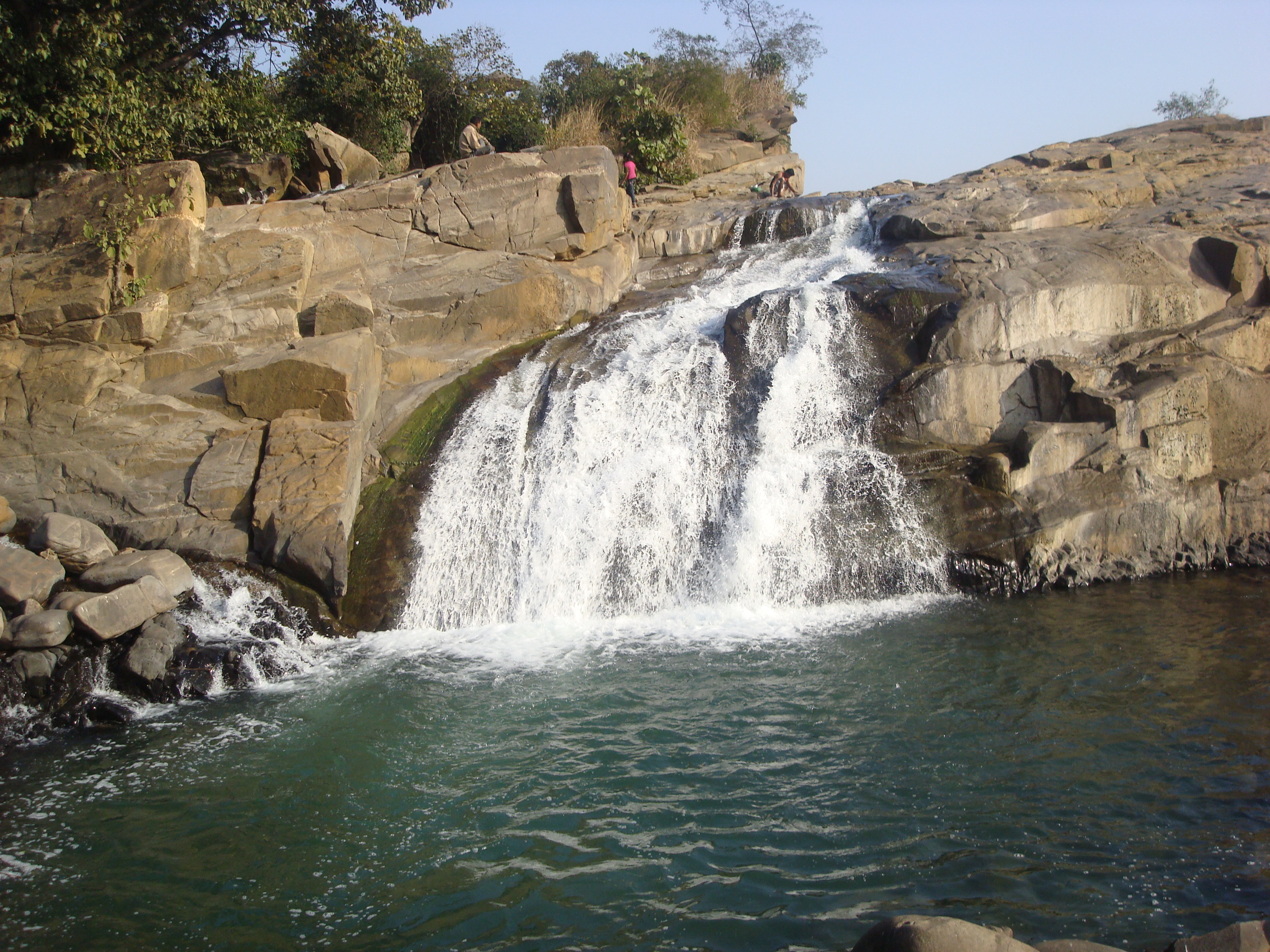
- Ushri falls

- Location within Jharkhand
- Location: Giridih district, Jharkhand, India
- Coordinates: 24°5′47″N 86°22′14″E
- Elevation: 288 metres (945 ft)
- Total height: 12 metres (39 ft)
- Number of drops: 3
- Watercourse: Usri River

Usri Falls is a waterfall located in Giridih district in the Indian state of Jharkhand. It is a popular tourist and picnic spot. Ushree means a "beautiful source".

== Geography ==
Cities, towns and locations in the Giridih district in North Chotanagpur Division
M: municipality, CT: census town, R: rural/ urban centre, H: historical/ religious/ tourist centre
Owing to space constraints in the small map, the actual locations in a larger map may vary slightly

=== Location ===
Usri Falls is located 13 kilometres (8.1 mi) east of the Giridih town on the road to Tundi. Taxis, tongas and auto-rickshaws are available.

Note: The map alongside presents some of the notable locations in the district. All places marked in the map are linked in the larger full screen map.

== Description ==
The Usri River, a tributary of the Barakar River, flows down a steep gorge. The Usri Falls drop some 12 metres (39 ft) in three separate streams. It is surrounded by dense forest.

The character of the gneissic complex of this region is well exposed. Some of the rocks have been split up into blocks of huge dimension whose polished and clean surfaces have been chequered by veins of various hues. The profile of the river bed changes after passing through the falls. The lower portion is mostly flat, slightly undulating, which gives way to gorge like form. The government has taken several steps to develop the area as a prominent tourist spot along with Khandoli Dam and Parasnath.

== See also ==
- List of waterfalls
- List of waterfalls in India
- List of waterfalls in India by height
- Giridih travel guide from Wikivoyage
