= Pertodih =

- Census Town
- Location in Jharkhand, India Pertodih (India)
- Coordinates: 24.1534°N 86.3152°E
- Country: India
- State: Jharkhand
- District: Giridih

Area
  - Total: 1.11 km^{2} (0.43 sq mi)

Population (2011)
  - Total: 5,293
  - Density: 4,770/km^{2} (12,400/sq mi)

Languages (*For language details see Giridih block#Language and religion)
  - Official: Hindi, Urdu
- Time zone: UTC+5:30 (IST)
- PIN: 815301
- Telephone/ STD code: 06532
- Lok Sabha constituency: Giridih
- Vidhan Sabha constituency: Giridih
- Website: giridih.nic.in

Pertodih is a census town in the Giridih CD block in the Giridih Sadar subdivision of the Giridih district in the Indian state of Jharkhand.

== Geography ==
Cities, towns and locations in the Giridih district in North Chotanagpur Division
M: municipality, CT: census town, R: rural/ urban centre, H: historical/ religious/ tourist centre
Owing to space constraints in the small map, the actual locations in a larger map may vary slightly

=== Location ===
Pertodih is located at 24.1534°N 86.3152°E.

=== Area overview ===
Giridih district is a part of the Chota Nagpur Plateau, with rocky soil and extensive forests. Most of the rivers in the district flow from the west to east, except in the northern portion where the rivers flow north and north west. The Pareshnath Hill rises to a height of 4,479 feet (1,365 m). The district has coal and mica mines. It is an overwhelmingly rural district with small pockets of urbanisation.

Note: The map alongside presents some of the notable locations in the district. All places marked in the map are linked in the larger full screen map.

== Demographics ==
According to the 2011 Census of India, Pertodih had a total population of 5,293, of which 2,679 (51%) were males and 2,614 (49%) were females. Population in the age range 0–6 years was 1,019. The total number of literate persons in Pertodih was 2,766 (64.72% of the population over 6 years).

Giridih Urban Agglomeration is composed of Giridih (Nagar Parishad), Paratdih (CT), Sirsia (CT), Pertodih (CT) and Dandidih (CT).

== Infrastructure ==
According to the District Census Handbook 2011, Giridih, Pertodih covered an area of 1.11 km^{2}. Among the civic amenities, it had 8 km roads with open drains, the protected water supply involved tap water from treated and untreated sources, overhead tank. It had 733 domestic electric connections, 4 road light points. Among the educational facilities it had 4 primary schools, 3 middle schools, the nearest secondary and senior secondary schools at Giridih 6 km away. Two important commodities it produced were saria production, chuna production. It had the branch office of 1 cooperative bank.
