= Bhatinda Falls =

- Bhatinda Falls
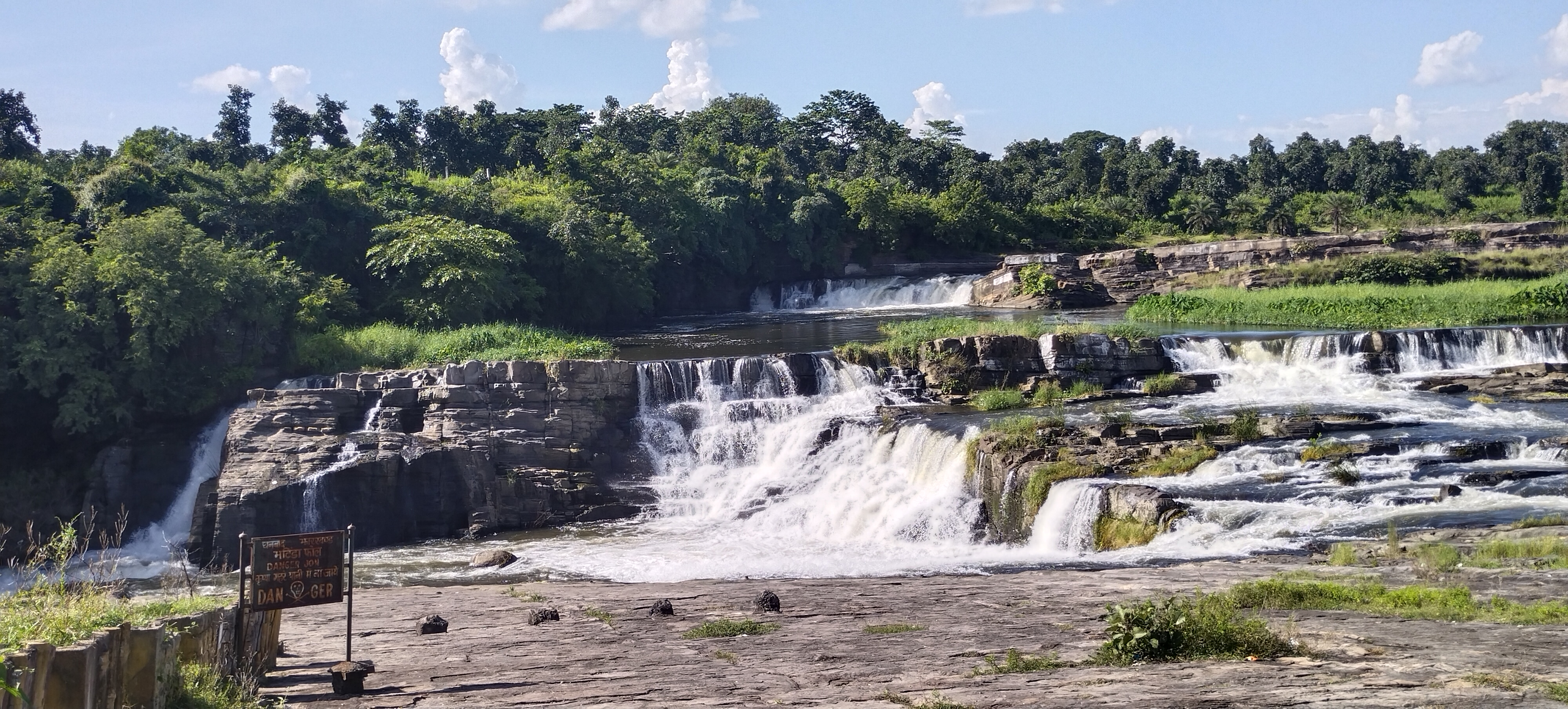
- Bhatinda Falls, Dhanbad
- Interactive map of Bhatinda Falls

Bhatinda Falls is a waterfall located in Dhanbad, Jharkhand, approximately 14 km from Dhanbad railway station. It is tucked away in the rough hillocks and verdant vegetation that surround it. The falls are surrounded by enormous boulders of rock.

== Natural environment ==
There is a confluence of two rivers near Bathinda Falls. The Katari River originates from Parasnath and flows from north to south reaching Munidih. Damodar river comes from the east. Two rivers meet near the falls. Here the rocks are inclined at an angle of 12 degrees to the river current. It is concealed among the rocky outcrops and foliage that surround it. Rock formations with gigantic stones surround the waterfall.

== Location ==
The nearest airport is Ranchi or Kolkata. Tourists can get to this location by going to Dhanbad Railway Station, which is the nearest one and is 14 km away from Bhatinda Fall. Taking an auto from Dhanbad railway station, visitors can reach the spot in less than half an hour. Many visitors come here to have picnics. This location also offers a number of restaurants and hostel in Dhanbad for visitors.

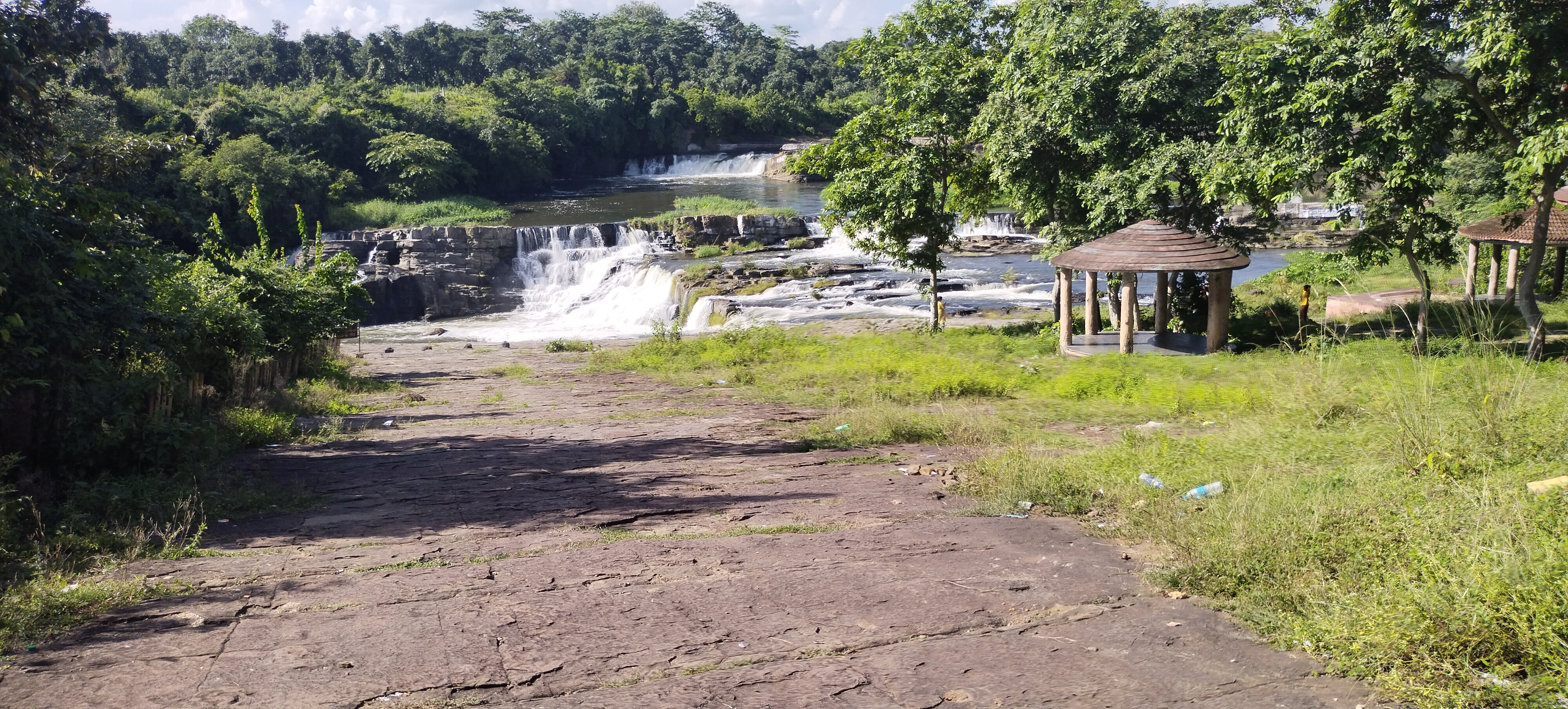

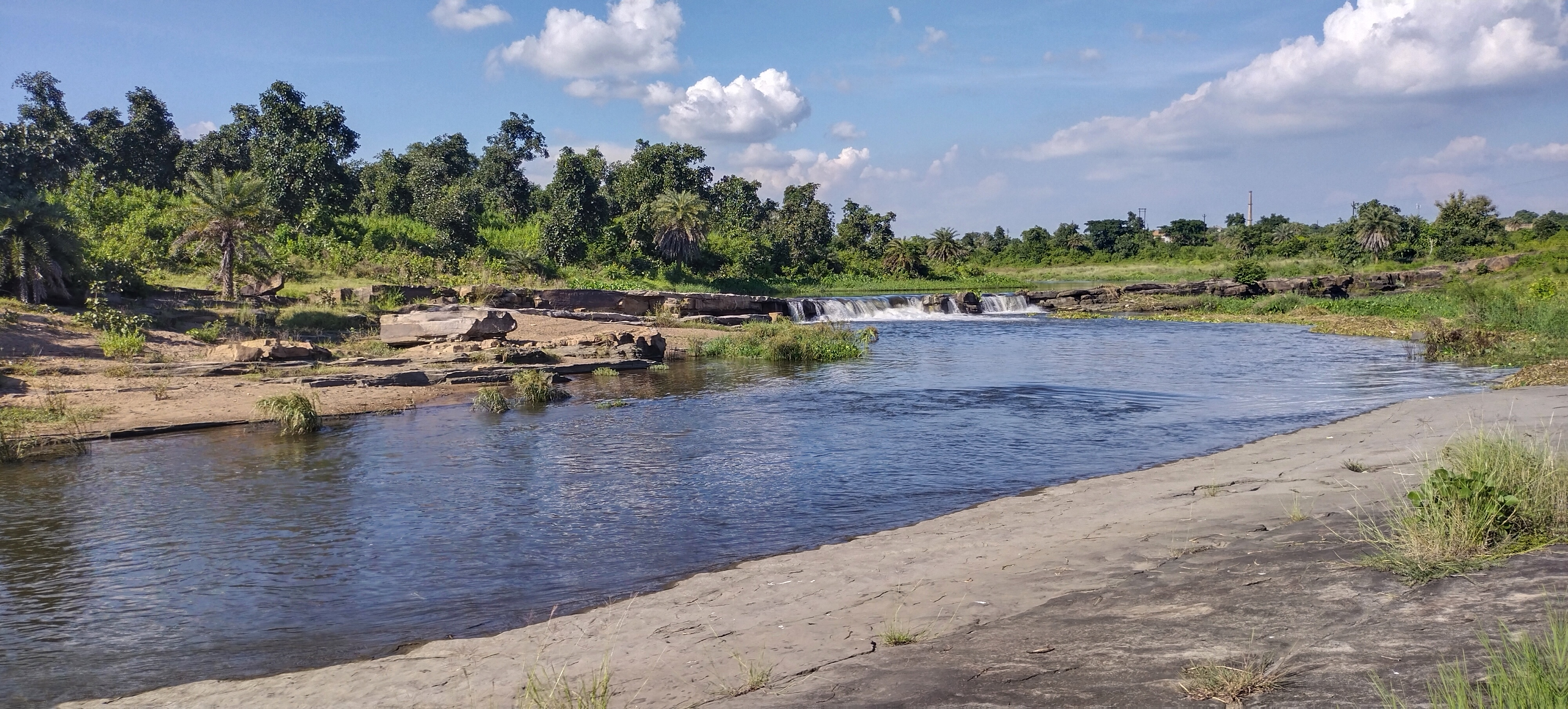

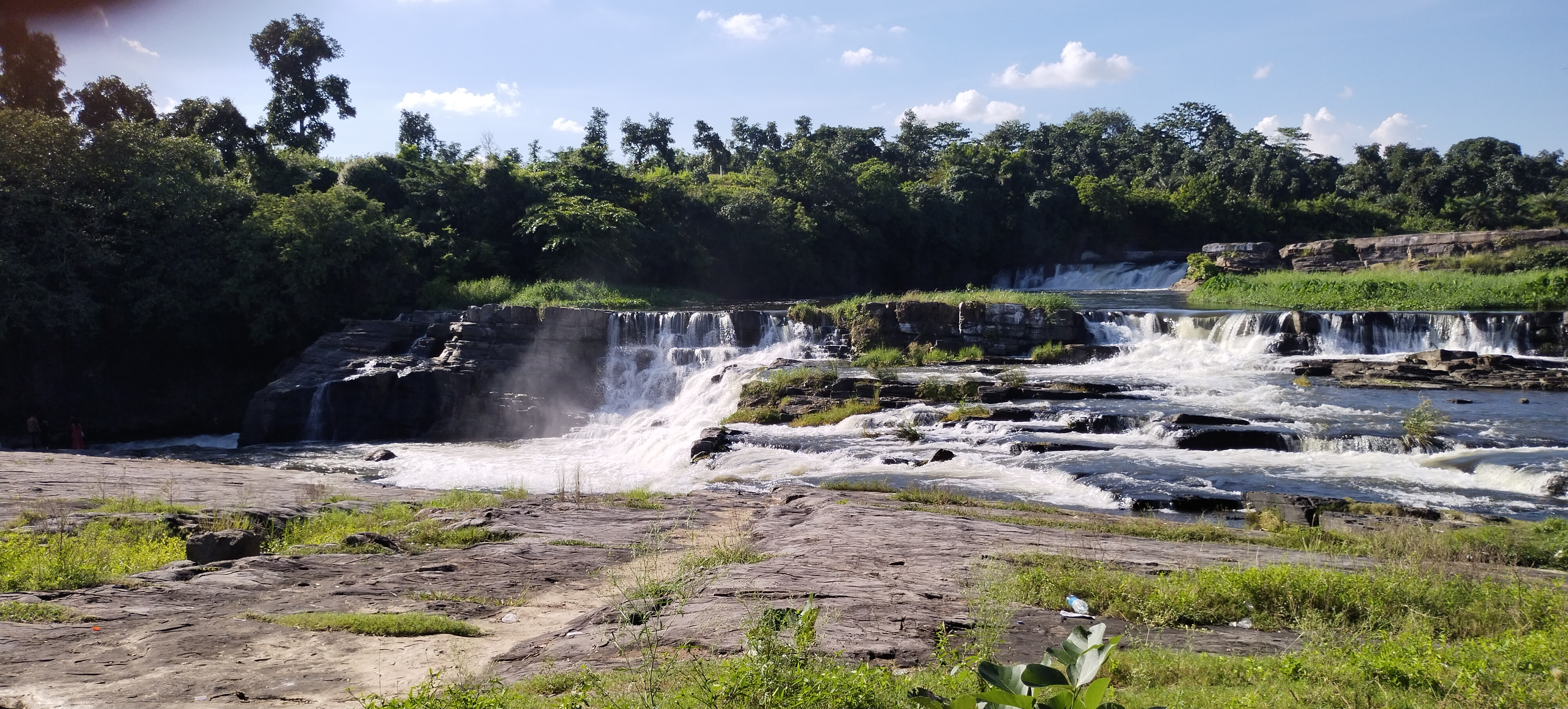

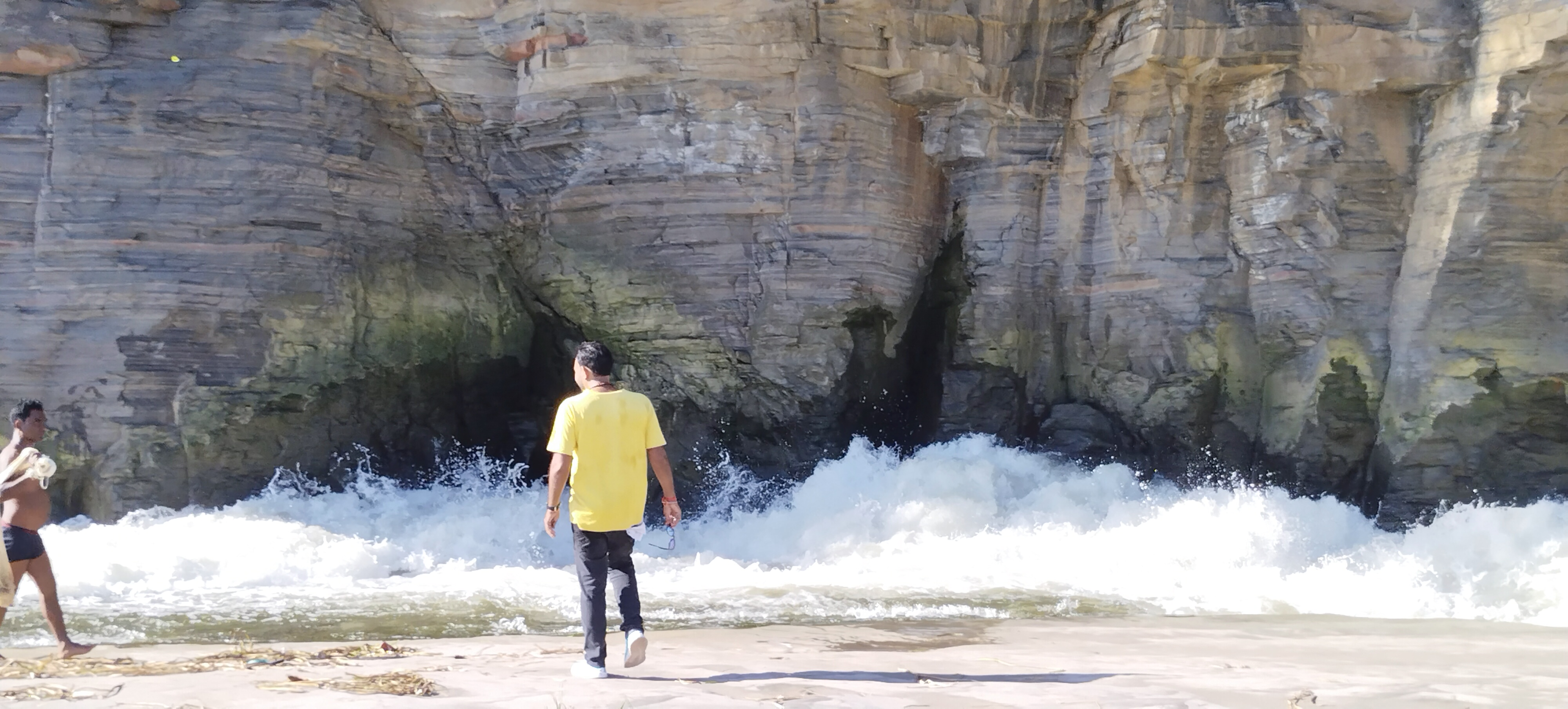
Rock
