= Telodih =

- Census Town
- Location in Jharkhand, India Telodih (India)
- Coordinates: 24.2016°N 86.2576°E
- Country: India
- State: Jharkhand
- District: Giridih

Area
  - Total: 1.6 km^{2} (0.62 sq mi)

Population (2011)
  - Total: 6,970
  - Density: 4,400/km^{2} (11,000/sq mi)

Languages (*For language details see Giridih block#Language and religion)
  - Official: Hindi, Urdu
- Time zone: UTC+5:30 (IST)
- PIN: 815302
- Telephone/ STD code: 06532
- Lok Sabha constituency: Giridih
- Vidhan Sabha constituency: Giridih
- Website: giridih.nic.in

Telodih is a census town in the Giridih CD block in the Giridih Sadar subdivision of the Giridih district in the Indian state of Jharkhand.

== Geography ==
Cities, towns and locations in the Giridih district in North Chotanagpur Division
M: municipality, CT: census town, R: rural/ urban centre, H: historical/ religious/ tourist centre
Owing to space constraints in the small map, the actual locations in a larger map may vary slightly

=== Location ===
Telodih is located at 24.2016°N 86.2576°E.

=== Area overview ===
Giridih district is a part of the Chota Nagpur Plateau, with rocky soil and extensive forests. Most of the rivers in the district flow from the west to east, except in the northern portion where the rivers flow north and north west. The Pareshnath Hill rises to a height of 4,479 feet (1,365 m). The district has coal and mica mines. It is an overwhelmingly rural district with small pockets of urbanisation.

Note: The map alongside presents some of the notable locations in the district. All places marked in the map are linked in the larger full screen map.

== Demographics ==
According to the 2011 Census of India, Telodih had a total population of 6,970, of which 3,626 (52%) were males and 3,344 (48%) were females. Population in the age range 0–6 years was 1,590. The total number of literate persons in Telodih was 3,224 (59.93% of the population over 6 years).

== Infrastructure ==
According to the District Census Handbook 2011, Giridih, Telodih covered an area of 1.6 km^{2}. Among the civic amenities, it had 10 km roads with open drains, the protected water supply involved uncovered well, hand pump. It had 972 domestic electric connections, 5 road light points. Among the educational facilities it had 7 primary schools, 1 middle school, other educational facilities at Giridih 10 km away.

== Transport ==
Salaia railway station, located nearby, is on the Madhupur-Giridih-Koderma line.
