= Maheshmunda railway station =

Railway station in Giridih, India

Maheshmunda
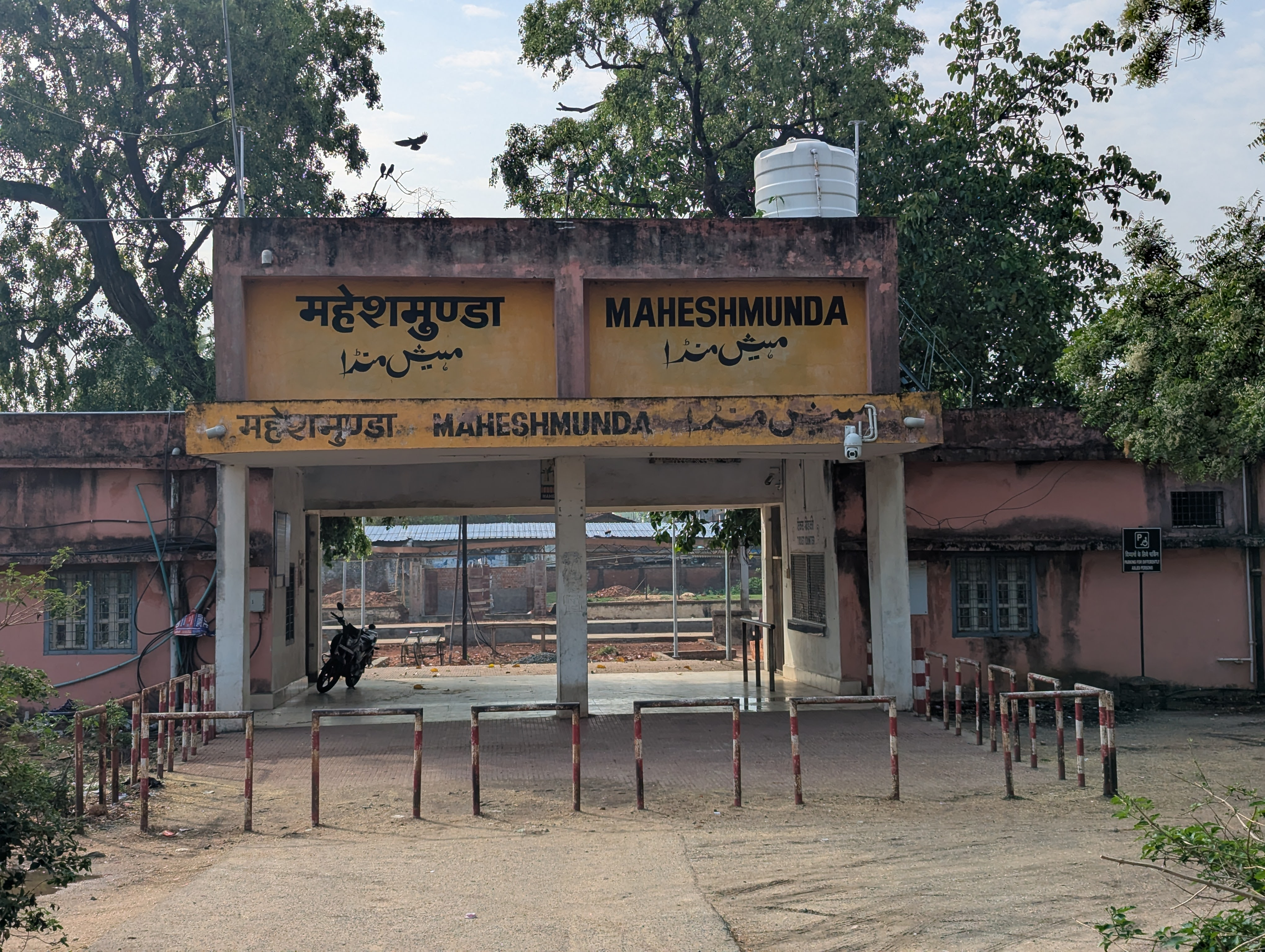

General information
- Location: Maheshmunda, Giridih district, Jharkhand; India
- Coordinates: 24°13′59″N 86°23′26″E
- Elevation: 289 metres (948 ft)
- System: Indian Railways station
- Owner: Indian Railways
- Operator: Eastern Railway
- Line: Madhupur–Giridih–Koderma line
- Platforms: 2
- Tracks: Broad gauge

Construction
- Structure type: At-grade
- Parking: Available

Other information
- Status: Active
- Station code: MMD
- Zone(s): Eastern Railway
- Division(s): Asansol
- Classification: NSG-6

History
- Opened: 1871; 155 years ago
- Rebuilt: 2020
- Electrified: 2020
- Former names: East Indian Railway
Route map
Location
- Interactive map

Maheshmunda railway station (station code: MMD) is a railway station located in Maheshmunda in the Giridih district of the Indian state of Jharkhand. It lies on the Madhupur–Giridih–Koderma railway line and serves the surrounding rural and mining regions. The station is also noted as a heritage station, retaining elements of its original colonial-era architecture and a historic railway well within its premises.

== History ==
Maheshmunda railway station was constructed in the late 19th century by the East Indian Railway Company as part of the development of the Madhupur–Giridih railway section. The station building dates to this period and retains elements of colonial-era railway architecture.

During the colonial period, a railway well located within the station premises served as a source of drinking water that was transported to the Tagore family residence at Jorasanko Thakur Bari in Kolkata. This practice has been associated with Dwarkanath Tagore.

The station still has retained parts of its original infrastructure and the well continues to be noted as a heritage feature of the site.

== Administration ==
Maheshmunda railway station is operated by the Eastern Railway zone (ER) of Indian Railways. It falls under the administrative jurisdiction of the Asansol railway division.

== Trains ==
Maheshmunda railway station is served by passenger and local trains operating on the Madhupur–Giridih–Koderma line. These services provide connectivity to nearby stations such as Madhupur, Giridih and Koderma. Long-distance express trains generally do not halt at this station.

== See also ==
- New Giridih railway station
- Madhupur–Giridih–Koderma line
- Madhupur Junction railway station
