= Giridih Sadar subdivision =

- Subdivision
- Giridih Sadar subdivision in Giridih District, Jharkhand
- Country: India
- State: Jharkhand
- District: Giridih
- Headquarters: Giridih
- Blocks: List: Bengabad Gandey Giridih

Government
  - Type: Representative democracy
  - Subdivision Officer: Shrikant Y. Vispute

Area
  - Total: 1,148.64 km^{2} (443.49 sq mi)
  - Rank: 2nd

Population (2011)
  - Total: 700,855
  - Rank: 2nd
  - Density: 610.161/km^{2} (1,580.31/sq mi)
  - Rank: 1st

Languages
  - Official: Hindi, Urdu
- Time zone: UTC+5:30 (IST)
- Website: giridih.nic.in

Giridih Sadar subdivision is an administrative subdivision of the Giridih district in the state of Jharkhand, India.

== History ==
In 1837, according to old British records, Hazaribagh district was divided into 12 police stations (thanas) of which Kharagdiha was one. Kharagdiha PS controlled the whole of what subsequently formed the Giridih subdivision, except Gawan, which had a zamindari thana, the expenses of which were not borne by the British government. A new police station was opened in 1838 at Bagodar on the then new Grand Trunk Road. In 1870, the Giridih subdivision was formed with its headquarters at Karharbari, in the heart of the coal-mining area. In 1871, the railway line from Madhupur to Giridih was laid primarily for coal transportation. At that time police stations in Giridh subdivision included Gawan, Satgawan, Jamua, Deori, Dhanwar, Birni, Giridih, Bengabad, Gandey, Dumri, Nawadih, Pirtand, and Bermo. Later on, Bagodar police station was added to the subdivision and Satgawan was deleted. Giridih district was formed on 6 December 1972. In earlier days it had two subdivisions, Giridih and Bermo. In 1991, at the time of formation of Bokaro district, Bermo subdivision, with Nawadih, Bermo, Gomia and Peterwar, was transferred to the new district.

Cities, towns and locations in the Giridih district in North Chotanagpur Division
M: municipality, CT: census town, R: rural/ urban centre, H: historical/ religious/ tourist centre
Owing to space constraints in the small map, the actual locations in a larger map may vary slightly

== Subdivisions ==
Giridih district is divided into the following administrative subdivisions:

Subdivision	Headquarters	Area km^{2} (2001)	Population (2011)	Rural population % (2011)	Urban population % (2011)
Giridih Sadar	Giridih	1148.64	700,855	93.17	6.83
Dumri	Dumri	820.15	335,521	95.23	4.77
Bagodar-Saria	Suriya	864.04	476,613	96.02	3.98
Khori Mahuwa	Khori Mahua	2020.73	932,485	98.95	1.05

== Police stations ==
Police stations in Giridih Sadar subdivision have the following features and jurisdiction:

Police station	Area covered km^{2}	Municipal town	CD Block
Giridih (S)	n/a	Giridih	-
Giridih (M)	n/a	-	Giridih
Gandey	n/a	-	Gandey
Taratanr	n/a	-	Gandey
Ahilyapur	n/a	-	Gandey
Bengabad	n/a	-	Bengabad

== Blocks ==
Community development blocks in Giridih Sadar subdivision are:

CD Block	Headquarters	Area km^{2}	Population (2011)	SC %	ST %	Hindus %	Muslims %	Literacy rate %	Census Towns
Giridih	Giridih	380.05	258,037	19.09	12.12	73.26	24.81	63.22	Telodih, Sirsia, Maheshmunda, Akdoni Khurd, Dhandidih, Paratdih and Pertodih.
Gandey	Gandey	366.09	175,087	8.01	23.75	55.67	32.42	56.30	-
Bengabad	Bengabad	402.50	153,198	14.43	17.64	71.33	18.42	50.39	-

== Education ==
Given in the table below is a comprehensive picture of the education scenario in Giridih district:

Subdivision	Primary School		Middle School		High School		Higher Secondary School		General College, Univ		Technical / Professional Instt		Non-formal Education	
Subdivision	Institution	Student	Institution	Student	Institution	Student	Institution	Student	Institution	Student	Institution	Student	Institution	Student
Giridih Sadar	590	80,952	314	33,912	50	19,187	6	11,701	2	7098	5	447	-	-
Bagodar-Saria	333	54,217	225	23,670	53	11,943	3	2,817	-	-	-	-	-	-
Dumri	342	43,033	209	18,561	27	8,901	4	6,673	-	-	-	-	-	-
Khori Mahuwa	905	133,026	508	49,979	73	24,318	8	13,067	1	1,568	-	-	-	-
Giridih district	2,170	311,228	1,256	126,122	203	64,349	21	34,258	3	8,676	5	447	-	-

Note: While Giridih district provides information that many others do not, there has been a slip. The education data for Giridih Sadar subdivision does not include data for Bengabad CD Block.

=== Educational institutions ===
There is a special institution in this subdivision:

- Jawahar Navodaya Vidyalaya was established in 1994 at Gandey. It is a co-educational residential school for children from class VI to class XII. These schools provide free high-quality education plus ample extra-curricular activities, boarding, lodging etc. for talented rural children. Navodaya Vidyalaya Samiti, an autonomous body under the HRD Ministry, Government of India, manages these schools.

The following institutions are located in Giridih Sadar subdivision:

- Giridih College, established at Giridih in 1955, offers courses at the intermediate and bachelors levels in arts, science and commerce, and Bachelor of Education. The featured courses of the college are: arts, commerce, botany, chemistry and anthropology.
- Sri Ram Krishna Mahila College, was established at New Barganda, Giridih in 1978, on property donated by Rani Mahalanobis, wife of the eminent scientist, Prasanta Chandra Mahalanobis. It offers courses in arts, science and commerce.
- Kalu Ram Modi Memorial Vananchal College is affiliated with Vinoba Bhave University.
- K.K.Verma Evening College at Bergi, Giridih is affiliated with Vinoba Bhave University.
- G.D. Bagaria Evening College at Giridih is affiliated with Vinoba Bhave University.
- Subhash Teachers Training College, GD Bagaria TT College, BN Saha DAV Teachers Training College, Scholar B.Ed. college and K.N.Bakshi College of Education are located in this subdivision.
