= Giridih block =

Giridih Girīḍīh
- Community Development Block
- Location in Giridih District
- Interactive map of Giridih
- Coordinates: 24°10′12″N 86°18′36″E
- Country: India
- State: Jharkhand
- District: Giridih
- Subdivision: Giridih Sadar
- Headquarters: Giridih
- Panchayat: 40 (2nd)

Government
  - Type: Federal democracy
  - Block Development Officer: Ganesh Rajak
  - Circle Officer: Md. Ashlam

Area
  - Total: 380.06 km^{2} (146.74 sq mi)
  - Rank: 7th
- Elevation: 298 m (978 ft)

Population (2011)
  - Total: 372,570
  - Rank: 1st
  - Density: 980.29/km^{2} (2,538.9/sq mi)
  - Rank: 1st

Languages
  - Official: Hindi, Urdu
- Time zone: UTC+5:30 (IST)
- PIN: 815301 (Giridih Town); 815302 (Giridih Other)
- Telephone/STD code: 06532
- Vehicle registration: JH-11
- Lok Sabha constituency: Giridih
- Vidhan Sabha constituency: Giridih
- Literacy: 70.12%
- Sex Ratio: 935
- Website: giridih.nic.in

Giridih is a community development block (CD block) that forms an administrative division in the Giridih Sadar subdivision of the Giridih district in the Indian state of Jharkhand.

== Overview ==
Giridih is a plateau region. The western portion of the district is part of a larger central plateau. The rest of the district is a lower plateau, a flat table land with an elevation of about 1,300 feet. At the edges, the ghats drop to about 700 feet. The Pareshnath Hills or Shikharji rises to a height of 4,480 feet in the south-eastern part of the district. The district is thickly forested. Amongst the natural resources, it has coal and mica. Inaugurating the Pradhan Mantri Ujjwala Yojana in 2016, Raghubar Das, Chief Minister of Jharkhand, had indicated that there were 23 lakh BPL families in Jharkhand. There was a plan to bring the BPL proportion in the total population down to 35%.

== Maoist activities ==
Jharkhand is one of the states affected by Maoist activities. As of 2012, Giridih was one of the 14 highly affected districts in the state.As of 2016, Giridih was identified as one of the 13 focus areas by the state police to check Maoist activities. In 2017, the Moists, in Giridih district, have torched more than 50 vehicles engaged in road construction or carrying goods.

== Geography ==
Paratdih, a constituent census town of Giridih CD block, is located at 24°10′12″N 86°18′36″E.

Giridih CD block is bounded by Jamua and Bengabad CD blocks on the north, Gandey CD block on the east, Tundi CD block, in Dhanbad district, across the Barakar River, Pirtand and Dumri CD blocks on the south and Birni CD Block on the west.

Giridih CD block has an area of 404.55 km^{2}. It has 40 gram panchayats, 211 inhabited villages and 7 census towns. Giridih police station serves this block. Headquarters of this CD block is at Giridih. 29.45% of the area has forest cover.

Rivers in Giridih CD block are Barakar, Pathri, Kurgi, Usri and Khaki.

Gram panchayats in Giridih CD block are: Pahadpur, Sindwariya, Leda, Bajto, Algunda, Senadoni, Jitpur, Badgunda Khurd, Berdonga, Palmo, Barhmoriya, Karharbari, Telodih, Khawa, Pindatand, Sikdardih, Parsatand, Maheshlundi, Akdoni Kala, Matrukha, Purnanagar, Chunjka, Akdoni Khurd, Yogitand, Baxidih, Chaitadih, Bhandardih, Sihodih, Sirsiya, Pandeydih, Mangrodih, Paratdih, Patrodih, Dadidih, Harsinghraidih, Udnabad, Mohanpur, Gadi Srirampur, Jaspur and Fulchi.

== Demographics ==
=== Population ===
According to the 2011 Census of India Giridih CD block had a total population of 258,037, of which 208,260 were rural and 49,777 were urban. There were 133,345 (52%) males and 124,692 (48%) females. Population in the age range 0–6 years was 49,452. Scheduled Castes numbered 49,252 (19.09%) and Scheduled Tribes numbered 31,267 (12.12%).

Census towns in Giridih CD block were (2011 figures in brackets): Telodih (6,970), Sirsia (7,181), Maheshmunda (7,389), Akdoni Khurd (6,321), Dandidih (7,769), Paratdih (8,854) and Pertodih (5,293).

=== Literacy ===
As of 2011 census the total number of literate persons in Giridih CD block was 131,865 (63.22% of the population over 6 years) out of which males numbered 80,135 (74.29% of the male population over 6 years) and females numbered 51,730 (51.36% of the female population over 6 years). The gender disparity (the difference between female and male literacy rates) was 22.93%.

As of 2011 census, literacy in Giridih district was 63.14% Literacy in Jharkhand was 66.41% in 2011. Literacy in India in 2011 was 74.04%.

See also – List of Jharkhand districts ranked by literacy rate

Literacy in CD Blocks of
Giridih district
Giridih subdivision
Giridih - 63.22%
Gandey - 56.30%
Bengabad - 59.33%
Dumri subdivision
Dumri - 63.55%
Pirtand - 47.22%
Bagodar Saria subdivision
Bagodar - 64.43%
Suriya - 66.25%
Birni - 61.47%
Khori Mahua subdivision
Dhanwar - 65.44%
Jamua - 63.99%
Deori - 62.54%
Tisri - 55.27%
Gawan - 60.94 %
Source: 2011 Census: CD Block Wise
Primary Census Abstract Data

=== Language and religion ===
Religions in Giridih CD block (2011)
| Religion | Percent |
| Hinduism | 73.26% |
| Islam | 24.81% |
| Other* | 0.80% |
| Christianity | 0.70% |
| Other or not stated | 0.43% |
*mainly tribal religions like Sarna

Languages of Giridih block (2011)
1. Khortha (46.7%)
2. Hindi (24.1%)
3. Urdu (19.1%)
4. Santali (7.67%)
5. Others (2.42%)

Khortha is the main spoken language. Hindi is the official language. Urdu and Santali are also spoken.

== Rural poverty ==
40-50% of the population of Giridih district were in the BPL category in 2004–2005, being in the same category as Godda, Koderma and Hazaribagh districts. Rural poverty in Jharkhand declined from 66% in 1993–94 to 46% in 2004–05. In 2011, it has come down to 39.1%.

== Economy ==
=== Livelihood ===
Livelihood
in Giridih CD block
1. Cultivators (18.1%)
2. Agricultural labourers (22.2%)
3. Household industries (3.86%)
4. Other Workers (55.8%)

In Giridih CD block in 2011, amongst the class of total workers, cultivators numbered 12,706 and formed 18.11%, agricultural labourers numbered 15,571 and formed 22.20%, household industry workers numbered 2,706 and formed 3.86% and other workers numbered 39,159 and formed 55.83%. Total workers numbered 70,142 and formed 33.68% of the rural population, and non-workers numbered 138,118 and formed 66.32% of the population.

Note: In the census records a person is considered a cultivator, if the person is engaged in cultivation/ supervision of land owned. When a person who works on another person's land for wages in cash or kind or share, is regarded as an agricultural labourer. Household industry is defined as an industry conducted by one or more members of the family within the household or village, and one that does not qualify for registration as a factory under the Factories Act. Other workers are persons engaged in some economic activity other than cultivators, agricultural labourers and household workers. It includes factory, mining, plantation, transport and office workers, those engaged in business and commerce, teachers, entertainment artistes and so on.

=== Infrastructure ===
There are 211 inhabited villages in Giridih CD block. In 2011, 86 villages had power supply. 32 villages had tap water (treated/ untreated), 200 villages had well water (covered/ uncovered), 193 villages had hand pumps, and all villages had drinking water facility. 34 villages had post offices, 15 villages had a sub post office, 12 villages had telephones (land lines) and 81 villages had mobile phone coverage. 205 villages had pucca (paved) village roads, 17 villages had bus service (public/ private), 31 villages had autos/ modified autos, and 81 villages had tractors. 21 villages had bank branches, 9 villages had agricultural credit societies, no village had cinema/ video halls, 1 village had public library and public reading room. 78 villages had public distribution system, 6 villages had weekly haat (market) and 125 villages had assembly polling stations.

=== Agriculture ===
Hills occupy a large portion of Giridih district. The soil is generally rocky and sandy and that helps jungles and bushes to grow. The forest area, forming a large portion of total area, in the district is evenly distributed all over. Some areas near the rivers have alluvial soil. In Giridih CD block, the percentage of cultivable area to total area is 42.31%. The percentage of cultivable area to the total area for the district, as a whole, is 27.04%. Irrigation is inadequate. The percentage of irrigated area to cultivable area in Giridih CD block is 2.63%. May to October is the Kharif season, followed by the Rabi season. Rice, sown in 50% of the gross sown area, is the main crop in the district. Other important crops grown are: maize, wheat, sugar cane, pulses and vegetables.

=== Giridih coalfield ===
Giridih CD block covers a major part of coal mining activity in the district. The East Indian Railway Company started coal mining in Giridih Coalfield in 1871 to meet its own requirements. The oldest coal mine in Chotanagpur, covering an area of 28.47 km^{2}., is located near the town of Giridih.

=== Backward Regions Grant Fund ===
Giridih district is listed as a backward region and receives financial support from the Backward Regions Grant Fund. The fund created by the Government of India is designed to redress regional imbalances in development. As of 2012, 272 districts across the country were listed under this scheme. The list includes 21 districts of Jharkhand.

== Transport ==
National Highway 114A, running from Rampurhat on NH 14 to Dumri on NH 19 (old NH2)/ Grand Trunk Road and State Highway 13 (Jharkhand), running from Koderma to Gobindpur on NH 16, crosses at Giridih.

Madhupur-Giridih-Koderma line passes through this block. Giridih railway station is on this line. Other railway stations in Giridih are: Krishna Ballabh Sahay Halt and Maheshmunda.

== Education ==
Giridih CD block had 59 villages with pre-primary schools, 176 villages with primary schools, 81 villages with middle schools, 9 villages with secondary schools, 4 villages with senior secondary schools, 30 villages with no educational facility.
.*Senior secondary schools are also known as Inter colleges in Jharkhand

== Healthcare ==
Giridih CD block had 3 villages with primary health centres, 28 villages with primary health subcentres, 16 villages with maternity and child welfare centres, 3 villages with allopathic hospitals, 9 villages with dispensaries, 9 villages with family welfare centres, 16 villages with medicine shops.
.*Private medical practitioners, alternative medicine etc. not included
