= Giridih Coalfield =

- Location in Jharkhand
- Location: Jharkhand, India; 24°9′N 86°18′E
- Company: Central Coalfields Limited
- Website: http://ccl.gov.in/
- Acquired: 1975

Giridih Coalfield is located in Giridih district in the Indian state of Jharkhand.

== History ==
Coal mining activities were initiated in Giridih by private owners in 1857, making it the earliest coal mine in Bihar/Jharkhand. East Indian Railway started organised mining in 1896. The ownership of the coalfield was handed over to the state collieries in 1936 and then transferred to National Coal Development Corporation in 1956. Following nationalization of the coal industry it became a part of Coal India Limited in 1975.

== Coalfield ==
Giridih Coalfield is spread over an area of 28.5 km^{2} (11.0 sq mi). It has 20 seams. The Lower Karhabari seam, 3 to 7.5 m (9.8 to 24.6 ft) thick, has the finest coking coal in India. Other important seams are Upper Karhabari and Bandhua seams. The reserves are estimated at 17.3 million tonnes. The Giridih Coalfield is typical of Karhabari formation. It has low moisture (1.40-1.80%), low ash content (9-12.6%), low in sulphur (0.5%) and phosphorus (0.01%). The coalfield is located around Beniadih, in Giridih block, south of Giridih.

== See also ==
- Coal mining in India
- Coal India
- Bharat Coking Coal
