= Carmel School, Giridih =

School in Jharkhand, Northern Province, India

Location
- Alkapuri; Giridih, Jharkhand, Northern Province, 815301; India; 24.1935°N 86.2894°E

Information
- School type: Co-educational Convent
- Religious affiliation: Catholic
- Founded: 1954; 72 years ago
- Founder: Mother Teresa of St. Rose of Lima
- Status: Active
- School board: I.C.S.E ISC
- School district: Giridih
- Authority: Carmelite Sisters of St. Teresa (CSST)
- Session: 2023–2024
- Principal: Theresilda, C.S.S.T
- Head teacher: Nirmal Kumar Jha
- Age: 2.5 yrs to 18 yrs
- Classes offered: Nursery–12
- Language: English
- Classrooms: 80 (Approximately)
- Houses: Rose, Shamrock, Sunflower, Violet
- Colours: Sky blue, navy, and black
- Fight song: Carmel School Anthem
- Athletics: 800 m, 400 m, 200 m, 100 m, relay, shot put, discus, football, basketball, athletics, kho kho
- Affiliations: I.C.S.E
- Website: carmelschoolgiridih.com

Carmel School (also known as Carmel Convent School, Giridih) is a private Catholic school located in the Giridih district of Jharkhand, India. The school provides a hostel for girls. The boys attend the school as day scholars. The pupils of Carmel School are referred to as Carmelites. Carmel School also has a neighbouring branch known as Carmel Hindi Medium School, that provides education to pupils with a Hindi curriculum.

== History ==
The school was founded in 1954 by the Carmelite Sisters of St. Teresa (CSST) a community started by Mother Teresa of St. Rose of Lima. The school was the first in the region to impart education in English medium to pupils. As of July 2019, Sr Divya is the principal of the school.

== Nature ==
The school is owned and administered by the Carmelite Sisters of St. Teresa, Northern Province. The school is affiliated to the Council for the Indian School Certificate Examinations, New Delhi, and prepares the pupils for the ICSE and the ISC board examinations for class X and class XII respectively.

== Curriculum ==
The school is affiliated to the Council for the Indian School Certificate Examinations, New Delhi, and prepares the pupils for the ICSE board examination for class X. It provides education up to 12th standard with the ISC Board. Admission for new pupils starts from December and the new session start from the second half of March. It is co-educational and instruction is primarily in English. There are separate kindergarten, primary, higher and senior secondary sections in the campus.
