= Khandoli Dam =

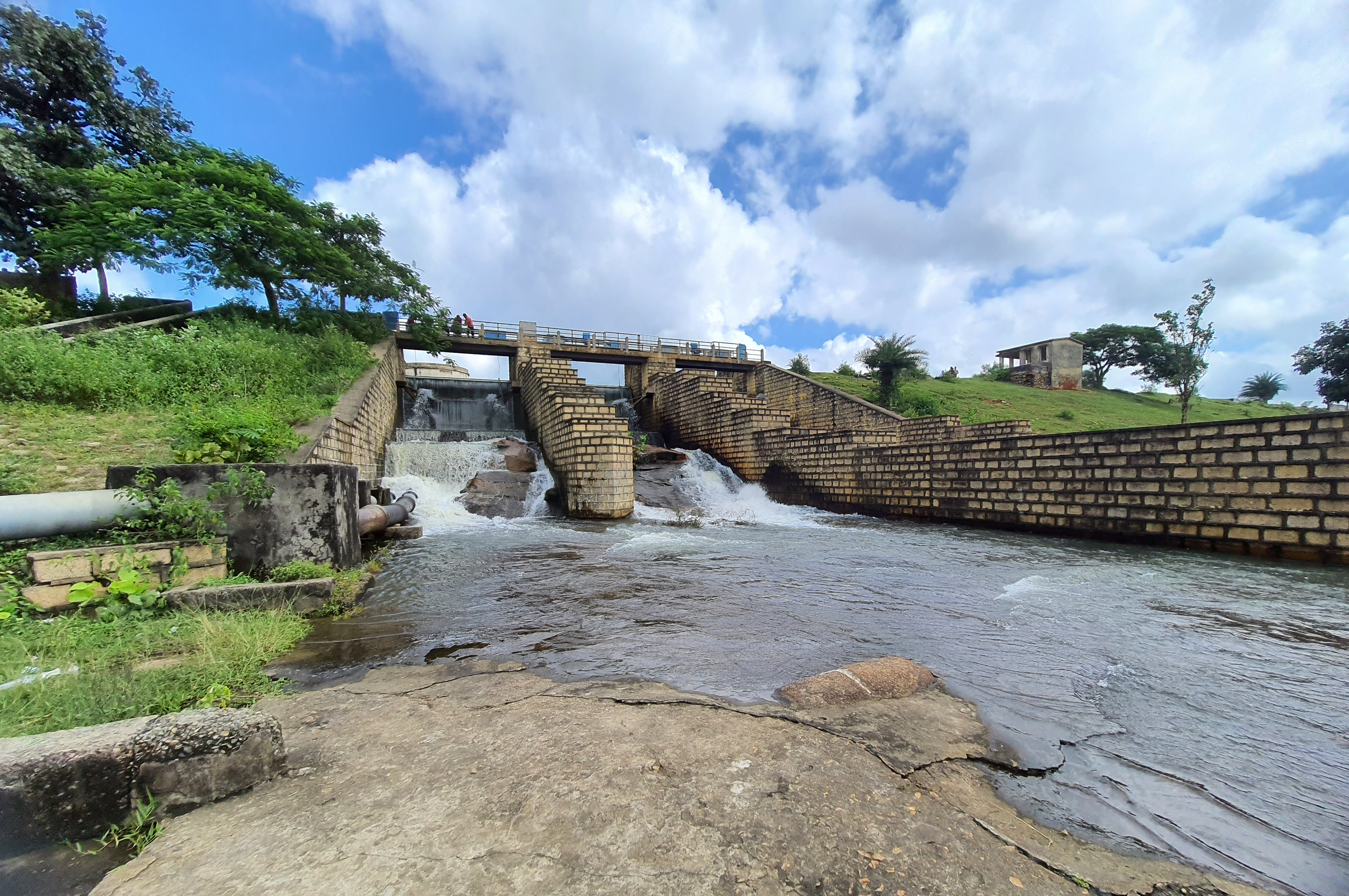

- Location in Jharkhand
- Official name: Khandoli Dam
- Country: India
- Location: Giridih, Jharkhand
- Coordinates: 24°14′22″N 86°20′55″E
- Status: Functional
- Construction began: 1955
- Opening date: 1957
- Owner: spot palace

Dam and spillways
- Height: 51 feet (16 m)
- Length: 2,718 feet (828 m)
- Spillways: 3
- Spillway capacity: 60 feet (18 m) clear Width

Reservoir
- Creates: Khandoli Lake
- Total capacity: 6,300 acre-feet (7,800,000 m^{3})

Khandoli Dam (Hindi: खंडोली डैम) is a dam located 10 km North-East of Giridih town towards Bengabad in Jharkhand, India. Khandoli is also an important tourist spot at the foot of the Khandoli hill. The reservoir of the Khandoli dam provides water supply to more than one lakh residents of the Giridih city.

Recently the urban development department has made plans to desilt the Khandoli lake after decades.

== Wildlife ==
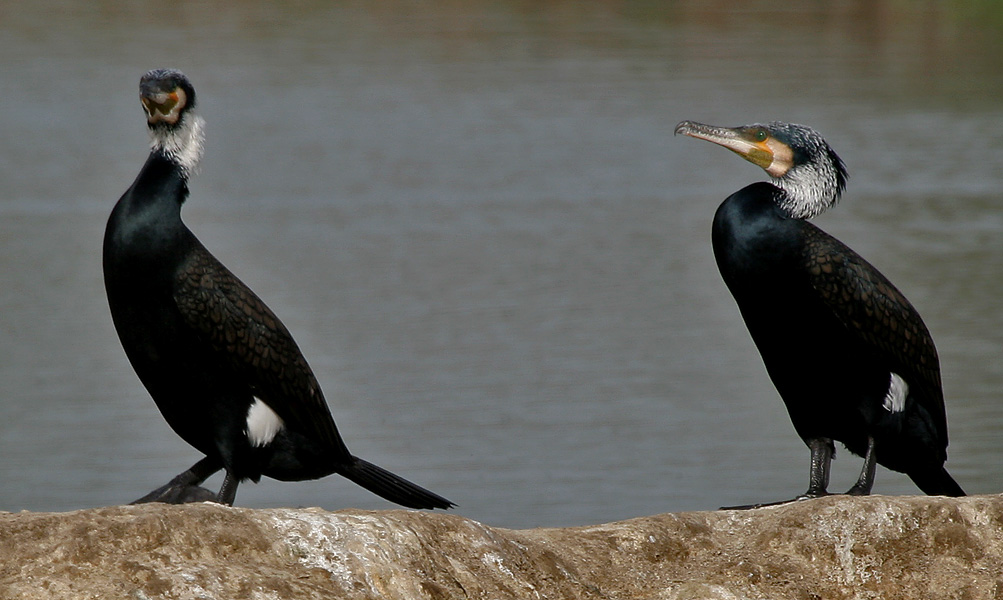
Great cormorant

Every year thousands of migratory birds arrive at Khandoli lake by travelling thousands of kilometres from northern Asia, Himalayan belt, Africa and Australia. Great cormorant, Siberian duck, Siberian crane, brahminy shelduck (ruddy shelduck), bar-headed goose, and mallards are among the species that migrate to the dam for breeding. The migration of birds generally begins from the second week of November every year for a warmer climate and return around March. As many as forty different species of birds come to Khandoli but their number has reduced over the years mainly due to pollution and poaching. Some animals such as rabbit, guinea pig, peacock, owls etc. are also kept in cages in the amusement park.

== Tourism ==
Khandoli has been developed as a tourism attraction by district tourism department. The number of tourists increase in the winter months for bird-watching due to the presence of migratory birds in the area. An amusement park spread over 6 acres (2.4 ha) is built near the lake which offers joy rides in toy train and swings. Elephant and camel safaris and numbers of other amusement facilities are available. A canteen is available for convenience of the tourists. A watch tower and 600 feet high hillock gives a view of Khandoli.

=== Adventure sports ===
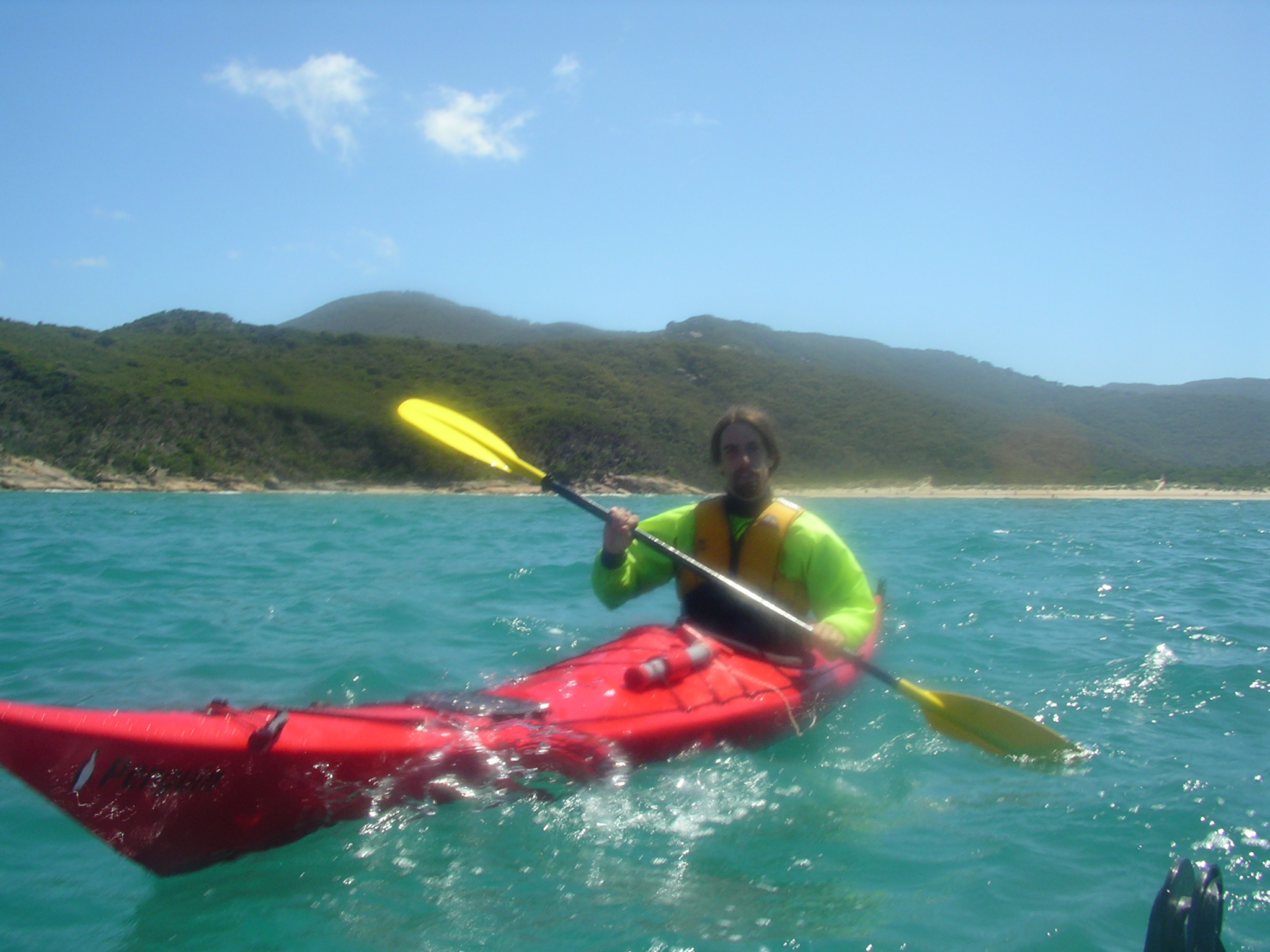
Kayaking

Khandoli is a popular spot for aerial, mountaineering and water related adventure sports owing to the physical and the relief features of the area. Aerial adventure activities include hot air ballooning, paragliding and parasailing from both land and water. Khandoli Hill with its vast range of granite rocks with various shapes, offer varied challenges to rock climbers in rock climbing, rappelling, river Crossing (zip-line), trekking. The reservoir of Khandoli dam (Khandoli lake) is used by pedal boats, speed boats and water scooters for water related adventure activities such as scuba diving, rafting, canoeing, sailing, kayaking, ringo ride, waterskiing and surfing. Khandoli is also used to impart training in water sports at national level.

These adventure sports attract tourists from across country. Large number of tourists from Mumbai, Kolkata, Burdwan, Orissa and Bihar arrive to engage in water sports. The Khandoli area has been leased by the administration for further development for tourism.

External videos
- Video of Khandoli by Dept. of Tourism, Jharkhand Govt showing the Khandoli lake, hill, amusement park, flora and fauna
