= Giridih =

Giridih Girīḍīh
- City
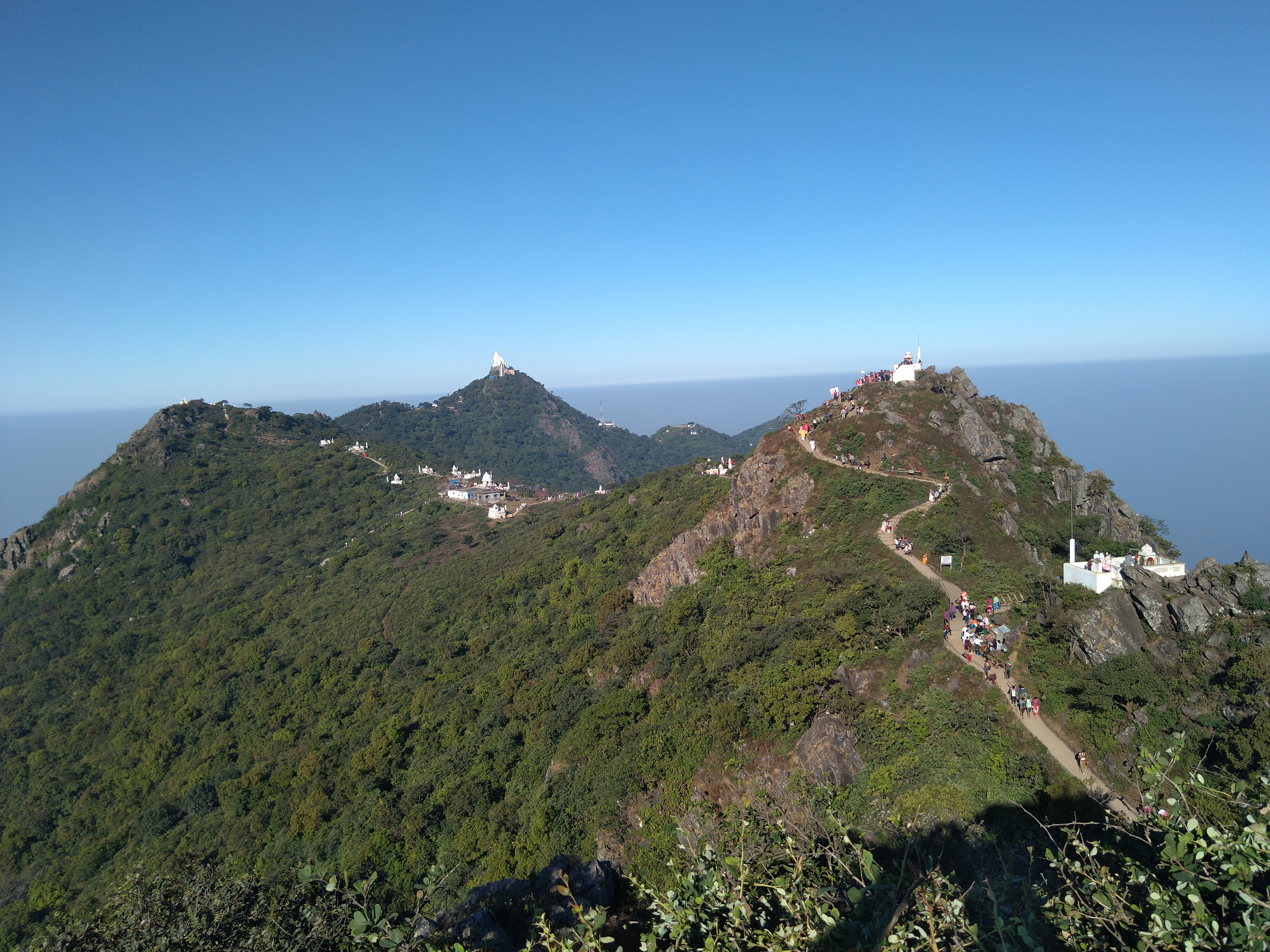
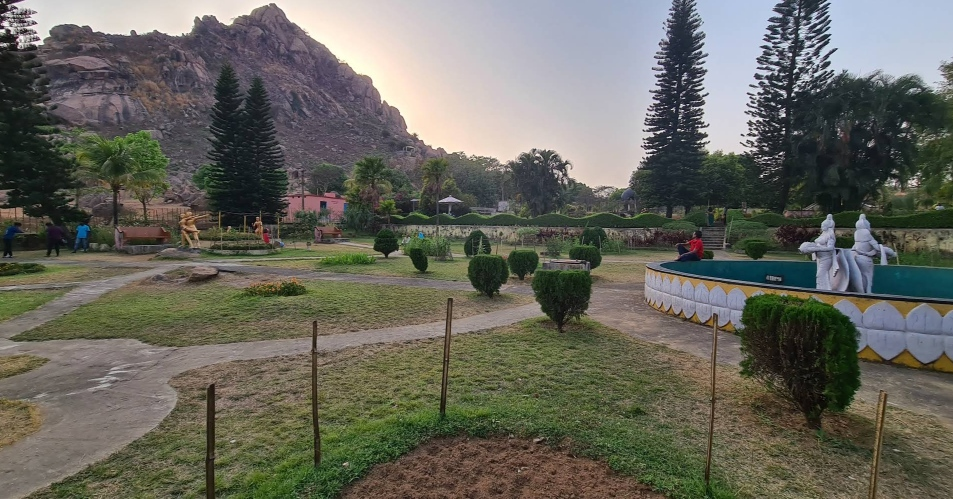
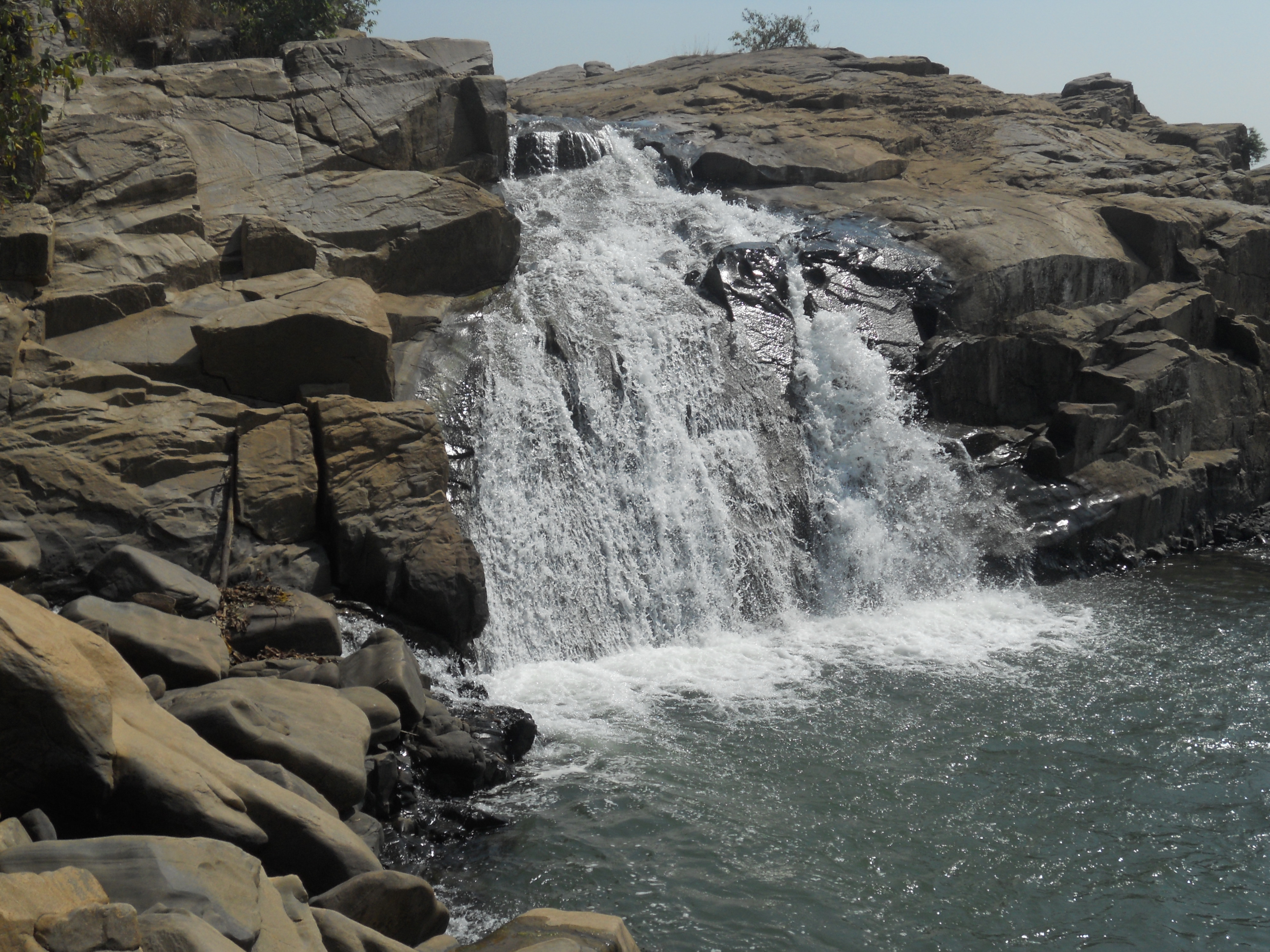
- from the top: Parasnath Hill, Khandoli Dam-cum-Park, Usri Falls
- Nickname: Land of Hills
- Coordinates: 24°11′12.558″N 86°18′21.011″E
- Country: India
- State: Jharkhand
- District: Giridih district
- Block: Giridih
- Named for: giri

Government
  - Type: Municipal Corporation
  - Body: Giridih Municipal Corporation
  - Mayor: Pramila Mehra (JMM)
  - Deputy Mayor: Sumit Kumar (JMM)

Area
  - Total: 87.4 km^{2} (33.7 sq mi)
- Elevation: 289 m (948 ft)

Population (2011)
  - Total: 143,529
  - Density: 1,640/km^{2} (4,250/sq mi)

Languages (Note: For language details see Giridih block#Language and religion)
  - Official: Hindi
- Time zone: UTC+5:30 (IST)
- PIN: 815301
- Telephone code: 0-6532
- Vehicle registration: JH-11
- Website: www.giridih.nic.in

Giridih (Note: Hindi: Girīḍīh, pronounced [ɡɪ.rɪˈɖiːɦ]) is headquarters of the Giridih district of Jharkhand state, India. The city of Giridih is known for its industrial and health sectors, as well as its scenery. Giridih houses the Giridih Coalfield which is one of the oldest coalfields to be worked in India. Giridih is one of the six Data Processing Centres of Data Processing Division (DPD) of National Sample Survey Office (NSSO). Before 1972, Giridih was part of Hazaribagh district.

== Etymology ==
The literal meaning of Giridih is the land of hills and hillocks – giri, a Sanskrit word, means hills and dih, another word of the local Khortha dialect, means land of.

== History ==
Giridih was a part of Kharagdiha till late 18th century. Kharagdiha was founded in 15th century when the then Maharaja was able to influence and impress the Ghatwals of Kharagdiha Gadis. The Hazaribagh Gazetteer describes this kingdom 600 miles long which spread from Hazaribagh to Gaya. The Kharagdiha gadis were semi-independent chiefdoms. All that the ruler of the Gadi had to do on succession was to acknowledge the supremacy of the Kharagdiha Maharaja. Koderma, Palganj, Ledo, Ghoranji, Srerampur, and Sirsia were notable gadis.

During the British Raj, Kharagdiha became a part of Jungle Terry. The Gadis of Kharagdiha were permanently settled and they became Zamindari estates. The rulers of Kharagdiha were separately settled the zamindari estate of Raj Dhanwar in 1809. There was a total of 84 divisions of Kharagdiha called gadis, but 33 of these were transferred to other perganas, there were only 51 of these left who paid their rent through 36 toujis, and all of the gadidars/ ghatwals received mokarari Pattas from the Collector at different times. And in 1809, the remainder of Kharagdiha Perganan consisting of 54 villages was settled permanently with Girwar Narayan Deo on a revenue of Rs 5,226-12-10. This completed the settlement of Kharagdiha by creating 50 mukarrari gadis/ mahals and one permanently settled estate. Subsequently, the pargana contained, among its various classes of landholding, 20 Shamilat Taluks and 58 further Mukarrari Taluks created under written engagements, by 1877.

Subsequent to the Kol uprising in 1831 that, did not seriously affect Hazaribag, however, the administrative structure of the territory was changed. The parganas of Ramgarh, Kharagdiha, Kendi and Kunda became parts of the South-West Frontier Agency and were formed into a division named Hazaribag as the administrative headquarters.

In 1854, the designation of South-West Frontier Agency was changed to Chota Nagpur Division and it began to be administered as a Non-regulation province under the Lieutenant Governor of the then Bihar. In 1855-56 there was the great uprising of the Santhals against the British but was brutally suppressed.

Giridih district was created on December 4, 1972 by carving some parts of Hazaribagh district. In 1999 part of it became Bokaro district.

It is currently a part of the Red Corridor.

== Geography ==
Cities, towns and locations in the Giridih district in North Chotanagpur Division
M: municipality, CT: census town, R: rural/ urban centre, H: historical/ religious/ tourist centre
Owing to space constraints in the small map, the actual locations in a larger map may vary slightly

=== Location ===
Giridih is located at 24.18°N 86.3°E. It has an average elevation of 289 metres (948 ft). Śrī Sammed Shikharji also known as the Parasnath Hills, located in Giridih district is the highest mountain peak in Jharkhand. It is a conical granite peak located 4,477 feet (1,365 metres) above the sea level.

Note: The map alongside presents some of the notable locations in the district. All places marked in the map are linked in the larger full screen map.

== Government and politics ==
Nageshwar Prasad Sinha was the first MP from Giridih when the town declared as a separate district from Hazaribagh. Ravindra Kumar Pandey from the Bharatiya Janata Party won the 2014 Indian general election from Giridih (Lok Sabha constituency) and Chandra Prakash Choudhary is the present Member of Parliament. Giridih city forms the Giridih (Vidhan Sabha constituency).

== Transport ==
=== Rail ===
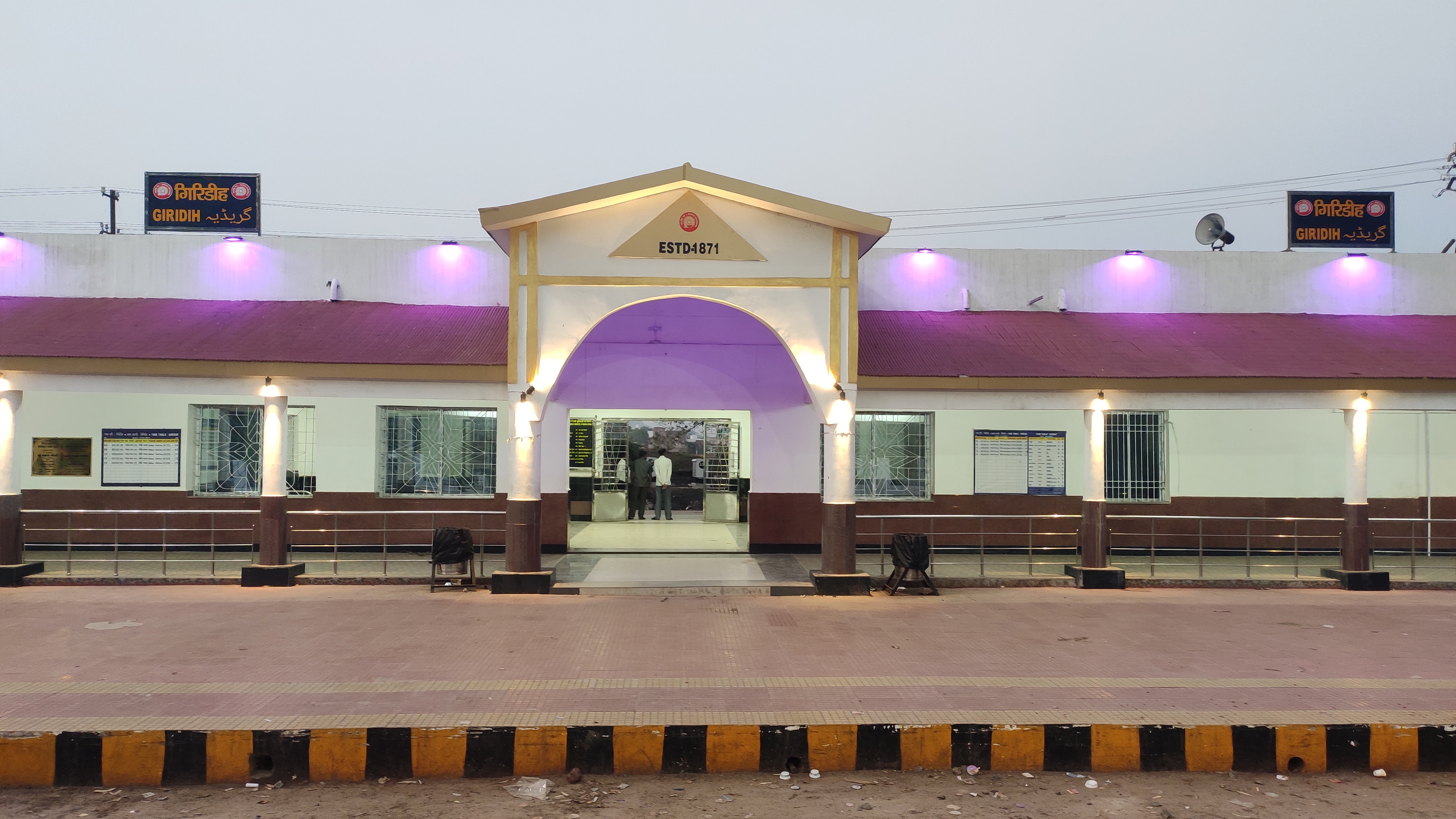
Giridih railway station

Giridih railway station (GRD) is connected to Madhupur Junction (MDP) located 38 km to the east by a single broad gauge railway line. There is a single passenger train which runs five times a day between the two stations and takes about an hour to reach Giridih. Giridih is under the administration of the Asansol division of the Eastern Railway zone of Indian Railways.

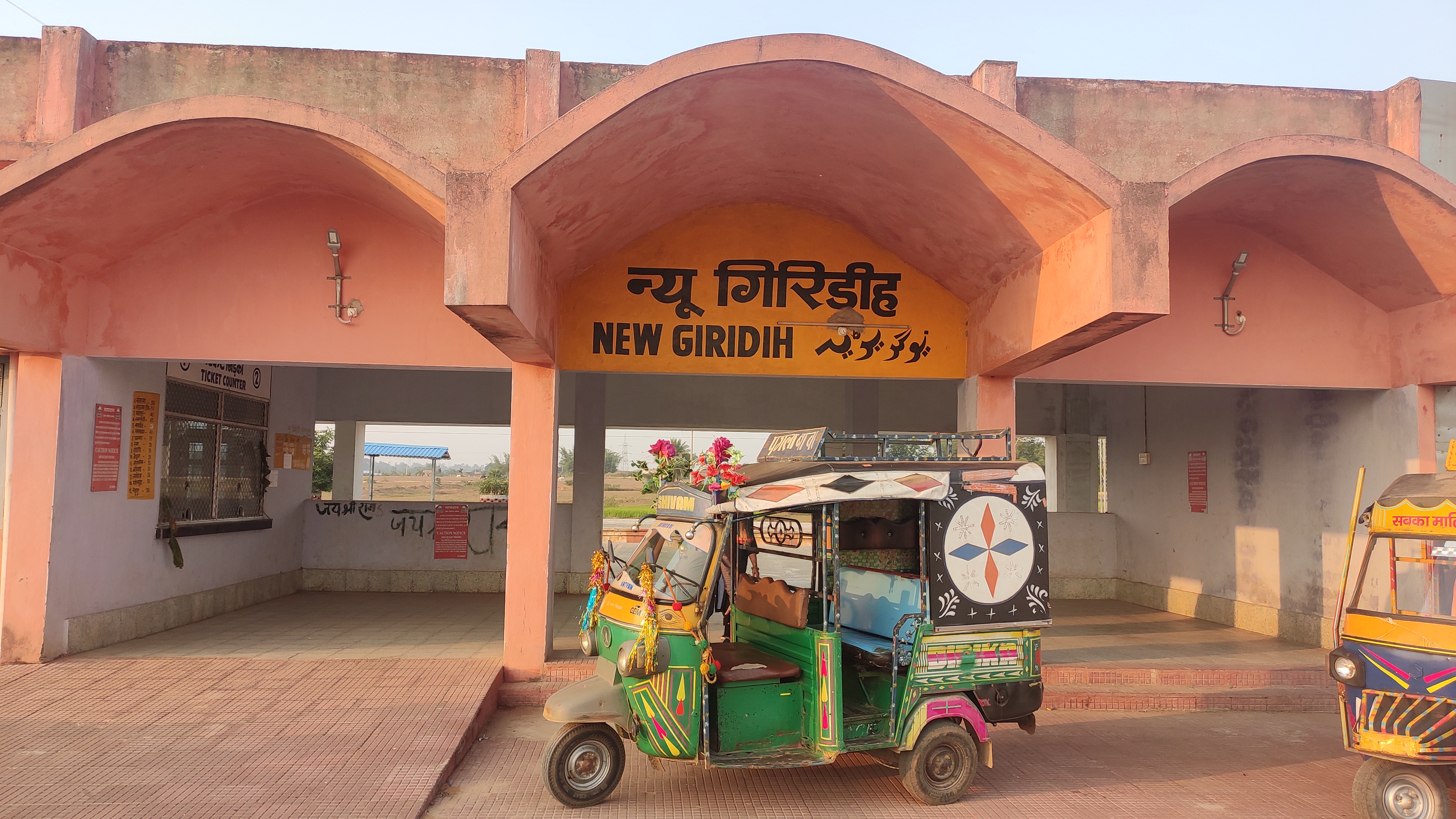
New Giridih railway station

New Giridih railway station (NGRH) lies to the north of Giridih city in Gadi. It became operational after the railway line between Koderma Junction (KQR) and Maheshmunda (MMD) was completed, and is under the administration of the Dhanbad division of the Eastern Central Railway zone. Presently train is ferrying once between Koderma and Maheshmunda and once between Koderma and Madhupur via New Giridih.

Parasnath railway station (PNME), on the Howrah-Delhi grand chord line, is 48 km from Giridih towards south-west in Isri and is under the administration of the Dhanbad division of the Eastern Central Railway zone.

A new rail line is proposed between New Giridih and Parasnath via Madhuban to cater to the needs of locals and Jain Tourists coming to Madhuban, Parasnath. There are other proposals as well to connect New Giridih with Dhanbad Junction via Tundi and Govindpur, and with Jhajha via Bengabad, Chakai and Sono.

=== Road ===
The NH 19 (old NH 2)/Grand Trunk Road passes through Giridih district but away from the city.

Giridih has a bus terminus in the centre of the town. The bus stand is divided into platforms for private buses. A government bus terminus is just adjacent to the main bus terminus. There are regular bus services from the city to other parts in the district. Bus service to Ranchi, Dhanbad, Bokaro, Hazaribagh, Deoghar, Jamshedpur, Durgapur, Kolkata, Howrah, Asansol, and Patna is available.

=== Air ===
Boro Aerodrome is an airstrip at the district headquarters of Giridih. Giridih is well connected to some of the popular airports of Bihar, Jharkhand and West Bengal and they are:

1. Deoghar Airport, Deoghar 71 kilometres (44 mi)
2. Kazi Nazrul Islam Airport, Durgapur 140 kilometres (87 mi)
3. Birsa Munda Airport, Ranchi 155 kilometres (96 mi)
4. Gaya Airport 169 kilometres (105 mi)
5. Lok Nayak Jayaprakash Airport, Patna 223 kilometres (139 mi)
6. Netaji Subhas Chandra Bose International Airport, Kolkata 309 kilometres (192 mi)

== Demographics ==
=== Population ===
Historical population
Year	Pop.	±%
1901	9,433	—
1911	10,668	+13.1%
1921	18,874	+76.9%
1931	21,122	+11.9%
1941	25,325	+19.9%
1951	29,167	+15.2%
1961	36,881	+26.4%
1971	40,308	+9.3%
1981	65,444	+62.4%
1991	78,097	+19.3%
2001	98,989	+26.8%
2011	114,533	+15.7%

As of 2011 India census, Giridih Urban Agglomeration had a population of 143,529, it is the seventh largest city of Jharkhand. Males constitute 53% of the population and females 47%. Giridih has an average literacy rate of 69%, higher than the national average of 59.5%; male literacy is 74%, and female literacy is 63%. In Giridih, 15% of the population is under 6 years of age. The language spoken is known as Khortha.

Giridih Urban Agglomeration is composed of Giridih (Nagar Parishad), Paratdih (CT), Sirsia (CT), Pertodih (CT) and Dandidih (CT).

=== Religion ===
Religion in Giridih City
Religion	Per cent
Hinduism	67.66%
Islam	30.31%
Christianity	0.84%
Sikhism	0.55%
Jainism	0.47%
Buddhism	0.04%
Others	0.07%

Hinduism is the prominent religion of Giridih city followed by 67.66% of the population. Islam is the dominant minority religion in the city followed by 30.31% of the people. Other minorities are Christians 0.84%, Sikhs 0.55%, Jains 0.47%, Buddhists 0.04%, and others 0.07%.

== Infrastructure ==
According to the District Census Handbook 2011, Giridih, Giridih covered an area of 9.75 km^{2}. Among the civic amenities, it had 41 km roads with both open and closed drains, the protected water supply involved tapwater from treated sources, uncovered well, overhead tank. It had 17,381 domestic electric connections, 1,410 road light points. Among the medical facilities, it had 4 hospitals (allopathic and others), 53 dispensaries, 53 health centres, 1 family welfare centre, 5 maternity and child welfare centres, 7 maternity homes, 1 TB hospital/ clinic, 16 nursing homes, 3 chairtable hospital/ nursing homes, 2 veterinary hospitals, 25 medicine shops. Among the educational facilities it had 28 primary schools, 15 middle schools, 7 secondary schools, 8 senior secondary schools, 3 general degree colleges. It had 2 recognised shorthand, type-writing and vocational training centre,1 non-formal education centre (Sarva Siksha Abhiyan), 1 special school for disabled. Among the social, cultural and recreational facilities, it had 1 working women's hostel, 1 stadium, 4 cinema theatres, 1 auditorium/ community hall, 1 public library and reading room. Three important commodities it produced were lac, coal, mica. It had the branch offices of 14 nationalised banks, 7 private commercial banks, 2 cooperative banks, 1 agricultural credit society, 1 non-agricultural credit society.

== Economy ==
It has a growing economy. This town used to bustle with economic activity in the period from the 1960s to 1980s when the mineral mica processing and export community reaped tremendous gains through exports to the USSR. However, since the decline of the USSR and its split into twelve CIS countries, the industry has slowly declined and is currently ailing.

On the southern side of Giridih, in Beniadih, are the coal mines of Central Coalfields Limited, a subsidiary of Coal India Limited (a Maharatna and the world's largest coal miner). It is the largest industry in the Giridih district and major contributor to the economy of the town. Central Coalfields Limited itself is a Miniratna.

The Data Processing Center of Data Processing Division (DPD) of National Sample Survey Office (NSSO) provides complete IT solution from sample selection, software development to processing and tabulation of data canvassed through various socio-economic surveys of National Sample Survey Organisation.

Mica business also contribute a lot in the trade data, mainly mica is exported to China, Europe, Japan, Taiwan, US the total value of mica exports is US$ 100 million, the leading mica exporters are Jalan Mica Exports, Ratan Mica Exports, Jai Mica, Mount Hill, Gahlot Mica Supply Company, Chandauri Mica Syndicate Etc.

In 2006 the Indian government named Giridh one of the country's 250 most backward districts (out of a total of 640). It is one of the 21 districts in Jharkhand currently receiving funds from the Backward Regions Grant Fund Programme (BRGF).

Presently, there are more than a dozen Sponge Iron and Rolling Mill Factories in Giridih. The name of few are Mongia Steel, SriBir, Siscon, Baba, Salasar, SriRam, Lal Steel, Saluja Gold, Gouri Shanker etc.

There is an Industrial Area adjacent to the city, which is full of small, medium and large Factories, these units provide employment to the locals and also to people from different parts of the country. These are namely Mongia Steel, Saluja Steel & Power, and Shivam Group of Companies.

However, pollution remains a critical issue in the surroundings of the Industrial Area which needs to be addressed by Municipal Corporation of Giridih, Chamber of Industries & Commerce and other authorities.

== Education ==
Notable colleges include:

Notable schools include:

- Carmel School, Giridih
- Delhi Public School, Giridih
- Jawahar Navodaya Vidyalaya, Gandey, Giridih

== Tourism ==
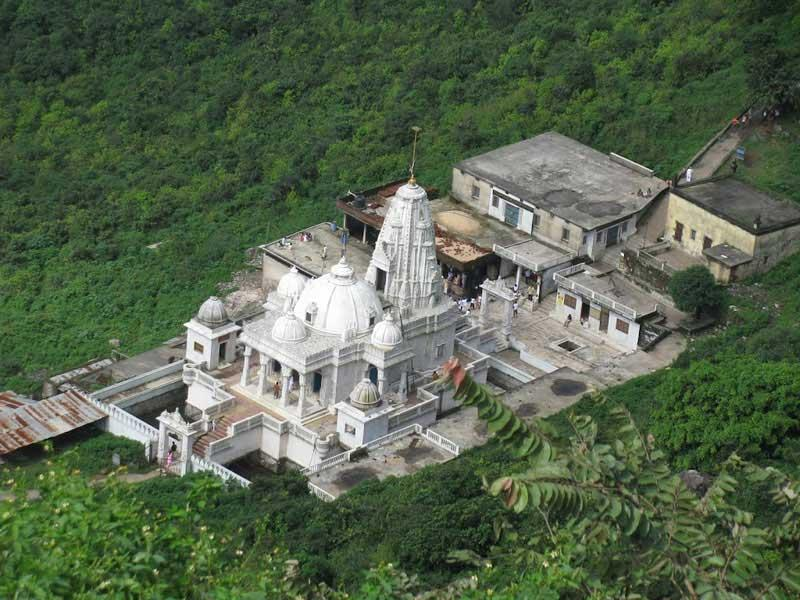
Jal Mandir, Shikharji

- Shri Sammed Shikharji, also known as the Parasnath Hills, with the highest mountain peak in Jharkhand, 4480 feet above sea level, is a major Jain pilgrimage destination and one of the most sacred places for Jains in the world. According to Jain belief, twenty of the twenty-four Tirthankaras (teachers of the Jains), (including Parshanath) attained Moksha (Nirvana) from this place.
- Rajdah Dham, Sabalpur, also known as Rajdaha, is a temple of Lord Shiva. It is situated approximately 60 km Giridih and 5 km from Suriya. (Near Nimatand Sabalpur). It is situated on the bank of the Barakar River.
- Langta Baba Samadhi Sthal This is located in Kharagdiha, about 30 km North West of the town on road towards Jamua. Langta Baba is revered both by the Hindus and the Muslims alike. People offer chadar to his samadhi as a ritual, and it is believed the wish made here by a true devotee always get fulfilled.
- Usri Falls 13 km from town, on the Tundi road, it is a picnic spot. The Usri river falls a 40 feet steep gorge in three separate streams. The place is surrounded by dense forest of Parasnath Hills.
- Khandoli Dam located 7 km North-East of Giridih headquarters towards Bengabad block, is a scenic water reservoir and a dam. The place has been developed as a tourism attraction. It has water-related adventure sports and bird-watching. A number of other amusement facilities are available there including boating, Rock-climbing, Parasailing and Kayaking.
- Sri Kabir Gyan Mandir in Sihodih, some 2 km from Giridih headquarters, Founded in 1985, a motivational institution is headed by Sadguru Maa Gyan which spreads the message of Sant Kabir and Sanatan Dharma. It has a sacred temple Guru Govind Dham with an idol of Sant Kabir and Lord Vishnu. It also has Kabir Gyan Darshan with worth to watch murals and paintings based on life of Sant Kabir, Vedas, Morality and paintings of saints of India.
- Surya Mandir is located in Mirzaganj, 33 km from Giridih Town. It is built in the middle of a lake in the shape of a Lotus flower. Pilgrims can visit here while returning from Langta Baba Samadhi. The temple has been declared Monument of National importance and is maintained by Archaeological Survey of India.

== Notable people ==
- Sir Jagadish Chandra Bose spent his last days in Giridih and the Sir J.C. Bose Girl's High School is named in his honour. He died in Giridih. His then residence is now known as "Vigyan Kendra" run by Bihar Council of Science and Technology.
- Jnan Chandra Ghosh, studied at Giridih High School, where he passed the Entrance Examination of Calcutta University. He played an important role in shaping science and engineering education in India. He was the first Director of Indian Institute of Technology Kharagpur, Director of Indian Institute of Science, Bangalore, and Vice-Chancellor of Calcutta University.
- Satyajit Ray, a legendary filmmaker and Oscar recipient, spent his childhood in Giridih. He sketched his fictional character (appearing in a series of science fiction books), scientist Professor Shonku as residing in Giridih beside the Usri river.
- Rabindranath Tagore, a literary figure and Nobel Laureate, also spent some time in Giridih. He wrote his Shivaji Utsav in 1904 while residing in Giridih. The house in which he resided, Dawasika Bhawan, still exists in Giridih.
- Prasanta Chandra Mahalanobis (1893–1972), Indian statistician and founder of the Indian Statistical Institute, established a ISI research unit in Giridih in 1931 and maintained close ties to the town through family connections and academic activities.
- Krishna Ballabh Sahay was the elected member of Bihar Legislative Assembly from Giridih Constituency for several terms, including the one in which he served as the chief minister of Undivided Bihar during 1963 – 67.
