= Parasnath =

Mountain in Giridih district, Jharkhand, India

- Sammet ShikharMarang Buru
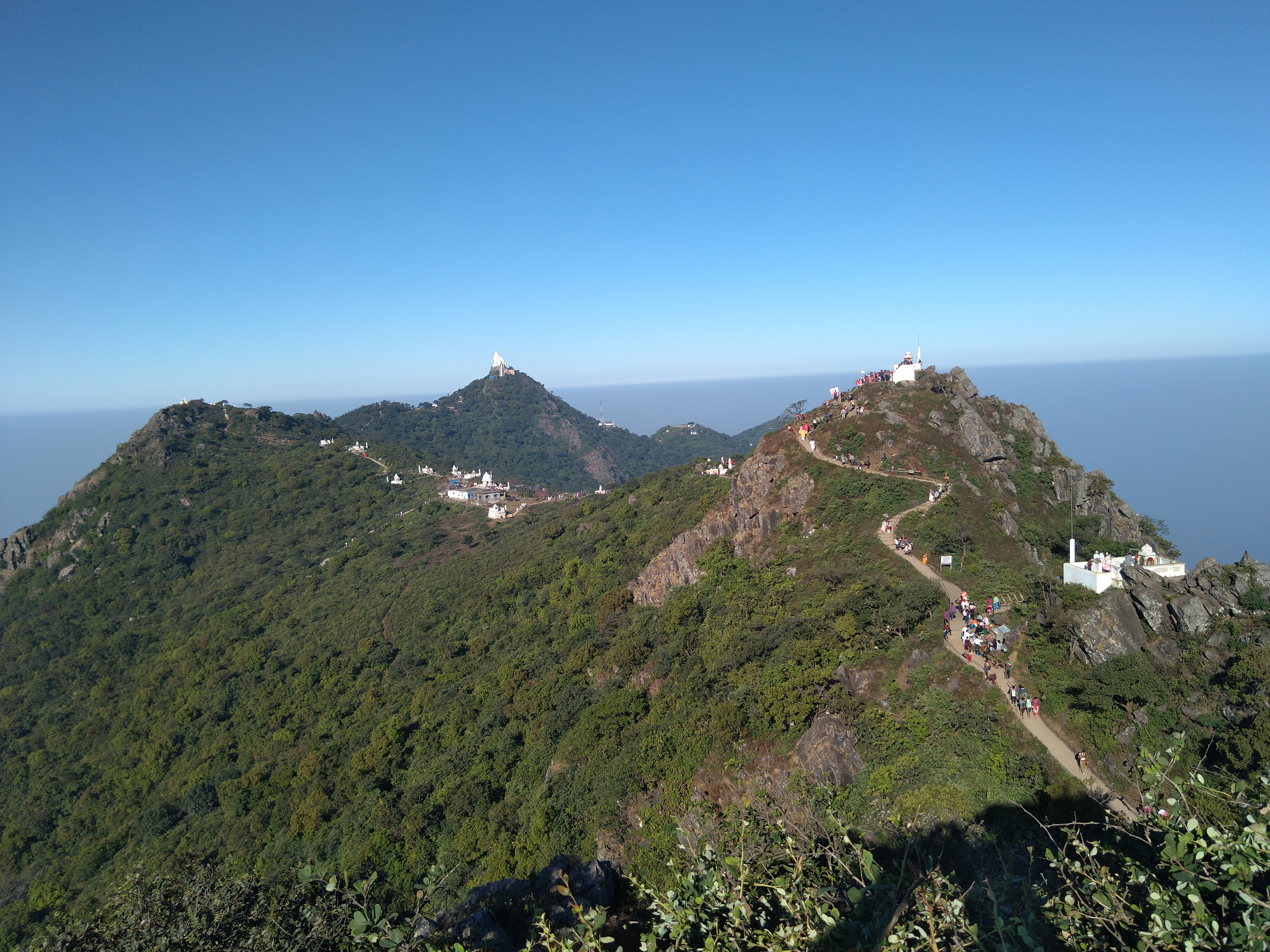
- Parasnath Hill

Highest point
- Elevation: 1,365 m (4,478 ft)
- Prominence: 1,017 m (3,337 ft)
- Listing: List of Indian states and territories by highest point
- Coordinates: 23°57′48″N 86°07′44″E

Geography
- Location within Jharkhand
- Location: Pirtand CD Block, Giridih, Jharkhand, India
- Parent range: Parasnath Range

Parasnath Hill (also Sammet Shikhar, Marang Buru) is a mountain peak in the Parasnath hill range. It is located towards the eastern end of the Chota Nagpur Plateau in the Giridih district (Hazaribagh district in British India) of the Indian state of Jharkhand. The hill is named after Parshvanatha, the 23rd Jain Tirthankara, who attained liberation here in 8th century BCE. In this connection, there is the holiest Jain pilgrimage, Shikharji on the top of hill. The hill is also known as Sammet Shikhar (lit. 'great mountain', the supreme deity) by other autochthonous of the region in religious contexts.

== Geography ==
Parasnath Hill and other locations in the Giridih district in North Chotanagpur Division. Key:
M: municipality, C: census town, R: rural/ urban centre, H: historical/ religious/ tourist centre
Click or prolonged tap on icons for detail. Owing to space constraints, the locations on click through to the larger map may vary slightly.

At 1,365 m (4,478 ft) Parasnath is the highest mountain peak in the state of Jharkhand, and is theoretically inter-visible (by direct line of sight on a perfectly clear day) with Mount Everest over 450 km (280 mi) away. The foothills of the Himalayas are about 180 miles away to the north over the Ganges.

There is a Jain temple on the mountain peak known as "Svarna Bhadra koot " ("cottage of golden grace"). The temple is made of marble. There is another marble Jain temple on hill, known as Jal Mandir.

It is easily accessible from Parasnath railway station.

== Geology ==
The underlying rock is metamorphosed fine-grained sedimentary rock with granodiorite igneous intrusions through these older formations.

== Fauna ==
As originally described several landsnails were only found in the Parasnath Hills area but the fauna is otherwise typical for Bengal.

== History ==
Historically, Parasnath or Sammet Shikharji has been an ancient Jain pilgrimage site. It is a place where the 23rd tirthankara Parshvanath (also known as Parasnath) attained liberation here in 772 BCE. It is noteworthy that the name of the Parasnath hill derived from the Jain Tirthankar Parshvanath who is also known as Parasnath or Parsva who attained liberation here during the 8th century BCE. After preaching for 70 years, Parshvanath attained moksha at Shikharji on Parasnath hill. Some Jain texts name the place as Mount Sammeta. It is the most revered in Jainism because 20 of its 24 tirthankars are believed to have attained moksha there. at the age of 100 on Shravana Shukla Saptami according to Lunar Calendar. His moksha (liberation from the cycle of birth and death) in Jain tradition is celebrated as Moksha Saptami. This day is celebrated on large scale at Parasnath tonk of the mountain, in northern Jharkhand, part of the Parasnath Range by offering Nirvana Laddu (Sugar balls) and reciting of Nirvana Kanda. Parshvanatha has been called purisādāṇīya (beloved of the people) by Jains.

The earliest literary reference to Shikharji (Parasnath) as a tirth (place of Jain pilgrimage) is found in the Jñātṛdhārmakātha, one of the twelve core texts of Jainism compiled in 6th century BCE by chief disciple of Mahavira. Shikharji is also mentioned in the Pārśvanāthacarita, a twelfth-century biography of Pārśva. A 13th century CE palm-leaf manuscript of Kalpa Sūtra and Kalakacaryakatha has an image of a scene of Parshavanatha's nirvana at Shikharji. This all indicates Parasnath was a Jain site since ancient times. Also many historians accept Parasnath as the place of Nirvan Kalyanak of the historical figure and the 23rd Tirthankar, Parshvanath.

== Jain heritage ==
Parasnath Hill, located in the state of Jharkhand, India, is the highest mountain in the state and is considered a sacred site by followers of Jainism. The hill is named after Parshvanatha, the 23rd Tirthankara in Jain tradition. It is home to several Jain temples and attracts pilgrims from across the country. The recent legal developments concerning the preservation of its sanctity highlight the ongoing tensions between religious practices and environmental concerns. The Jharkhand High Court has sought responses from both the central and state governments regarding a plea aimed at protecting the hill's sanctity, indicating the importance of this site in the context of religious and cultural heritage in India.

This is one of the most holy and revered sites for the Jain community. They call it Sammed Sikhar. It is a major pilgrimage site. Out of 24 Tirthankaras of Jains, twenty attained nirvana at Parshvnatha Hills.

On the mountain, there are the Shikharji Jain temples, an important tirthakshetra or Jain pilgrimage site. For each Tirthankara there is a shrine (gumti or Tonk) on the hill.

The Jain temple is believed to be constructed either by the Magadha King Bimbisara or by the Kalinga King Avakinnayo Karakandu.

An ancient idol of Parasnath is located in the valley at Palganj. The idol is believed to be 2500 years old.

During 772 BCE at the age of 100 on Shravana Shukla Saptami according to Lunar Calendar. Tirthankar Parswanath moksha (liberation from the cycle of birth and death) in Jaina tradition is celebrated as Moksha Saptami. This day is celebrated on large scale at Parasnath tonk of the mountain, in northern Jharkhand, part of the Parasnath Range by offering Nirvana Laddu (Sugar balls) and reciting of Nirvana Kanda.

== Santhal heritage ==
The local Santhal community, which comprises 26% of the population of Jharkhand, use the name Marang Buru to refer to both their deity and the mountain. They are in dispute with the Jain community as to certain ancestral worship and other rights, and these have been subject to judicial review historically. Recent bans on meat and alcohol, upheld by the Jharkhand High Court in 2025, have exacerbated the conflict, curtailing Santal traditions and fueling protests and counter-petitions in the court. However Jains claim that Santhal claim is implausible and illogical and that actually Parasnath is a Jain pilgrimage since ancient times. They also observe that Jains and Adivasis have co-existed at Parasnath Hill since ancient times, and that when the tirthankaras sought nirvana there, Adivasis traditionally carried them to the summit, a practice that continues today.

== See also ==
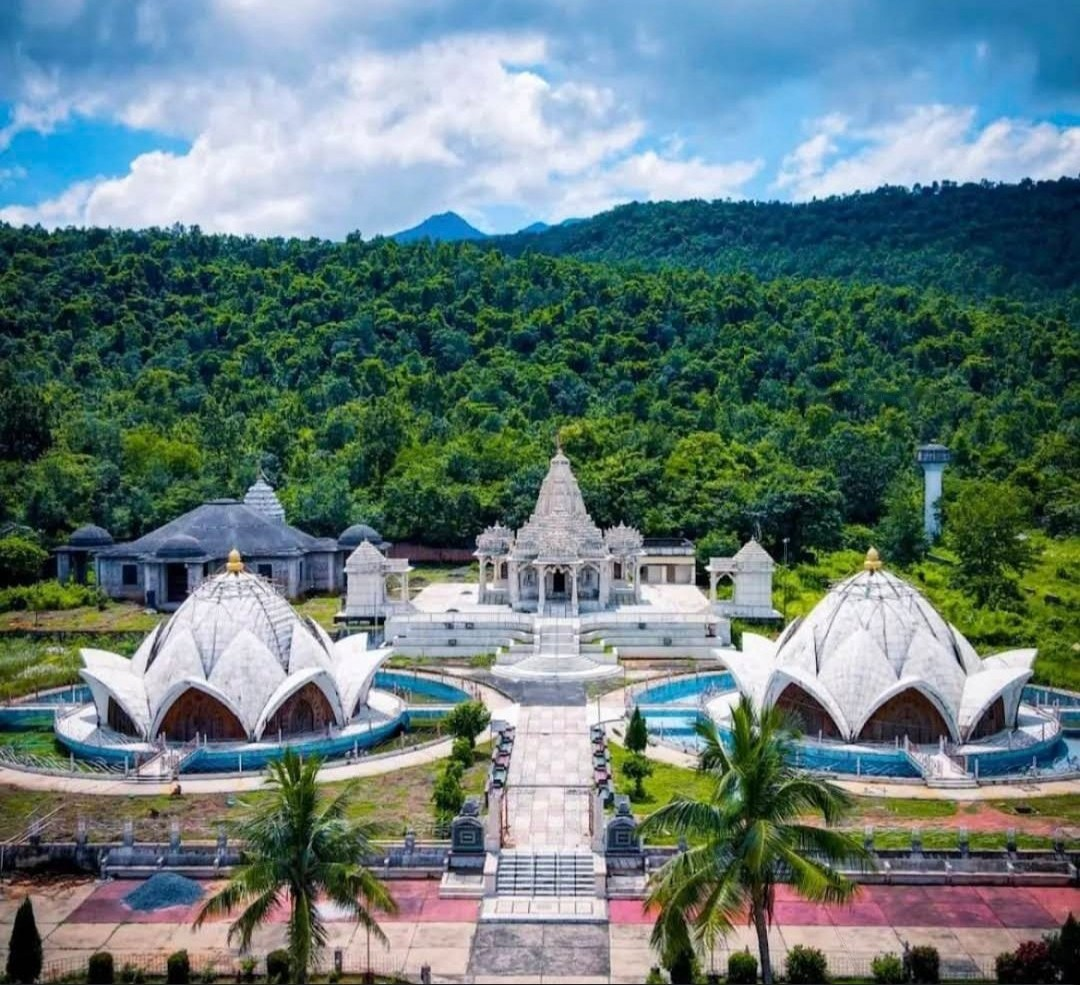
Shwetambar temple of Parshwanath at foothills of Parasnath hill

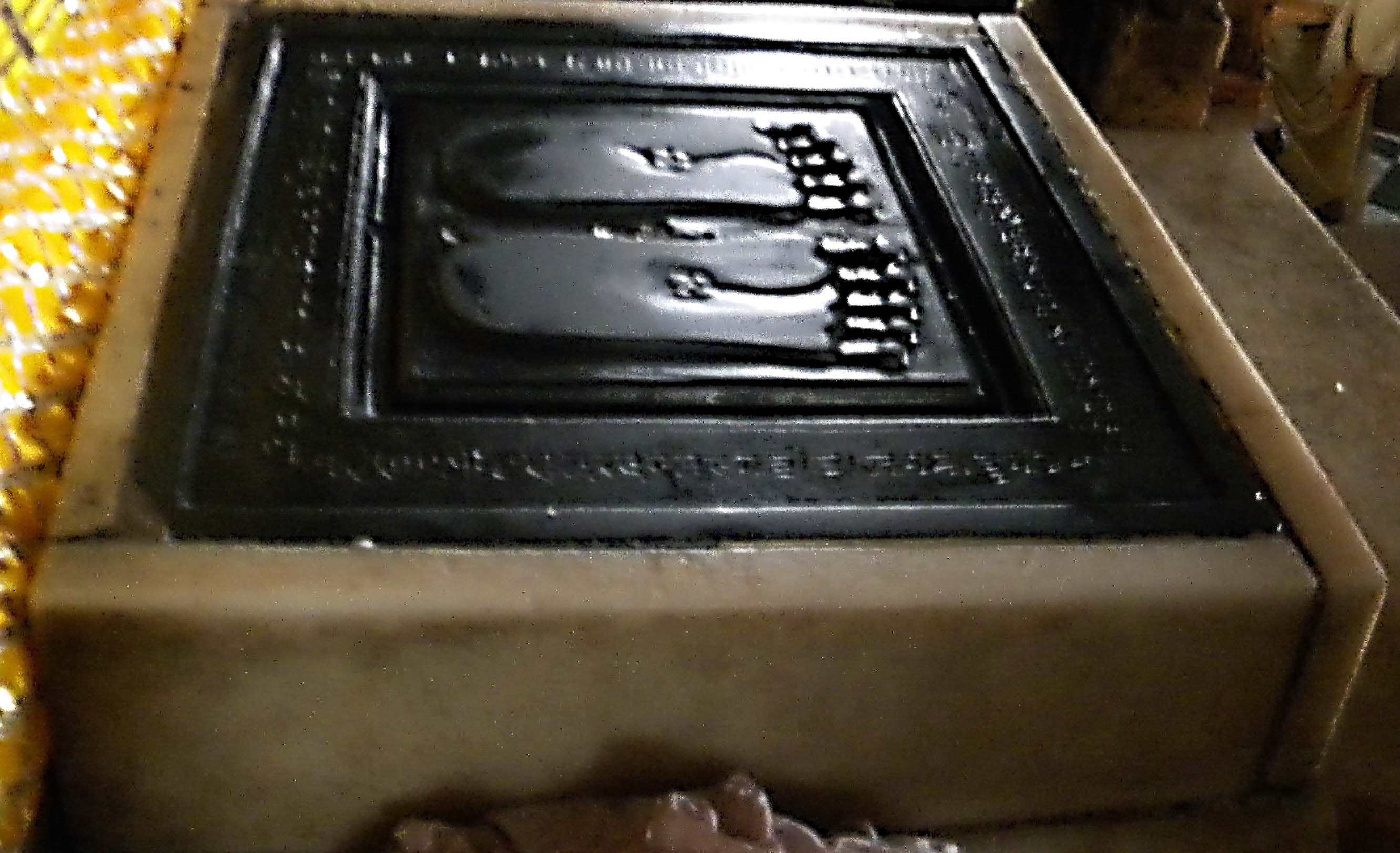
Foot idol of Parasnath

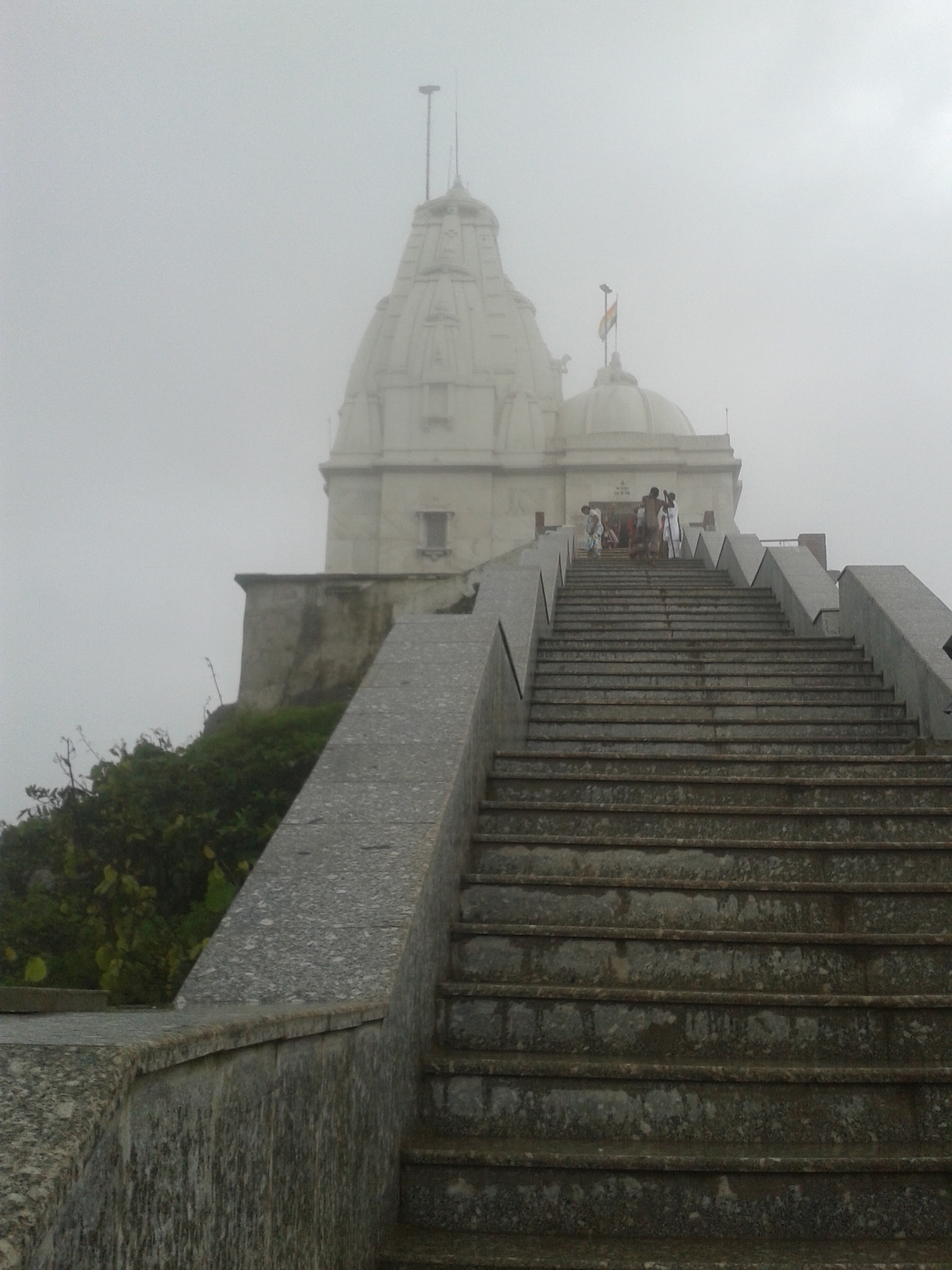
"Swarna Bhadra Koot" Temple of Parasnath on mountain peak

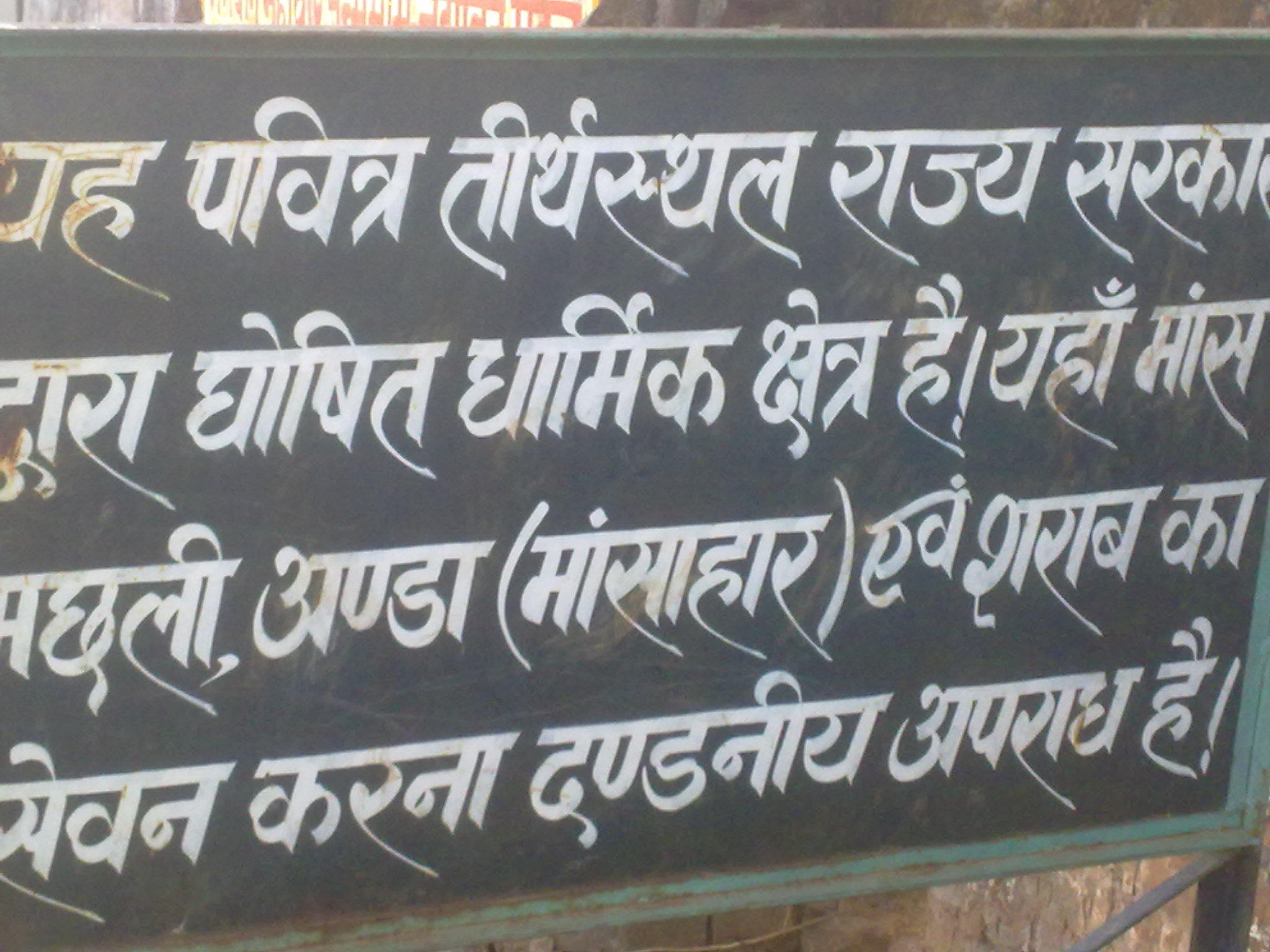
Notice board on mountain

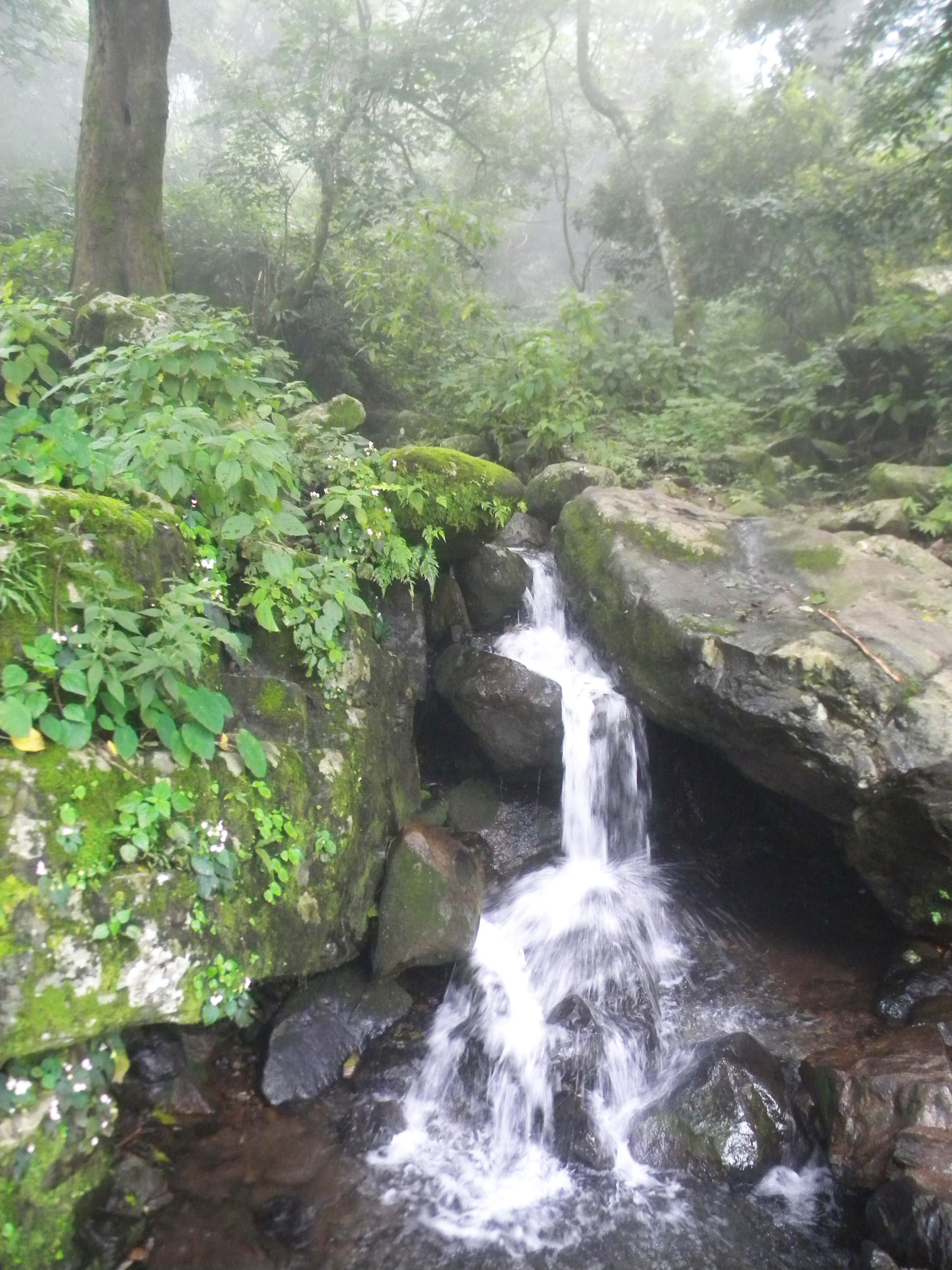
Waterfall on hill

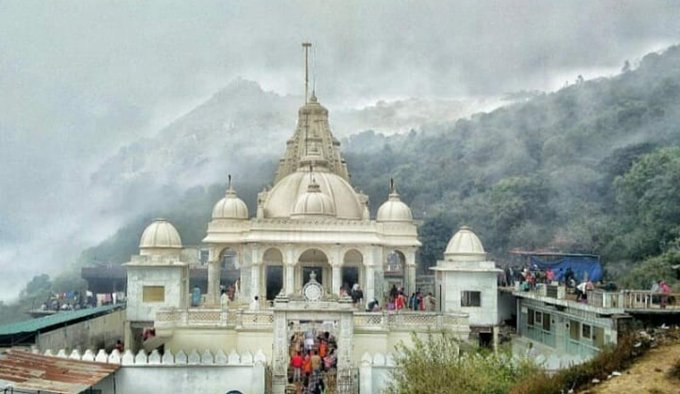
"Jal Mandir", a Jain temple over hill

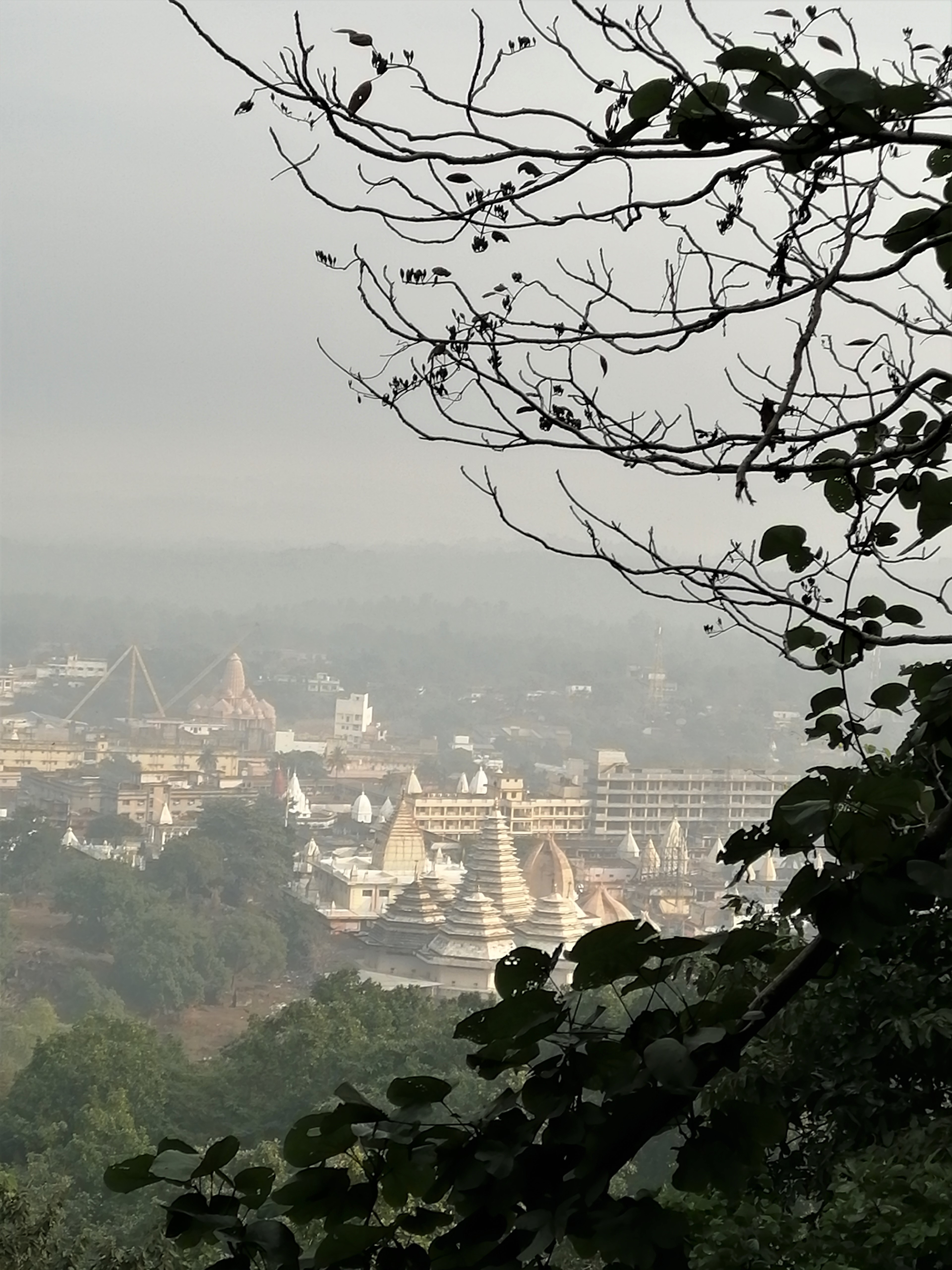
Temples in valley

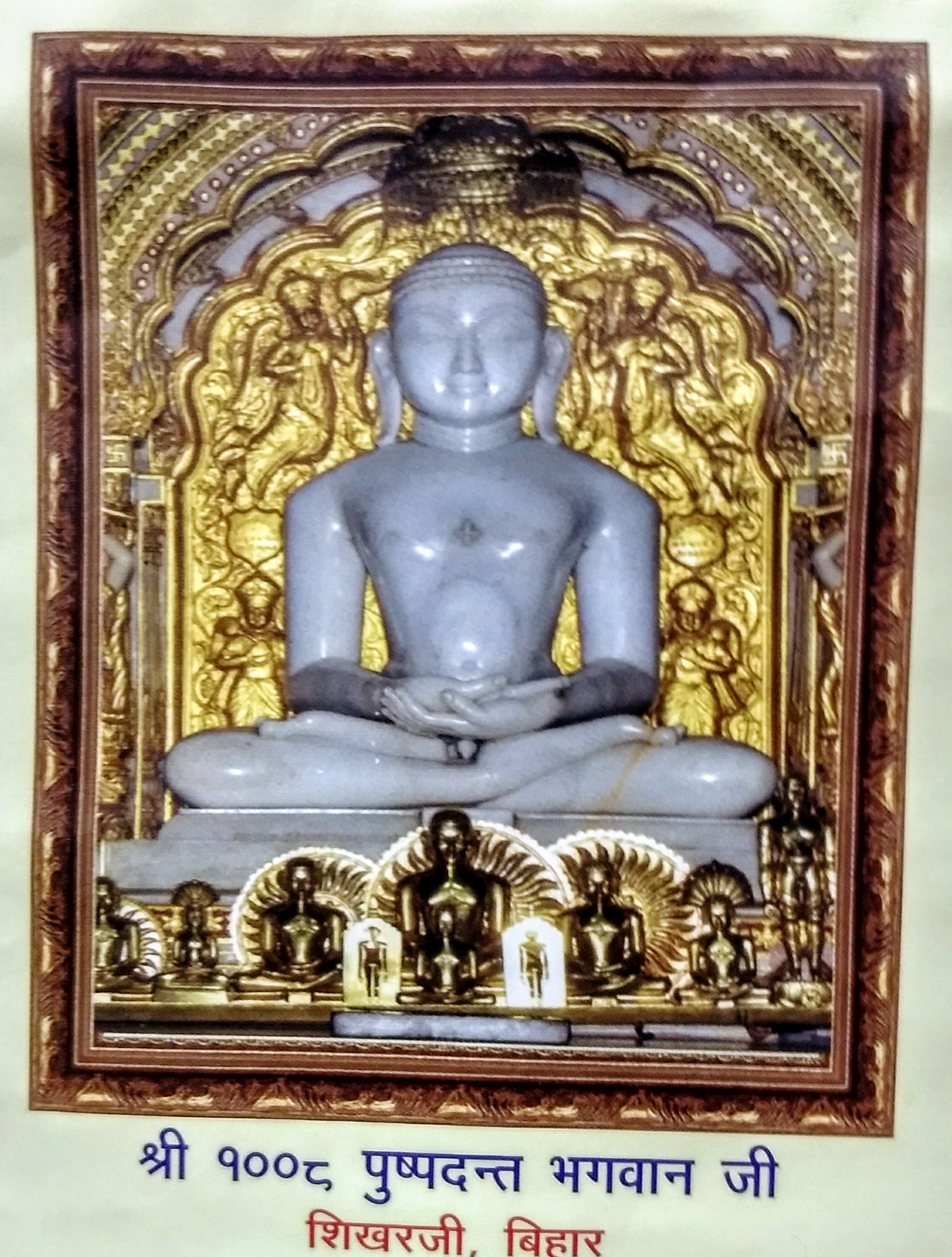
Idol of Pushpadant
- List of mountains in India
- List of mountains by elevation
- Shikharji movement
