= Mahesiadighi =

- Village
- Location in Jharkhand, India
- Coordinates: 24.444215°N 86.2568551°E
- Country: India
- State: Jharkhand
- District: Giridih
- Block: Deori

Languages
  - Official: Hindi, Urdu
- Time zone: UTC+5:30 (IST)

Mahesiadigi is a village in the Deori CD Block in Khori Mahuwa subdivision of Giridih district, in the Indian state of Jharkhand.

Kayastha people are the leaders of this village. Shiv Dham which is 150 years old is the most popular and known temple of the village and the nearby areas. Durga Puja is the main festival celebrated in this village by the Kayastha community and the others. Every year, the local people, along with Kayastha families who have moved to other states and towns for their livelihood, get together and celebrate Dussehra in great harmony. Along with this, Maha Shivaratri is also celebrated in a grand way. Krishna Janmashtami, Ramnavmi and many other festivals maintain the same importance. It is a secular belief of the villagers that the entire village is protected by a holy spirit called Diwan Baba, who is the protector of this village. People of this village (both the upper and the lower castes) perform a one-day ceremony dedicated to Diwan Baba. Involvement of females is prohibited in the worshipping spot of Diwan Baba.
