= Barki Saraiya =

- Census Town
- Location in Jharkhand, India Barki Saraiya (India)
- Coordinates: 24.171361°N 85.898728°E
- Country: India
- State: Jharkhand
- District: Giridih

Area
  - Total: 18.68 km^{2} (7.21 sq mi)

Population (2024)
  - Total: 26,700
  - Density: 1,430/km^{2} (3,700/sq mi)

Languages (*For language details see Sariya (community development block)#Language and religion)
  - Official: Hindi, Urdu
- Time zone: UTC+5:30 (IST)
- PIN: 825320
- Telephone/ STD code: 06557
- Lok Sabha constituency: Kodarma
- Vidhan Sabha constituency: Bagodar
- Website: giridih.nic.in

Barki Saraiya is a census town in the Sariya CD block in the Bagodar-Saria subdivision of the Giridih district in the Indian state of Jharkhand.

== Geography ==
Cities, towns and locations in the Giridih district in North Chotanagpur Division
M: municipality, CT: census town, R: rural/ urban centre, H: historical/ religious/ tourist centre
Owing to space constraints in the small map, the actual locations in a larger map may vary slightly

=== Location ===
Barki Saraiya is located at 24.171361°N 85.898728°E.

=== Area overview ===
Giridih district is a part of the Chota Nagpur Plateau, with rocky soil and extensive forests. Most of the rivers in the district flow from the west to east, except in the northern portion where the rivers flow north and north west. The Pareshnath Hill rises to a height of 4,479 feet (1,365 m). The district has coal and mica mines. It is an overwhelmingly rural district with small pockets of urbanisation.

Note: The map alongside presents some of the notable locations in the district. All places marked in the map are linked in the larger full screen map.

== Demographics ==
According to the 2011 Census of India, Barki Saraiya had a total population of 18,933, of which 9,954 (53%) were males and 8,979 (47%) were females. Population in the age range 0–6 years was 2,988. The total number of literate persons in Barki Saraiya was 1,236 (77.52% of the population over 6 years).

== Infrastructure ==
According to the District Census Handbook 2011, Giridih, Barki Saraiya covered an area of 18.68 km^{2}. Among the civic amenities, it had 56 km roads with both open and covered drains, the protected water supply involved uncovered well, hand pump. It had 1,611 domestic electric connections, 45 road light points. Among the educational facilities it had 12 primary schools, 8 middle schools, 2 secondary schools, the nearest senior secondary school at Bagodar 13 km away. It had 1 non-formal education centre (Sarva Siksha Abhiyan). Among the social, recreational and cultural facilities it had 1 cinema theatre, 1 auditorium/ community hall. Three important commodities it produced were soaps, sweets, curd. It had the branch offices of 2 nationalised banks, 1 private commercial bank, 1 cooperative bank and 1 agricultural credit society.

== Transport ==
Hazaribagh Road railway station is on the Asansol-Gaya section, a part of the Grand Chord, Howrah-Gaya-Delhi line and Howrah-Allahabad-Mumbai line.
