= Manju Kumari =

Indian politician (born 1979)

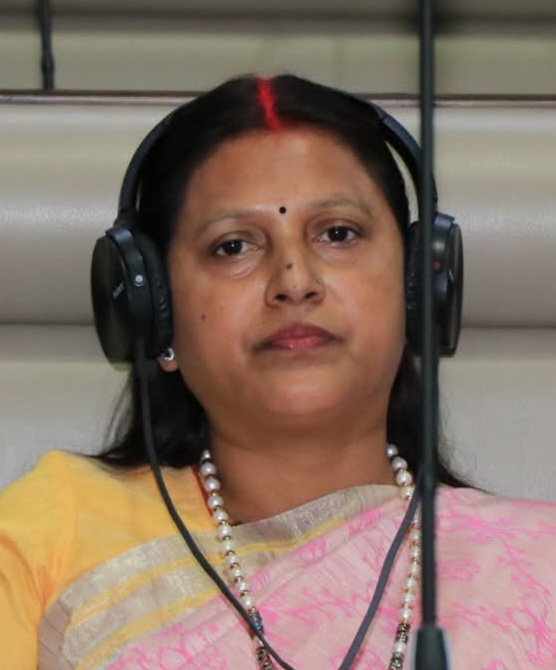

Member of the Jharkhand Legislative Assembly
- Incumbent
- Assumed office 23 November 2024
- Constituency: Jamua

Personal details
- Born: 1979 Jamua, Giridih district, Jharkhand, India
- Party: Bharatiya Janata Party (2024–present); Indian National Congress (until 2024)
- Parent: Sukar Ravidas (father)
- Education: Class 10
- Alma mater: S.B.M.K. High School, Bhandaro
- Occupation: Politician

Manju Kumari (born 1979) is an Indian politician from Jharkhand. She is an MLA from Jamua Assembly constituency, which is reserved for Scheduled Caste community, in Giridih District. She won the 2024 Jharkhand Legislative Assembly election, representing the Bharatiya Janata Party.

== Early life and education ==
Kumari is from Jamua, Giridih District, Jharkhand. She is the daughter of former MLA Sukar Ravidas. She studied Class 10 at S.B.M.K. High School, Bhandaro, Giridih, and she passed the examinations conducted by Bihar School Examination Council, Patna in 1994. Her husband is in Indian Navy.

== Career ==
Kumari won from Jamua Assembly constituency representing Bharatiya Janata Party in the 2024 Jharkhand Legislative Assembly election. She polled 1,17,532 votes and defeated her nearest rival and sitting MLA, Kedar Hazra of JMM, by a margin of 32,631 votes. Earlier, she represented Indian National Congress and lost the 2019 Jharkhand Legislative Assembly election to Kedar Hazra, who then contested on a BJP ticket. She joined the BJP in October 2024, a month before the Assembly election.
