= Hesla =

- Village
- Location in Jharkhand, India Hesla (India)
- Coordinates: 24.07°N 85.88°E
- Country: India
- State: Jharkhand
- District: Giridih
- Elevation: 365 m (1,198 ft)

Population (2011)
  - Total: 5,965

Languages
  - Official: Hindi, Urdu
- Time zone: UTC+5:30 (IST)
- Vehicle registration: JH

Hesla is a village in Bagodar CD Block in Bagodar-Saria subdivision of Giridih district in the Indian state of Jharkhand.

== Geography ==
Cities, towns and locations in the Giridih district in North Chotanagpur Division
M: municipality, CT: census town, R: rural/ urban centre, H: historical/ religious/ tourist centre
Owing to space constraints in the small map, the actual locations in a larger map may vary slightly

=== Location ===
Hesla is located at 24.07°N 85.88°E. It has an average elevation of 365 metres (1197 feet).

=== Area overview ===
Giridih district is a part of the Chota Nagpur Plateau, with rocky soil and extensive forests. Most of the rivers in the district flow from the west to east, except in the northern portion where the rivers flow north and north west. The Pareshnath Hill rises to a height of 4,479 feet (1,365 m). The district has coal and mica mines. It is an overwhelmingly rural district with small pockets of urbanisation.

Note: The map alongside presents some of the notable locations in the district. All places marked in the map are linked in the larger full screen map.

== Demographics ==
As per 2011 Census of India Hesla had a population of 5,965. There were 3,062 males and 2,903 females. Scheduled Castes numbered 444 and Scheduled Tribes numbered 2.

As of 2001 India census, Hesla had a population of 5,860. Males constitute 53% of the population and females 47%. Hesla has an average literacy rate of 78%, higher than the national average of 59.5%: male literacy is 83%, and female literacy is 73%. In Hesla, 12% of the population is under 6 years of age.

== Literacy ==
As of 2011 census, the total number of literates in Hesla was 3,296 out of which 1,972 were males and 1,324 were females.

== Economy ==
98% of the populations of Hesla and near villages are dependent on farming and that is their only source of income.

== School ==
Hesla High School is located at one of the Gram panchayats (Hesla) in Bagodar block of Giridih district of Jharkhand state of India. This school was started at the time (1984) when education in rural areas was not accessible to all who wished to study. It started under a mango tree but now has a roof. There are around 500 students currently studying, where there are 9 teachers the school.
