= Deori, Giridih =

Deori
- Village
- Location in Jharkhand, India Deori (India)
- Coordinates: 24.5143°N 86.1945°E
- Country: India
- State: Jharkhand
- District: Giridih

Population (2011)
  - Total: 1,285

Languages (*For language details see Deori block#Language and religion)
  - Official: Hindi, Urdu
- Time zone: UTC+5:30 (IST)
- PIN: 815314 (Deori)
- Telephone/ STD code: 06556
- Vehicle registration: JH 11
- Lok Sabha constituency: Kodarma
- Vidhan Sabha constituency: Jamua
- Website: giridih.nic.in

Deori is a village in the Deori CD block in the Khori Mahuwa subdivision of the Giridih district in the Indian state of Jharkhand.

== Geography ==
Cities, towns and locations in the Giridih district in North Chotanagpur Division
M: municipality, CT: census town, R: rural/ urban centre, H: historical/ religious/ tourist centre
Owing to space constraints in the small map, the actual locations in a larger map may vary slightly

=== Location ===
Deori is located at 24.5143°N 86.1945°E.

=== Area overview ===
Giridih district is a part of the Chota Nagpur Plateau, with rocky soil and extensive forests. Most of the rivers in the district flow from the west to east, except in the northern portion where the rivers flow north and north west. The Pareshnath Hill rises to a height of 4,479 feet (1,365 m). The district has coal and mica mines. It is an overwhelmingly rural district with small pockets of urbanisation.

Note: The map alongside presents some of the notable locations in the district. All places marked in the map are linked in the larger full screen map.

== Demographics ==
According to the 2011 Census of India, Deori had a total population of 1,285, of which 642 (50%) were males and 643 (50%) were females. Population in the age range 0-6 years was 222. The total number of literate persons in Deori was 716 (67.36% of the population over 6 years).

== Civic administration ==
=== Police station ===
Deori police station has jurisdiction over Deori CD block. According to old British records, Deori PS was there after Giridh subdivision was formed in 1870.

=== CD block HQ ===
The headquarters of Deori CD block are located at Deori.

== Transport ==
Deori is on a road, a short stretch of which leads to Jamua-Deoghar Road.
