= Harihar Dham =

- हरिहर धाम मंदिर
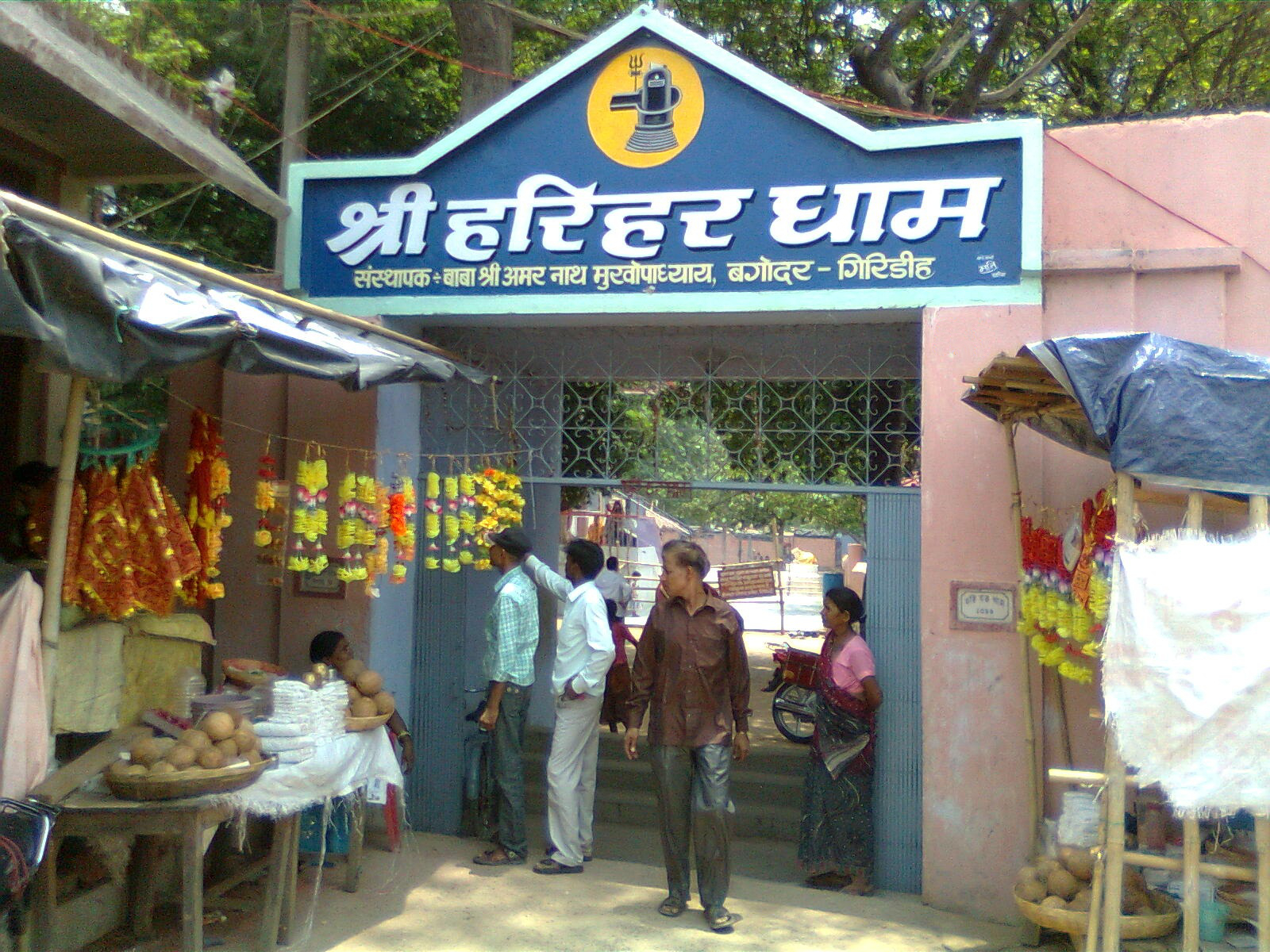
- Harihar Dham

- Location in Jharkhand

Religion
- Affiliation: Hinduism
- District: Giridih
- Deity: Shiva
- Festival: Maha Shivaratri

Location
- Location: Bagodar
- State: Jharkhand
- Country: India
- Coordinates: 24°4′12″N 85°49′16″E

Website
- giridih.nic.in/tourism.html

Harihar Dham temple, commonly known as Harihar Dham located in Bagodar, Giridih, of Indian state of Jharkhand has the distinction of having Shivalinga.

== Location ==
Harihar Dham is located at 1 km from Grand Trunk Road at Bagodar 60 km South west of the Giridih district headquarters in the North Chotanagpur division of the state of Jharkhand, India.

Giridih was earlier a part of Hazaribagh district, of former undivided Bihar state. Giridih was later made a separate district and a part of the state of Jharkhand.

== Description ==
The Shivalinga is the tallest in the world with a height of 65 ft (20 m). The Temple is spread over an area of 25 acres (10 ha) and is surrounded by river. It took around 30 years to complete the construction of the huge Shivling. The temple is a major tourist spot and is visited by devotees from all over India every year on Shravan Poornima to worship Lord Shiva. Shravan Poornima is the full moon night in the holy month of Shraavana. It is the month of festivals and pious rituals. On the fifth day of the bright half of the holy month of Shraavana the ritual of worshiping a cobra popularly known as Nag Panchami is celebrated. Owing to its religious importance Harihar Dham is also a popular place for marriage for people of the Hindu religion.

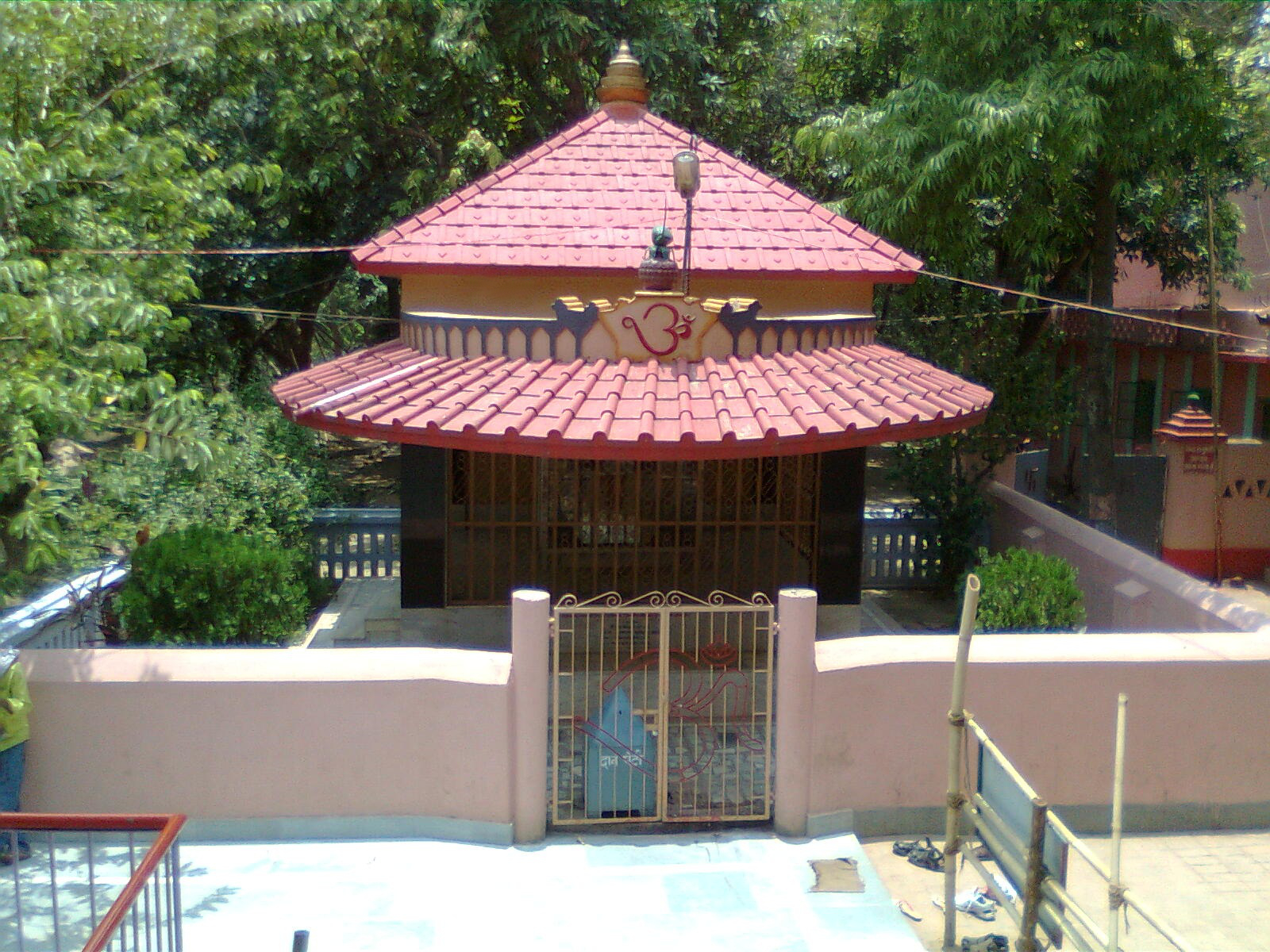
Aashram

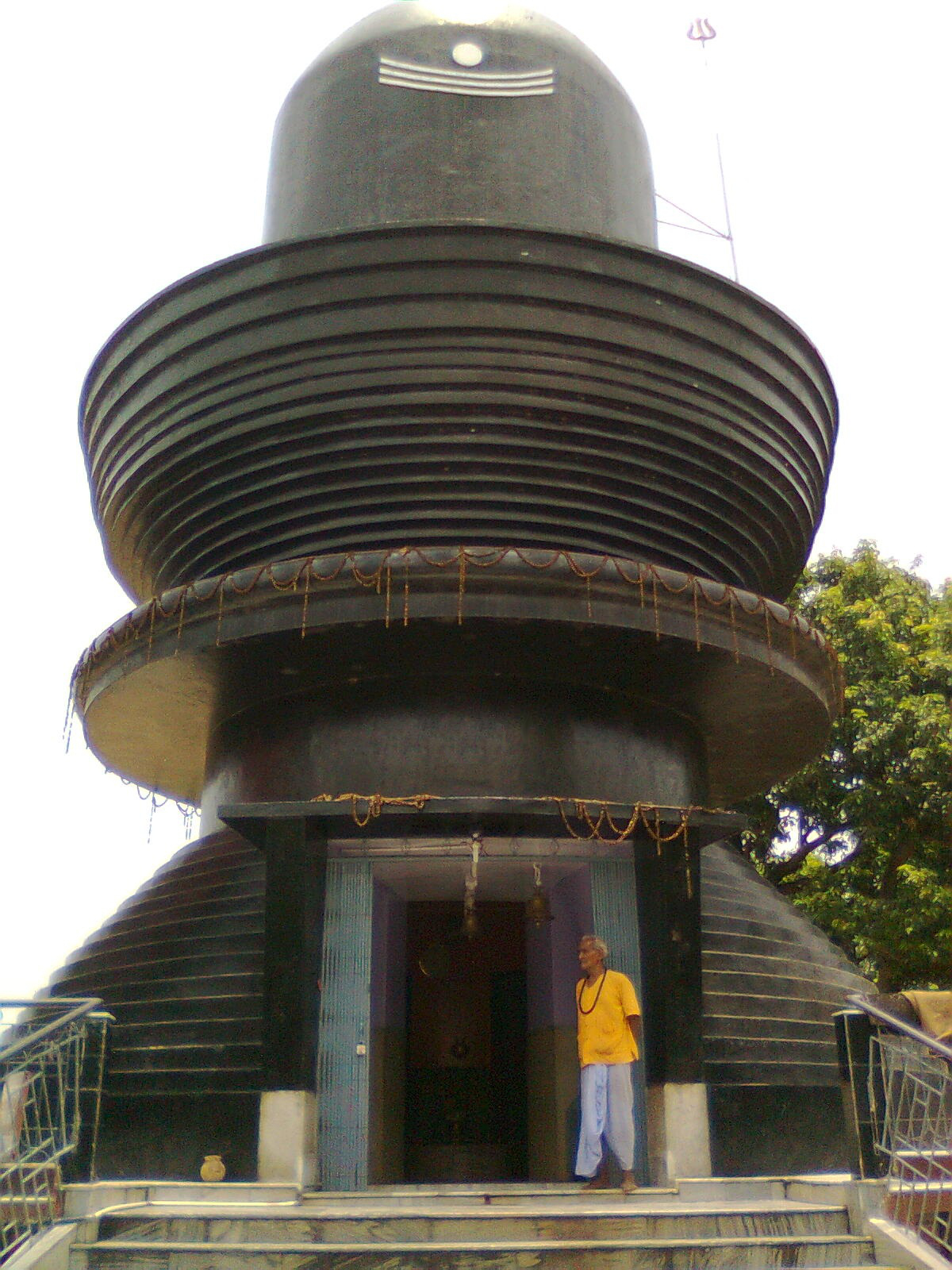
Shiv Temple

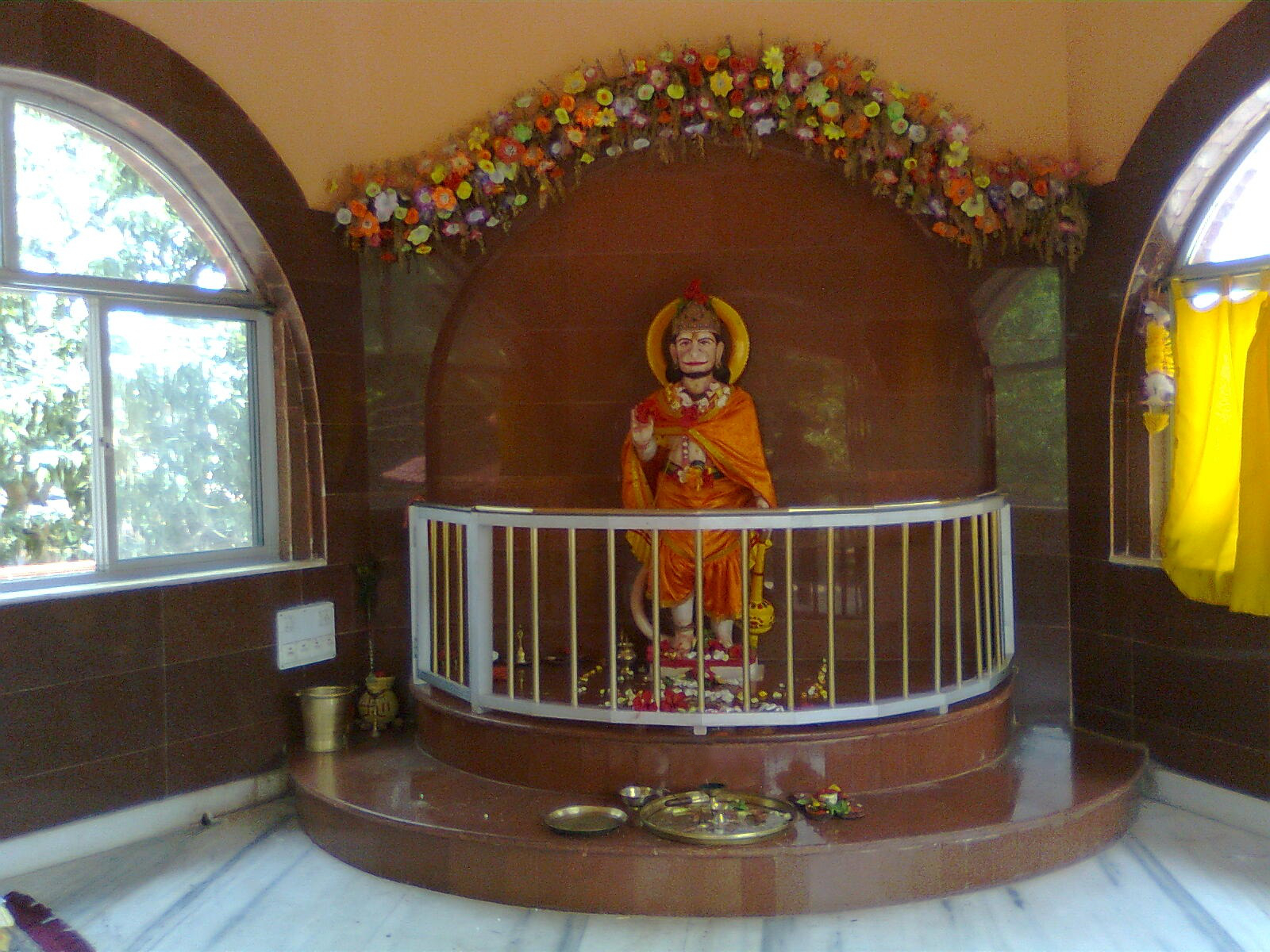
Hanuman Temple

External media

Images
- Picture of Harihar Dham Shivalinga, from here retrieved 8.03.2012
- Picture of Harihar Dham, from here retrieved 8.03.2012

Video
- Video of Harihar Dham by Dept. of Tourism, Govt of Jharkhand
- Video2 of Harihar Dham
