= Bhelwaghati =

- Village
- Location in Jharkhand, India Bhelwaghati (India)
- Coordinates: 24.5943°N 86.2245°E
- Country: India
- State: Jharkhand
- District: Giridih

Population (2011)
  - Total: 2,032

Languages (*For language details see Deori block#Language and religion)
  - Official: Hindi, Urdu
- Time zone: UTC+5:30 (IST)
- PIN: 815314
- Telephone/ STD code: 06556
- Vehicle registration: JH 11
- Lok Sabha constituency: Kodarma
- Vidhan Sabha constituency: Jamua
- Website: giridih.nic.in

Bhelwaghati is a village in the Deori CD block in the Khori Mahuwa subdivision of the Giridih district in the Indian state of Jharkhand.

== Geography ==
Cities, towns and locations in the Giridih district in North Chotanagpur Division
M: municipality, CT: census town, R: rural/ urban centre, H: historical/ religious/ tourist centre
Owing to space constraints in the small map, the actual locations in a larger map may vary slightly

=== Location ===
Bhelwaghati is located at 24.5943°N 86.2245°E.

=== Area overview ===
Giridih district is a part of the Chota Nagpur Plateau, with rocky soil and extensive forests. Most of the rivers in the district flow from the west to east, except in the northern portion where the rivers flow north and north west. The Pareshnath Hill rises to a height of 4,479 feet (1,365 m). The district has coal and mica mines. It is an overwhelmingly rural district with small pockets of urbanisation.

Note: The map alongside presents some of the notable locations in the district. All places marked in the map are linked in the larger full screen map.

== Demographics ==
According to the 2011 Census of India, Bhelwaghati had total population of 2,032, of which 1,064 (52%) were males and 968 (48%) were females. Population in the age range 0–6 years was 423. The total number of literate persons in Bhelwaghati was 777 (48.29% of the population over 6 years).

== Civic administration ==
=== Police station ===
Bhelwaghati police station serves the Deori CD block.
