= Bagodar (community development block) =

Bagodar Bagodar
- Community Development Block
- Interactive map of Bagodar
- Coordinates: 24°5′0″N 85°52′0″E
- Country: India
- State: Jharkhand
- District: Giridih
- Subdivision: Bagodar-Saria
- Headquarters: Bagodar
- Panchayat: 22 (10th)

Government
  - Type: Federal democracy
  - Block Development Officer: Nisha Kumari
  - Circle Officer: Murari Nayak

Area
  - Total: 350.71 km^{2} (135.41 sq mi)
  - Rank: 10th
- Elevation: 356 m (1,168 ft)

Population (2011)
  - Total: 158,094
  - Rank: 8th
  - Density: 450.78/km^{2} (1,167.5/sq mi)
  - Rank: 8th

Languages
  - Official: Hindi, Urdu
- Time zone: UTC+5:30 (IST)
- PIN: 825322 (Bagodar)
- Telephone/STD code: 06557
- Vehicle registration: JH-11
- Literacy: 64.43%
- Sex Ratio: 958
- Nearest city: Hazaribag, Giridih, Dhanbad
- Lok Sabha constituency: Kodarma
- Vidhan Sabha constituency: Bagodar
- Website: giridih.nic.in

Bagodar (Hindi: Bagodar, pronounced [bəgo:dəɾ]) is a community development block (CD block) that forms an administrative division in the Bagodar-Saria subdivision of the Giridih district in the Indian state of Jharkhand.

== Overview ==
Giridih is a plateau region. The western portion of the district is part of a larger central plateau. The rest of the district is a lower plateau, a flat table land with an elevation of about 1,300 feet. At the edges, the ghats drop to about 700 feet. The Pareshnath Hills or Shikharji rises to a height of 4,480 feet in the south-eastern part of the district. The district is thickly forested. Amongst the natural resources, it has coal and mica. Inaugurating the Pradhan Mantri Ujjwala Yojana in 2016, Raghubar Das, Chief Minister of Jharkhand, had indicated that there were 23 lakh BPL families in Jharkhand. There was a plan to bring the BPL proportion in the total population down to 35%.

== Maoist activities ==
Jharkhand is one of the states affected by Maoist activities. As of 2012, Giridih was one of the 14 highly affected districts in the state.As of 2016, Giridih was identified as one of the 13 focus areas by the state police to check Maoist activities. In 2017, the Moists, in Giridih district, have torched more than 50 vehicles engaged in road construction or carrying goods.

== Geography ==
Bagodar is located at 24°5′0″N 85°52′0″E at an elevation of 356 m from mean sea level (MSL).

Bagodar CD block is bounded by Sariya CD block on the north, Dumri CD block on the east, Bishnugarh CD block, in Hazaribagh district, on the south and Barkatha CD block, in Hazaribagh district, on the west.

Bagodar CD block has an area of 350.7 km^{2}. It has 22 gram panchayats, 63 inhabited villages. Bagodar police station serves this block. Headquarters of this CD block is at Bagodar. 32.32% of the area has forest cover.

The Jamunia River originates near Bishungarh. It runs near the Grand Trunk Road from around Bagodar to past Dumri.

Tapovan - hot water source in Jamunia River

Gram panchayats in Bagodar CD block are: Dharguli, Kudar, Atka (E), Atka (W), Adwara, Mandro, Dewradih, Donaldo, Jarmune (W), Jarmune (E), Bagodardih (W), Bagodardih (E), Hesla, Trila, Oura, Beko (W), Beko (E), Kushmarja, Pokariya, Khetko, Algdiha and Choudhay Bandh.

== Demographics ==
=== Population ===
According to the 2011 Census of India, Bagodar CD Block had a total population of 158,094, all of which were rural. There were 80,722 (51%) males and 77,372 (49%) females. Population below 6 years was 28,182. Scheduled Castes numbered 16,360 (10.35%) and Scheduled Tribes numbered 3,798 (2.40%).

Large villages (with 4,000+ population) in Bagodar CD block are (2011 census figures in brackets): Bagodar (9,934), Dharguli (4,293), Mundro (4,435), Beko (15,727), Kusmarja (4,063), Hesla (5,965), Jarmune (15,269), Antkadih (13,924), Tirla (4,631) and Khetko (6,610). There is no census town in Bagodar CD Block.

=== Literacy ===
As of 2011 census the total number of literate persons in Bagodar CD block was 83,704 (64.43% of the population over 6 years) out of which males numbered 52,368 (67.68% of the male population over 6 years) and females numbered 31,336 (49.02% of the female population over 6 years). The gender disparity (the difference between female and male literacy rates) was 32.54%.

As of 2011 census, literacy in Giridih district was 63.14% Literacy in Jharkhand was 66.41% in 2011. Literacy in India in 2011 was 74.04%.

See also – List of Jharkhand districts ranked by literacy rate

Literacy in CD Blocks of
Giridih district
Giridih subdivision
Giridih - 63.22%
Gandey - 56.30%
Bengabad - 59.33%
Dumri subdivision
Dumri - 63.55%
Pirtand - 47.22%
Bagodar Saria subdivision
Bagodar - 64.43%
Suriya - 66.25%
Birni - 61.47%
Khori Mahua subdivision
Dhanwar - 65.44%
Jamua - 63.99%
Deori - 62.54%
Tisri - 55.27%
Gawan - 60.94 %
Source: 2011 Census: CD Block Wise
Primary Census Abstract Data

=== Language and religion ===
Religions in Bagodar CD block (2011)
Religion	Percent
Hinduism	82.11%
Islam	17.54%
Other or not stated	0.35%

Languages of Bagodar CD block (2011)
1. Khortha (81.5%)
2. Hindi (9.28%)
3. Urdu (7.28%)
4. Santali (1.74%)
5. Others (0.22%)

Khortha is the main spoken language. Hindi is the official language. Urdu and Santali are also spoken.

== Rural poverty ==
40-50% of the population of Giridih district were in the BPL category in 2004–2005, being in the same category as Godda, Koderma and Hazaribagh districts. Rural poverty in Jharkhand declined from 66% in 1993–94 to 46% in 2004–05. In 2011, it has come down to 39.1%.

== Economy ==
=== Livelihood ===
Livelihood
in Bagodar CD block
1. Cultivators (37.4%)
2. Agricultural labourers (37.7%)
3. Household industries (3.08%)
4. Other Workers (21.8%)

In Bagodar CD block in 2011, amongst the class of total workers, cultivators numbered 25,008 and formed 37.42%, agricultural labourers numbered 25,224 and formed 37.74%, household industry workers numbered 2,059 and formed 3.08% and other workers numbered 14,540 and formed 21.76%. Total workers numbered 66,831 and formed 42.27% of the total population, and non-workers numbered 91,263 and formed 57.73% of the population.

Note: In the census records a person is considered a cultivator, if the person is engaged in cultivation/ supervision of land owned. When a person who works on another person's land for wages in cash or kind or share, is regarded as an agricultural labourer. Household industry is defined as an industry conducted by one or more members of the family within the household or village, and one that does not qualify for registration as a factory under the Factories Act. Other workers are persons engaged in some economic activity other than cultivators, agricultural labourers and household workers. It includes factory, mining, plantation, transport and office workers, those engaged in business and commerce, teachers, entertainment artistes and so on.

=== Infrastructure ===
There are 63 inhabited villages in Bagodar CD block. In 2011, 50 villages had power supply. 6 villages had tap water (treated/ untreated), 62 villages had well water (covered/ uncovered), 61 villages had hand pumps, and all villages had drinking water facility. 22 villages had post offices, 13 villages had a sub post office, 9 villages had telephones (land lines) and 21 villages had mobile phone coverage. 63 villages had pucca (paved) village roads, 9 villages had bus service (public/ private), 10 villages had autos/ modified autos, and 14 villages had tractors. 8 villages had bank branches, 3 villages had agricultural credit societies, 2 villages had cinema/ video halls, 2 villages had public library and public reading rooms. 24 villages had public distribution system, 13 villages had weekly haat (market) and 25 villages had assembly polling stations.

=== Agriculture ===
Hills occupy a large portion of Giridih district. The soil is generally rocky and sandy and that helps jungles and bushes to grow. The forest area, forming a large portion of total area, in the district is evenly distributed all over. Some areas near the rivers have alluvial soil. In Bagodar CD block, the percentage of cultivable area to total area is 47.51%. It is the highest amongst all CD blocks in the district. The percentage of cultivable area to the total area for the district, as a whole, is 27.04%. Irrigation is inadequate. The percentage of irrigated area to cultivable area in Bagodar CD Block is 1.76%, the lowest amongst all CD blocks in the district. May to October is the Kharif season, followed by the Rabi season. Rice, sown in 50% of the gross sown area, is the main crop in the district. Other important crops grown are: maize, wheat, sugar cane, pulses and vegetables.

=== Mica and coal mines ===
Mica and coal are mined in Bagodar CD block.

=== Backward Regions Grant Fund ===
Giridih district is listed as a backward region and receives financial support from the Backward Regions Grant Fund. The fund created by the Government of India is designed to redress regional imbalances in development. As of 2012, 272 districts across the country were listed under this scheme. The list includes 21 districts of Jharkhand.

== Transport ==
NH 19 (old numbering NH 2)/ Grand Trunk Road and the Hazaribag town-Hazaribagh Road railway station road passes through this CD block.

The Asansol-Gaya section, passes through this block. There are stations at Chichaki and Chaudhurybandh.

== Education ==
Bagodar CD block had 21 villages with pre-primary schools, 60 villages with primary schools, 33 villages with middle schools, 11 villages with secondary schools, 2 villages with senior secondary schools, 2 villages with no educational facility.
.*Senior secondary schools are also known as Inter colleges in Jharkhand

== Healthcare ==
Bagodar CD block had 1 village with community health centre, 6 village with primary health centre, 11 villages with primary health subcentres, 2 village with maternity and child welfare centre, 1 village with allopathic hospital, 1 village with dispensary, 1 village with veterinary hospital, 2 village with family welfare centre, 6 villages with medicine shops.
.*Private medical practitioners, alternative medicine etc. not included
