= Harihar Narayan Prabhakar =

Indian politician

Harihar Narayan Prabhakar is an Indian politician. He has represented the Dhanwar Legislative Assembly seat, winning elections on the tickets of three different parties.

Prabhakar became an activist of the Communist Party of India (CPI) in 1952. He studied at Ranchi University, obtaining Master of Arts and LLB degrees. He graduated from the university in 1960. As a private candidate, he obtained his master's degree in History in 1964.

In 1964, he was appointed headmaster of the Jaridih High School (near Dhanwar). In 1967 he left the CPI. Two years later he joined the Bharatiya Jan Sangh. In 1972, he became a full-time political worker as the district organising secretary of the party in Giridih District. In the same year he contested the Dhanwar Legislative Assembly seat, as a candidate of Bharatiya Jan Sangh. He finished in third position in the constituency.

By 1977, Bharatiya Jan Sangh had merged into the Janata Party. Prabhakar contested the 1977 Bihar Legislative Assembly election as the Janata Party candidate, winning the Dhanwar seat. He was, however, defeated in the 1980 election. (as a Bharatiya Janata Party candidate). He contested a 1981 by-poll in the neighbouring Giridih Legislative Assembly constituency (on a BJP ticket). However, in the Giridih constituency he was largely unknown to the voters. Moreover, he received little help from the local BJP organisation (which was dominated by Mahuri caste and distrusted Prabhakar as a Bhumihar candidate imposed upon them) in the campaign. Prabhakar finished third with 5,268 votes.

He won back the Dhanwar seat in the 1985 elections (on a BJP ticket), with 15,464 votes (26% of the votes in the constituency).

In 1990, he won the Dhanwar seat again, this time as a candidate of the Indian National Congress. Prabhakar returned to BJP. He became the secretary of the Bihar state unit of BJP. In December 2004 he resigned from BJP, citing dissatisfaction with how the party had handled corruption allegations against Industries Minister Ravindra Rai. Prabhakar joined the Lok Jan Shakti Party. He contested the Dhanwar seat as a Lok Jan Shakti Party candidate in the 2005 elections, trailing in fourth place with 5,192 votes.
