= Gawan (disambiguation) =

Gawan is a town and a nagar panchayat in Budaun district in the state of Uttar Pradesh, India.

Gawan may also refer to:

- Gawan block, Giridih district, Jharkhand, India
- Gawan, Giridih, Giridih district, Jharkhand, India
- An alternate spelling for Gawain, a Knight of the Round Table in Arthurian legend
