= Dhanwar =

Dhanwar may refer to:

- Dhanwar language (disambiguation)
- Dhanwar, Giridih, a town in Jharkhand, India
  - Dhanwar (community development block), Khori Mahuwa subdivision, Giridih district, Jharkhand
  - Dhanwar (Vidhan Sabha constituency), Jharkhand
