= Kedar Hazra =

Indian politician

Member of Jharkhand Legislative Assembly
- In office 2014–2024
- Preceded by: Chandrika Mahtha
- Succeeded by: Manju Kumari
- Constituency: Jamua
- In office 2005–2009
- Preceded by: Baldeo Hazra
- Succeeded by: Chandrika Mahtha
- Constituency: Jamua

Personal details
- Party: Bharatiya Janata Party
- Profession: Politician

Kedar Hazra (born 1961) is an Indian politician from Jharkhand. He is a three time MLA from Jamua Assembly constituency, which is reserved for Scheduled Caste community, in Giridih district. He won the 2019 Jharkhand Legislative Assembly election, representing the Bharatiya Janata Party. He lost the 2024 Assembly election contesting on JMM ticket.

== Early life and education ==
Hazra is from Jamua, Giridih district, Jharkhand. His father Damar Hazra, is a farmer. He completed his graduation at Giridih College, which is affiliated with Ranchi University. But he is a farmer.

== Career ==
Hazra won from Jamua Assembly constituency representing the Bharatiya Janata Party in the 2019 Jharkhand Legislative Assembly election. He polled 58, 468 votes and defeated his nearest rival, Manju Kumari of the Indian National Congress, by a margin of 18,175 votes. He first became an MLA winning the first legislative election after the formation of the new state. In the 2005 Jharkhand Legislative Assembly election, he defeated Chandrika Mahtha of JMM, by a margin of 5,134 votes. He lost the next election in 2009, but regained the seat in 2014 Assembly election and won for the third time in 2019.
