= Khori Mahua =

- Village
- Location in Jharkhand, India Khori Mahua (India)
- Coordinates: 24.4638°N 86.0043°E
- Country: India
- State: Jharkhand
- District: Giridih

Languages(*For language details see Dhanwar (community development block)#Language and religion)
  - Official: Hindi, Urdu
- Time zone: UTC+5:30 (IST)
- PIN: 825412 (Rajdhanwar)
- Telephone/ STD code: 06556
- Lok Sabha constituency: Kodarma
- Vidhan Sabha constituency: Dhanwar
- Website: giridih.nic.in

Khori Mahua (also spelled Khorimahua or Khuri Mahaua) is a village in the Dhanwar CD block in Khuri Mahua subdivision of Giridih district in the Indian state of Jharkhand.

== Geography ==
Cities, towns and locations in the Giridih district in North Chotanagpur Division
M: municipality, CT: census town, R: rural/ urban centre, H: historical/ religious/ tourist centre
Owing to space constraints in the small map, the actual locations in a larger map may vary slightly

=== Location ===
Khori Mahua is located at 24.4638°N 86.0043°E.

Khori Mahua is 48 km from Giridih and 6 km from Rajdhanwar.

The headquarters of Khori Mahua subdivision are located at Khori Mahua.

=== Area overview ===
Giridih district is a part of the Chota Nagpur Plateau, with rocky soil and extensive forests. Most of the rivers in the district flow from the west to east, except in the northern portion where the rivers flow north and north west. The Pareshnath Hill rises to a height of 4,479 feet (1,365 m). The district has coal and mica mines. It is an overwhelmingly rural district with small pockets of urbanisation.

Note: The map alongside presents some of the notable locations in the district. All places marked in the map are linked in the larger full screen map.

== Demographics ==
According to the 2011 Census of India, Khorimahua had a total population of 1,112, of which 602 (54%) were males and 510 (46%) were females. Population in the age range 0-6 years was 253. The total number of literate persons in Khorimahua was 706 (82.19% of the population over 6 years).

== Transport ==
State Highway 13 (Jharkhand) passes through Khori Mahua.
