= Gawan, Giridih =

Gawan
- Village
- Location in Jharkhand, India Gawan (India)
- Coordinates: 24.621333°N 85.946432°E
- Country: India
- State: Jharkhand
- District: Giridih
  - Rank: 1

Population (2011)
  - Total: 7,458

Languages(*For language details see Gawan block#Language and religion)
  - Official: Hindi, Urdu
- Time zone: UTC+5:30 (IST)
- PIN: 815313 (Gawan)
- Telephone/ STD code: 06556
- Vehicle registration: JH 11
- Lok Sabha constituency: Kodarma
- Vidhan Sabha constituency: Dhanwar
- Website: giridih.nic.in

See Gawan (disambiguation) for disambiguation

Gawan is a village in the Gawan CD block in the Khori Mahuwa subdivision of the Giridih district in the Indian state of Jharkhand.

== Geography ==
Cities, towns and locations in the Giridih district in North Chotanagpur Division
M: municipality, CT: census town, R: rural/ urban centre, H: historical/ religious/ tourist centre
Owing to space constraints in the small map, the actual locations in a larger map may vary slightly

=== Location ===
Gawan is located at 24.621333°N 85.946432°E.

=== Area overview ===
Giridih district is a part of the Chota Nagpur Plateau, with rocky soil and extensive forests. Most of the rivers in the district flow from the west to east, except in the northern portion where the rivers flow north and north west. The Pareshnath Hill rises to a height of 4,479 feet (1,365 m). The district has coal and mica mines. It is an overwhelmingly rural district with small pockets of urbanisation.

Note: The map alongside presents some of the notable locations in the district. All places marked in the map are linked in the larger full screen map.

== Demographics ==
According to the 2011 Census of India, Gawan had a total population of 7,458, of which 3,917 (53%) were males and 3,541 (47%) were females. Population in the age range 0-6 years was 1,442. The total number of literates in Gawan was 4,032 (67.02% of the population over 6 years).

== Civic administration ==
=== Police station ===
Gawan police station has jurisdiction over the Gawan CD block. According to old British records, Gawan PS was there after Giridh subdivision was formed in 1870. Prior to that it had a zaminday thana.

=== CD block HQ ===
The headquarters of the Gawan CD block are located at Gawan village.
