= Mahuri =

Hindu caste

Mahuri is a Hindu caste (jāti) and the community members of Mahuri caste are scattered across India with some pockets in Bengal, Bihar and Odisha. Mahuri are reported to have migrated from the city of Mathura and surrounding rural locations to the then subah of Bengal under the Mughal Empire. As a faithful community, the Mahuri Vaishya community still continues to worship Mata Mathurasini Devi, an incarnation of Shakti, as their family deity. A set of two wind musical instruments, called Jodi Mahuri, are performed by the community members during marriages as part of Mangal Badya.

The royal scions of Mahuri estate in Berhampur, Odisha visit the temple every year to perform a ritual during Mahuri Mahotsav. Their ancestors built the Jagannath temple at Khaspa street in 1803. In 2018, Ashok Kumar Narendra Dev, son of Sishir Kumar Dev, the then king of Mahuri estate, performed the ritual of sweeping the chariot in July, a day before they were pulled by the devotees.

== See also ==
- Bhadani Nagar
- Vinodini Tarway
