= Tisri block =

Tisri Tisrī
- Community Development Block
- Location in Giridih District
- Interactive map of Tisri
- Coordinates: 24°34′10″N 86°3′32″E
- Country: India
- State: Jharkhand
- District: Giridih
- Subdivision: Khori Mahuwa
- Headquarters: Tisri, Giridih
- Panchayat: 15 (13th)

Government
  - Type: Federal democracy
  - Block Development Officer: Manish Kumar
  - Circle Officer: Akhilesh Prasad

Area
  - Total: 429.53 km^{2} (165.84 sq mi)
  - Rank: 2nd
- Elevation: 298 m (978 ft)

Population (2011)
  - Total: 95,081
  - Rank: 13th
  - Density: 221.36/km^{2} (573.32/sq mi)
  - Rank: 13th

Languages
  - Official: Hindi, Urdu
- Time zone: UTC+5:30 (IST)
- PIN: 815317 (Tisri)
- Telephone/STD code: 06556
- Vehicle registration: JH-11
- Lok Sabha constituency: Giridih
- Literacy: 55.27%
- Sex Ratio: 1005
- Website: giridih.nic.in

Tisri is a community development block (CD block) that forms an administrative division in the Khori Mahuwa subdivision of the Giridih district in the Indian state of Jharkhand.

== Overview ==
Giridih is a plateau region. The western portion of the district is part of a larger central plateau. The rest of the district is a lower plateau, a flat table land with an elevation of about 1,300 feet. At the edges, the ghats drop to about 700 feet. The Pareshnath Hill or Shikharji rises to a height of 4,480 feet in the south-eastern part of the district. The district is thickly forested. Amongst the natural resources, it has coal and mica. Inaugurating the Pradhan Mantri Ujjwala Yojana in 2016, Raghubar Das, Chief Minister of Jharkhand, had indicated that there were 23 lakh BPL families in Jharkhand. There was a plan to bring the BPL proportion in the total population down to 35%.

== Maoist activities ==
Jharkhand is one of the states affected by Maoist activities. As of 2012, Giridih was one of the 14 highly affected districts in the state.As of 2016, Giridih was identified as one of the 13 focus areas by the state police to check Maoist activities. In 2017, the Moists, in Giridih district, have torched more than 50 vehicles engaged in road construction or carrying goods.

== Geography ==
Tisri is located at 24°34′10″N 86°3′32″E.

Tisri CD block is bounded by Kawakole CD block, in Nawada district of Bihar, on the north and part of the east, Deori CD block on a part of the east and a part of the south, Dhanwar CD block on a part of the south and Gawan CD block on the west.

Tisri CD block has an area of 429.56 km^{2}. It has 15 gram panchayats, and 183 inhabited villages. Tisri and Lokainayanpur police stations serves this block. Headquarters of this CD block is at Tisri. 58.89% of the area has forest cover.

Rivers in Tisri CD block are: Kiul, Sakri, Barki and Kunda.

Gram panchayats in Tisri CD block are: Thansinghdih, Mansadih, Lokai, Belwana, Palmarua, Singho, Gumgi, Chandouri, Khatponk, Gadkura, Barwadih, Kharkhari, Bhandari, Tisri and Khijuri.

== Demographics ==
=== Population ===
According to the 2011 Census of India, Tisri CD block had a total population of 95,081, all of which were rural. There were 47,423 (50%) males and 47,658 (50%) females. Population in the age range 0–6 years was 19,292. Scheduled Castes numbered 13,037 (13.71%) and Scheduled Tribes numbered 21,114 (22.21%).

=== Literacy ===
As of 2011 census the total number of literate persons in Tisri CD block was 41,892 (55.27% of the population over 6 years) out of which males numbered 26,289 (70.05% of the male population over 6 years) and females numbered 15,603 (40.78% of the female population over 6 years). The gender disparity (the difference between female and male literacy rates) was 29.27%.

As of 2011 census, literacy in Giridih district was 63.14% Literacy in Jharkhand was 66.41% in 2011. Literacy in India in 2011 was 74.04%.

See also – List of Jharkhand districts ranked by literacy rate

Literacy in CD Blocks of
Giridih district
Giridih subdivision
Giridih - 63.22%
Gandey - 56.30%
Bengabad - 59.33%
Dumri subdivision
Dumri - 63.55%
Pirtand - 47.22%
Bagodar Saria subdivision
Bagodar - 64.43%
Suriya - 66.25%
Birni - 61.47%
Khori Mahua subdivision
Dhanwar - 65.44%
Jamua - 63.99%
Deori - 62.54%
Tisri - 55.27%
Gawan - 60.94 %
Source: 2011 Census: CD Block Wise
Primary Census Abstract Data

=== Language and religion ===
Religions in Tisri CD block (2011)
Religion	Percent
Hinduism	81.67%
Islam	13.17%
Other*	3.05%
Christianity	1.94%
Other or not stated	0.17%
*mainly tribal religions like Sarna

Languages of Tisri block (2011)
1. Khortha (74.5%)
2. Santali (21.8%)
3. Hindi (2.61%)
4. Others (1.06%)

Khortha is the main spoken language. Hindi is the official language. Santali is also spoken.

== Rural poverty ==
40-50% of the population of Giridih district were in the BPL category in 2004–2005, being in the same category as Godda, Koderma and Hazaribagh districts. Rural poverty in Jharkhand declined from 66% in 1993–94 to 46% in 2004–05. In 2011, it has come down to 39.1%.

== Economy ==
=== Livelihood ===
Livelihood
in Tisri CD block
1. Cultivators (39.7%)
2. Agricultural labourers (46.7%)
3. Household industries (1.83%)
4. Other Workers (11.8%)

In Tisri CD block in 2011, amongst the class of total workers, cultivators numbered 17,649 and formed 39.71%, agricultural labourers numbered 20,736 and formed 46.66%, household industry workers numbered 814 and formed 1.83% and other workers numbered 5,244 and formed 11.80%. Total workers numbered 44,443 and formed 46.74% of the total population, and non-workers numbered 50,638 and formed 53.26% of the population.

Note: In the census records a person is considered a cultivator, if the person is engaged in cultivation/ supervision of land owned. When a person who works on another person's land for wages in cash or kind or share, is regarded as an agricultural labourer. Household industry is defined as an industry conducted by one or more members of the family within the household or village, and one that does not qualify for registration as a factory under the Factories Act. Other workers are persons engaged in some economic activity other than cultivators, agricultural labourers and household workers. It includes factory, mining, plantation, transport and office workers, those engaged in business and commerce, teachers, entertainment artistes and so on.

=== Infrastructure ===
There are 183 inhabited villages in Tisri CD block. In 2011, 56 villages had power supply. 1 village had tap water (treated/ untreated), 181 villages had well water (covered/ uncovered), 142 villages had hand pumps, and all villages had drinking water facility. 19 villages had post offices, 6 villages had a sub post office, 7 village had telephones (land lines) and 63 villages had mobile phone coverage. 181 villages had pucca (paved) village roads, 24 villages had bus service (public/ private), 3 villages had autos/ modified autos, and 63 villages had tractors. 11 villages had bank branches, 4 villages had agricultural credit societies, no village had cinema/ video halls, no village had public library and public reading room. 26 villages had public distribution system, 6 villages had weekly haat (market) and 40 villages had assembly polling stations.

=== Agriculture ===
Hills occupy a large portion of Giridih district. The soil is generally rocky and sandy and that helps jungles and bushes to grow. The forest area, forming a large portion of total area, in the district is evenly distributed all over. Some areas near the rivers have alluvial soil. In Tisri CD block, the percentage of cultivable area to total area is 28.40%. The percentage of cultivable area to the total area for the district as a whole is 27.04%. Irrigation is inadequate. The percentage of irrigated area to cultivable area in Tisri CD block is 6.85%. May to October is the Kharif season, followed by the Rabi season. Rice, sown in 50% of the gross sown area, is the main crop in the district. Other important crops grown are: maize, wheat, sugar cane, pulses and vegetables.

=== Mica mines ===
Gawan and Tisri CD blocks are home to mica mines.

=== Backward Regions Grant Fund ===
Giridih district is listed as a backward region and receives financial support from the Backward Regions Grant Fund. The fund created by the Government of India is designed to redress regional imbalances in development. As of 2012, 272 districts across the country were listed under this scheme. The list includes 21 districts of Jharkhand.

== Education ==
Tisri CD block had 8 villages with pre-primary schools, 109 villages with primary schools, 49 villages with middle schools, 5 villages with secondary schools, 1 village with senior secondary school, 74 villages with no educational facility.
.*Senior secondary schools are also known as Inter colleges in Jharkhand

== Healthcare ==
Tisri CD block had 1 village with community health centre, 20 villages with primary health subcentres, 11 villages with maternity and child welfare centres, 2 villages with dispensaries, 6 villages with medicine shops.
.*Private medical practitioners, alternative medicine etc. not included
