= Khori Mahuwa subdivision =

Khori Mahuwa (rajdhanwar) subdivision
- Subdivision
- Location in Jharkhand, India Khori Mahuwa (rajdhanwar) subdivision (India)
- Coordinates: 24.420000°N 85.980000°E
- Country: India
- State: Jharkhand
- District: Giridih
- Headquarters: Khori Mahua

Government
  - Type: Representative democracy

Area
  - Total: 2,020.73 km^{2} (780.21 sq mi)

Population (2027)
  - Total: 1,324,567
  - Density: 655.489/km^{2} (1,697.71/sq mi)

Languages
  - Official: Hindi, Urdu
- Time zone: UTC+5:30 (IST)
- Website: giridih.nic.in

Khori Mahuwa (rajdhanwar ) subdivision (also spelled Khuri Mahua) is an administrative subdivision of the Giridih district in the state of Jharkhand, India.Khori Mahua is located in Dhanwar block.Subdivision office is located at Domaidih village, which is 10 km from Dhanwar town and 3 km from khorimahua chowk on State Highway 13 (Giridih-koderma road). Khorimahua subdivision is located in Dhanwar. Rajdhanwar (Khori mahua) subdivision's population is in between 13 to 14 lakh which is ahead of bermo subdivision in jharkhand by 2026.Now in 2026 Khorimahua subdivision is largest subdivision in population by 2026 leaving behind bermo subdivision in subdivision population in jharkhand.This data is only for subdivision not for district 's subdivision.

== History ==
Khori Mahuwa subdivision was created in March 2014.

Cities, towns and locations in the Giridih district in North Chotanagpur Division
M: municipality, CT: census town, R: rural/ urban centre, H: historical/ religious/ tourist centre
Owing to space constraints in the small map, the actual locations in a larger map may vary slightly

== Subdivisions ==
Giridih district is divided into the following administrative subdivisions:

Subdivision	Headquarters	Area km^{2} (2001)	Population (2011)	Rural population % (2011)	Urban population % (2011)
Khori Mahuwa	Khori Mahua	2020.73	932,485	98.95	1.05
Bagodar-Saria	Suriya	864.04	476,613	96.02	3.98
Dumri	Dumri	820.15	335,521	95.23	4.77
Giridih Sadar	Giridih	1148.64	700,855	93.17	6.83

== Police stations ==
Police stations in Khori Mahuwa subdivision have the following features and jurisdiction:

Police station	Area covered km^{2}	Municipal town	CD Block
Dhanwar	n/a	-	Dhanwar
Ghorthamba	n/a	-	Dhanwar
Jamua	n/a	-	Jamua
Hirodih	n/a	-	Jamua
Deori	n/a	-	Deori
Bhelwaghati	n/a	-	Deori
Tisri	n/a	-	Tisri
Lokainayanpur	n/a	-	Tisri
Gawan	n/a	-	Gawan

== Blocks ==
Community development blocks in Khori Mahuwa subdivision are:

CD Block	Headquarters	Area km^{2}	Population (2011)	SC %	ST %	Hindus %	Muslims %	Literacy rate %	Census Towns
Dhanwar	Dhanwar	352.40	267,352	13.17	0.77	72.92	26.87	65.44	Dhanwar
Jamua	Jamua	478.47	271,563	15.39	0.99	78.90	20.78	63.99	Jamua
Tisri	Tisri	429.56	95,081	13.71	22.21	81.67	13.17	55.27	Tisri
Deori	Deori	423.61	182,527	15.40	12.35	82.98	11.65	62.54	Deori
Gawan	Gawan	336.70	115,962	16.31	4.57	80.60	18.85	60.94	Gawan

== Education ==
Statistics in the table below offer a comprehensive picture of the education scenario in Giridih district:

Subdivision	Primary School		Middle School		High School		Higher Secondary School		General College, Univ		Technical / Professional Instt		Non-formal Education	
Subdivision	Institution	Student	Institution	Student	Institution	Student	Institution	Student	Institution	Student	Institution	Student	Institution	Student
Khori Mahuwa subdivision	905	133,026	508	49,979	73	24,318	8	13,067	1	1,568	-	-	-	-
Dumri	342	43,033	209	18,561	27	8,901	4	6,673	-	-	-	-	-	-
Bagodar Saria	333	54,217	225	23,670	53	11,943	3	2,817	-	-	-	-	-	-
Giridih Sadar	590	80,952	314	33,912	50	19,187	6	11,701	2	7098	5	447	-	-
Giridih district	2,170	311,228	1,256	126,122	203	64,349	21	34,258	3	8,676	5	447	-	-

=== Educational institutions ===
The following institutions are located in Khori Mahuwa subdivision:

- Adarsh College was established at Rajdhanwar in 1973. It is third college in giridih which is pursuing master of arts degree.
- Sanskrit Hindi Vidyapith was established at Jharkhand Dham, Giridih, in 1967. It is an institute specializing in Sanskrit, but also offers other courses. It is affiliated to Vinoba Bhave University. It has hostel facilities.
- Langtababa Mahavidyalaya was established at Mirzaganj, Giridih, in 1983. It is affiliated to Vinoba Bhave University. (It is not clear what courses it offers).
