= Sariya, Giridih =

Sariya Hazaribagh Road railway station
- Village
- Location in Jharkhand, India Sariya (India)
- Coordinates: 24.184361°N 85.891528°E
- Country: India
- State: Jharkhand
- District: Giridih

Languages (*For language details see Sariya (community development block)#Language and religion)
  - Official: Hindi
- Time zone: UTC+5:30 (IST)
- PIN: 825320
- Telephone/ STD code: 06557
- Lok Sabha constituency: Kodarma
- Vidhan Sabha constituency: Bagodar
- Website: giridih.nic.in

Sariya is an inhabited place not identified as a separate place in the 2011 census, in the Sariya CD block in the Bagodar-Saria subdivision of the Giridih district in the Indian state of Jharkhand.

== Geography ==
Cities, towns and locations in the Giridih district in North Chotanagpur Division
M: municipality, CT: census town, R: rural/ urban centre, H: historical/ religious/ tourist centre
Owing to space constraints in the small map, the actual locations in a larger map may vary slightly

=== Location ===
Sariya is located at 24.184361°N 85.891528°E.

According to the map of Sariya CD block in the District Census Handbook 2011, Giridih, Sariya seems to be a part of Barki Saraiya.

=== Area overview ===
Giridih district is a part of the Chota Nagpur Plateau, with rocky soil and extensive forests. Most of the rivers in the district flow from the west to east, except in the northern portion where the rivers flow north and north west. The Pareshnath Hill rises to a height of 4,479 feet (1,365 m). The district has coal and mica mines. It is an overwhelmingly rural district with small pockets of urbanisation.

Note: The map alongside presents some of the notable locations in the district. All places marked in the map are linked in the larger full screen map.

== Civic administration ==
=== Police station ===
Sariya police station has jurisdiction over the Sariya CD block.

=== CD block HQ ===
The headquarters of Sariya CD block are located at Sariya.

== Transport ==
Hazaribagh Road railway station is on the Asansol-Gaya section, a part of the Grand Chord, Howrah-Gaya-Delhi line and Howrah-Allahabad-Mumbai line.

== Education ==
Sariya College was established at Sariya in 1984. It is affiliated with Vinoba Bhave University and offers courses in arts and commerce.

SRK DAV Public School is situated near Bagodih Sariya and affiliated with CBSE New Delhi. It has facilities for teaching from LKG to class XII.

+2 Sardar Ram Singh Sripati Ram(SRSSR) High school is located in main city of Sariya. It is a boys High school and it's offers courses, High School (9th and 10th, only for boys) and also Arts, Commerce and Science for both girls and Boys (+2 level) .
