= Sukar Ravidas =

Indian politician

Member of Jharkhand Legislative Assembly
- In office 1995–2000
- Preceded by: Baldeo Hazra
- Succeeded by: Baldeo Hazra
- Constituency: Jamua

Personal details
- Born: 1962 (age 63–64) Giridih, Jharkhand, India
- Party: Bhartiya Janata Party
- Occupation: MLA
- Profession: Politician

Sukar Ravidas is an Indian politician who belongs to the Bharatiya Janata Party.

== Personal life ==
Ravidas was born into a Dalit family at Nawadih vill., Jamua, Giridih, Jharkhand.

His daughter Dr.Manju Kumari is also a politician who was associated with JVD and later joined INC. She was also a candidate for 2014 and 2019 Jharkhand Legislative Assembly elections from Jamua seat but lost to Kedar Hazra of BJP.

== Politics ==
He joined Jan Sangh in 1970 and worked from the lower level in the party. In 1977, he joined Janata Dal after its formation.

He elected for the first time in 1977 Bihar Legislative Assembly elections from Jamua constituency.

In 1980 he became member of Bharatiya Janata Party and in 1995 got again elected from Jamua constituency.

In 2005, he joined Rashtriya Janata Dal and was the nominated candidate from Jamua but he lost to Kedar Hazra of BJP. In 2014 he joined Jharkhand Mukti Morcha then re-joined BJP in 2017 and left the party in 2019 to campaign for his daughter who was a Congress candidate.
