= Lokainayanpur =

- Village
- Location in Jharkhand, India Lokainayanpur (India)
- Coordinates: 24.655444°N 86.00488°E
- Country: India
- State: Jharkhand
- District: Giridih

Languages(*For language details see Tisri block#Language and religion)
  - Official: Hindi, Urdu
- Time zone: UTC+5:30 (IST)
- PIN: 815317 (Tisri)
- Telephone/ STD code: 06556
- Vehicle registration: JH 11
- Website: giridih.nic.in

Lokainayanpur is a set of two adjacent villages in the Tisri CD block in the Khori Mahuwa subdivision of the Giridih district in the Indian state of Jharkhand.

== Geography ==
Cities, towns and locations in the Giridih district in North Chotanagpur Division
M: municipality, CT: census town, R: rural/ urban centre, H: historical/ religious/ tourist centre
Owing to space constraints in the small map, the actual locations in a larger map may vary slightly

=== Location ===
Lokainayanpur is located at 24.655444°N 86.00488°E.

=== Area overview ===
Giridih district is a part of the Chota Nagpur Plateau, with rocky soil and extensive forests. Most of the rivers in the district flow from the west to east, except in the northern portion where the rivers flow north and north west. The Pareshnath Hill rises to a height of 4,479 feet (1,365 m). The district has coal and mica mines. It is an overwhelmingly rural district with small pockets of urbanisation.

Note: The map alongside presents some of the notable locations in the district. All places marked in the map are linked in the larger full screen map.

== Demographics ==
According to the 2011 Census of India, Laukai had a total population of 1,276, of which 667 (52%) were males and 609 (48%) were females. Population in the age range 0-6 years was 232. The total number of literate persons in Laukai was 687 (65.80% of the population over 6 years). Nayanpur had a total population of 826, of which 444 (54%) were males and 382 (46%) were females. Population in the age range 0-6 years was 168. The total number of literate persons in Nayanpur was 344 (52.28% of the population over 6 years.

== Civic administration ==
=== Police station ===
Lokainayanpur police station has jurisdiction over the Tisri CD block.
