= Dhanwar language =

Dhanwar may be:

- Dhanwar Rai language or Danwar language, an Indo-Aryan language of Nepal
- Dhanwar language (India), a purported language of the Dhanwar people of India, which does not actually exist

== See also ==
- Dhanwar (disambiguation)
