= Gawan =

Gawan Gowan
- town
- Location in Uttar Pradesh, India Gawan (India)
- Coordinates: 28.43°N 78.35°E
- Country: India
- State: Uttar Pradesh
- District: Sambhal

Government
  - Type: Nagar Panchayat
  - Body: Nagar Panchayat

Area
  - Total: 3.5 km^{2} (1.4 sq mi)
- Elevation: 193 m (633 ft)

Population (2011)
  - Total: 9,568
  - Density: 2,733.7/km^{2} (7,080/sq mi)

Languages
  - Official: Hindi
- Time zone: UTC+5:30 (IST)
- Postal code: 243727
- Vehicle registration: UP
- Website: up.gov.in

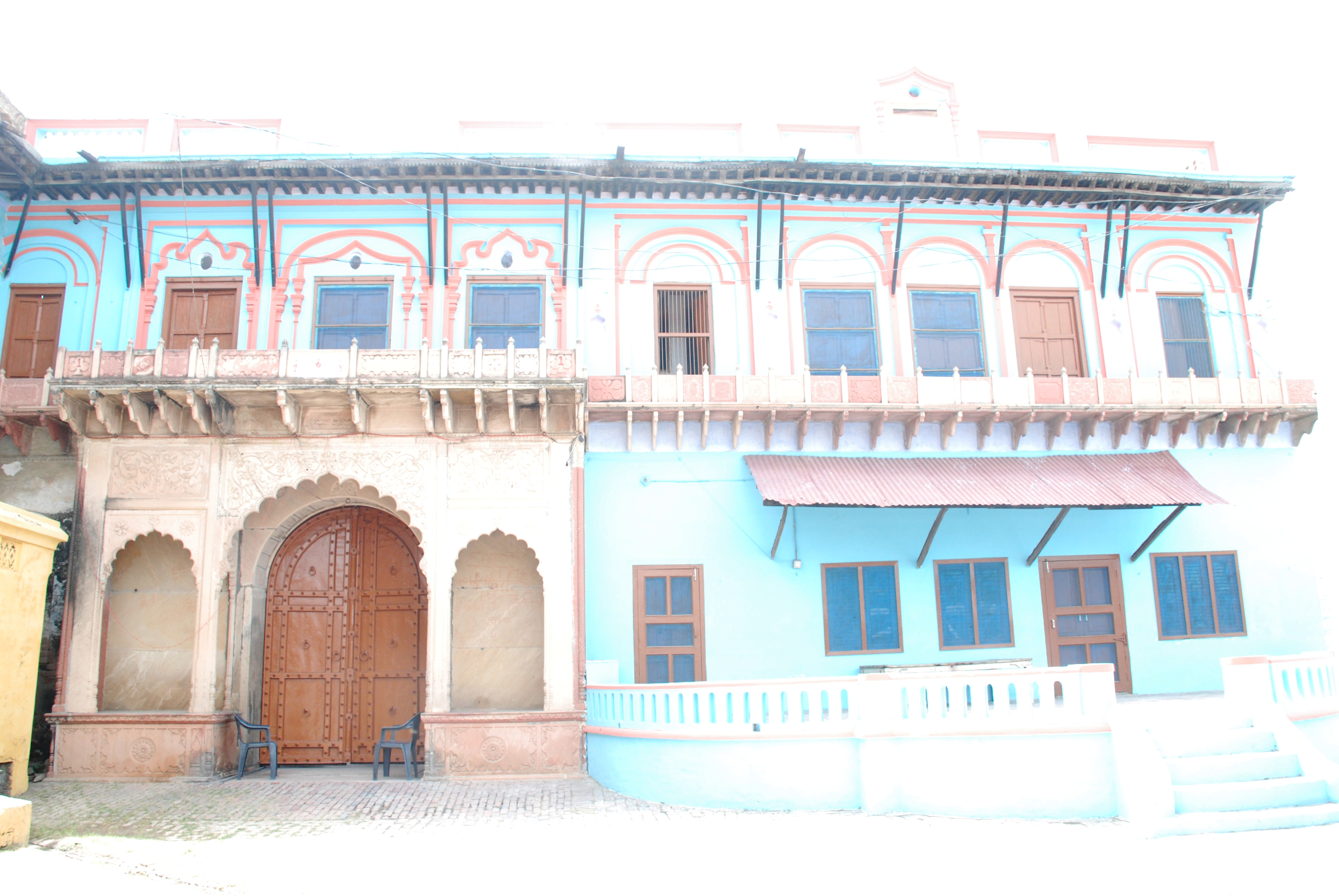
Haweli of Agrawal's (Naake wali Kothi)

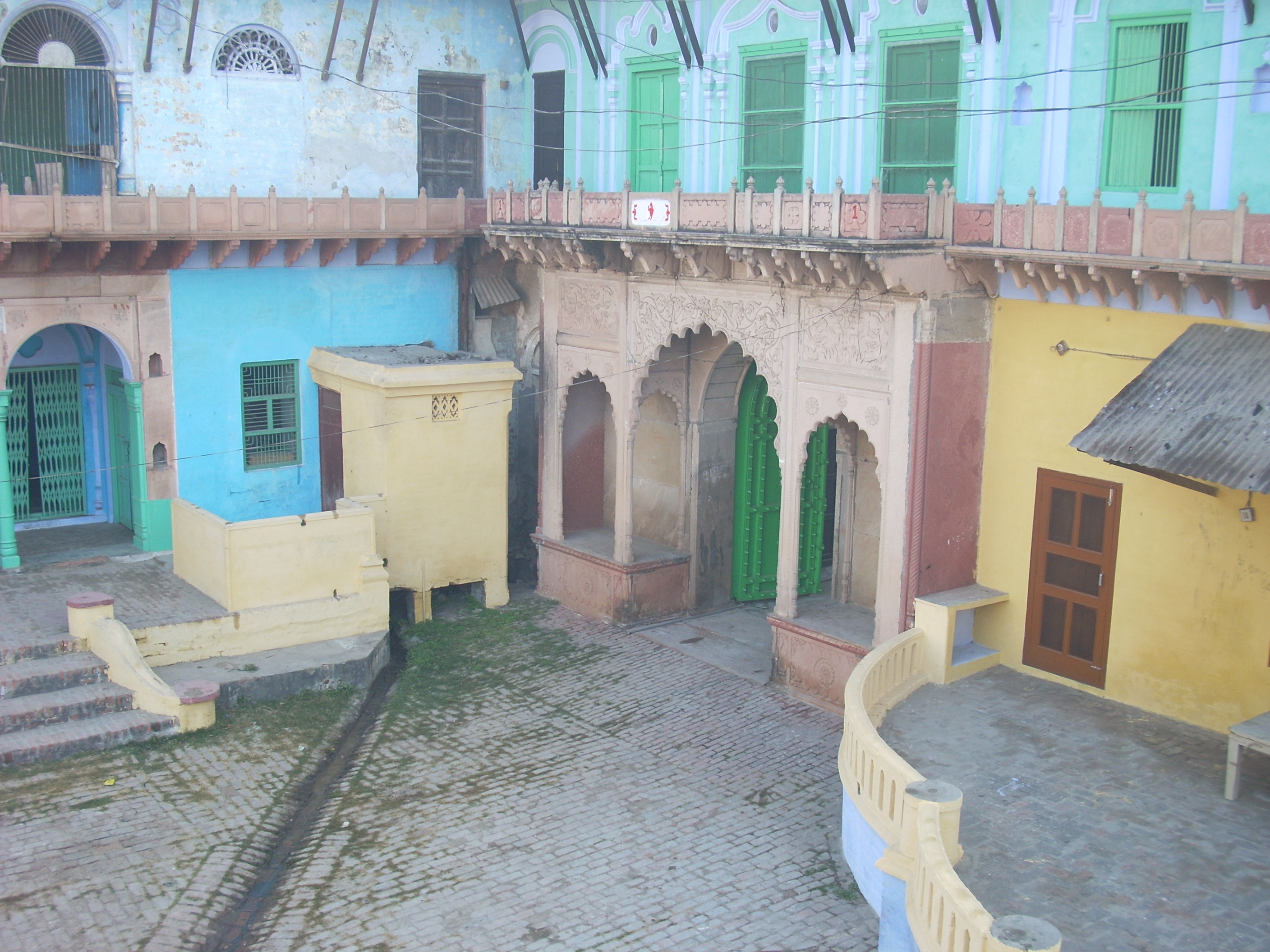
Another view of Haweli of Agrawal's

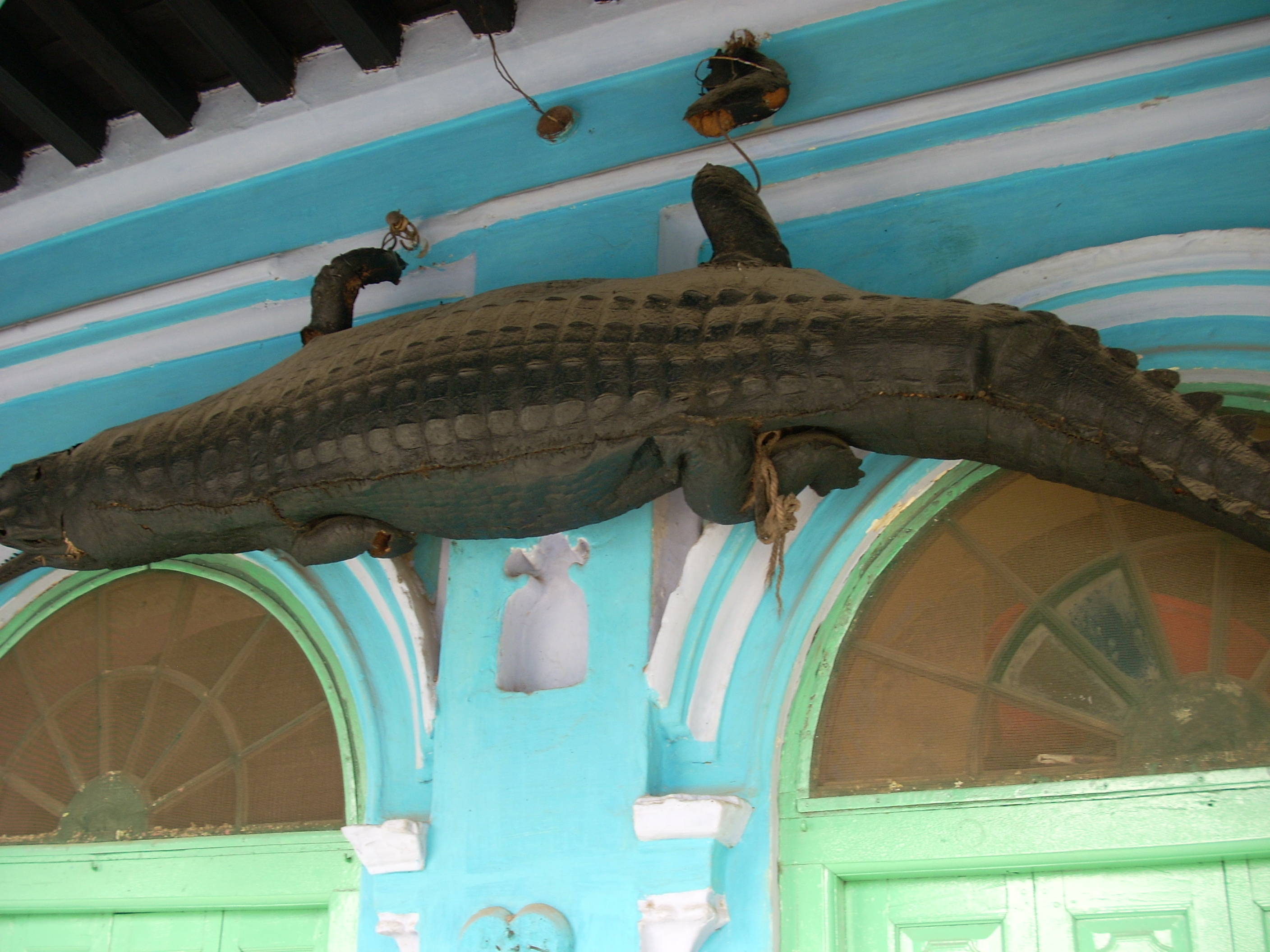
A century old alligator carcass at Haweli of Agrawal's

Gawan is a town and a nagar panchayat in Sambhal district in the state of Uttar Pradesh, India.

There is holy palace known as Hari Baba Bandh and it is near the Ganges River. In the month of march near Holi there is big festival (Mela) of Rasslila organised at Hari Baba Bandh. According to history it was a royal estate and seat of power of Agrawal and Singh dynasties. Still there are many Hawelis, Gadis and other historical monuments.

== Geography ==
Gawan is located at 28.43°N 78.35°E. Its average elevation is 193 metres (633 feet).

== Demographics ==
As of 2011 India census, Gawan had a population of 9568. Males constitute 53% of the population and females 47%. Gawan has an average literacy rate of 42%, lower than the national average of 59.5%: male literacy is 50%, and female literacy is 32%. In Gawan, 19% of the population is under 6 years of age.

Religions in Gawan
Religion	Percent
Hindus	75%
Muslims	24.95%
Jains	0.5%
Others†	0.5%
Distribution of religions †Includes Sikhs (0.2%), Buddhists (<0.2%).
