= Jamua =

- Village
- Location in Jharkhand, India Jamua (India)
- Coordinates: 24.370278°N 86.147512°E
- Country: India
- State: Jharkhand
- District: Giridih

Population (2011)
  - Total: 1,124

Languages(*For language details see Jamua (community development block)#Language and religion)
  - Official: Hindi, Urdu
- Time zone: UTC+5:30 (IST)
- PIN: 815318 (Jamua)
- Telephone/ STD code: 06554
- Vehicle registration: JH 11
- Lok Sabha constituency: Kodarma
- Vidhan Sabha constituency: Jamua
- Website: giridih.nic.in

Jamua is a village in the Jamua CD block in the Khori Mahuwa subdivision of the Giridih district in the Indian state of Jharkhand.

== Geography ==
Cities, towns and locations in the Giridih district in North Chotanagpur Division
M: municipality, CT: census town, R: rural/ urban centre, H: historical/ religious/ tourist centre
Owing to space constraints in the small map, the actual locations in a larger map may vary slightly

=== Location ===
Jamua is located at 24.370278°N 86.147512°E.

=== Area overview ===
Giridih district is a part of the Chota Nagpur Plateau, with rocky soil and extensive forests. Most of the rivers in the district flow from the west to east, except in the northern portion where the rivers flow north and north west. The Pareshnath Hill rises to a height of 4,479 feet (1,365 m). The district has coal and mica mines. It is an overwhelmingly rural district with small pockets of urbanisation.

Note: The map alongside presents some of the notable locations in the district. All places marked in the map are linked in the larger full screen map.

== Demographics ==
According to the 2011 Census of India, Jamua had a total population of 1,124, of which 574 (51%) were males and 550 (49%) were females. Population in the age range 0-6 years was 213. The total number of literate persons in Jamua was 677 (74.31% of the population over 6 years).

== Civic administration ==
=== Police station ===
Jamua police station has jurisdiction over the Jamua CD block. According to old British records, Jamua PS was there after Giridh subdivision was formed in 1870.

=== CD block HQ ===
The headquarters of the Jamua CD block are located at Jamua village.

== Transport ==
Jamua-Deoghar Road meets State Highway 13 (Jharkhand), running from Koderma to Gobindpur at Jamua.

There is a station at Jamua on the Madhupur-Giridih-Koderma line.
