= Hazaribagh Road railway station =

Railway station in Jharkhand, India

HAZARIBAGH ROAD

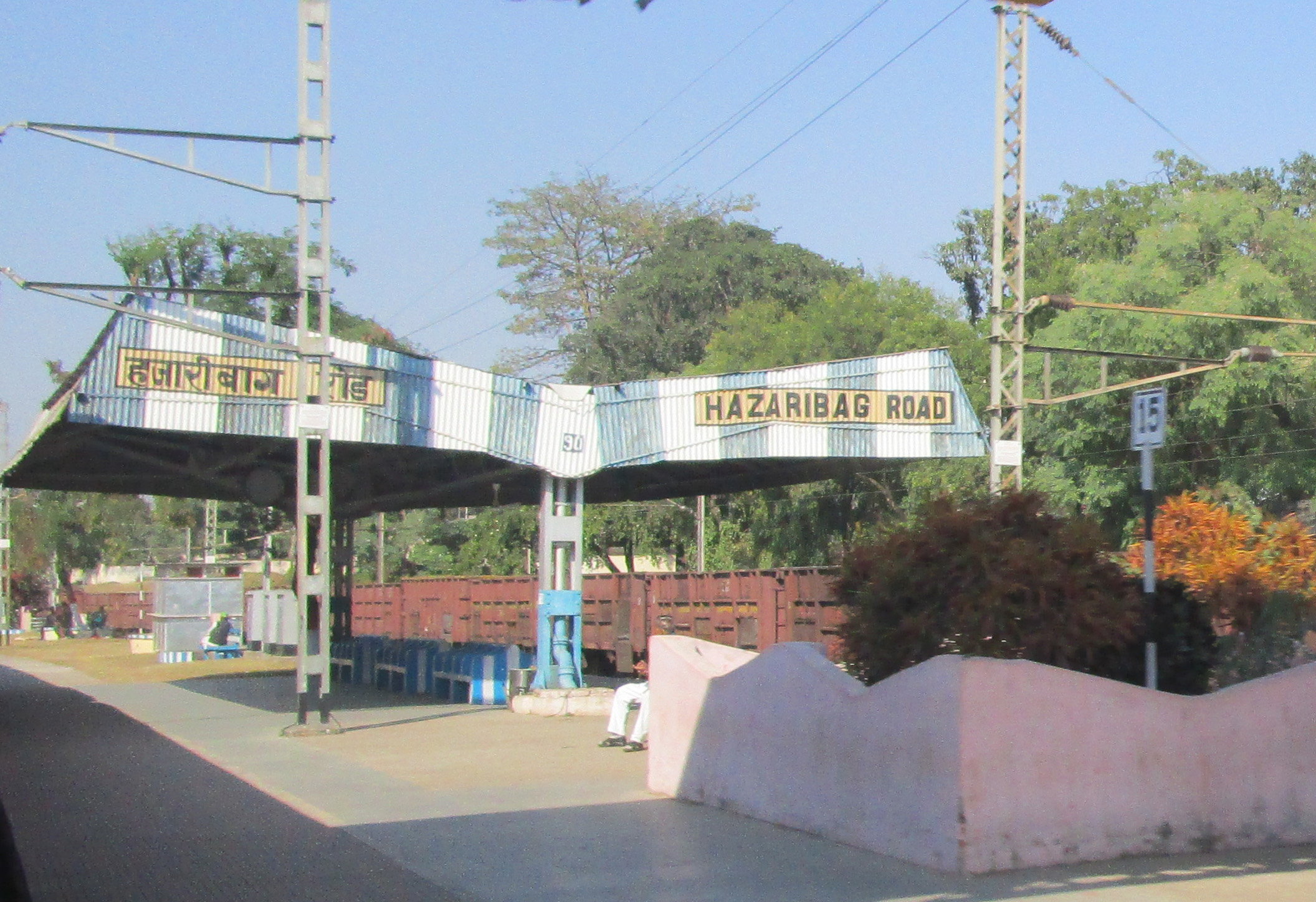
- Hazaribagh Road railway station platform

General information
- Location: Sariya, Giridih district, Jharkhand; India
- Coordinates: 24°10′28″N 85°53′30″E
- Elevation: 330 metres (1,080 ft)
- System: Indian Railways station
- Lines: Grand Chord; Asansol–Gaya section Howrah–Gaya–Delhi line Howrah–Allahabad–Mumbai line
- Platforms: 4
- Connections: Bus service to Hazaribagh

Construction
- Structure type: Standard (on-ground station)
- Parking: Available

Other information
- Status: Functioning
- Station code: HZD
- Zone(s): East Central Railway
- Division(s): Dhanbad

History
- Opened: 1906
- Electrified: 1961–62
- Former names: East Indian Railway, Eastern Railway
Location

Hazaribagh Road is a railway station on the Grand Chord line of East Central Railway. The place is locally known as Sariya, in Sariya CD Block in Bagodar-Saria subdivision in Giridih district in the Indian state of Jharkhand.

== Geography ==
Hazaribagh Road or Saria is located at 24°10′28″N 85°53′30″E.

Bagodar on National Highway 19 (old numbering NH 2) / Grand Trunk Road is 13 kilometres (8.1 mi) and Hazaribagh is 64 kilometres (40 mi) from Hazaribagh Road.

== History ==
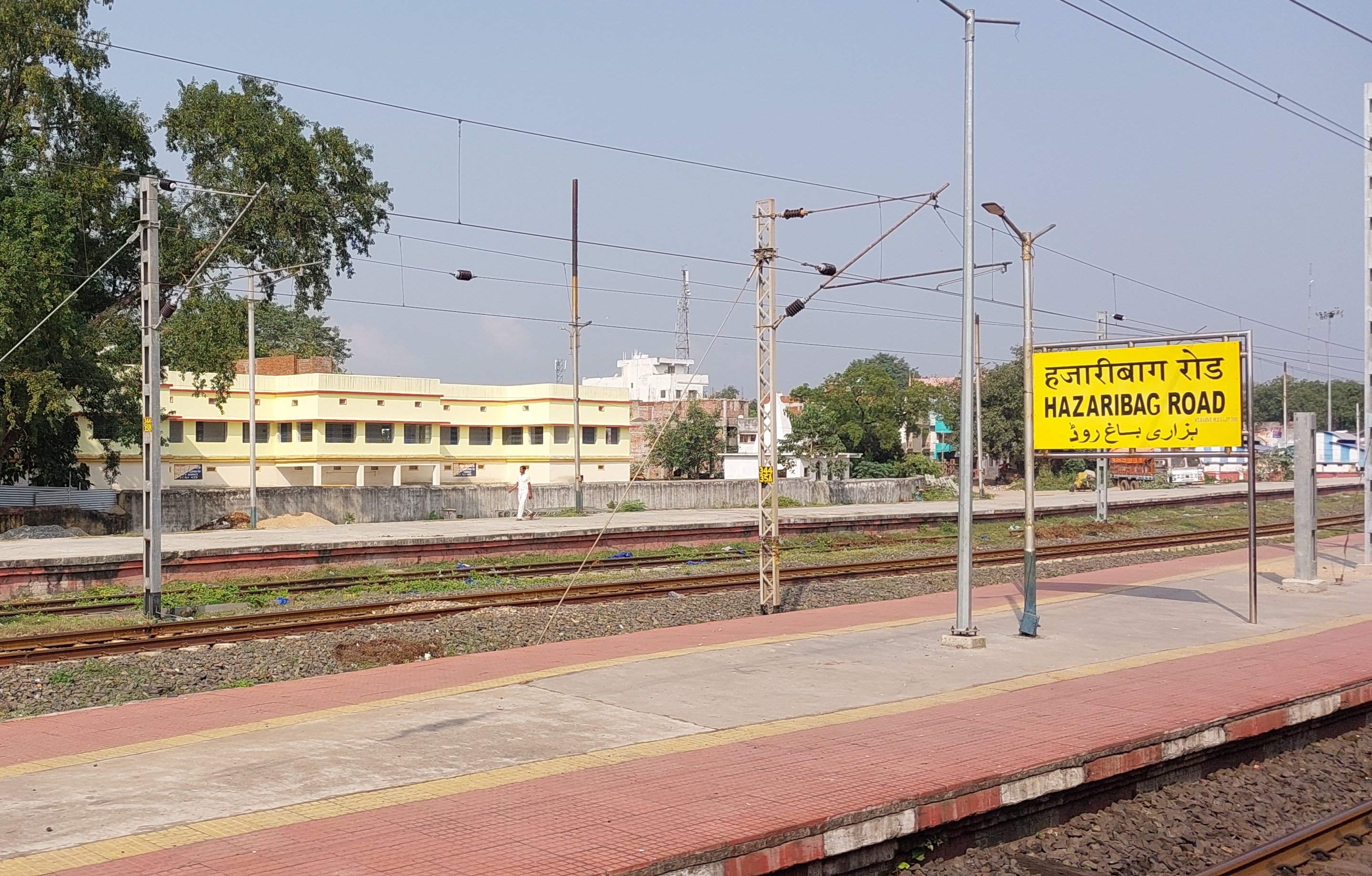
Hazaribagh Road railway station

With the extension of railways to Barakar in 1856, that town became the railhead for the vast hinterland that lay beyond it. In 1871, Giridih was connected to Madhupur on the Howrah–Delhi main line, through a branch line. Giridih served as the railhead for Hazaribagh and other places in the area till the Grand Chord line was laid. Hazaribagh Road station, along with the Grand Chord, was opened in February 1907 (1906 according to some railway related sources). While both Hazaribagh Road and Koderma were connected with Hazaribagh by metalled roads and they were about equally distant from what was then the headquarters of a large district. Hazaribagh Road was, however, the station ordinarily used, as it was considerably nearer to Kolkata. Now that Hazaribagh town is on Indian Railways map after the completion of Koderma–Hazaribagh–Barkakana–Ranchi line, there have been demands to rename Hazaribagh Road railway station as "Sariya" railway station.

== Electrification ==
The Gomoh–Koderma sector was electrified in 1961–62.

| Preceding station | Indian Railways | Following station |
|---|---|---|
| Chichaki towards ? | East Central Railway zone Asansol–Gaya section | Chaube towards ? |
