= Vinodini Terway =

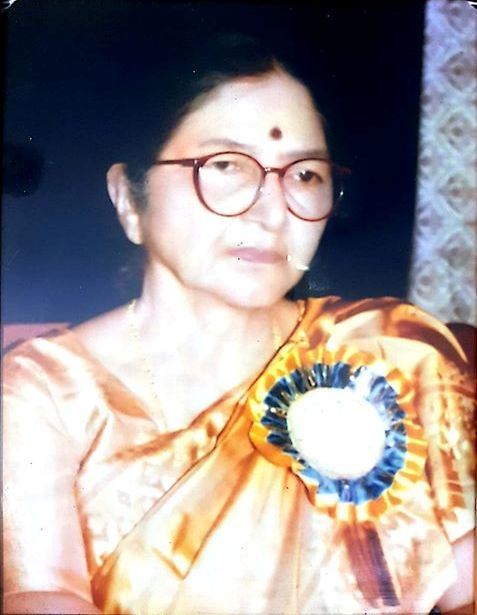

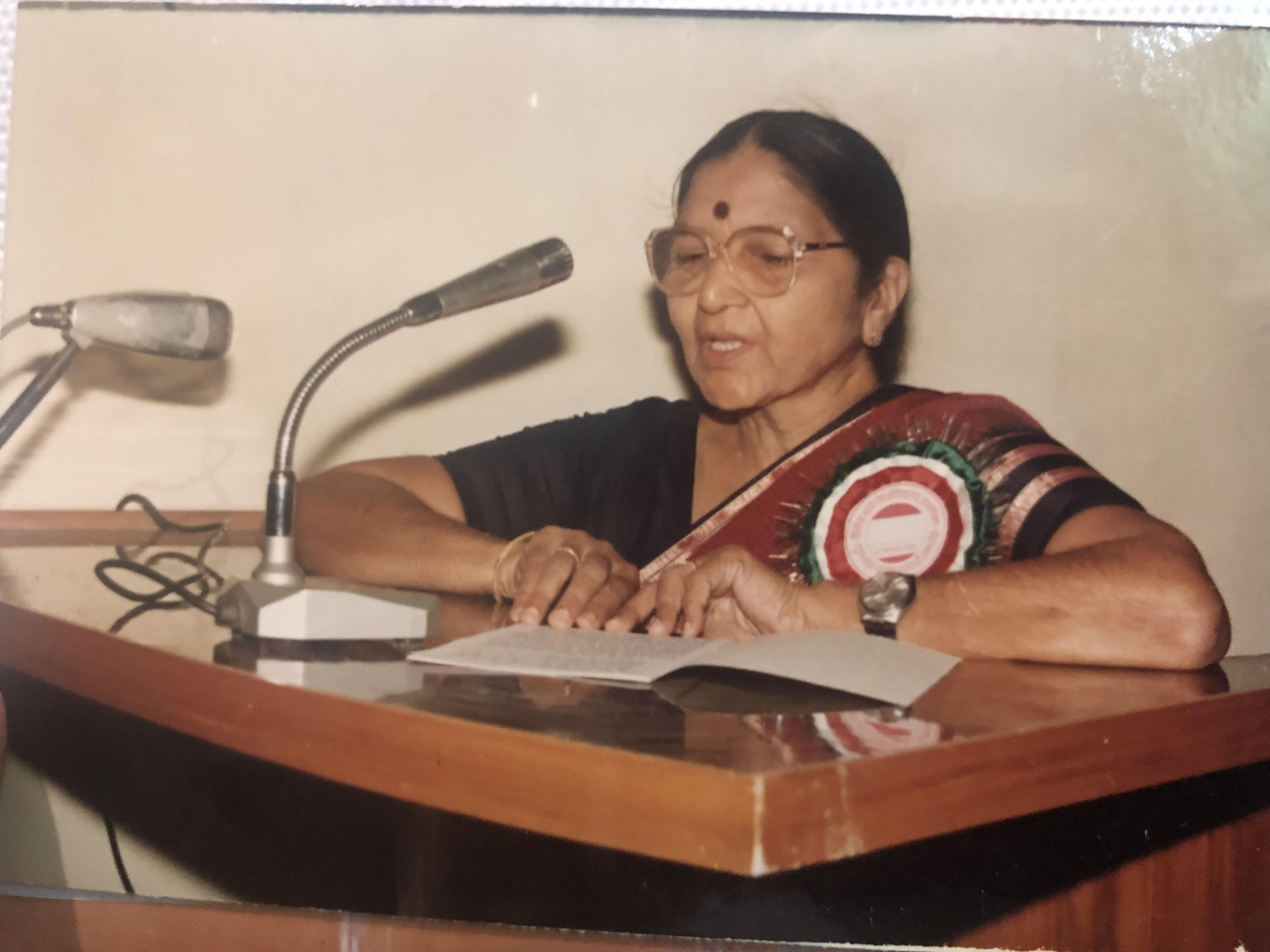

Vinodini Tarway (1931 – 16 March 2002) was a female Indian academic, born in the heritage city of Gaya, Bihar.

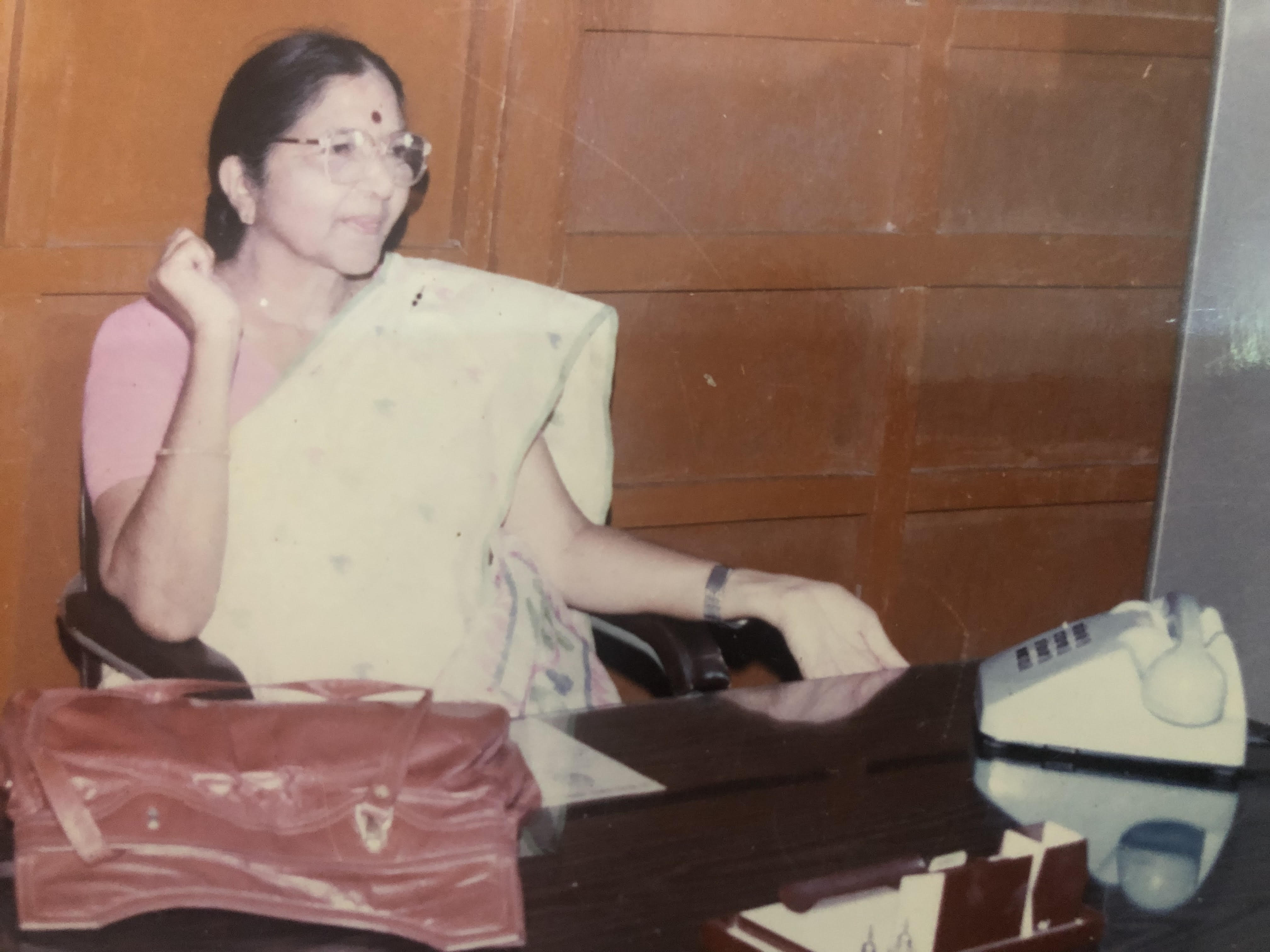

== Early life and education ==
She completed her school final examinations at Kanya Pathasala, the only school in Gaya in the early 1930s and 1940s to provide education to girls. At that time it was not customary for a girl, particularly in a small town like Gaya, to continue education beyond high school level. However, with the support of her father, Umacharan Tarway, a school teacher turned businessman, Tarway continued her study and obtained a degree from Banaras Hindu University, Varanasi.

== Career ==
After her graduation, Terway started as a teacher at her alma mater, Kanya Pathshala. She continued to pursue studies and obtained a post-graduation degree in political science from Magadh University, Gaya. This enabled her to progress to a series of jobs as lecturer and, later, principal at various women's colleges. These included colleges in Chaibasa, Ranchi and Dhanbad, all located in Jharkhand state (at that time part of Bihar state). While working as a lecturer in various colleges, she obtained a Ph.D. in political science from Patna University. A revised version of her thesis, East India Company and Russia (1800-1857), was published by Chand in 1977.

On 22 September 1992, she was appointed first vice chancellor of the Vinoba Bhave University, Hazaribagh by the governor of Bihar. She was the first woman vice chancellor of any university in the states of Bihar and Jharkhand. She continued in the job until her retirement on 4 February 1996.
