= Bagodar-Saria subdivision =

- Subdivision
- Location in West Bengal, India Bagodar-Saria subdivision (India)
- Coordinates: 24.174361°N 85.891528°E
- Country: India
- State: Jharkhand
- District: Giridih
- Headquarters: Suriya

Government
  - Type: Representative democracy

Area
  - Total: 864.04 km^{2} (333.61 sq mi)

Population (2011)
  - Total: 476,713
  - Density: 551.73/km^{2} (1,429.0/sq mi)

Languages
  - Official: Hindi, Urdu
- Time zone: UTC+5:30 (IST)
- Website: giridih.nic.in

Bagodar-Saria subdivision is an administrative subdivision of the Giridih district in the state of Jharkhand, India.Bagodar- Saria subdivision's population is in between 600,000 and 700,000 by 2026

== Subdivisions ==
Giridih district is divided into the following administrative subdivisions:

Subdivision	Headquarters	Area km^{2} (2001)	Population (2011)	Rural population % (2011)	Urban population % (2011)
Bagodar-Saria	Suriya	864.04	476,613	96.02	3.98
Dumri	Dumri	820.15	335,521	95.23	4.77
Giridih Sadar	Giridih	1148.64	700,855	93.17	6.83
Khori Mahuwa	Khori Mahua	2020.73	932,485	98.95	1.05

Cities, towns and locations in the Giridih district in North Chotanagpur Division
M: municipality, CT: census town, R: rural/ urban centre, H: historical/ religious/ tourist centre
Owing to space constraints in the small map, the actual locations in a larger map may vary slightly

== Police stations ==
Police stations in Bagodar-Saria subdivision have the following features and jurisdiction:

Police station	Area covered km^{2}	Municipal town	CD Block
Bagodar	n/a	-	Bagodar
Suriya	n/a	-	Suriya
Birni	n/a	-	Birni

== Blocks ==
Community development blocks in Bagodar-Saria subdivision are:

CD Block	Headquarters	Area km^{2}	Population (2011)	SC %	ST %	Hindus %	Muslims %	Literacy rate %	Census Towns
Bagodar	Bagodar	350.70	158,094	10.35	2.40	82.11	17.54	64.43	-
Suriya	Suriya	193.40	149,068	12.14	2.92	85.35	14,32	66.25	Barki Saraiya
Birni	Birni	319.94	169,451	15.26	1.46	77.59	22.07	63.22	-

== Education ==
The table below presents a comprehensive picture of the education scenario in Giridih district, with data for the year 2013-14:

Subdivision	Primary School		Middle School		High School		Higher Secondary School		General College, Univ		Technical / Professional Instt		Non-formal Education	
Subdivision	Institution	Student	Institution	Student	Institution	Student	Institution	Student	Institution	Student	Institution	Student	Institution	Student
Bagodar-Saria	333	54,217	225	23,670	53	11,943	3	2,817	-	-	-	-	-	-
Dumri	342	43,033	209	18,561	27	8,901	4	6,673	-	-	-	-	-	-
Giridih Sadar	590	80,952	314	33,912	50	19,187	6	11,701	2	7098	5	447	-	-
Khori Mahuwa	905	133,026	508	49,979	73	24,318	8	13,067	1	1,568	-	-	-	-
Giridih district	2,170	311,228	1,256	126,122	203	64,349	21	34,258	3	8,676	5	447	-	-

=== Educational institutions ===
The following institutions are located in Bagodar-Saria subdivision:

- Sariya College was established at Suriya in 1984. It is affiliated with Vinoba Bhave University and offers courses in arts and commerce.
- Ram Krishna Vivekananda College of Education was established at Bagodar in 2009. Affiliated to Vinoba Bhave University, it offers courses in arts, science, commerce and education.
