= Dhanwar, Giridih =

Dhanwar Rajdhanwar
- City/Municipality
- Location in Jharkhand, India Dhanwar (India)
- Coordinates: 24.42°N 85.98°E
- Country: India
- State: Jharkhand
- District: Giridih

Area
  - Total: 5 km^{2} (1.9 sq mi)

Population (2024)
  - Total: 26,000
  - Density: 5,200/km^{2} (13,000/sq mi)

Languages(*For language details see Dhanwar (community development block)#Language and religion)
  - Official: Hindi, Khortha
- Time zone: UTC+5:30 (IST)
- 06554: 825412
- Vehicle registration: JH-11
- Lok Sabha constituency: Kodarma
- Vidhan Sabha constituency: Dhanwar
- Website: giridih.nic.in

Rajdhanwar (khori mahua) is second largest subdivision in Jharkhand by area (2020.73km2) after porahat chakradharpur subdivision which is not a district.

'Dhanwar, also known as Rajdhanwar due to it being an erstwhile state under Maharaja Maheshwari prasad narayan deo,is a nagar panchayat in the Dhanwar CD block in the Khori Mahua subdivision of the Giridih district in the Indian state of Jharkhand. Khori mahua subdivision is located in Dhanwar. Rajdhanwar (Khori mahua) subdivision's population is in between 13 to 14 lakh which is ahead of bermo subdivision in jharkhand by 2026.Now in 2026 Khorimahua subdivision is largest subdivision in population by 2026 leaving behind bermo subdivision in subdivision population in jharkhand. This data is for subdivision not for district. The subdivision which is not a district. Dhanwar nagar panchayat is formed in 2019. It is a busiest business destination in the district Giridih. Dhanwar is surrounded by river from three sides. This town is very famous for Hindu festival Chhath puja in Jharkhand state. The Maharaja of dhanwar started chhath puja on this ghat which today is known as raj ghat. Each year, around 4 lakh people visit Dhanwar “Rajghat" during the festival. Decoration of Rajghat occurs at huge-level that fascinates the visitors.

== Geography ==
Cities, towns and locations in the Giridih district in North Chotanagpur Division
M: municipality, CT: census town, R: rural/ urban centre, H: historical/ religious/ tourist centre
Owing to space constraints in the small map, the actual locations in a larger map may vary slightly

=== Location ===
Dhanwar is located at 24.42°N 85.98°E. It has an average elevation of 336 m (1102 ft). The town has a check dam (used for agriculture) called "Naulakha Dam" and many people come here for picnics. Naulakha dam has boating facility. Under 4 month Zip line, Zip cycling, motorboat will be added in naulakha dam.One of its administrative subdivisions Khori Mahuwa comprises five blocks such as Rajdhanwar, Jamua, Gawan, Tisri, and Deori.

=== Area overview ===
Giridih district is a part of the Chota Nagpur Plateau, with rocky soil and extensive forests. Most of the rivers in the district flow from the west to east, except in the northern portion where the rivers flow north and north west. The Pareshnath Hill rises to a height of 4,479 feet (1,365 m). The district has coal and mica mines. It is an overwhelmingly rural district with small pockets of urbanisation.

Note: The map alongside presents some of the notable locations in the district. All places marked in the map are linked in the larger full screen map.

== Civic administration ==
=== Police station ===
Dhanwar police station has its jurisdiction over Dhanwar CD block. According to the British records, the police station was established after Giridh subdivision formation came into existence in 1870.

=== CD Block HQ ===
The headquarters of Dhanwar CD Block are located at Dhanwar.

== Demographics ==
According to the 2011 Census of India, Dhanwar had a total population of 15,200, of which 7,904 (52%) were males and 7,296 (48%) were females. Population in the age range 0–6 years was 1,253. The total number of literate persons in Dhanwar was 6,153 (81.78% of the population over 6 years).

As per 2001 India census, Dhanwar had a population of 7,935. Males constitute 51% of the population and females 49%. Dhanwar has an average literacy rate of 64%, higher than the national average of 59.5%. Male literacy is 73% while the female literacy is 55%. In Dhanwar, 16% of the population is under 6 years of age.

== Infrastructure ==
According to the District Census Handbook 2011, Giridih, Dhanwar covered an area of 5 km^{2}. Among the civic amenities, it had 14 km roads with both open and closed drains, the protected water supply involved tapwater from treated sources, uncovered well, overhead tank. It had 851 domestic electric connections, 55 road light points. Among the medical facilities, it had 1 hospital, 6 dispensaries, 6 health centres, 1 family welfare centre, 1 maternity and child welfare centre, 1 maternity home, 1 TB hospital/ clinic, 1 nursing home, 1 veterinary hospital, 10 medicine shops. Among the educational facilities it had 4 primary schools, 4 middle schools, 2 secondary schools, the nearest senior secondary school at Gangapur 5 km away, 1 general degree college. Among the social, cultural and recreational facilities, it had 1 cinema theatre. Three important commodities it produced were basketry, chura, sattu. It had the branch offices of 3 nationalised banks, 4 private bank,1 cooperative bank, 1 agricultural credit society.

== Economy ==
Rajhanwar is a basic level business place. It has become a huge marketplace with millions of daily transactions. The main contributions to its business are made through the sale of grains, Manihari goods, food products, cloth, jewelry, and metals.

Rajdhanwar is known for gold, silver ornaments and metal utensils. Electronic market is growing rapidly.

=== Banks ===
- State Bank of India
- Bank of India
- Bandhan Bank
- HDFC Bank
- ICICI Bank
- Axis Bank
- UCO Bank
- Ujjivan Small Finance Bank
- Jharkhand Rajya Gramin Bank
- Jharkhand State Co-operative Bank merged with IDBI Bank

Automated teller machines - BOI, SBI, Axis Bank ,HDFC, BANDHAN BANK, ICICI BANK,UCO BANK Various Customer service point(CSPs) (Mini bank)

== Transport ==
Dhanwar is on the Hazaribag - Deoghar (Bagodar-Khorimahua) State Highway. It is about 42 km from GT Road (NH 19). 29 Kms away from Grand Cord Railway Line (Hazaribag Road). Koderma (Jhumri Tilaiya) is 50 Kms from Rajdhanwar.

Railway

Rajdhanwar has a railway station named Dhanwar at about 3 km from the centre of town. There are only two superfast train on this route. Asansol hatia express (13513)and Delhi weekly express (14049). It is on the Madhupur-Giridih-Koderma line.

== Education ==
There are 6 affiliated cbse school and one postgraduate and 1 b.ed college in Rajdhanwar.

- Dr Bhabha public school (+2)
- K.d international school (+2)
- Bahadur Prasad Memorial public school (metric)
- Manthan valley school (+2)
- Kendriya vidyalaya dhanwar (+2)
- Delhi public school rajdhanwar (+2)
- Adarsh college rajdhanwar only pg college in Rajdhanwar
- Greet teacher training college

There are many good schools for Secondary & Senior Secondary education. S S High School Dhanwar is one of finest among them in Giridih District. Student of this school scores Bihar Topper (erstwhile Bihar). In Higher education With the efforts of local residents, Adarsh College was established at Rajdanwar in 1973, under the leadership of the former MLA & freedom fighter, Lt. Punit Roy on land donated by late Sureshwari prasad narayan deo freedom fighter and descendent of erstwhile royal family of dhanwar.It offers bachelor's courses in arts, science and commerce. A Teacher's Training College is also situated in Panchrukhi, Dhanwar.

== Culture ==
=== Temple ===
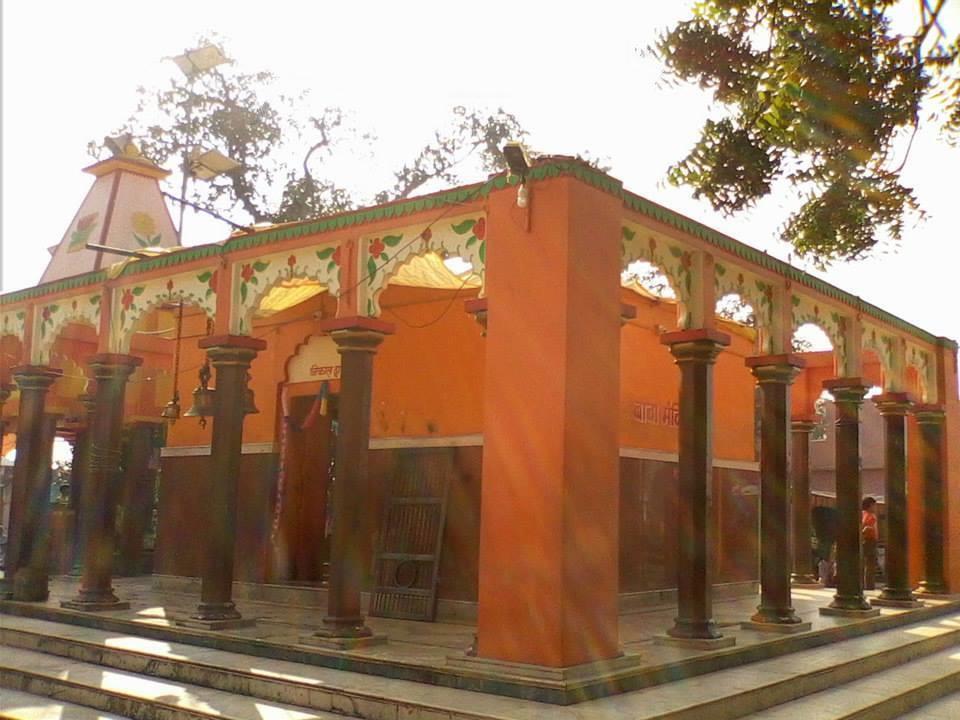
Jharkhand Dham a Lord Siva's Temple near Dhanwar, Giridih, Jharkhand

Jharkhand Dham - It is situated approximately 55 km from Giridih and 10 km from Rajdhanwar. "Jharkhand Dham" which is considered one of the second most worshipped temple of Shiva after Baidhnath Dham in Deoghar.

Raja Mandir and kali manda which was constructed by maharaja Maheswari prasad narayan deo near Raj ghat.

Gaytri Mandir, Ganesh Manadap and many others situated inside the Dhanwar market.

Hanuman Mandir- it is situated at Bada Chowk (cinema road) 3 km from Dhanwar station.

Shanidev Naugraha Mandir - It has recently built the only temple of Shani dev in the whole district. It is situated near the Rajghat.

Nawadih Mandap - It is situated at Ruputola Nawadih.

=== Chhat Puja ===
This town is very famous for Hindu festival Chhath puja in Jharkhand state. During chhath puja, around 4 lakh people visit Dhanwar chath ghat during the festival. The Maharaja of Dhanwar started Chatth puja at this ghat which later came to be known as raj ghat. Decoration of Rajghat occurs at huge-level that fascinates the visitors. Every single Road and street is filled with colourful lights, decorated, clean and full of devotion.

== Healthcare ==
- https://kiranvellorehospital.com

with 100 bedded (largest private hospital in dhanwar)

- Sanjeevani hospital
- Sarvmangala nursing hospital

Besides three, there are many hospital in dhanwar. SubDivisional Government hospital is under construction in dhanwar with an amount of 25 crore. Refral Hospital is the government Hospital situated in Block Campus, Gandhi Chowk. Normal operations are done here. Some Private nursing Homes are also situated here.

Ayurveda Centres

- Aarogya Vatika (Manihari Patty, Rajdhanwar) - specialises in arthritis, gastric and lung infection, blood pressure, and menstrual problems.

== See also ==
- Harihar Narayan Prabhakar
