= Bagodar =

- Village
- Location in Jharkhand, India Bagodar (India)
- Coordinates: 24.0803°N 85.8306°E
- Country: India
- State: Jharkhand
- District: Giridih
- Elevation: 308 m (1,010 ft)

Population (2011)
  - Total: 9,934

Languages (*For language details see Bagodar (community development block)#Language and religion)
  - Official: Hindi, khortha
- Time zone: UTC+5:30 (IST)
- PIN: 825322 (Bagodar)
- Telephone/ STD code: 06557
- Website: giridih.nic.in

Bagodar is a village in the Bagodar CD block in the Bagodar-Saria subdivision of the Giridih district in the Indian state of Jharkhand.

== Geography ==
Cities, towns and locations in the Giridih district in North Chotanagpur Division
M: municipality, CT: census town, R: rural/ urban centre, H: historical/ religious/ tourist centre
Owing to space constraints in the small map, the actual locations in a larger map may vary slightly

=== Location ===
Bagodar is located at 24.0803°N 85.8306°E.

=== Area overview ===
Giridih district is a part of the Chota Nagpur Plateau, with rocky soil and extensive forests. Most of the rivers in the district flow from the west to east, except in the northern portion where the rivers flow north and north west. The Pareshnath Hill rises to a height of 4,479 feet (1,365 m). The district has coal and mica mines. It is an overwhelmingly rural district with small pockets of urbanisation.

Note: The map alongside presents some of the notable locations in the district. All places marked in the map are linked in the larger full screen map.

== Demographics ==
According to the 2011 Census of India, Bagodar had a total population of 9,934, of which 5,124 (52%) were males and 4,810 (48%) were females. Population in the age range 0–6 years was 1,804. The total number of literate persons in Bagodar was 5,569 (68.50% of the population over 6 years).

== Civic administration ==
=== Police station ===
Bagodar police station has jurisdiction over the Bagodar CD block. According to old British records, Bagodar PS was opened in 1838, following the opening of the Grand Trunk Road.

=== CD Block HQ ===
The headquarters of the Bagodar CD block are located at Bagodar village.

== Transport ==
NH 19 (old numbering NH 2)/ Grand Trunk Road and the Hazaribagh town-Hazaribagh Road railway station road pass through Bagodar.

== Economy ==
Banks

- State Bank of India
- Bank of India
- Jharkhand Rajya Gramin Bank
- Co-operative Bank
- UCO Bank
- Punjab National Bank
- Allahabad Bank Aoura
- ESAF Small Finance Bank
- Axis Bank
- HDFC Bank
- Ujjivan Small Finance Bank
- ICICI Bank

== Education ==
- Ram Krishna Vivekananda College of Education was established at Bagodar in 2009. Affiliated to Vinoba Bhave University, it offers courses in arts, science, commerce and education.
- Govt Teachers Training College
- Green Valley Public school, Bagodar
- High School Bagodar
- Gyanodya Public School, Bagodar
- Children's Guide Academy School, Bagodar
- Primary Girls' School, Bagodar (Niche Bazaar)
- Govt. Basic School, Bagodar
- Girls' High School
- Beko High School (Gopald)
- Arun Kumar Memorial School Residential
- Model School
- Ghaghra Inter Science College
- Swami Dayanand Residential School Krishna Nagar, Bagodar
- J.C. Bose High School (Residential)
- St. Thomas Public School
- Gayatri Vidya Mandir
- Ram Krishna Vivekanand Vidyalaya
- Jharkhand Public School
- Sardar Ballabh Bhai Patel High School, Mahauri
- Manan Vidya, Mahuri, Bagodar
- Bhawna Edutech Tutorial, Block more, Bagodar
- Saraswati Vidya Niketan High School, Bagodar
- High School Hesla
- IDEAL PUBLIC SCHOOL

== Main colonies ==
- Suriya Road
- G.T Road, Sonturpi
- Mulla Muslim Mohalla
- Krishna Nagar
- Vivek Nagar
- Mahavir Nagar (Niche Bazaar, Bagodar)
- Ghaghra (Kasiyadih, Badkadih)
- Manjhaladih
- Atka (Laxibagi)
- Yamuna Nagar
- Hesla (Gendodih)
- Shiv Nagar
- Banpura
- Tirla (Aamtar)
- Mandhala Chowk NH-2,(G.T Road),
- KANDUTOLA NICHE BAZER BAGODAR

== Cricket clubs ==
- Kranti Club Jarmune
- Sonturpi Club
- Savera Sporting Club
- Mahavir Friends Club (Niche Bazar)
- Bagodardih Cricket Club
- Mahuri Cricket Club (G.T.Road)
- Ghaghra Cricket CLub (Kasiyadih)
- Five Star Club (Banpura)
- Tirla Cricket Club

== Temples ==
- Harihardham (Baba Dham)
- Sri Shakti Mandir (Bagodar)
- Vaishno Devi Mandir
- Banhe Baba Jarmune
- Durgamata Mandir (Atkadih, DMUAA)
- Mahavir Mandir (Niche Bazaar)
- Gupt Nath Dham
- Sai Mandir, Bagodar
- Surya Mandir, Hazaribag Road, Bagodar
- Vaishno Devi Mandir, Hazaribag Road, Bagodar
- Sona Pahad, Beko
- Khataya Hanumaan Mandir
- Kali Mandir Tirla
- Khataya Pahadi Mandir
