= Jamua Assembly constituency =

Constituency of the Jharkhand legislative assembly in India

Coordinates: 24.367°N 86.149°E

Jamua
- Constituency No. 30 for the Jharkhand Legislative Assembly

Constituency details
- Country: India
- Region: East India
- State: Jharkhand
- District: Giridih
- Lok Sabha constituency: Kodarma
- Established: 1951
- Total electors: 292,834
- Reservation: SC

Member of Legislative Assembly
- 5th Jharkhand Legislative Assembly
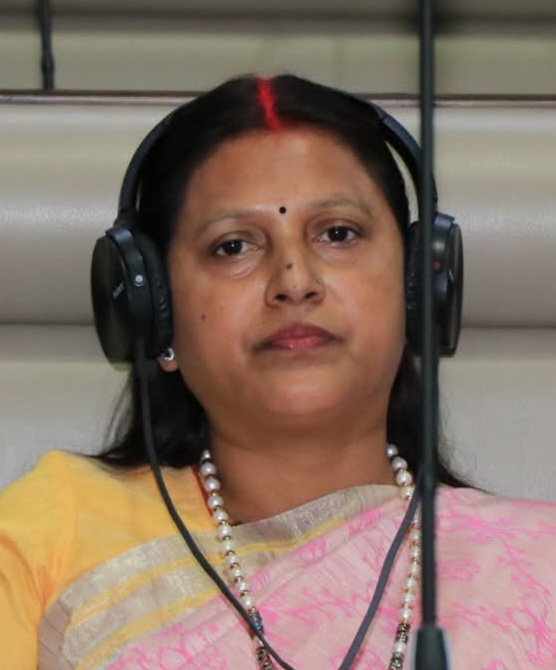
- Incumbent Manju Kumari
- Party: Bhartiya Janta Party
- Elected year: 2024

Jamua is an assembly constituency in the Indian state of Jharkhand.

== Members of the Legislative Assembly ==
Election	Member	Party
Bihar Legislative Assembly
Before 1957: see Jamua cum Gawan constituency
1957	Hari Prasad Sharma	Indian National Congress
1957	Bhola Manjhi	Communist Party of India
1962	Indra Narain Singh	Swatantra Party
1967	Sadanand Prasad	Indian National Congress
1969	Sadanand Prasad	Indian National Congress
1972	Ritlal Prasad Verma	Bharatiya Jana Sangh
1977	Shukar Rabidas	Janata Party
1980	Taneshwar Azad	Indian National Congress
1985	Baldeo Hazra	Communist Party of India
1990	Baldeo Hazra	Communist Party of India
1995	Sukar Rabidas	Bhartiya Janata Party
2000	Baldeo Hazra	Rashtriya Janata Dal
Jharkhand Legislative Assembly
2005	Kedar Hazra	Bharatiya Janata Party
2009	Chandrika Mahtha	Jharkhand Vikas Morcha
2014	Kedar Hazra	Bharatiya Janata Party
2019	Kedar Hazra	Bharatiya Janata Party
2024	Manju Kumari	Bharatiya Janata Party

== Election results ==
=== Assembly election 2024 ===
2024 Jharkhand Legislative Assembly election: Jamua
Party	Candidate	Votes	%	±%
BJP	Manju Kumari	117,532	53.40%	▲19.73
JMM	Kedar Hazra	84,901	38.58%	New
JLKM	Rohit Kumar Das	5,083	2.31%	New
Independent	Sanjay Das	2,476	1.13%	New
ASP(KR)	Gaurav Kumar	2,261	1.03%	New
Independent	Mahendra Rajak	1,403	0.64%	New
NOTA	None of the Above	5,033	2.29%	▼0.68
Margin of victory		32,631	14.83%	▲4.36
Turnout		2,20,077	61.25%	▲1.95
Registered electors		3,59,336		▲22.71
BJP hold		Swing	▲19.73	

=== Assembly election 2019 ===
2019 Jharkhand Legislative Assembly election: Jamua
Party	Candidate	Votes	%	±%
BJP	Kedar Hazra	58,468	33.67%	▼1.64
INC	Manju Kumari	40,293	23.21%	New
JVM(P)	Chandrika Mahtha	25,865	14.90%	▼5.86
CPI(ML)L	Ashok Paswan	15,921	9.17%	▼3.65
AJSU	Satya Narayan Das	9,668	5.57%	New
Independent	Pradip Ku Hajra	6,442	3.71%	New
Loktantrik Janshakti Party	Shyamdeo Hazra	2,433	1.40%	New
NOTA	None of the Above	5,149	2.97%	▲0.59
Margin of victory		18,175	10.47%	▼4.09
Turnout		1,73,627	59.29%	▲0.30
Registered electors		2,92,834		▲8.88
BJP hold		Swing	▼1.64	

=== Assembly election 2014 ===
2014 Jharkhand Legislative Assembly election: Jamua
Party	Candidate	Votes	%	±%
BJP	Kedar Hazra	56,027	35.32%	▲19.93
JVM(P)	Satya Narayan Das	32,927	20.75%	▼13.14
RJD	Baldeo Hazra	23,999	15.13%	▲2.21
CPI(ML)L	Ashok Paswan	20,339	12.82%	▼6.41
JMM	Chandrika Mahtha	11,791	7.43%	▲0.11
BSP	Govind Turi	3,163	1.99%	New
Jharkhand Vikas Dal	Manju Kumari	2,074	1.31%	New
NOTA	None of the Above	3,762	2.37%	New
Margin of victory		23,100	14.56%	▼0.10
Turnout		1,58,648	58.99%	▲3.65
Registered electors		2,68,949		▲17.79
BJP gain from JVM(P)		Swing	▲1.42	

=== Assembly election 2009 ===
2009 Jharkhand Legislative Assembly election: Jamua
Party	Candidate	Votes	%	±%
JVM(P)	Chandrika Mahtha	42,824	33.89%	New
CPI(ML)L	Satya Narayan Das	24,297	19.23%	▼0.26
BJP	Kedar Hazra	19,439	15.39%	▼20.96
RJD	Baldeo Hazra	16,316	12.91%	New
JMM	Arjun Baitha	9,255	7.33%	▼25.24
Independent	Sukar Ravidas	3,026	2.40%	New
AJSU	Kameshwar Paswan	1,954	1.55%	New
Margin of victory		18,527	14.66%	▲10.88
Turnout		1,26,346	55.34%	▼4.54
Registered electors		2,28,323		▲0.72
JVM(P) gain from BJP		Swing	▼2.45	

=== Assembly election 2005 ===
2005 Jharkhand Legislative Assembly election: Jamua
Party	Candidate	Votes	%	±%
BJP	Kedar Hazra	49,336	36.35%	▲12.94
JMM	Chandrika Mahtha	44,202	32.56%	▲28.83
CPI(ML)L	Satya Narayan Das	26,450	19.49%	New
Independent	Sukar Ravidas	3,839	2.83%	New
BSP	Nirmala Das	3,275	2.41%	New
Independent	Chhotu Turi	2,014	1.48%	New
LJP	Kameshwar Paswan	1,997	1.47%	New
Margin of victory		5,134	3.78%	▼23.48
Turnout		1,35,735	59.88%	▼2.35
Registered electors		2,26,691		▲17.47
BJP gain from RJD		Swing	▼14.32	

=== Assembly election 2000 ===
2000 Bihar Legislative Assembly election: Jamua
Party	Candidate	Votes	%	±%
RJD	Baldeo Hazra	60,838	50.66%	New
BJP	Sukar Ravidas	28,105	23.41%	New
INC	Sukar Pasi	15,443	12.86%	New
CPI	Satya Narayan Das	10,363	8.63%	New
JMM	Chhotu Turi	4,481	3.73%	New
Margin of victory		32,733	27.26%	
Turnout		1,20,079	62.99%	
Registered electors		1,92,983		
RJD win (new seat)				

== See also ==
- Giridih district
- List of constituencies of the Jharkhand Legislative Assembly
