= Jai Prakash Verma =

Indian politician

Jai Prakash Verma was a member of the Jharkhand Legislative Assembly from Gandey Assembly constituency.

He is a member of the Bharatiya Janata Party (BJP); he rejoined the BJP in 15 September 2024. He was a member of Jharkhand Mukti Morcha in 2023, however, he was suspended by the JMM during the 2024 general election when he contested as an independent candidate against JMM's ally CPI(ML)L's Vinod Kumar Singh in Koderma PC. Jai Prakash Verma's father, Jagdish Prasad Kushwaha, who was an Ayurved practitioner was considered as one of the tallest leader of Bhartiya Jana Sangh. Latter had played significant role in establishing Jana Sangh in United Bihar. He was the elder brother of Indian parliamentarian Rati Lal Prasad Verma. Verma is a nephew of Rati Lal Prasad Verma, the six time Member of Indian Parliament from Kodarma PC and a Rashtriya Swayamsevak Sangh veteran.
