= Laxman Swarnkar =

Indian politician

Member of Bihar Legislative Assembly
- In office 1977–1980
- Constituency: Gandey

Member of Bihar Legislative Assembly
- In office 1995–2000
- Preceded by: Salkhan Soren
- Constituency: Gandey

Personal details
- Party: Jharkhand Vikas Morcha
- Occupation: politician

Laxman Swarnkar is an Indian politician from Jharkhand. Swarnkar is a member of the Jharkhand Vikas Morcha. He is a member of the Jharkhand Legislative Assembly. He represented Gandey constituency in 1977 and 1995 as JP MLA and in 1995 as BJP MLA.

== See also ==
- Gandey Assembly constituency
- Jharkhand Legislative Assembly
