= Taratanr =

- Village
- Location in Jharkhand, India Taratanr (India)
- Coordinates: 24.051111°N 86.433545°E
- Country: India
- State: Jharkhand
- District: Giridih

Population (2011)
  - Total: 3,401

Languages(*For language details see Gandey block#Language and religion)
  - Official: Hindi, Urdu
- Time zone: UTC+5:30 (IST)
- Telephone/ STD code: 06532
- Lok Sabha constituency: Kodarma
- Vidhan Sabha constituency: Gandey
- Website: giridih.nic.in

Taratanr (also spelled Taratand) is a village in the Gandey CD block in Giridih Sadar subdivision of Giridih district in the Indian state of Jharkhand.

== Geography ==
Cities, towns and locations in the Giridih district in North Chotanagpur Division
M: municipality, CT: census town, R: rural/ urban centre, H: historical/ religious/ tourist centre
Owing to space constraints in the small map, the actual locations in a larger map may vary slightly

=== Location ===
Taratanr is located at 24.051111°N 86.433545°E.

=== Area overview ===
Giridih district is a part of the Chota Nagpur Plateau, with rocky soil and extensive forests. Most of the rivers in the district flow from the west to east, except in the northern portion where the rivers flow north and north west. The Pareshnath Hill rises to a height of 4,479 feet (1,365 m). The district has coal and mica mines. It is an overwhelmingly rural district with small pockets of urbanisation.

Note: The map alongside presents some of the notable locations in the district. All places marked in the map are linked in the larger full screen map.

== Demographics ==
According to the 2011 Census of India, Taratanr had a total population of 3,401, of which 1,757 (52%) were males and 1,644 (48%) were females. Population in the age range 0-6 years was 714. The total number of literate persons in Taratanr was 1,527 (56.83% of the population over 6 years).

== Civic administration ==
=== Police station ===
Taratanr police station has jurisdiction over the Gandey CD block.

== Transport ==
State Highway 13 (Jharkhand), running from Koderma to Gobindpur, passes through Taratanr. There is a bridge over the Barakar nearby, crossing over to Tundi CD block in Dhanbad district.
