= Gandey =

- Village
- Location in Jharkhand, India Gandey (India)
- Coordinates: 24.186111°N 86.438945°E
- Country: India
- State: Jharkhand
- District: Giridih

Population (2011)
  - Total: 2,798

Languages (*For language details see Gandey block#Language and religion)
  - Official: Hindi, Urdu
- Time zone: UTC+5:30 (IST)
- PIN: 815312 (Gandey)
- Telephone/ STD code: 06532
- Lok Sabha constituency: Kodarma
- Vidhan Sabha constituency: Gandey
- Website: giridih.nic.in

Gandey is a village in the Gandey CD block in the Giridih Sadar subdivision of the Giridih district in the Indian state of Jharkhand.

== Geography ==
Cities, towns and locations in the Giridih district in North Chotanagpur Division
M: municipality, CT: census town, R: rural/ urban centre, H: historical/ religious/ tourist centre
Owing to space constraints in the small map, the actual locations in a larger map may vary slightly

=== Location ===
Gandey is located at 24.186111°N 86.438945°E.

=== Area overview ===
Giridih district is a part of the Chota Nagpur Plateau, with rocky soil and extensive forests. Most of the rivers in the district flow from the west to east, except in the northern portion where the rivers flow north and north west. The Pareshnath Hill rises to a height of 4,479 feet (1,365 m). The district has coal and mica mines. It is an overwhelmingly rural district with small pockets of urbanisation.

Note: The map alongside presents some of the notable locations in the district. All places marked in the map are linked in the larger full screen map.

== Demographics ==
According to the 2011 Census of India, Gandey had a total population of 2,798, of which 1,460 (52%) were males and 1,338 (48%) were females. Population in the age range 0-6 years was 468. The total number of literate persons in Gandey was 1,824 (78.28% of the population over 6 years).

== Civic administration ==
=== Police station ===
Gandey police station has jurisdiction over the Gandey CD block. According to old British records, Gandey PS was there after Giridh subdivision was formed in 1870.

=== CD block HQ ===
The headquarters of the Gandey CD block are located at Gandey village.

== Transport ==
The Giridih-Margomunda Road passes through Gandey.

== Education ==
Jawahar Navodaya Vidyalaya was established in 1994 at Gandey. It is a co-educational residential school for children from class VI to class XII. These schools provide free high quality education plus ample extracurricular activities, boarding, lodging etc. for talented rural children. It has physics, chemistry biology and computer labs. Amongst the many sports facilities there is a 400m running track (international norm). Navodaya Vidyalaya Samiti, an autonomous body under the HRD Ministry, Government of India, manages these schools.
