= Gandey block =

Gandey Gānḍe
- Community Development Block
- Location in Giridih District
- Interactive map of Gandey
- Coordinates: 24°11′10″N 86°26′24″E
- Country: India
- State: Jharkhand
- District: Giridih
- Subdivision: Giridih Sadar
- Headquarters: Gandey
- Panchayat: 26 (8th)

Government
  - Type: Federal democracy
  - Block Development Officer: Nishant Ajum
  - Circle Officer: Md. Hussain

Area
  - Total: 366.09 km^{2} (141.35 sq mi)
  - Rank: 8th
- Elevation: 298 m (978 ft)

Population (2011)
  - Total: 175,087
  - Rank: 6th
  - Density: 478.26/km^{2} (1,238.7/sq mi)
  - Rank: 7th

Languages
  - Official: Hindi, Urdu
- Time zone: UTC+5:30 (IST)
- PIN: 812315 (Gandey)
- Telephone/STD code: 06532
- Vehicle registration: JH-11
- Lok Sabha constituency: Kodarma
- Vidhan Sabha constituency: Gandey
- Literacy: 56.30%
- Sex Ratio: 937
- Website: giridih.nic.in

Gandey block is a community development block (CD block) that forms an administrative division in the Giridih Sadar subdivision of the Giridih district in the Indian state of Jharkhand.

== Overview ==
Giridih is a plateau region. The western portion of the district is part of a larger central plateau. The rest of the district is a lower plateau, a flat table land with an elevation of about 1,300 feet. At the edges, the ghats drop to about 700 feet. The Pareshnath Hills or Shikharji rises to a height of 4,480 feet in the south-eastern part of the district. The district is thickly forested. Amongst the natural resources, it has coal and mica. Inaugurating the Pradhan Mantri Ujjwala Yojana in 2016, Raghubar Das, Chief Minister of Jharkhand, had indicated that there were 23 lakh BPL families in Jharkhand. There was a plan to bring the BPL proportion in the total population down to 35%.

== Maoist activities ==
Jharkhand is one of the states affected by Maoist activities. As of 2012, Giridih was one of the 14 highly affected districts in the state.As of 2016, Giridih was identified as one of the 13 focus areas by the state police to check Maoist activities. In 2017, the Moists, in Giridih district, have torched more than 50 vehicles engaged in road construction or carrying goods.

== Geography ==
Gandey is located at 24°11′10″N 86°26′24″E.

Gandey CD block is bounded by Bengabad CD block on the north, Margomunda CD block in Deoghar district and Narayanpur CD block in Jamtara district, on the east, Tundi CD block, in Dhanbad district, across the Barakar River, on the south and Giridih CD block on the west.

Gandey CD block has an area of 393.2 km^{2}. It has 26 gram panchayats, 266 inhabited villages. Gandey, Ahilyapur and Taratanr police stations serve this block. Headquarters of this CD block is at Gandey. 29.45% of the area has forest cover.

Rivers in Gandey CD block are Usri, Pichri, Barki and Jaithi.

Gram panchayats in Gandey CD block are: Badkitand, Jharghatta, Dasdih, Barmasiya 1, Fuljori, Ghatkul, Mednisare, Gandey, Udaypur, Champapur, Dokidih, Karribank, Barmasiya 2, Fulchi, Pandri, Taratand, Kunselwadah, Badkunda, Parwatpur, Ahiliyapur, Budhudih, Jamjori, Rasanjori, Gajkunda, Fuljhariya and Banki Kala.

== Demographics ==
=== Population ===
According to the 2011 Census of India, Gandey CD block had a total population of 175,087, all of which were rural. There were 90,407 (52%) males and 84,640 (48%) females. Population in the age range 0–6 years was 37,094. Scheduled Castes numbered 14,020 (8.01%) and Scheduled Tribes numbered 41,591 (23.75%).

=== Literacy ===
As of 2011 census the total number of literate persons in Gandey CD block was 77,685 (56.30% of the population over 6 years) out of which males numbered 49,994 (69.90% of the male population over 6 years) and females numbered 27,691 (41.66% of the female population over 6 years). The gender disparity (the difference between female and male literacy rates) was 28.24%.

As of 2011 census, literacy in Giridih district was 63.14% Literacy in Jharkhand was 66.41% in 2011. Literacy in India in 2011 was 74.04%.

See also – List of Jharkhand districts ranked by literacy rate

Literacy in CD Blocks of
Giridih district
Giridih subdivision
Giridih - 63.22%
Gandey - 56.30%
Bengabad - 59.33%
Dumri subdivision
Dumri - 63.55%
Pirtand - 47.22%
Bagodar Saria subdivision
Bagodar - 64.43%
Suriya - 66.25%
Birni - 61.47%
Khori Mahua subdivision
Dhanwar - 65.44%
Jamua - 63.99%
Deori - 62.54%
Tisri - 55.27%
Gawan - 60.94 %
Source: 2011 Census: CD Block Wise
Primary Census Abstract Data

=== Language and religion ===
Religions in Gandey CD block (2011)
Religion	Percent
Hinduism	55.67%
Islam	32.42%
Other*	10.61%
Christianity	1.01%
Other or not stated	0.29%
*mainly tribal religions like Sarna

Languages of Gandey CD block (2011)
1. Khortha (52.8%)
2. Santali (22.6%)
3. Urdu (18.6%)
4. Hindi (5.43%)
5. Others (0.62%)

Khortha is the main spoken language. Hindi is the official language. Urdu and Santali are also spoken.

== Rural poverty ==
40-50% of the population of Giridih district were in the BPL category in 2004–2005, being in the same category as Godda, Koderma and Hazaribagh districts. Rural poverty in Jharkhand declined from 66% in 1993–94 to 46% in 2004–05. In 2011, it has come down to 39.1%.

== Economy ==
=== Livelihood ===
Livelihood
in Gandey CD block
1. Cultivators (25.0%)
2. Agricultural labourers (52.9%)
3. Household industries (2.76%)
4. Other Workers (19.3%)

In Gandey CD block in 2011, amongst the class of total workers, cultivators numbered 17,656 and formed 24.96%, agricultural labourers numbered 37,447 and formed 52.93%, household industry workers numbered 1,955 and formed 2.76% and other workers numbered 13,684 and formed 19.34%. Total workers numbered 70,742 and formed 40.40% of the total population, and non-workers numbered 104,345 and formed 59.60% of the population.

Note: In the census records a person is considered a cultivator, if the person is engaged in cultivation/ supervision of land owned. When a person who works on another person's land for wages in cash or kind or share, is regarded as an agricultural labourer. Household industry is defined as an industry conducted by one or more members of the family within the household or village, and one that does not qualify for registration as a factory under the Factories Act. Other workers are persons engaged in some economic activity other than cultivators, agricultural labourers and household workers. It includes factory, mining, plantation, transport and office workers, those engaged in business and commerce, teachers, entertainment artistes and so on.

=== Infrastructure ===
There are 266 inhabited villages in Gandey CD block. In 2011, 143 villages had power supply. 1 village had tap water (treated/ untreated), 260 villages had well water (covered/ uncovered), 260 villages had hand pumps, and all villages had drinking water facility. 25 villages had post offices, 8 villages had a sub post office, 17 villages had telephones (land lines) and 179 villages had mobile phone coverage. 263 villages had pucca (paved) village roads, 47 villages had bus service (public/ private), 22 villages had autos/ modified autos, and 57 villages had tractors. 23 villages had bank branches, 11 villages had agricultural credit societies, 2 villages had cinema/ video halls, 7 villages had public library and public reading room. 77 villages had public distribution system, 29 villages had weekly haat (market) and 108 villages had assembly polling stations.

=== Agriculture ===
Hills occupy a large portion of Giridih district. The soil is generally rocky and sandy and that helps jungles and bushes to grow. The forest area, forming a large portion of total area, in the district is evenly distributed all over. Some areas near the rivers have alluvial soil. In Gandey CD block, the percentage of cultivable area to total area is 23.87%. The percentage of cultivable area to the total area for the district, as a whole, is 27.04%. Irrigation is inadequate. The percentage of irrigated area to cultivable area in Gandey CD block is 13.35%. May to October is the Kharif season, followed by the Rabi season. Rice, sown in 50% of the gross sown area, is the main crop in the district. Other important crops grown are: maize, wheat, sugar cane, pulses and vegetables.

=== Backward Regions Grant Fund ===
Giridih district is listed as a backward region and receives financial support from the Backward Regions Grant Fund. The fund created by the Government of India is designed to redress regional imbalances in development. As of 2012, 272 districts across the country were listed under this scheme. The list includes 21 districts of Jharkhand.

== Education ==
Gande CD block had 105 villages with pre-primary schools, 215 villages with primary schools, 78 villages with middle schools, 7 villages with secondary schools, 2 villages with senior secondary schools, 47 villages with no educational facility.
.*Senior secondary schools are also known as Inter colleges in Jharkhand

- Jawahar Navodaya Vidyalaya was established in 1994 at Gandey. It is a co-educational residential school for children from class VI to class XII. These schools provide free high quality education plus ample extra-curricular activities, boarding, lodging etc. for talented rural children. Navodaya Vidyalaya Samiti, an autonomous body under the HRD Ministry, Government of India, manages these schools.

- Green Garden Public School established in 2020 is one of a kind privately owned CBSE based English medium school providing education from Nursery to Class X. It is largest privately owned school in Gandey block of district Giridih.

== Healthcare ==
Gande CD block had 1 village with community health centre, 2 villages with primary health centres, 7 villages with primary health subcentres, 2 villages with allopathic hospitals, 5 villages with veterinary hospitals, 1 village with family welfare centre, 12 villages with medicine shops.
.*Private medical practitioners, alternative medicine etc. not included
