= Satgawan =

- Village
- Location in Jharkhand, India Satgawan (India)
- Coordinates: 24.7465°N 85.7695°E
- Country: India
- State: Jharkhand
- District: Koderma

Population (2011)
  - Total: 372

Languages (*For language details see Satgawan (community development block)#Language and religion)
  - Official: Hindi, Urdu
- Time zone: UTC+5:30 (IST)
- PIN: 825132
- Telephone/ STD code: 06556
- Vehicle registration: JH 12
- Lok Sabha constituency: Kodarma
- Vidhan Sabha constituency: Kodarma
- Website: koderma.nic.in

Satgawan is a village in the Satgawan CD block in the Koderma subdivision of the Koderma district in the Indian state of Jharkhand.

== Geography ==
Cities, towns and locations in Koderma district in North Chotanagpur Division
M: municipality, CT: census town, R: rural/ urban centre, D: dam, P: power plant, T: tourist centre
Owing to space constraints in the small map, the actual locations in a larger map may vary slightly

=== Location ===
Satgawan is located at 24.7465°N 85.7695°E.

Satgawan is not shown as a separate place in 2011 census. In the map of Satgawan CD block in the District Census Handbook, Koderma, it is not possible to identify the headquarters of the CD block. In the Google map of the area both Satgawan police station and Satgawan block office are shown in Baiddih.

=== Overview ===
Koderma district is plateau territory and around 60% of the total area is covered with forests. The first dam of the Damodar Valley Corporation, at Tilaiya, was built across the Barakar River and inaugurated in 1953. Koderma Junction railway station has emerged as an important railway centre in the region. It is a predominantly rural district with only 19.72% urban population.

Note: The map alongside presents some of the notable locations in the district. All places marked in the map are linked in the larger full screen map.

== Demographics ==
According to the 2011 Census of India, Baidih had a total population of 372, of which 186 (50%) were males and 186 (50%) were females. Population in the age range 0–6 years was 91. The total number of literate persons in Baiddih was 124 (44.13% of the population over 6 years).

== Civic administration ==
=== Police station ===
Satgawan police station serves Satgawan CD block.

=== CD block HQ ===
Headquarters of Satgawan CD block is at Satgawan village.
