= Raj Kumar Yadav (politician) =

Indian politician

Member of Jharkhand Legislative Assembly
- In office 2014–2019
- Preceded by: Ravindra Kumar Rai
- Succeeded by: Babulal Marandi
- Constituency: Dhanwar

Jharkhand state committee member of CPIML(L)
- Incumbent
- Assumed office 1996

Personal details
- Born: Vishniteacher, Giridih, Jharkhand, India
- Party: Communist Party of India (Marxist–Leninist) Liberation
- Education: 10th pass matric pass from Bihar School Examination Board, Patna in 1986
- Occupation: Agriculturist; Social Worker
- Profession: Politician

Raj Kumar Yadav (born 1971) is an Indian politician from Jharkhand. He was elected from Dhanwar Assembly constituency representing Communist Party of India (Marxist–Leninist) Liberation in the 2014 Jharkhand Legislative Assembly election.

== Early life and education ==
Yadav is from Vishniteacher, Dhanwar, Giridih District, Jharkhand. He is the son of Pritam Mehta. He passed Class 10 in 1986 and later discontinued his education.

== Career ==
Yadav first contested as an MLA in the 2005 Jharkhand Legislative Assembly election but lost to Ravindra Kumar Ray of BJP by a narrow margin of 3,334 votes. Later, he also contested the 2019 Jharkhand Legislative Assembly election but lost to former chief minister of Jharkhand Babulal Marandi. However, he won the 2014 Jharkhand Legislative Assembly election representing CPI (Marxist Leninist) Liberation.
