= Jagdish Prasad Kushwaha =

Indian Ayurveda practitioner and politician

Jagdish Prasad Kushwaha was an Ayurveda practitioner and politician from Jharkhand, India. He was a leader of Bharatiya Jana Sangh, considered as one of the early leaders of Sangh, who played significant role in establishing it in Kodarma Lok Sabha constituency and Giridih region in unified Bihar. Jagdish Prasad Kushwaha was elected as Pramukh of Jamua Bloc in Jharkhand for multiple terms and assumed this position until his death in 1999. He was the elder brother of Rati Lal Prasad Verma, six term Member of Indian Parliament from Kodarma Lok Sabha constituency and father of Jharkhand Legislative Assembly member, Jai Prakash Verma.
