= Annpurna Devi =

Indian politician (born 1970)

Annapurna Devi
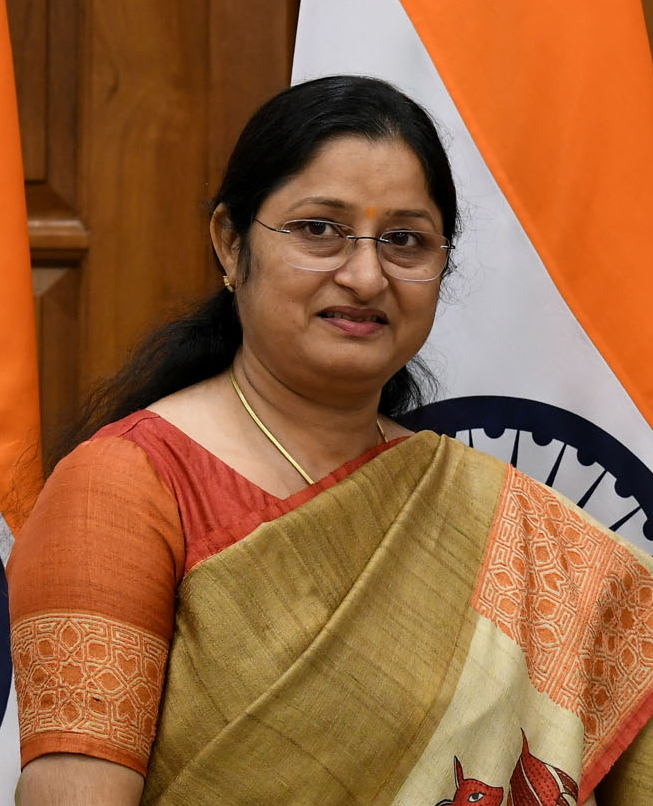
- Official portrait, 2021

Union Minister of Women & Child Development
- Incumbent
- Assumed office 10 June 2024
- President: Droupadi Murmu
- Prime Minister: Narendra Modi
- Preceded by: Smriti Zubin Irani

Union Minister of State for Education
- In office 7 July 2021 – 10 June 2024
- Prime Minister: Narendra Modi
- Minister: Dharmendra Pradhan
- Preceded by: Sanjay Shamrao Dhotre
- Succeeded by: Sukanta Majumdar; Jayant Chaudhary

Member of Parliament, Lok Sabha
- Incumbent
- Assumed office 23 May 2019
- Preceded by: Ravindra Kumar Ray
- Constituency: Kodarma, Jharkhand

Member of Jharkhand Legislative Assembly
- In office 1998–2014
- Preceded by: Ramesh Prasad Yadav
- Succeeded by: Neera Yadav
- Constituency: Kodarma

Personal details
- Born: 2 February 1970 (age 56) Ajmeri, Bihar, India (present-day Jharkhand)
- Party: Bharatiya Janata Party
- Other political affiliations: Rashtriya Janata Dal
- Spouse: Ramesh Prasad Yadav (m. 1993; died 1998)
- Children: 3
- Education: Ranchi University (PG)

Annapurna Devi Yadav (born 2 February 1970; Hindi pronunciation: [ən̪ːəpuːɾɳaː d̪eːʋiː jaːd̪əʋ]) is an Indian politician who is serving as the 5th Minister of Women and Child Development since 2024. She is also a Member of Parliament in Lok Sabha from Kodarma, Jharkhand in which she won the 2019 Indian general election as member of the Bharatiya Janata Party. She is also one of the National Vice Presidents of BJP. Previously, she was elected to the Jharkhand Legislative Assembly, from Kodarma (Vidhan Sabha constituency) as a member of the Rashtriya Janata Dal.

Devi became a union minister in PM Modi's cabinet, she won the Lok Sabha Election 2024 from Kodarma constituency of Jharkhand.

Union minister (Positions held): Annpurna Devi has held various significant positions throughout her political career. Since 10 June 2024, she has been serving as the Union Cabinet Minister of Women and Child Development. She was elected to the 18th Lok Sabha in June 2024. From 7 July 2021, she has served as the Union Minister of State for Education. Additionally, she is a Member of the Consultative Committee for the Ministry of Power and Ministry of New and Renewable Energy.

Previously, she was a Member of the Committee on Empowerment of Women (9 October 2019 - 7 July 2021) and a Member of the Standing Committee on Industry (13 September 2019 - 7 July 2021). In May 2019, she was elected to the 17th Lok Sabha.

At the state level, she served as the Cabinet Minister for the Ministry of Irrigation, Women & Child Welfare, and Registration in the Government of Jharkhand (2012 - 2014). From 2005 to 2009, she chaired the Committee on Women & Child Welfare in the Jharkhand Legislative Assembly and served as a Member of the Jharkhand Legislative Assembly for two terms (2005 - 2014). Earlier, she was the Minister of State for the Ministry of Mines and Geology, Government of Bihar, in 2000 and a Member of the Bihar/Jharkhand Legislative Assembly from 2000 to 2005 and the Bihar Legislative Assembly from 1998 to 2000.

== See also ==
- Third Modi ministry
