= Salkhan =

Salkhan may refer to:

- Salkhan Fossils Park
- Salkhan Murmu
- Salkhan Soren
- Sal Khan
