= Nizamuddin Ansari =

Member of the Jharkhand Legislative Assembly
- In office 2009–2013
- Preceded by: Ravindra Kumar Rai
- Succeeded by: Raj Kumar Yadav
- Constituency: Dhanwar

Personal details
- Party: Jharkhand Mukti Morcha
- Occupation: Politician

Nizamuddin Ansari is an Indian politician from Jharkhand. He won the Dhanwar seat in Giridih district in 2009 and sat in the Jharkhand Legislative Assembly as a member of the Jharkhand Vikas Morcha (Prajatantrik) (JVM(P)). Ansari later joined the Jharkhand Mukti Morcha (JMM). He stood from Dhanwar for that party in 2019 and 2024 and lost both times.

== Political career ==
=== Early political career ===
The Jharkhand Mukti Morcha picked Ansari as its Dhanwar candidate in January 2005. He was on the party's central committee at the time. The choice came ahead of the 2005 assembly election.

=== 2009 assembly election and legislative tenure ===
Ansari won Dhanwar in the 2009 election on a JVM(P) ticket. He polled 50,392 votes. Raj Kumar Yadav of the Communist Party of India (Marxist–Leninist) Liberation came second with 45,419, which put the margin at 4,973.

In March 2011, Ansari was one of several legislators who brought up the state of the roads in the assembly.

=== Return to Jharkhand Mukti Morcha ===
Ansari quit JVM(P) in 2014 and went back to the JMM. The party listed him in its first batch of candidates for the 2014 assembly election. His Dhanwar nomination was then rejected. The conviction made him ineligible to contest under the Representation of the People Act, 1951.

=== Subsequent elections ===
Ansari fought Dhanwar again for the JMM in the 2019 election and received 14,432 votes. Babulal Marandi of JVM(P) took the seat.

The JMM nominated him once more in the 2024 election. His rivals in Dhanwar included Marandi, who contested for the Bharatiya Janata Party (BJP), Raj Kumar Yadav of CPI(ML) Liberation, and the independent Niranjan Rai. Marandi won with 106,296 votes against Ansari's 70,858, a margin of 35,438.

== Electoral history ==
Year	Constituency	Party	Votes	Result
2009	Dhanwar	JVM(P)	50,392	Elected
2019	Dhanwar	JMM	14,432	Defeated
2024	Dhanwar	JMM	70,858	Defeated
