= Ramesh Prasad Yadav (Indian politician) =

Indian politician

Member of Bihar Legislative Assembly
- In office 1995–1998
- Preceded by: Rajendra Nath Dawn
- Succeeded by: Annapurna Devi Yadav
- Constituency: Kodarma

Personal details
- Born: Ramesh Prasad Yadav Vill. Kariyabar, P.O. Karma, P.S. & Distt. Koderma-825409, Jharkhand
- Died: 1998 Koderma, Bihar (Now in Jharkhand)
- Party: Janata Dal; Rashtriya Janata Dal
- Relatives: Annapurna Devi Yadav (Wife)
- Profession: Politician social worker

Ramesh Prasad Yadav was an Indian politician. He was elected to the Bihar Legislative Assembly from Kodarma as the 1990 Member of Bihar Legislative Assembly as a member of the Janata Dal. Yadav was elected twice from this assembly in 1995.
