= Mumtaz Ansari =

Indian politician

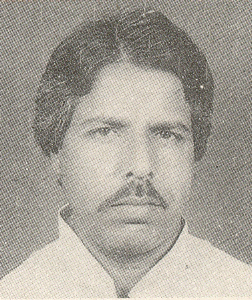

Member of Parliament, Lok Sabha
- In office 1991–1996
- Preceded by: R.L.P. Verma
- Succeeded by: R.L.P. Verma
- Constituency: Kodarma

Personal details
- Born: 26 September 1947 Daud Nagar, Aurangabad, Bihar (presently Jharkhand)
- Party: Janata Dal
- Spouse: 2 wives 1st Fatima Khatoon 2nd sultana khatoon
- Children: 4 sons and 4 daughters from 1st wife and 1 son and 2 daughters from 2nd wife.

Mumtaz Ansari is an Indian politician. He was a Member of Parliament, representing Kodarma in the Lok Sabha, the lower house of India's Parliament, as a member of the Janata Dal.
