= Kalpana Soren =

Indian politician (born 1985)

Kalpana Murmu Soren
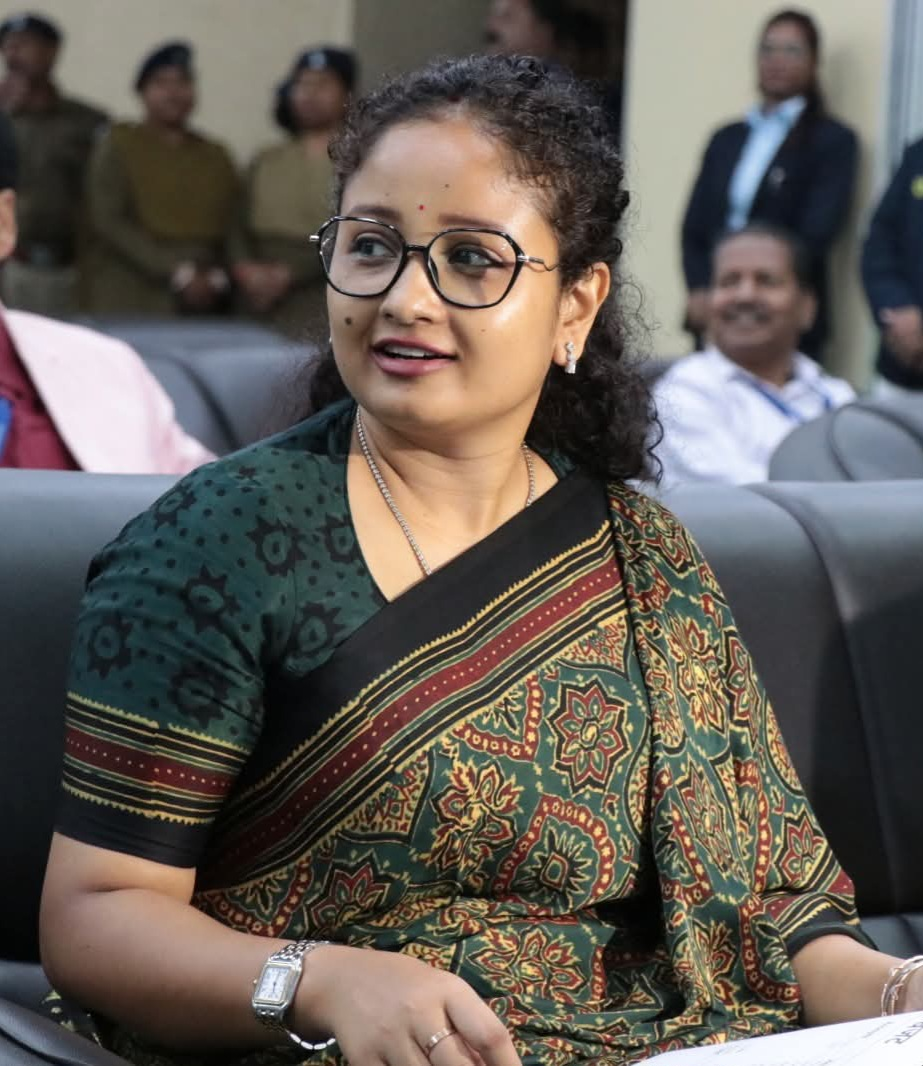
- Soren in 2025

Member of the Jharkhand Legislative Assembly
- Incumbent
- Assumed office 4 June 2024
- Preceded by: Sarfaraz Ahmad
- Constituency: Gandey

President Jharkhand Mahila Morcha
- Incumbent
- Assumed office 2024
- Preceded by: Mahua Maji

Personal details
- Born: Kalpana Murmu; 3 March 1985 (age 41) Kapurthala, Punjab, India
- Party: Jharkhand Mukti Morcha
- Spouse: Hemant Soren (m. 2006)
- Relations: Shibu Soren (father-in-Law)
- Children: 2
- Education: B.Tech.; MBA
- Alma mater: Koustuv Institute of Self-domain (under BPUT University, Odisha)
- Occupation: Businessperson; social activist; politician

Kalpana Soren (born 3 March 1985) is an Indian politician from the state of Jharkhand. She had won the Gandey constituency bypoll for MLA which was held in 2024. Soren is wife of Jharkhand Chief Minister Hemant Soren.

== Political career ==
Kalpana Murmu Soren, joined politics 4 March 2024, following her husband Hemant Soren's arrest by the Enforcement Directorate (ED) on 31 January. She has actively worked for the Jharkhand Mukti Morcha political campaign on 2024 General election. She is up against Bharatiya Janata Party candidate Dilip Kumar Varma and its alliance partner All Jharkhand Students Union is also canvassing support for the BJP candidate.

== Personal life ==
Kalpana Soren (née Murmu) was born on 3 March 1985, into a Santal family in Kapurthala, Punjab, where her father, Ampa Murmu, was stationed with the Indian Army. Her father's native place is Mayurbhanj district, Odisha. Due to her father's postings, she lived in various states and attended several Kendriya Vidyalaya schools. She completed her B.Tech in Electrical engineering from Koustuv Institute of Self-Domain (Biju Patnaik University of Technology, Odisha). On 7 February 2006, she married Hemant Soren, son of former Chief Minister Shibu Soren of Jharkhand. In 2012, she earned her MBA degree from Symbiosis Centre for Distance Learning, Pune. She is fluent in Odia, English, Hindi, Bengali and Santali.

She is the President of Sona Sobharam Memorial Society, and Director of Sohrai Livestock Pvt Ltd & Others.

== Electoral history ==
=== Jharkhand Legislative Assembly elections ===
Year	Constituency	Party	Votes	%	Result
2024^	Gandey	JMM	109,827	50.54	Won
2024	Gandey	JMM	119,372	50.51	Won

^by-election
