= Mahendar Prasad Singh =

Indian communist (1949–2005)

Member of Bihar Legislative Assembly
- In office 1990–2000
- Constituency: Bagodar

Member of Jharkhand Legislative Assembly
- In office 2000–2005
- Constituency: Bagodar

Politburo member of CPIML Liberation
- In office 1982–2005

Jharkhand state Secretary of CPIML Liberation
- In office 2000–2005

Personal details
- Born: 23 August 1949 Khambhra, Bihar
- Died: 16 January 2005 (aged 55) Bagodar, Jharkhand
- Party: CPIML Liberation
- Spouse: Shanti Singh
- Children: Vinod Kumar Singh
- Profession: Politician

Mahendar Prasad Singh (Hindi: महेंद्र प्रसाद सिंह); (23 August 1949 – 16 January 2005) popularly known as Mahendar Singh was an Indian communist politician and guerrilla leader. Mahendar Singh was a three-time elected legislative assembly member from Bagodar, in the state of Bihar, later the state of Jharkhand, as a member of CPIML Liberation.

Though Mahendar Prasad Singh began his career as an anti-electoralist guerrilla leader of Lal Sena, he later retracted those views and was elected to the Bihar Assembly. Seemingly due to his electoralist turn, he was shot and killed in Bagodar by Maoist fighters on 16 January 2005. At the time of legislative election he was campaigning for the fourth term when he was killed.
