= Rati Lal Prasad Verma =

Indian politician (1938-2004)

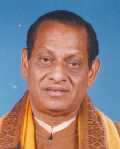

Member of Parliament, Loksabha
- In office 1998–1999
- Preceded by: Mumtaz Ansari
- Succeeded by: Tilakdhari Singh
- Constituency: Kodarma
- In office 1996–1998
- In office 1989–1991
- In office 1980–1984
- In office 1977–1980
- Constituency: Kodarma

Personal details
- Born: 1 February 1938
- Died: 15 January 2004 (aged 65)
- Party: Bharatiya Jana Sangh, Janata Party, BJP
- Spouse: Champa Devi Verma

R.L.P. Verma (1 February 1938 – 15 January 2004) was a former member of Lok Sabha and a leader of Bhartiya Janata Party. He was elected to Lok Sabha from Kodarma in Jharkhand state in India for six terms. Verma represented Jamua Assembly constituency once, from where he was elected in legislative assembly elections in 1972, on the ticket of Bhartiya Jana Sangh. However, on the call of Jai Prakash Narayan for Total Revolution, he resigned from his legislative assembly membership and became a part of the "Sampurna Kranti movement". He was made a candidate of Janata Party for Lok Sabha elections in 1977, and was subsequently elected to lower house of Indian Parliament. Verma has represented Kodarma Lok Sabha constituency for five terms, making him the longest serving Member of Parliament (MP) from this constituency. He was one of the two Member of Parliament of BJP during transformation of Jana Sangh into Bhartiya Janata Party. Verma played instrumental role in strengthening Bhartiya Jana Sangh and later Bhartiya Janata Party in Koderma.

== Biography ==
Verma was son of B.M Kushwaha, in an agrarian family belonging to Koeri caste. He studied at Patna University and later Ranchi University. A holder of Master of Arts and L.L.B degrees, he also got a diploma in public administration. Before working as full time politician, he was a professional lawyer. He took participation in 'Total Revolution' movement of Jayaprakash Narayan, during which, he was imprisoned for 19 month. He was also sent to jail thrice for agitation on Bangladesh issue. Verma was also associated with Trade Unionism and farmers' right movements. He was convenor of Bharat Sevak Samaj, an organisation based in Giridih. Verma was also associated with organisation called Farmers' Liberation Front and served as president of Mica Workers Trade Union between 1970 and 1975. He was also the president of Steel Workers Revolutionary Trade Union based in Bokaro.

Between 1968 and 1972, Verma worked as president of Bharatiya Jana Sangh (B.J.S.), for the district of Giridih in Jharkhand (then Bihar). He also served as Joint Secretary of Bihar wing of Bhartiya Jana Sangh, between 1969 and 1977. He was elected to Bihar Legislative Assembly for the first time during 1972–74. As a member of Indian Parliament, he has also served as member of various financial committees. Verma was first elected to Lok Sabha, the lower house of Indian Parliament in 1977. As a member of 6th Lok Sabha, he served as a Member of Committee on Estimates between 1978 and 1979. In 1980, he was again re-elected to 7th Lok Sabha for his second term. Between 1980 and 1982, he remained a member of Consultative Committee of Ministry of Railways. In the meantime, he was raised to the post of Secretary of Bharatiya Janata Party (B.J.P.), Bihar. As a member of BJP, he was re-elected to 9th Lok Sabha for his third term as Member of Parliament. Owing to his political height, he was made Mahamantri of Bihar wing of B.J.P between 1989 and 1991. Between 1990 and 1991, he remained a part of Committee of Privileges of parliament. In between 1993 and 1995, he was holding the post of vice-president, B.J.P for Bihar, and from 1995, Secretary of Bihar BJP. In 1996, he was re-elected to 11th Lok Sabha for his fourth term as MP. He was again re-elected to 12th Lok Sabha in 1998, making it his fifth term as MP. In the aftermath of this election, he again served as member of various committees of parliament.

In 1999, Verma threatened to leave BJP, as he was upset over the fact that an ordnance factory, which was about to be established in his constituency, was set up in constituency of George Fernandes.

During his last days in Bhartiya Janata Party, he was cornered by a rival group within the party. As a result of this, he left BJP and became a part of Jharkhand Mukti Morcha. He also played important role in Jharkhand movement. He died in 2004. In 2014, his son Pranav Verma also contested the Lok Sabha elections from Kodarma, but was defeated.

== Socio-cultural activities ==
He led establishment of a number of high schools and colleges in his constituency. It is reported that due to his efforts, Jharkhand got a railway line (294 - km. long) laid from Giridih to Ranchi via Hazaribagh town and Kodarma. Verma also played important role in bringing many irrigation projects and reservoir schemes in area. He also pitched for an ordnance factory, to be established in his constituency. He also set up water treatment plants, telephone kendras (telephone centres) and power houses in the region and provided assistance to drought-affected persons.

=== Books authored ===
He also took interest in literary pursuits; some of the books authored by him are:

(i) Goraksha Sandesh (A collection of poems);(ii) Madhyawadhi Chunav; Ek Shadyantra; (iii) Lav Kush Aikikaran; (iv) Laloo Tantra Banam Lok Tantra; (v) Satta Ki Chhina Jhapti; (vi) Dharam Nirpeksh Shaktiyoan Ka Sanyukta (Islami) Morcha; (vii)Vananchal; and (viii)Vananchal Prathak Rajya (both under print)(all in Hindi).

He was also the Chief Editor of weekly magazine Ekikaran Manch and monthly issue of Manch Prabha and Vyapar Pradarshak (all in Hindi). He composed several poems and contributed articles to the newspapers. Verma also produced a documentary film called Janata Yug in 1979.

== Personal life ==
Verma's brother, Jagdish Prasad Kushwaha, who was an Ayurved practitioner was considered as one of the tallest leader of Bhartiya Jana Sangh. Latter had played significant role in establishing Jana Sangh in United Bihar. Kushwaha's son, Jai Prakash Verma, who is the nephew of Rati Lal Prasad Verma was a former member of Jharkhand Legislative Assembly.

== See also ==
- Samrat Choudhary
- Laxmi Mahato Koiri
- Laxmi Narayan Mehta
