= Bagodar Assembly constituency =

Constituency of the Jharkhand legislative assembly in India

Coordinates: 24°5′0″N 85°52′0″E

Bagodar
- Constituency No. 29 for the Jharkhand Legislative Assembly

Constituency details
- Country: India
- Region: East India
- State: Jharkhand
- District: Giridih
- Lok Sabha constituency: Kodarma
- Established: 2000
- Total electors: 3,20,283
- Reservation: None

Member of Legislative Assembly
- 5th Jharkhand Legislative Assembly
- Incumbent Nagendra Mahto
- Party: BJP
- Elected year: 2024

Bagodar Assembly constituency is an assembly constituency in the Indian state of Jharkhand.

Bagodar assembly constituency is part of Kodarma (Lok Sabha constituency) and it covers Bagodar, Suriya and Birni Police Stations in Suriya-Bagodar sub-division.

== Members of the Legislative Assembly ==
Election	Member	Party
Bihar Legislative Assembly
1952	Kamakhya Narain Singh	Chota Nagpur Santhal Parganas Janata Party
1957	Vijay Raje	Chota Nagpur Santhal Parganas Janata Party
1962	Moti Ram	Swatantra Party
1967	L. R. Lakshmi	Jan Kranti Dal
1969	Basant Narain Singh	Janata Party
1972	Basant Narain Singh	Bharatiya Jana Sangh
1977	Gautam Sagar Rana	Janata Party
1980	Kharagdhari Narayan Singh	Independent politician
1985	Gautam Sagar Rana	Lok Dal
1990	Mahendar Prasad Singh	Indian Peoples Front
1995	Mahendar Prasad Singh	Communist Party of India (Marxist–Leninist) Liberation
2000	Mahendar Prasad Singh	Communist Party of India (Marxist–Leninist) Liberation
Jharkhand Legislative Assembly
2005	Vinod Kumar Singh	Communist Party of India (Marxist–Leninist) Liberation
2009	Vinod Kumar Singh	Communist Party of India (Marxist–Leninist) Liberation
2014	Nagendra Mahto	Bharatiya Janata Party
2019	Vinod Kumar Singh	Communist Party of India (Marxist–Leninist) Liberation
2024	Nagendra Mahto	Bharatiya Janata Party

== Election results ==
=== Assembly election 2024 ===
2024 Jharkhand Legislative Assembly election: Bagodar
Party	Candidate	Votes	%	±%
BJP	Nagendra Mahto	127,501	50.22%	▲10.90
CPI(ML)L	Vinod Kumar Singh	94,884	37.37%	▼8.78
JLKM	Md Salim	17,736	6.99%	New
NOTA	None of the Above	5,440	2.14%	▲0.28
Margin of victory		32,617	12.85%	▲6.01
Turnout		2,53,898	65.56%	▼0.88
Registered electors		3,87,283		▲20.92
BJP gain from CPI(ML)L		Swing	▲4.07	

=== Assembly election 2019 ===
2019 Jharkhand Legislative Assembly election: Bagodar
Party	Candidate	Votes	%	±%
CPI(ML)L	Vinod Kumar Singh	98,201	46.15%	▲9.43
BJP	Nagendra Mahto	83,656	39.31%	▲0.34
JVM(P)	Rajani Kaur	8,749	4.11%	▼4.64
AJSU	Anup Kumar Pandey	5,188	2.44%	New
Independent	Lalita Kumari	2,582	1.21%	New
Independent	Jagdish Mahto	2,316	1.09%	New
INC	Vasudev Pra Verma	2,049	0.96%	▼0.74
NOTA	None of the Above	3,953	1.86%	▲0.77
Margin of victory		14,545	6.84%	▲4.58
Turnout		2,12,795	66.44%	▼0.28
Registered electors		3,20,283		▲11.18
CPI(ML)L gain from BJP		Swing	▲7.18	

=== Assembly election 2014 ===
2014 Jharkhand Legislative Assembly election: Bagodar
Party	Candidate	Votes	%	±%
BJP	Nagendra Mahto	74,898	38.97%	▲34.42
CPI(ML)L	Vinod Kumar Singh	70,559	36.71%	▲0.16
JVM(P)	Mohammad Iqbal	16,823	8.75%	▼23.29
JMM	Chhotelal Prasad	7,222	3.76%	▼0.61
Independent	Nirmal Rana	4,026	2.09%	New
INC	Puja Chatterjee	3,281	1.71%	New
Awami Vikas Party	Md. Salim Akhtar	2,185	1.14%	New
NOTA	None of the Above	2,089	1.09%	New
Margin of victory		4,339	2.26%	▼2.25
Turnout		1,92,188	66.72%	▲6.97
Registered electors		2,88,070		▲15.57
BJP gain from CPI(ML)L		Swing	▲2.42	

=== Assembly election 2009 ===
2009 Jharkhand Legislative Assembly election: Bagodar
Party	Candidate	Votes	%	±%
CPI(ML)L	Vinod Kumar Singh	54,436	36.55%	▼11.41
JVM(P)	Nagendra Mahto	47,718	32.04%	New
RJD	Goutam Sagar Rana	13,499	9.06%	▲5.34
BJP	Nakul Pd. Mandal	6,784	4.56%	New
JMM	Satrudhan Pd. Mandal	6,505	4.37%	▼26.52
Independent	Abdul Mobin	4,385	2.94%	New
Independent	Mahesh Mishra	3,623	2.43%	New
Margin of victory		6,718	4.51%	▼12.57
Turnout		1,48,925	59.75%	▲0.24
Registered electors		2,49,264		▲3.48
CPI(ML)L hold		Swing	▼11.41	

=== Assembly election 2005 ===
2005 Jharkhand Legislative Assembly election: Bagodar
Party	Candidate	Votes	%	±%
CPI(ML)L	Binod Kumar Singh	68,752	47.97%	▲20.50
JMM	Nagendra Mahto	44,272	30.89%	▲13.00
JD(U)	Khargdhari Na. Singh	6,325	4.41%	▼17.38
RJD	Tulsi Prasad Yadav	5,334	3.72%	▼4.05
SS	Ashok Kumar Verma	5,045	3.52%	New
Independent	Anil Kumar	4,191	2.92%	New
BSP	Md. Imamul	3,495	2.44%	New
Margin of victory		24,480	17.08%	▲11.40
Turnout		1,43,333	59.50%	▲2.07
Registered electors		2,40,882		▲18.08
CPI(ML)L hold		Swing	▲20.50	

=== Assembly election 2000 ===
2000 Bihar Legislative Assembly election: Bagodar
Party	Candidate	Votes	%	±%
CPI(ML)L	Mahendar Prasad Singh	32,182	27.47%	New
JD(U)	Gautam Sagar Rana	25,529	21.79%	New
JMM	Nagendra Mahto	20,955	17.89%	New
Bhartiya Jana Congress (Rashtriya)	Kharagdhari Nr. Singh	15,692	13.39%	New
RJD	Jai Prakash Verma	9,105	7.77%	New
Independent	Rajesh Mandal	7,961	6.80%	New
INC	Deepak Maheshwari	4,040	3.45%	New
Margin of victory		6,653	5.68%	
Turnout		1,17,156	58.35%	
Registered electors		2,03,998		
CPI(ML)L win (new seat)				

== See also ==
- Vidhan Sabha
- List of states of India by type of legislature
