= Dhanwar Assembly constituency =

Constituency of the Jharkhand legislative assembly in India

Coordinates: 24.410°N 85.981°E

Dhanwar
- Constituency No. 28 for the Jharkhand Legislative Assembly

Constituency details
- Country: India
- Region: East India
- State: Jharkhand
- District: Giridih
- Lok Sabha constituency: Kodarma
- Established: 2000
- Total electors: 3,07,716

Member of Legislative Assembly
- 6th Jharkhand Legislative Assembly
- Incumbent Babulal Marandi
- Party: BJP
- Alliance: NDA
- Elected year: 2024
- Preceded by: Raj Kumar Yadav; CPI(ML)L

Dhanwar Assembly constituency is an assembly constituency in the Indian state of Jharkhand.

== Members of Legislative Assembly ==
Election	Member	Party
Bihar Legislative Assembly
1952	Punit Rai	Indian National Congress
1957-62: Constituency did not exist
1962	Gopal Rabidas	Swatantra Party
1967	Punit Rai	Indian National Congress
1969	Punit Rai	Indian National Congress
1972	Punit Rai	Indian National Congress
1977	Harihar Narayan Prabhakar	Janata Party
1980	Tilakdhari Prasad Singh	Indian National Congress
1985	Harihar Narayan Prabhakar	Bharatiya Janata Party
1990	Harihar Narayan Prabhakar	Indian National Congress
1995	Guru Sahay Mahto	Janata Dal
2000	Ravindra Kumar Rai	Bharatiya Janata Party
Jharkhand Legislative Assembly
2005	Ravindra Kumar Rai	Bharatiya Janata Party
2009	Nizamuddin Ansari	Jharkhand Vikas Morcha
2014	Raj Kumar Yadav	Communist Party of India (Marxist–Leninist) Liberation
2019	Babulal Marandi	Jharkhand Vikas Morcha
2024	Babulal Marandi	Bhartiya Janata Party

== Election results ==
=== Assembly election 2024 ===
2024 Jharkhand Legislative Assembly election: Dhanwar
Party	Candidate	Votes	%	±%
BJP	Babulal Marandi	106,296	45.35%	▲27.01
JMM	Nizam Uddin Ansari	70,858	30.23%	▲22.63
CPI(ML)L	Raj Kumar Yadav	32,187	13.73%	▼3.25
Independent	Brahmdev Tudoo	3,826	1.63%	New
Independent	Pawan Kumar Ram	3,021	1.29%	New
Independent	Bharat Yadav	2,320	0.99%	New
Independent	Manna Vinay Baske	1,910	0.81%	New
NOTA	None of the Above	1,312	0.56%	▼0.75
Margin of victory		35,438	15.12%	▲5.87
Turnout		2,34,416	63.18%	▲1.48
Registered electors		3,71,051		▲20.58
BJP gain from JVM(P)		Swing	▲17.77	

=== Assembly election 2019 ===
2019 Jharkhand Legislative Assembly election: Dhanwar
Party	Candidate	Votes	%	±%
JVM(P)	Babulal Marandi	52,352	27.58%	▲4.98
BJP	Lakshman Prasad Singh	34,802	18.33%	▲0.41
CPI(ML)L	Raj Kumar Yadav	32,245	16.99%	▼11.67
Independent	Anup Kumar Sonthalia	22,624	11.92%	New
AIMIM	Mohammad Danish	15,416	8.12%	New
JMM	Nijamuddin Ansari	14,432	7.60%	New
Independent	Tarkeshwar Gope	2,960	1.56%	New
NOTA	None of the Above	2,485	1.31%	▼1.31
Margin of victory		17,550	9.24%	▲3.18
Turnout		1,89,838	61.69%	▼1.95
Registered electors		3,07,716		▲10.84
JVM(P) gain from CPI(ML)L		Swing	▼1.08	

=== Assembly election 2014 ===
2014 Jharkhand Legislative Assembly election: Dhanwar
Party	Candidate	Votes	%	±%
CPI(ML)L	Raj Kumar Yadav	50,634	28.66%	▼2.52
JVM(P)	Babulal Marandi	39,922	22.59%	▼11.99
BJP	Lakshman Prasad Singh	31,659	17.92%	▼0.81
Independent	Mohammad Safik Ansari	28,701	16.24%	New
Jharkhand Vikas Dal	Uday Kumar Sinha	4,143	2.34%	New
INC	Upender Shingh	3,989	2.26%	New
Independent	Bandhan Ravidas	2,489	1.41%	New
NOTA	None of the Above	4,628	2.62%	New
Margin of victory		10,712	6.06%	▲2.65
Turnout		1,76,689	63.64%	▲2.09
Registered electors		2,77,622		▲17.28
CPI(ML)L gain from JVM(P)		Swing	▼5.93	

=== Assembly election 2009 ===
2009 Jharkhand Legislative Assembly election: Dhanwar
Party	Candidate	Votes	%	±%
JVM(P)	Nizamuddin Ansari	50,392	34.59%	New
CPI(ML)L	Raj Kumar Yadav	45,419	31.17%	▲3.80
BJP	Ravindra Kumar Ray	27,290	18.73%	▼10.98
JMM	Arjun Marandi	6,986	4.79%	▼22.39
BSP	Nejamaudin	3,867	2.65%	▲0.80
Independent	Rameshwar Prasad Yadav	3,486	2.39%	New
LJP	Manoj Yadav	2,502	1.72%	▼1.92
Margin of victory		4,973	3.41%	▲1.07
Turnout		1,45,703	61.55%	▼1.56
Registered electors		2,36,726		▲4.78
JVM(P) gain from BJP		Swing	▲4.88	

=== Assembly election 2005 ===
2005 Jharkhand Legislative Assembly election: Dhanwar
Party	Candidate	Votes	%	±%
BJP	Ravindra Kumar Ray	42,357	29.71%	▲4.11
CPI(ML)L	Raj Kumar Yadav	39,023	27.37%	▲3.90
JMM	Nizamuddin Ansari	38,754	27.18%	▲6.58
LJP	Harihar Narayan Prabhakar	5,192	3.64%	New
RJD	Bhagwat Prasad Yadav	3,441	2.41%	▼16.29
SP	Ram Kumar Raut	2,941	2.06%	▼1.33
BSP	Videshi Paswan	2,646	1.86%	New
Margin of victory		3,334	2.34%	▲0.21
Turnout		1,42,584	63.11%	▼3.77
Registered electors		2,25,924		▲13.29
BJP hold		Swing	▲4.11	

=== Assembly election 2000 ===
2000 Bihar Legislative Assembly election: Dhanwar
Party	Candidate	Votes	%	±%
BJP	Ravindra Kumar Ray	34,145	25.60%	New
CPI(ML)L	Raj Kumar Yadav	31,304	23.47%	New
JMM	Nijamuddin Ansari	27,480	20.60%	New
RJD	Guru Sahay Mahto	24,950	18.71%	New
INC	Arbind Choudhary	4,916	3.69%	New
SP	Dayanand Kumar Sao	4,519	3.39%	New
NCP	Umesh Yadav	3,343	2.51%	New
Margin of victory		2,841	2.13%	
Turnout		1,33,372	68.13%	
Registered electors		1,99,417		
BJP win (new seat)				

== See also ==
- Vidhan Sabha
- List of states of India by type of legislature
