= Nagendra Mahto =

Indian politician

Member of the Jharkhand Legislative Assembly

Nagendra Mahto (born 1951) is an Indian politician from Jharkhand. He is an MLA from Bagodar Assembly constituency in Giridih District. He won the 2024 Jharkhand Legislative Assembly election, representing the Bharatiya Janata Party.

== Early life and education ==
Mahto is from Bagodar, Giridih District, Jharkhand. He is the son of late Lakho Mahto. He completed his B.A. (B.T.) in 1984 at a college affiliated with Ranchi University, Ranchi.

== Career ==
Mahto won from Bagodar Assembly constituency representing Bharatiya Janata Party in the 2024 Jharkhand Legislative Assembly election. He polled 1,27,501 votes and defeated his nearest rival, Vinod Kumar Singh of the Communist Party of India (Marxist–Leninist) Liberation, by a margin of 32,617 votes. He first became an MLA winning the 2014 Jharkhand Legislative Assembly election defeating Vinod Kumar Singh of Communist Party of India (Marxist–Leninist) Liberation by a margin of 4,339 votes.
