= Salkhan Soren =

Indian politician

- Constituency: Gandey constituency

Member of the Legislative Assembly
- Incumbent
- Assumed office 1985

Personal details
- Died: 19 December 2016
- Political party: Jharkhand Mukti Morcha
- Occupation: Political activist, politician

Salkhan Soren was an Indian politician and a prominent leader in movement for separate state of Jharkhand. Soren was a member of the Jharkhand Mukti Morcha. Soren was a member of the Jharkhand Legislative Assembly from the Gandey constituency in Giridih district in 1985, 1990, 2000 and 2005. Soren died on 19 December 2016.

== Political career ==
Salkhan ran for the first time in the 1985 Bihar Legislative Assembly election from the Gandey Assembly constituency and emerged victorious. He subsequently ran from the same constituency in the 1990 Bihar Legislative Assembly election and won once again.

In the 2000 Bihar Legislative Assembly election, Salkhan ran as a Jharkhand Mukti Morcha candidate in the Gandey Assembly constituency. He received 35,375 votes and won a seat in the Legislative Assembly by defeating his closest competitor, Laxman Swarnkar of the Bharatiya Janata Party, with a margin of 8,918 votes. Salkhan served in this assembly from 2000 to 2005. In the 2005 Jharkhand Legislative Assembly election, Salkhan once again ran as a Jharkhand Mukti Morcha candidate in the Gandey Assembly constituency. He secured 36,849 votes and was re-elected to the Jharkhand Legislative Assembly, defeating Dr. Sarfaraz Ahmad of the Rashtriya Janata Dal by 1,512 votes. He continued to serve in this assembly from 2005 to 2010.
