= Kodarma Assembly constituency =

Constituency of the Jharkhand legislative assembly in India

Coordinates: 24.467°N 85.594°E

Kodarma
- Constituency No. 19 for the Jharkhand Legislative Assembly

Constituency details
- Country: India
- Region: East India
- State: Jharkhand
- District: Kodarma
- Lok Sabha constituency: Kodarma
- Established: 2000
- Total electors: 340202
- Reservation: None

Member of Legislative Assembly
- 5th Jharkhand Legislative Assembly
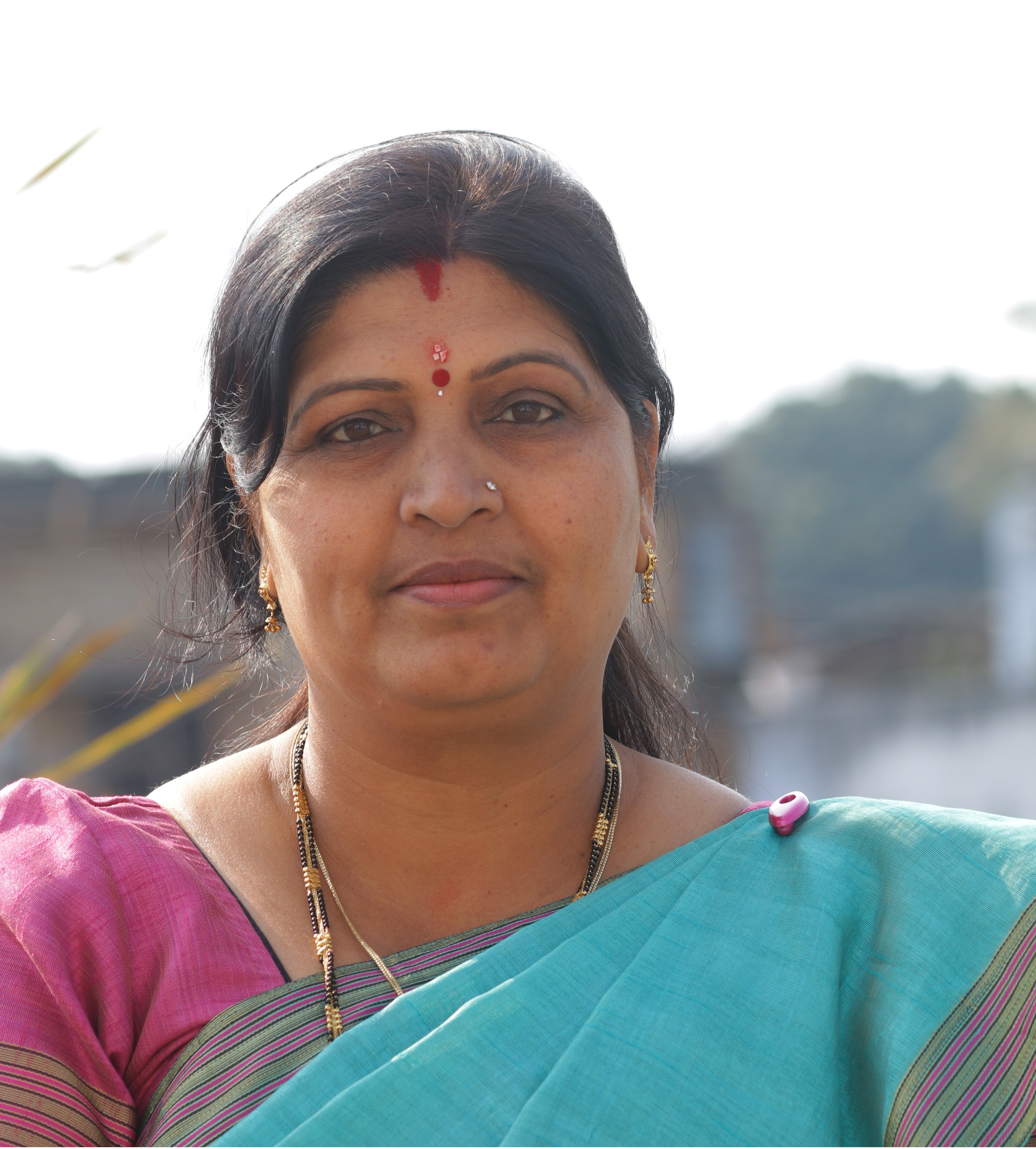
- Incumbent Neera Yadav
- Party: Bharatiya Janata party
- Elected year: 2024

Kodarma Assembly constituency is an assembly constituency in the Indian state of Jharkhand. It comes under Kodarma Lok Sabha constituency.

== Members of the Legislative Assembly ==
Year	Name	Party
Bihar Legislative Assembly
1952	Awadh Bihari Dikshit	Indian National Congress
1957	G. P. Tripathy	Chota Nagpur Santhal Parganas Janata Party
1962	Awadh Bihari Dikshit	Indian National Congress
1967	Biswanath Modi	Samyukta Socialist Party
1969	Biswanath Modi	Samyukta Socialist Party
1972	Rajendra Nath Dawan	Indian National Congress
1977	Biswanath Modi	Janata Party
1980	Rajendra Nath Dawan	Indian National Congress
1985	Rajendra Nath Dawan	Indian National Congress
1990	Ramesh Prasad Yadav	Janata Dal
1995	Ramesh Prasad Yadav	Janata Dal
2000	Annpurna Devi	Rashtriya Janata Dal
Jharkhand Legislative Assembly
2005	Annpurna Devi	Rashtriya Janata Dal
2009	Annpurna Devi	Rashtriya Janata Dal
2014	Dr. Neera Yadav	Bharatiya Janata Party
2019	Dr. Neera Yadav	Bharatiya Janata Party
2024	Dr. Neera Yadav	Bharatiya Janata Party

== Election results ==
=== Assembly Election 2024 ===
2024 Jharkhand Legislative Assembly election: Kodarma
Party	Candidate	Votes	%	±%
BJP	Dr. Neera Yadav	86,734	33.69%	▲2.34
RJD	Subhash Yadav	80,919	31.43%	▲0.97
Independent	Shalini Gupta	69,537	27.01%	New
BSP	Prakash Ambedkar	2,355	0.91%	▼0.87
Independent	Virendra Prasad Verma	2,201	0.85%	New
Independent	Sunil Ku Sinha	1,984	0.77%	New
Independent	Rajesh Raj	1,539	0.60%	New
NOTA	None of the Above	5,909	2.30%	▲1.54
Margin of victory		5,815	2.26%	▲1.37
Turnout		2,57,434	63.51%	▲3.81
Registered electors		4,05,318		▲19.14
BJP hold		Swing	▲2.34	

=== Assembly Election 2019 ===
2019 Jharkhand Legislative Assembly election: Kodarma
Party	Candidate	Votes	%	±%
BJP	Dr. Neera Yadav	63,675	31.35%	▼11.52
RJD	Amitabh Kumar	61,878	30.46%	▼5.58
AJSU	Shalini Gupta	45,014	22.16%	New
JVM(P)	Ramesh Harshdhar	9,557	4.71%	▼0.66
Independent	Yogendra Kumar Pandit	4,169	2.05%	New
BSP	Prakash Ambedkar	3,627	1.79%	New
Independent	Chandradev Yadav	2,449	1.21%	New
NOTA	Nota	1,536	0.76%	▼0.71
Margin of victory		1,797	0.88%	▼5.95
Turnout		2,03,121	59.71%	▼6.23
Registered electors		3,40,202		▲13.30
BJP hold		Swing	▼11.52	

=== Assembly Election 2014 ===
2014 Jharkhand Legislative Assembly election: Kodarma
Party	Candidate	Votes	%	±%
BJP	Dr. Neera Yadav	84,874	42.87%	▲24.10
RJD	Annpurna Devi	71,349	36.04%	▲4.19
JVM(P)	Bhim Sahu	10,629	5.37%	▼14.75
Independent	Sikander Dhobi	5,628	2.84%	New
SP	Gopal Yadav	3,947	1.99%	New
Independent	Mohammad Danish	3,874	1.96%	New
JMM	Ravindra Kumar Shandilya	2,898	1.46%	▼8.30
NOTA	None of the Above	2,911	1.47%	New
Margin of victory		13,525	6.83%	▼4.90
Turnout		1,97,978	65.93%	▲6.32
Registered electors		3,00,276		▲21.48
BJP gain from RJD		Swing	▲11.02	

=== Assembly Election 2009 ===
2009 Jharkhand Legislative Assembly election: Kodarma
Party	Candidate	Votes	%	±%
RJD	Annpurna Devi	46,922	31.85%	▲0.72
JVM(P)	Ramesh Singh	29,639	20.12%	New
BJP	Vijay Kumar Saw	27,654	18.77%	▲5.50
JMM	Mahesh Ray	14,393	9.77%	▲2.96
BSP	Sajid Hussain	13,377	9.08%	New
Independent	Sikandar Dhobi	3,673	2.49%	New
Independent	Sheonandan Kumar Sharma	2,062	1.40%	New
Margin of victory		17,283	11.73%	▼5.99
Turnout		1,47,339	59.61%	▼0.35
Registered electors		2,47,183		▼0.69
RJD hold		Swing	▲0.72	

=== Assembly Election 2005 ===
2005 Jharkhand Legislative Assembly election: Kodarma
Party	Candidate	Votes	%	±%
RJD	Annpurna Devi	46,452	31.12%	▼20.11
Independent	Sajid Hussain	19,998	13.40%	New
BJP	Lalsa Singh	19,805	13.27%	▼20.60
Independent	Ashok Kumar Panday	18,185	12.18%	New
Independent	Gopal Yadav	16,605	11.13%	New
JMM	Bheem Sahu	10,158	6.81%	New
CPI(ML)L	Ramdhan Yadav	2,933	1.97%	New
Margin of victory		26,454	17.72%	▲0.36
Turnout		1,49,251	59.96%	▼3.38
Registered electors		2,48,912		▲24.69
RJD hold		Swing	▼20.11	

=== Assembly Election 2000 ===
2000 Bihar Legislative Assembly election: Kodarma
Party	Candidate	Votes	%	±%
RJD	Annpurna Devi	64,790	51.24%	New
BJP	Ramesh Singh	42,828	33.87%	New
INC	Ram Lakhan Singh	4,987	3.94%	New
CPI	Krishna Singh	4,083	3.23%	New
Independent	Gopal Yadav	3,657	2.89%	New
Independent	Manindra Ram	1,791	1.42%	New
Independent	Rajendra Prasad	1,060	0.84%	New
Margin of victory		21,962	17.37%	
Turnout		1,26,455	64.34%	
Registered electors		1,99,625		
RJD win (new seat)				

== See also ==
- Vidhan Sabha
- List of states of India by type of legislature
