= Vinod Kumar Singh (Bagodar politician) =

Indian politician

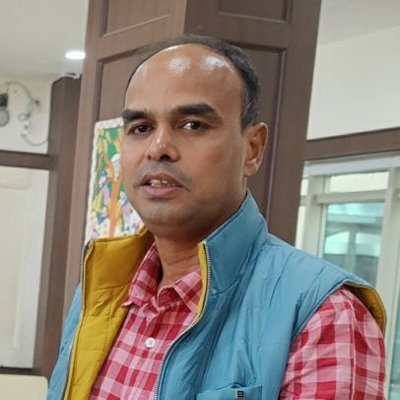

Member of the Jharkhand Legislative Assembly
- In office 23 December 2019 – 23 November 2024
- Preceded by: Nagendra Mahto
- Succeeded by: Nagendra Mahto
- Constituency: Bagodar constituency
- In office 27 February 2005 – 23 December 2014
- Preceded by: Mahendar Prasad Singh
- Succeeded by: Nagendra Mahto
- Constituency: Bagodar constituency

Personal details
- Party: Communist Party of India (Marxist-Leninist) Liberation
- Parent: Mahendar Prasad Singh (father)
- Education: Intermediate course, Patna BN College; Graduated in Sociology from Benaras Hindu University, Benaras Hindu University; Master of Sociology, Benaras Hindu University
- Profession: Politician

Vinod Kumar Singh is an Indian politician and member of the Communist Party of India (Marxist–Leninist) Liberation. Singh was a member of the Jharkhand Legislative Assembly from the Bagodar constituency in Giridih district in 2005, 2009 and 2019. Vinod Singh has passed his Matric from his hometown Bagodar. Later, he went to Patna B N College for his intermediate education. He graduated in Sociology from Benaras Hindu University, Varanasi and did master in sociology from same university. He had interest in films production, so he shifted to Mumbai for his passion but after untimely demise of his father Mahendra Singh, then MLA of Bagodar who was brutally murdered by goon, Vinod Singh had to return home and he elected in 2005 By election from Bagodar Assembly seat.
