= Neera Yadav (politician) =

Indian politician

Dr. Neera Yadav
- डॉ. नीरा यादव
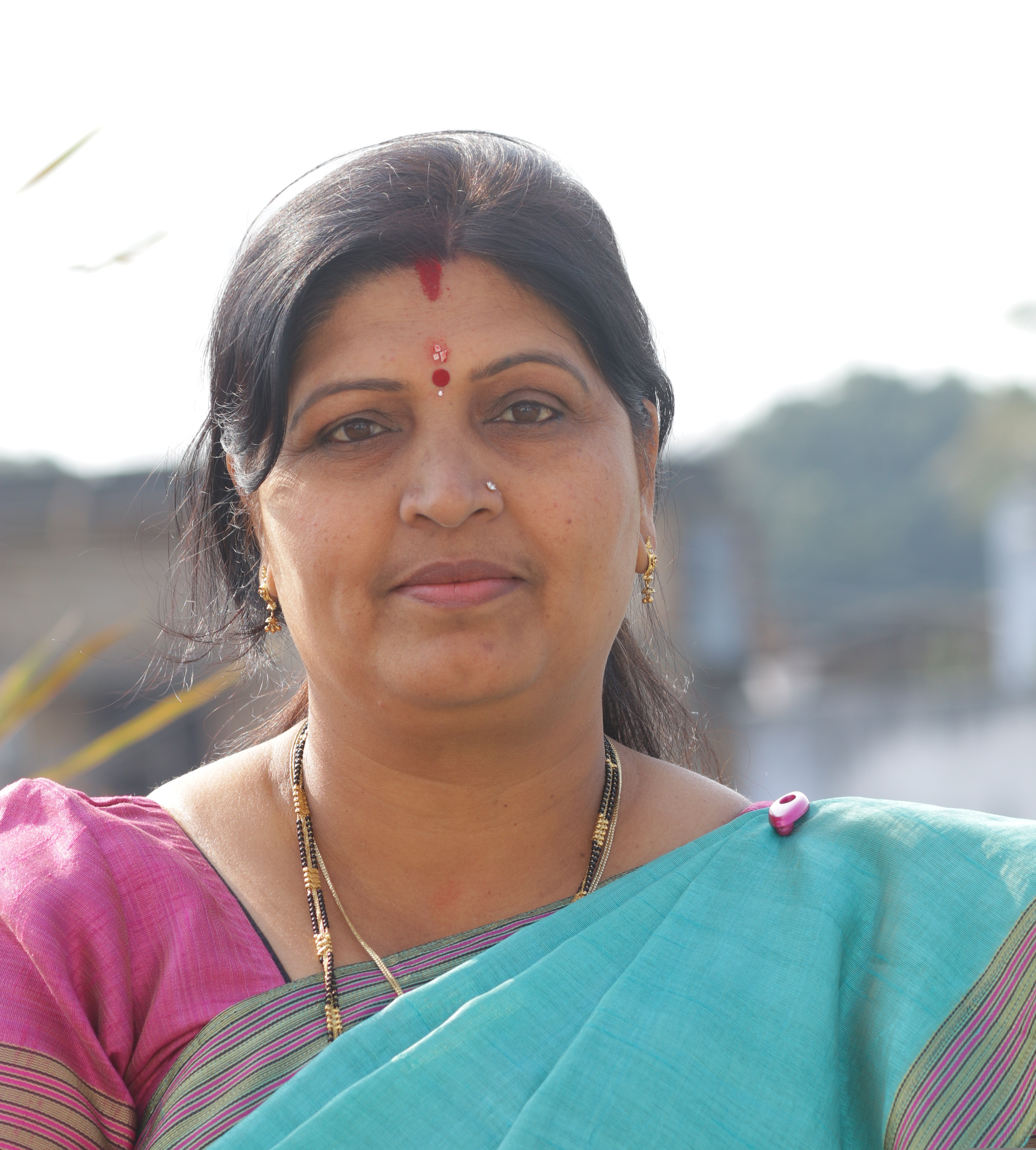

Minister of Human Resource Development of Government of Jharkhand
- In office 2014–2019

Personal details
- Born: Neera Yadav; 18 September 1971 (age 54) Jharkhand
- Occupation: Politician
- Known for: Politics

Dr. Neera Yadav is a leader of Bharatiya Janata Party Jharkhand. She was born on 18 September 1971. She is wife of Vijay Yadav. She is a member of Jharkhand Legislative Assembly from Kodarma (Vidhan Sabha constituency). She has a doctorate from Vinoba Bhave University. She completed M.Com. in 1996 and B.Ed. in 2009 from Ranchi University. She used to teach commerce at an intermediate college in Kodarma.

She has served as Minister of Human Resource Development of Jharkhand Government (2014–2019).
