= Sarfaraz Ahmad =

Indian politician

Member of Parliament, Rajya Sabha
- Incumbent
- Assumed office 4 May 2024
- Constituency: Jharkhand

Personal details
- Party: Jharkhand Mukti Morcha

Sarfaraz Ahmad is an Indian politician from Jharkhand. Ahmad is a member of the Jharkhand Mukti Morcha. He is a member of the Jharkhand Legislative Assembly. He represented Gandey constituency in 1980 and 2009 as INC MLA and in 2019 as JMM MLA. Dr. Sarfaraz Ahmed has been elected leader of JMM in parliamentary of Rajya Sabha. This decision was taken in the party parliamentary group meeting.

== Resignation ==
Resigned as Member of Jharkhand Legislative Assembly on 1 January 2024 due to personal reasons.
