= Ravindra Kumar Ray =

Indian politician

Member of parliament, Lok Sabha
- In office 16 May 2014 – 23 May 2019
- Preceded by: Babulal Marandi
- Succeeded by: Annapurna Devi Yadav
- Constituency: Kodarma

Personal details
- Born: 2 May 1958 (age 68) Margoda, Giridih, Jharkhand
- Party: Bharatiya Janata Party
- Spouse: Smt. Vidya Ray
- Children: 3
- Parent(s): Smt Krishna Devi & Shri Jainarayan Ray
- Education: St. Columba"s college. Ranchi College
- Occupation: Educationist
- As of 14 August, 2018

Ravindra Kumar Ray (born 2 May 1958; Hindi pronunciation: [ɾəʋɪn̪d̪ɾə kʊmaːɾ ɾaːj]) is an Indian politician and member of parliament from Koderma constituency, Jharkhand. He won in the Indian general election in 2014 as a Bharatiya Janata Party candidate. He was the Mines and Mineral minister of Jharkhand during Babu Lal Marandi’s government and later became the Cabinet minister of Industry and Labour during the Arjun Munda government. Ravindra Ray played an important role in the formation of Jharkhand and was the first person to propose the idea of having a CM of the MLA’s choice in the state. Working president of Jharkhand BJP

== Early and personal life ==
Ravindra Kumar Ray was born in the Baghochia family in Margoda Village of Giridih district. His father Shri Jai Narayan Rai was a Sarpanch of his Panchayat since Independence till 2005 and Panchayati Raj elections were held after 20 years in Bihar, which he did not contest.

Ray's grandfather Babu Nageshwar Rai, a close associate of Ramgarh Raj and Maharaj Kumar Dr Basant Narain Singh of Ramgarh and a member of Ramgarh Raj Swatantrata Party, was a member of legislative assembly of Bihar representing Dhanwar in 1957. He was also a member of Mining board Hazaribagh. Ray is married to Vidya Ray since 1983. They have two sons and a daughter.

He completed his high school from Bharkatta and later completed his graduation from St. Columba's College, Hazaribag. He further went on to complete his master's degree from Ranchi University and PhD in History on "Development of RSS with special reference to Chota-Nagpur" from Vinoba Bhave University.

He later joined Aadarsh College Rajdhanwar in Giridih District as a lecturer of history and continues to be in the service but on leave.

=== Political career ===
In 1975 during the emergency period Ravindra Ray joined RSS and was involved in underground operations. During this tenure he used to visit Hazaribagh, Barahi, Ramgarh, and Gola on his bicycle and used to exchange messages, plan and discuss strategies with the underground political activists of that period.

He became a part of ABVP in 1977 and officially joined BJP in the year 1984. In 1988 he became the General Secretary of Bharatiya Janta Yuva Morcha.

He unsuccessfully contested the Bihar legislative assembly election from Bagodar and Rajdhanwar in 1985 and 1990 respectively. Although he didn’t contest the 1995 assembly elections but he was given the responsibility of managing the elections of three assemblies which were Giridih, Jamua and Gandey and which BJP won.

Ray won his first election in the year 2000 from Rajdhanwar assembly constituency under Bihar Legislative Assembly. He was the first person who came to Ranchi and did press conference during the creation of Jharkhand as a separate state. He took oath as Mines and Minerals Minister with independent charge in Marandi’s Government and in the political circle it was said that Dr. Rai was the second-in-command of the then govt. During his incumbency as Minister of Mines and Minerals he brought in many changes in the Mining Policy of the state in which one of the major changes was the removal of Royalty from sand and still the government follows the same policy.

On 11 March 2003 when most of the ministers decided to topple Marandi’s government he was the man who stood up and sensing that the speaker was behind all this, he brought no-confidence motion against the speaker a first of its kind. Later on there was change in the leadership and Arjun Munda became the new Chief Minister of Jharkhand. He was instrumental in forming the Munda govt. He took oath as the cabinet minister of Labour and Industry. During his tenure he introduced single window policy in his department for the first of its kind in the state of Jharkhand.

He contested 2014 general election from Koderma constituency successfully and is also serving as a member of Coal and Steel committee along with his responsibility as an elected representative. He is seen as a vocal and active member of the parliament setting up a trend different from his predecessor.

In 2005 when Babulal Marandi quit BJP and founded Jharkhand Vikas Morcha he along with Bishnu Prasad Bhaiya (Very close companion of Marandi) went along with Marandi, and later on Bhaiya resigned from Jamtara constituency and Ray was disqualified under 10th schedule by the Court. He kept confidence with the higher authorities in the Sangh Parivar and the BJP and tried to persuade Marandi to get back into fold of the BJP till 2008.

Ultimately before 2009 elections when he realized that JVM will eventually get in Alliance with Congress/UPA, he came back to BJP and contested scheduled legislative assembly election from Rajdhanwar which he lost.

In 2011 he was trusted with the post of party presidency of Jharkhand. Under his command, BJP won 12 out of 14 seats in Jharkhand and also contested 2014 legislative elections successfully and formed the government on its own majority for the first time in Jharkhand.
