= Kodarma Lok Sabha constituency =

Lok Sabha constituency in Jharkhand

Coordinates: 24.467°N 85.594°E

Kodarma JH-5
- Lok Sabha constituency
- Interactive Map Outlining Kodarma Lok Sabha constituency

Constituency details
- Country: India
- Region: East India
- State: Jharkhand
- Assembly constituencies: Kodarma; Barkatha; Dhanwar; Bagodar; Jamua; Gandey
- Established: 1977
- Reservation: None

Member of Parliament
- 18th Lok Sabha
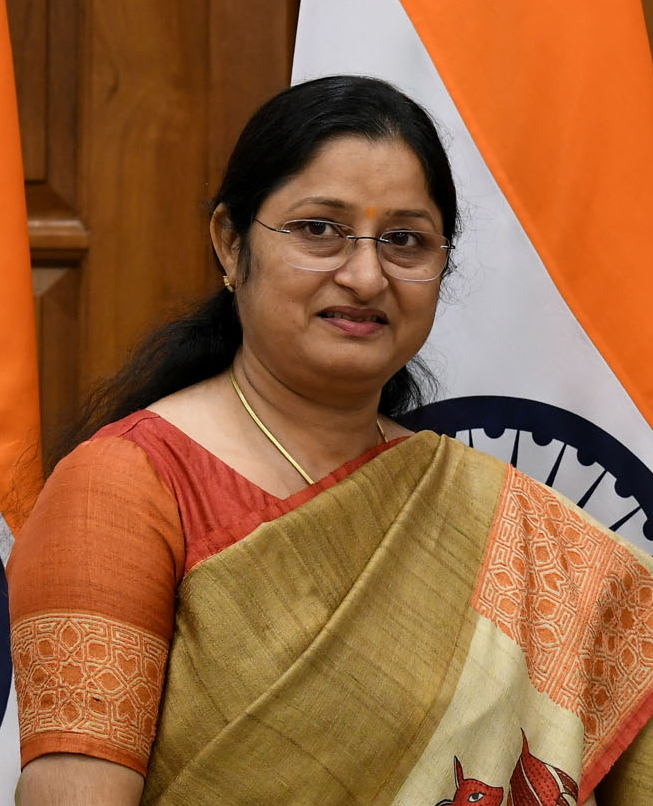
- Incumbent Annapurna Devi; Union Minister of Women and Child Development
- Party: BJP
- Alliance: NDA
- Elected year: 2024

Kodarma Lok Sabha constituency is one of the 14 Lok Sabha (parliamentary) constituencies in the state of Jharkhand in eastern India. This constituency covers the entire Koderma district and parts of the Hazaribagh and Giridih districts.

== Assembly segments ==
Presently, Kodarma Lok Sabha constituency comprises the following six Vidhan Sabha (legislative assembly) segments:

#	Name	District	Member	Party	2024 Lead
19	Kodarma	Koderma	Dr. Neera Yadav	BJP	BJP
20	Barkatha	Hazaribagh	Amit Kumar Yadav	BJP	BJP
28	Dhanwar	Giridih	Babulal Marandi	BJP	BJP
29	Bagodar	Giridih	Nagendra Mahto	BJP	BJP
30	Jamua (SC)	Giridih	Kalpana Soren	BJP	BJP
31	Gandey	Giridih	Manju Kumari	JMM	BJP

== Members of Parliament ==
Year	Member	Party
1952-77 : Constituency did not exist
1977	Rati Lal Prasad Verma	Janata Party
1980	Rati Lal Prasad Verma	Janata Party
1984	Tilakdhari Singh	Indian National Congress
1989	Rati Lal Prasad Verma	Bharatiya Janata Party
1991	Mumtaz Ansari	Janata Dal
1996	Rati Lal Prasad Verma	Bharatiya Janata Party
1998	Rati Lal Prasad Verma	Bharatiya Janata Party
1999	Tilakdhari Singh	Indian National Congress
2004	Babulal Marandi	Bharatiya Janata Party
2006^	Babulal Marandi	Independent
2009	Babulal Marandi	Jharkhand Vikas Morcha
2014	Ravindra Kumar Ray	Bharatiya Janata Party
2019	Annpurna Devi	Bharatiya Janata Party
2024	Annpurna Devi	Bharatiya Janata Party

== Election results ==
=== 2024 ===
2024 Indian general election: Kodarma
Party	Candidate	Votes	%	±%
BJP	Annpurna Devi	791,657	57.79	−4.60
CPI(ML)L	Vinod Kumar Singh	4,14,643	30.27	+24.67
NOTA	None of the above	42,152	3.08	
Independent	Manoj Yadav	28,962	2.09	
Majority		3,77,014	27.52	
Turnout		13,73,091	62.19	
BJP hold		Swing		

=== 2019 ===
2019 Indian general elections: Kodarma
Party	Candidate	Votes	%	±%
BJP	Annapurna Devi Yadav	753,016	62.26	
JVM(P)	Babulal Marandi	2,97,416	24.59	
CPI(ML)L	Raj Kumar Yadav	68,207	5.64	
AITC	Kanchan Kumari	14,119	1.17	
Majority		4,55,600	37.67	
Turnout		12,09,661	66.68	
BJP hold		Swing		

=== 2014 ===
2014 Indian general elections: Kodarma
Party	Candidate	Votes	%	±%
BJP	Ravindra Kumar Ray	365,410	35.65	
CPI(ML)L	Raj Kumar Yadav	2,66,756	26.03	
JVM(P)	Pranav Kumar Verma	1,60,638	15.67	
INC	Tilakdhari Pd Singh	60,330	5.89	
Majority		98,654	9.63	
Turnout		10,24,939	62.51	
BJP gain from JVM(P)		Swing		

=== 2009 ===
2009 Indian general election: Kodarma
Party	Candidate	Votes	%	±%
JVM(P)	Babulal Marandi	199,462	25.55	
CPI(ML)L	Raj Kumar Yadav	1,50,942	19.34	
BJP	Laxaman Sawarnkar	1,15,145	14.75	
RJD	Pranav Kumar Verma	1,10,574	14.17	
JMM	Bishnu Prasad Bhaiya	61,339	7.86	
INC	Tilakdhari Pd. Singh	49,478	6.34	
Others	Other 5 Party Candidates	44,728	5.73	
Independent	5 Independent Candidates	48,870	6.26	
Majority		48,520	6.21	
Turnout				
Swing to JVM(P) from CPI(ML)L		Swing		

=== 2006 by-election ===
2006 By-election: Kodarma
Party	Candidate	Votes	%	±%
Independent	Babu Lal Marandi	325,871	43.00	
INC	Manoj Kumar Yadav	1,31,731	17.38	
BJP	Pranav Kumar Verma	1,15,892	15.29	
CPI(ML)L	Raj Kumar Yadav	89,173	11.77	
SP	Asif Ali	16,716	2.21	
AJSU	Jai Prakash Verma	8,761	1.16	
Independent	8 Independent Candidates	69,640	9.19	
Majority		1,94,140	25.62	
Turnout				
Swing to Independent from INC		Swing		

=== 2004 ===
2004 Indian general election: Kodarma
Party	Candidate	Votes	%	±%
BJP	Babulal Marandi	366,656	44.40	
JMM	Champa Verma	2,11,712	25.64	
CPI(ML)L	Raj Kumar Yadav	1,36,554	16.54	
INC	Tilakdhari Prasad Singh	53,806	6.52	
BSP	Mahesh Ram	17,053	2.07	
Independent	Ram Balak Choudhary	14,129	1.71	
Independent	Deo Charan Das	9,215	1.12	
SP	Krishnadeo Yadav	5,731	0.69	
Jharkhand Party	Umesh Chandra Trivedi	5,540	0.67	
Independent	Yogendra Kumar Sinha	5,314	0.64	
Majority		1,54,944	18.76	
Turnout				
Swing to BJP from JMM		Swing		

=== 1999 ===
1999 Indian general election: Kodarma
Party	Candidate	Votes	%	±%
INC	Tilakdhari Prasad Singh	273,808	46.02	
BJP	Ritlal Prasad Verma	2,63,630	44.31	
CPI(ML)L	Nazmul Hasan	21,100	3.55	
NCP	Dr. Mumtaj Ansari	19,587	3.29	
JMM	Bhagwat Rana	9,037	1.52	
BSP	Aftab Ahmad	3,149	0.53	
JP	Samsad Ahmad	2,014	0.34	
Independent	Wakil Narayan	1,369	0.23	
Independent	Ramdeo Mahtha	1,303	0.22	
Majority		10,178	1.71	
Turnout		6,02,557	52.97	
Swing to INC from BJP		Swing		

=== 1998 ===
1998 Indian general election: Kodarma
Party	Candidate	Votes	%	±%
BJP	Ritlal Prasad Verma	280,635	42.06	▲2.62
RJD	Avid Hussain	1,82,724	27.39	New entry
INC	Tilakdhari Prasad Singh	1,22,478	18.36	▲7.14
JD	Gauttam Sagar Rana	47,116	7.06	▼24.77
CPI(ML)L	Mahandera Prasad Singh	29,831	4.47	▲1.36
Others	2 Other Party Candidates	4,384	0.66	N/A
Majority		97,911	14.67	▲7.06
Turnout		6,80,671	59.75	
Swing to BJP from RJD		Swing		

=== 1996 ===
1996 Indian general election: Kodarma
Party	Candidate	Votes	%	±%
BJP	Ritlal Prasad Verma	243,295	39.44	▲9.16
JD	Ramesh Prasad Yadav	1,96,341	31.83	▼1.34
INC	Umesh Chandra Agarwal	69,230	11.22	▼14.92
JMM	Salkhan Soren	49,542	8.03	New entry
CPI(ML)L	Mohan Datta	19,202	3.11	New entry
AIIC(T)	Sadan Ram	4,629	0.75	New entry
BSP	Parmanand Singh	3,081	0.50	New entry
Independent	19 Independent Candidates	31,586	5.12	N/A
Majority		46,954	7.61	▲4.72
Turnout				
Swing to BJP from JD		Swing		

=== 1991 ===
1991 Indian general election: Kodarma
Party	Candidate	Votes	%	±%
JD	Mumtaz Ansari	162,419	33.17	New entry
BJP	Ritlal Prasad Verma	1,48,297	30.28	▼15.19
INC	Tilakdhari Prasad Singh	1,28,003	26.14	▼0.25
IPF	Mahendra Pd. Singh	31,805	6.49	New entry
JP	Adibuzama Rizvi	2,104	0.43	New entry
Others	5 Other Party Candidates	5,600	1.15	N/A
Independent	16 Independent Candidates	11,458	2.35	N/A
Majority		14,122	2.89	▼16.19
Turnout				
Swing to JD from BJP		Swing		

=== 1989 ===
1989 Indian general election: Kodarma
Party	Candidate	Votes	%	±%
BJP	Ritlal Prasad Verma	243,805	45.47	▲18.02
INC	Tilakdhari Prasad Singh	1,41,511	26.39	▼32.46
JMM	Saba Ahmad	1,11,029	20.71	▲19.45
Independent	Mahendra Prasad Singh	30,788	5.74	N/A
Doordarshi Party	Karu Choudhary	3,190	0.59	New entry
Independent	Tribeni Rai	2,248	0.42	N/A
Independent	Sukhdeo Paswan	1,923	0.36	N/A
Independent	Sudha Rani Sinha	1,694	0.32	N/A
Majority		1,02,294	19.08	▼12.32
Turnout		5,48,098	56.86	
Swing to BJP from INC		Swing		

=== 1984 ===
1984 Indian general election: Kodarma
Party	Candidate	Votes	%	±%
INC	Tilak Dhari Singh	208,731	58.85	▲26.58
BJP	Ritlal Prasad Verma	97,348	27.45	New entry
Independent	Md. Enamul Haque	10,453	2.95	N/A
JP	Biswanath Modi	10,057	2.84	▼37.84
Independent	Nand Lal Gope	7,392	2.08	N/A
Independent	Ram Kishore Mehta	5,639	1.59	N/A
JMM	Pradeep Kumar Sarkar	4,470	1.26	New entry
Independent	Dinesh Singh	3,155	0.89	N/A
Independent	Abuinam Akhtar	1,974	0.56	N/A
Independent	Indra Kumar Agarwal	1,951	0.55	N/A
Independent	Sudha Rani Sinha	1,903	0.54	N/A
INC(J)	Yugal Kishore Pd.	1,043	0.29	New entry
Independent	Burhan Sahu	570	0.16	N/A
Majority		1,11,383	31.40	▲22.99
Turnout		3,66,462	47.79	
Swing to INC from JP		Swing		

=== 1980 ===
1980 Indian general election: Kodarma
Party	Candidate	Votes	%	±%
JP	Rati Lal Prasad Verma	108,236	40.68	▼26.66
INC(I)	Javed Warsi	85,870	32.27	▲11.06
INC(U)	Shankar Dayal Singh	31,375	11.79	New entry
Independent	Kharagdhari Singh	23,072	8.67	N/A
Independent	Laxmi Kant Sa	5,953	2.24	N/A
Independent	Girija Nandan Prasad Sinha	4,605	1.73	N/A
Independent	Ganpat Rai	2,608	0.98	N/A
Independent	Arun Rai	2,246	0.84	N/A
Independent	Surya Narain Ram	2,124	0.80	N/A
Majority		22,366	8.41	▼37.72
Turnout		2,74,331	40.38	
JP hold		Swing		

=== 1977 ===
1977 Indian general election: Kodarma
Party	Candidate	Votes	%	±%
JP	Ritlal Prasad Verma	169,387	67.34	New entry
INC	Chaplendu Bhattacharyyia	53,359	21.21	New entry
CPI	Ram Narain Prasad Yadav	21,377	8.50	New entry
Independent	Johan Marandi	7,412	2.95	N/A
Majority		1,16,028	46.13	New entry
Turnout		2,61,508	43.38	New entry
JP win (new seat)				

== See also ==
- Koderma
- Koderma district
- List of constituencies of the Lok Sabha
