= Gandey Assembly constituency =

Constituency of the Jharkhand legislative assembly in India

Coordinates: 24.186°N 86.437°E

Gandey
- Constituency No. 31 for the Jharkhand Legislative Assembly

Constituency details
- Country: India
- Region: East India
- State: Jharkhand
- District: Giridih
- Lok Sabha constituency: Kodarma
- Established: 2000
- Reservation: None

Member of Legislative Assembly
- 6th Jharkhand Legislative Assembly
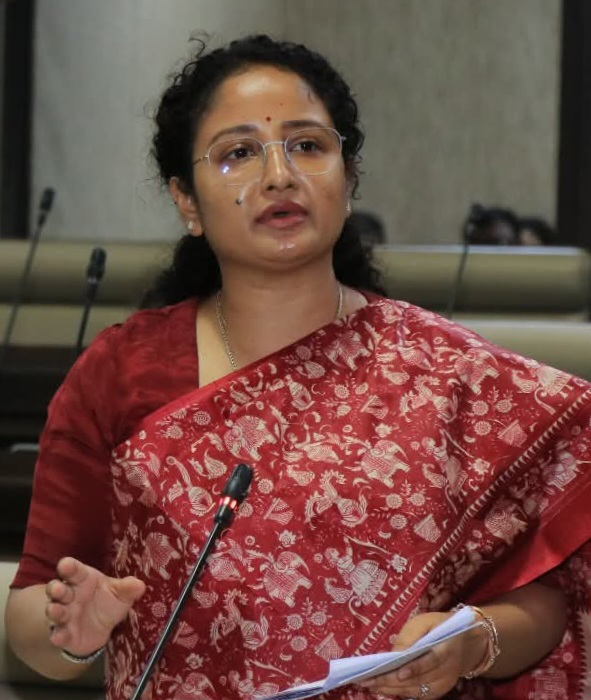
- Incumbent Kalpana Soren
- Party: JMM
- Alliance: MGB
- Elected year: 2024
- Preceded by: Dr. Sarfaraz Ahmad; JMM

Gandey Assembly constituency is an assembly constituency in the Indian state of Jharkhand.

== Members of the Legislative Assembly ==
Year	Member	Party
Bihar Legislative Assembly
Before 1977: Constituency did not exist
1977	Salkhan Soren	Janata Party
1980	Salkhan Soren	Indian National Congress
1985	Salkhan Soren	Jharkhand Mukti Morcha
1990	Salkhan Soren	Jharkhand Mukti Morcha
1995	Salkhan Soren	Bharatiya Janata Party
2000	Salkhan Soren	Jharkhand Mukti Morcha
Jharkhand Legislative Assembly
2005	Salkhan Soren	Jharkhand Mukti Morcha
2009		Indian National Congress
2014		Bharatiya Janata Party
2019		Jharkhand Mukti Morcha
2024^	Kalpana Soren	Jharkhand Mukti Morcha
2024	Kalpana Soren	Jharkhand Mukti Morcha

^by-election

== Election results ==
=== Assembly election 2024 ===
2024 Jharkhand Legislative Assembly election: Gandey
Party	Candidate	Votes	%	±%
JMM	Kalpana Soren	119,372	50.51%	▼1.04
BJP	Muniya Devi	1,02,230	43.26%	▲4.46
ASP(KR)	Arjun Baitha	2,760	1.17%	New
Independent	Rameshwar Dusadh	2,539	1.07%	New
NOTA	None of the Above	3,051	1.29%	▼0.69
Margin of victory		17,142	7.25%	▼5.49
Turnout		2,36,339	73.88%	▲5.02
Registered electors		3,19,910		▲1.07
JMM hold		Swing	▼1.04	

=== Assembly by-election 2024 ===
2024 Jharkhand Legislative Assembly by-election: Gandey
Party	Candidate	Votes	%	±%
JMM	Kalpana Soren	109,827	51.55%	▲16.84
BJP	Dilip Kumar Verma	82,678	38.80%	▲8.82
Independent	Arjun Baitha	6,960	3.27%	New
AIMIM	Intekhab Ansari	4,764	2.24%	New
Independent	Md. Kausar Azad	2,054	0.96%	New
Independent	Md. Sayeed Alam	1,988	0.93%	New
Independent	Awadhesh Kumar Singh	1,138	0.53%	New
NOTA	None of the above	4,219	1.98%	▼0.01
Margin of victory		27,149	12.74%	▲8.01
Turnout		2,13,069	68.86%	▼0.70
Registered electors		3,16,514		▲17.51
JMM hold		Swing	▲16.84	

=== Assembly election 2019 ===
2019 Jharkhand Legislative Assembly election: Gandey
Party	Candidate	Votes	%	±%
JMM	Dr. Sarfaraz Ahmad	65,023	34.71%	▲11.90
BJP	Jai Prakash Verma	56,168	29.98%	▲1.09
AJSU	Arjun Baitha	15,361	8.20%	New
Independent	Sunil Kumar Yadav	9,900	5.28%	New
Independent	Karmila Tudu	9,056	4.83%	New
JVM(P)	Dilip Kumar Verma	8,952	4.78%	▼1.97
CPI(ML)L	Rajesh Kumar	7,408	3.95%	▼2.67
NOTA	None of the Above	3,734	1.99%	New
Margin of victory		8,855	4.73%	▼1.35
Turnout		1,87,343	69.56%	▼1.13
Registered electors		2,69,330		▲12.63
JMM gain from BJP		Swing	▲5.81	

=== Assembly election 2014 ===
2014 Jharkhand Legislative Assembly election: Gandey
Party	Candidate	Votes	%	±%
BJP	Salkhan Soren	48,838	28.89%	▲12.21
JMM	Narendra Modi	38,559	22.81%	▼0.97
INC	Dr. Sarfaraz Ahmad	35,727	21.14%	▼9.09
JVM(P)	Laxman Swarnkar	11,407	6.75%	New
CPI(ML)L	Rajesh Kumar	11,202	6.63%	▼7.48
Independent	Mumtaz Ansari	3,579	2.12%	New
Independent	Shhadat Ansari	3,388	2.00%	New
NOTA	None of the Above	868	0.51%	New
Margin of victory		10,279	6.08%	▼0.37
Turnout		1,69,027	70.69%	▲5.01
Registered electors		2,39,127		▲19.81
BJP gain from INC		Swing	▼1.34	

=== Assembly election 2009 ===
2009 Jharkhand Legislative Assembly election: Gandey
Party	Candidate	Votes	%	±%
INC	Dr. Sarfaraz Ahmad	39,625	30.23%	New
JMM	Salkhan Soren	31,170	23.78%	▼4.68
BJP	Punam Prakash	21,865	16.68%	▼8.46
CPI(ML)L	Rajesh Yadav	18,497	14.11%	▲9.42
Independent	Hiralal Murmu	3,184	2.43%	New
AJSU	Anima Hansada	2,540	1.94%	New
RJD	Meenakshi Devi	2,428	1.85%	▼25.44
Margin of victory		8,455	6.45%	▲5.28
Turnout		1,31,078	65.67%	▲0.48
Registered electors		1,99,596		▲0.50
INC gain from JMM		Swing	▲1.77	

=== Assembly election 2005 ===
2005 Jharkhand Legislative Assembly election: Gandey
Party	Candidate	Votes	%	±%
JMM	Salkhan Soren	36,849	28.46%	▼3.21
RJD	Dr. Sarfaraz Ahmad	35,337	27.29%	▲11.86
BJP	Laxman Swarnkar	32,545	25.14%	▲1.45
CPI(ML)L	Rajesh Kumar	6,070	4.69%	New
BSP	Binod Kumar Verma	5,228	4.04%	▲1.14
Independent	Sidheshwar Haimbram	2,372	1.83%	New
SP	Praveen Singh	2,179	1.68%	▼3.42
Margin of victory		1,512	1.17%	▼6.82
Turnout		1,29,474	65.19%	▼1.80
Registered electors		1,98,602		▲19.11
JMM hold		Swing	▼3.21	

=== Assembly election 2000 ===
2000 Bihar Legislative Assembly election: Gandey
Party	Candidate	Votes	%	±%
JMM	Salkhan Soren	35,375	31.67%	New
BJP	Laxman Swarnkar	26,457	23.69%	New
INC	Dr. Sarfaraz Ahmad	19,693	17.63%	New
RJD	Shobha Yadav	17,240	15.44%	New
SP	Md. Kashim Naushad Ali	5,696	5.10%	New
BSP	Vinod Kumar Verma	3,235	2.90%	New
CPI	Shambhu Nath Mitra	2,392	2.14%	New
Margin of victory		8,918	7.98%	
Turnout		1,11,694	67.77%	
Registered electors		1,66,734		
JMM win (new seat)				

== See also ==
- Vidhan Sabha
- List of states of India by type of legislature
