= Jharkhand =

State in eastern India

- State
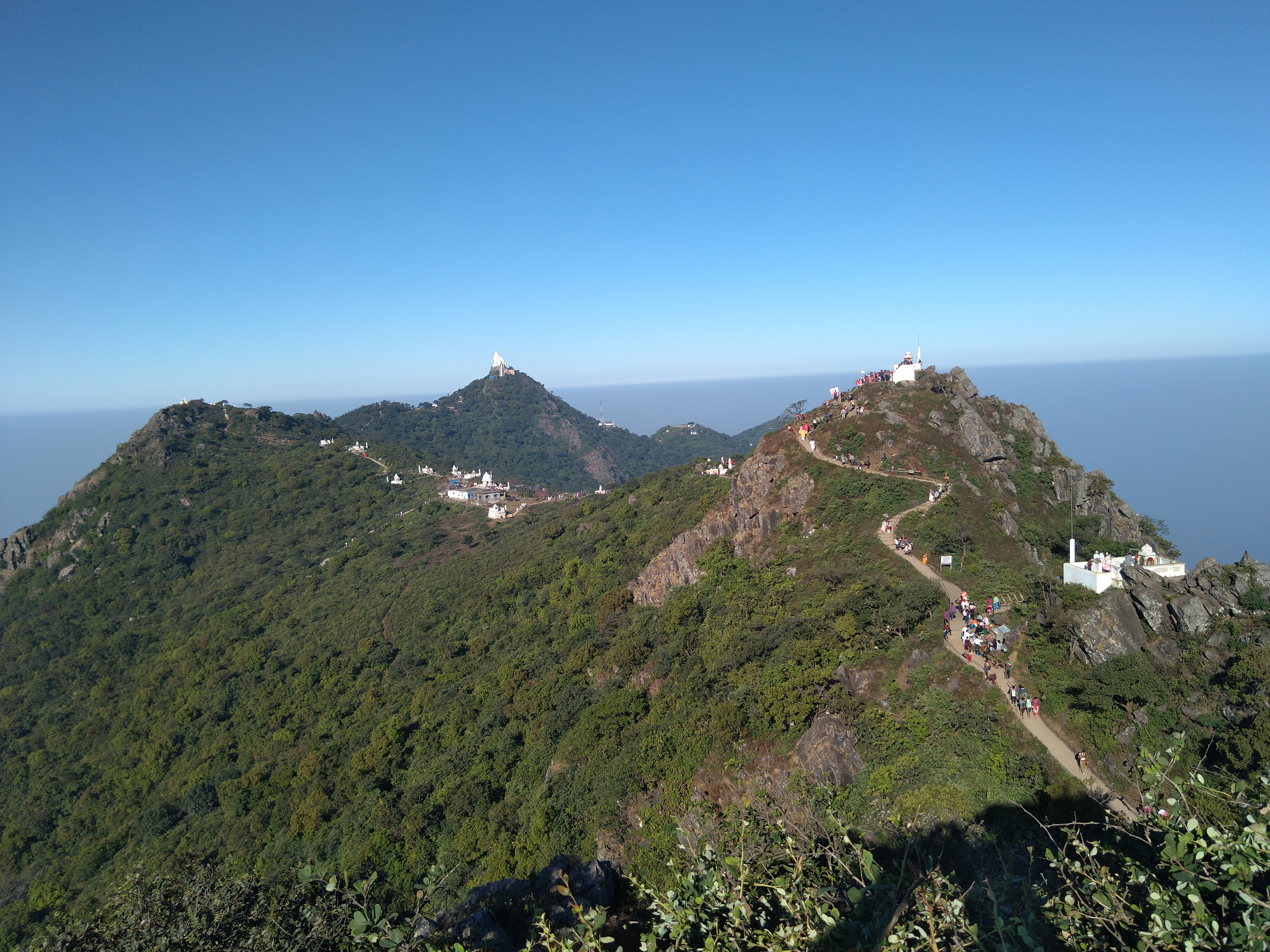
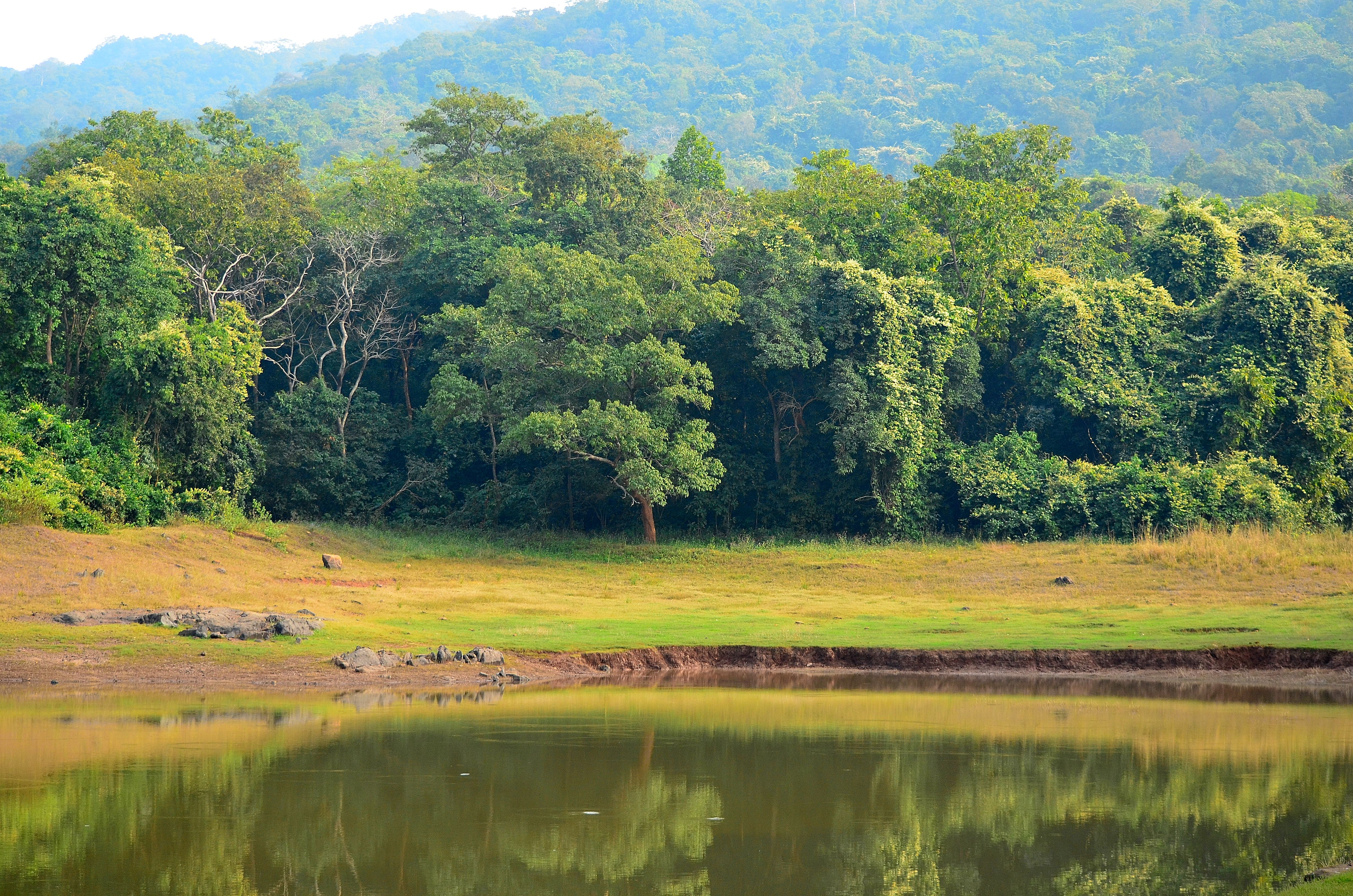
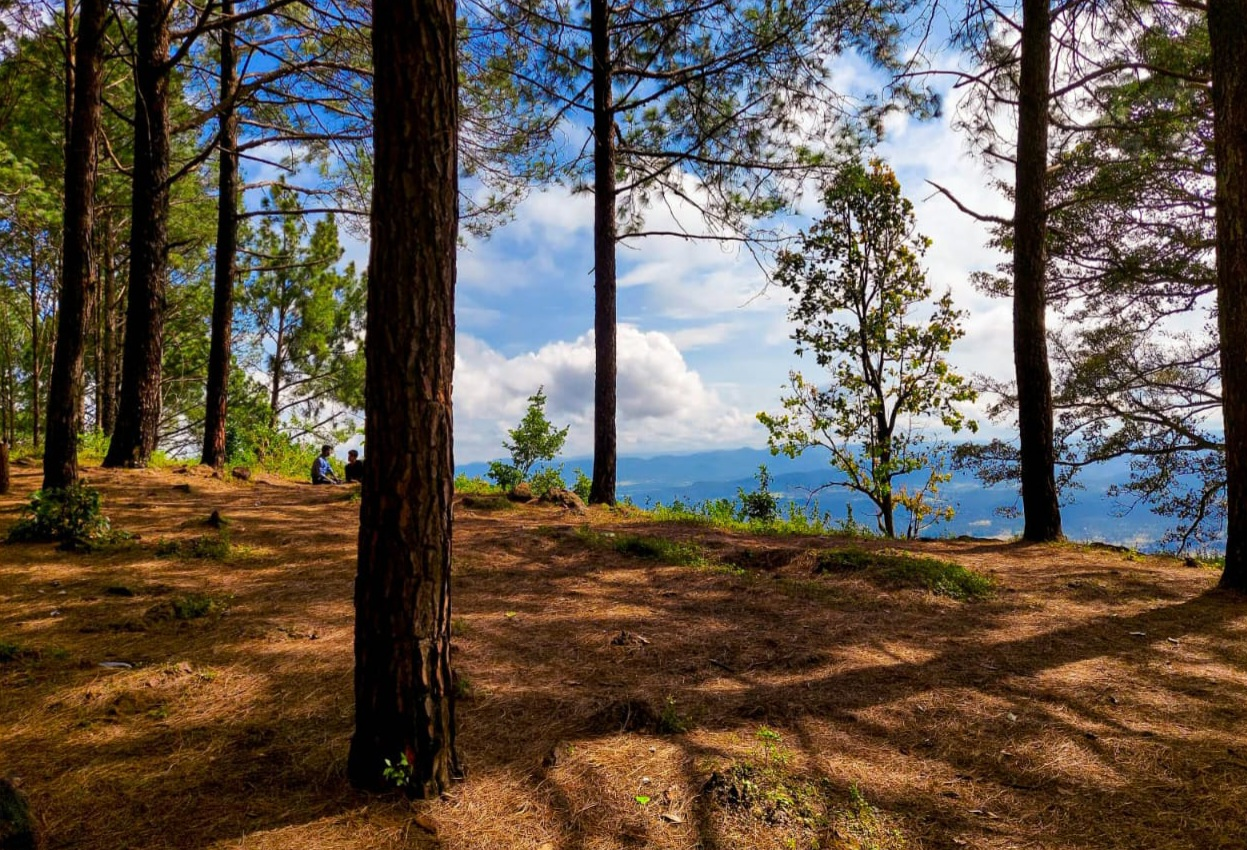
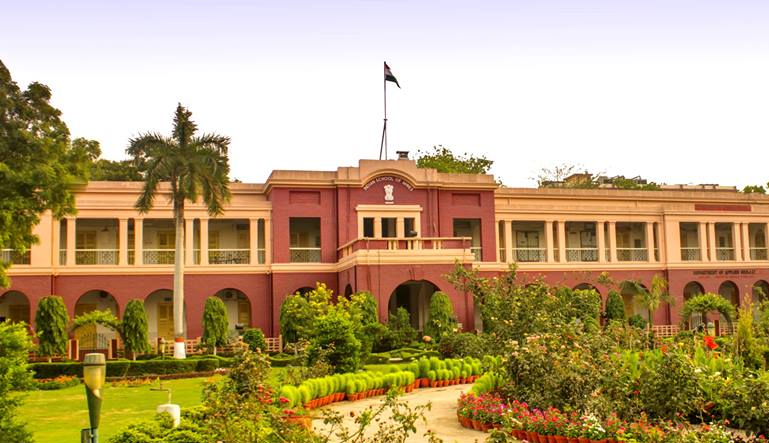
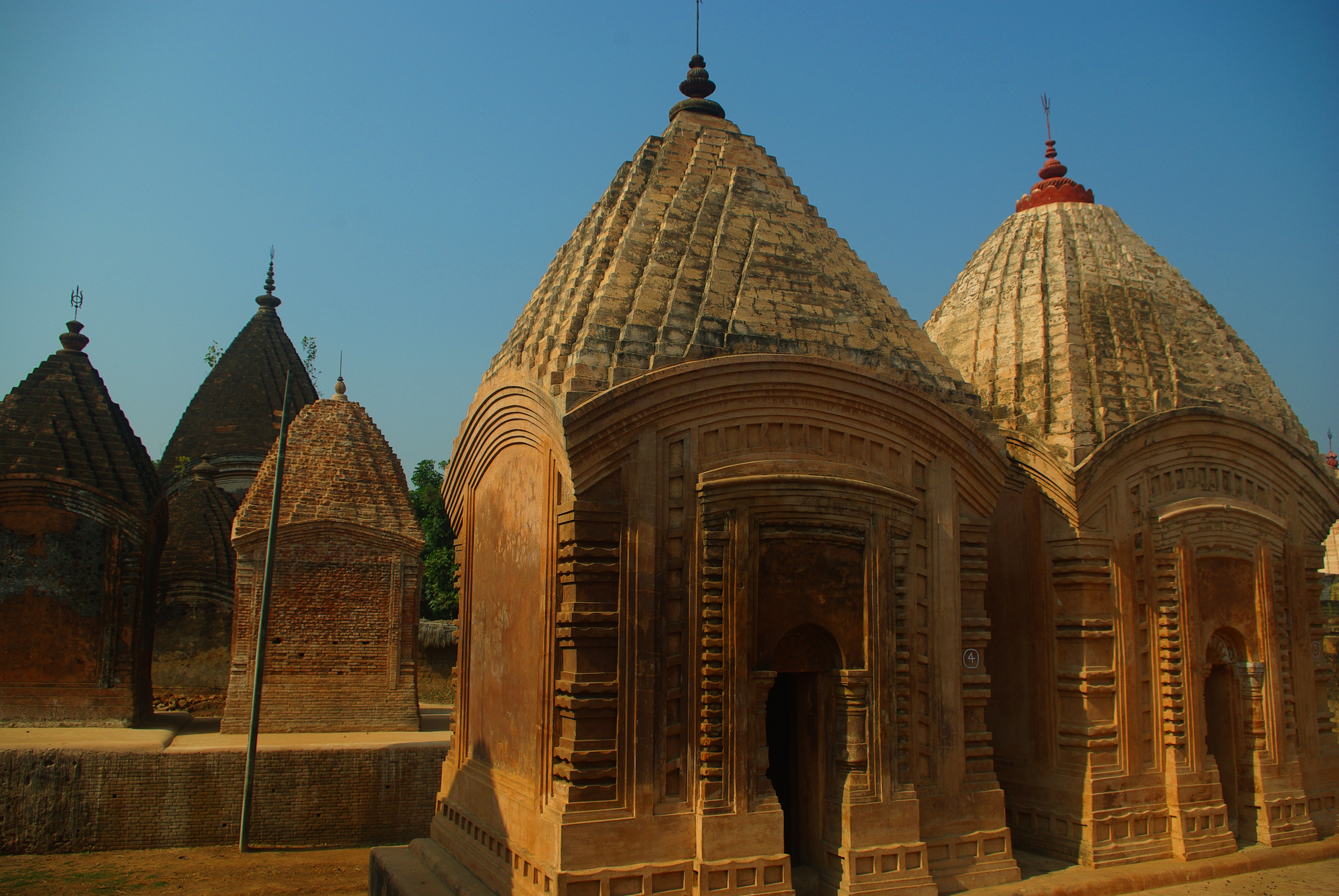
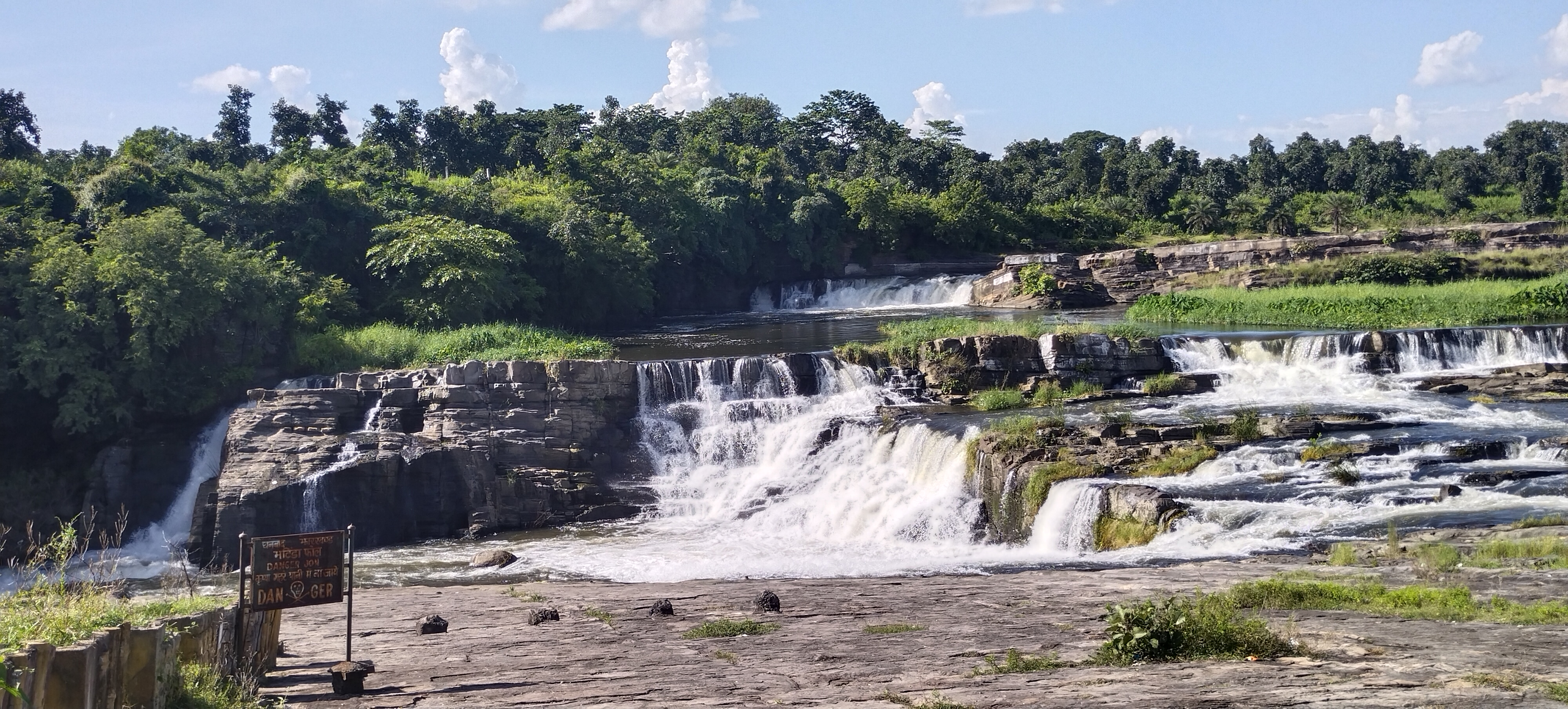
- Parasnath Hill Dalma Wildlife Sanctuary Netarhat Hill Station IIT Dhanbad Maluti temples Bhatinda Falls, Dhanbad

- Emblem of Jharkhand
- Etymology: "Forest Land"
- Nickname: "Land of Forests"
- Motto: Satyameva Jayate (Sanskrit) "Truth alone triumphs"
- Location of Jharkhand in India
- Coordinates: 23.35°N 85.33°E
- Country: India
- Region: East India
- Previously was: Part of Bihar
- Formation: 15 November 2000
- Capital: Ranchi
- Largest city: Jamshedpur
- Districts: 24 (5 divisions)

Government
  - Body: Government of Jharkhand
  - Governor: Santosh Gangwar
  - Chief Minister: Hemant Soren (JMM)
  - Chief Secretary: Avinash Kumar

Area
  - Total: 79,716 km^{2} (30,779 sq mi)
  - Rank: 15th

Dimensions
  - Length: 463 km (288 mi)
  - Width: 380 km (240 mi)
- Highest elevation (Parasnath): 1,365 m (4,478 ft)

Population (2011)
  - Total: ▲32,988,134
  - Rank: 14th
  - Density: 414/km^{2} (1,070/sq mi)
  - Urban: 24.05%
  - Rural: 75.95%
- Demonyms: Jharkhandi

Language
  - Official: Hindi
  - Additional official: Angika; Bengali; Bhojpuri; Bhumij; Ho; Kharia; Khortha; Kurmali; Kurukh; Magahi; Maithili; Mundari; Nagpuri; Odia; Santali; Urdu
  - Official script: Devanagari script

GDP
  - Total (2026-27): ▲₹624,868 crore (US$67 billion) (nominal) ▲$307.21 billion (PPP)
  - Rank: 19th
  - Per capita: ▲₹189,422 (US$2,000) (nominal) ▲$9,312 (PPP) (29th)
- Time zone: UTC+05:30 (IST)
- ISO 3166 code: IN-JH
- Vehicle registration: JH
- HDI (2022): ▲0.603 Medium (35th)
- Literacy (2024): 76.7% (32nd)
- Sex ratio (2021): 948♀/1000 ♂ (26th)
- Website: jharkhand.gov.in
- Symbols of Jharkhand
- Foundation day: Jharkhand Day
- Bird: Koel
- Fish: Clarias magur
- Flower: Palash
- Mammal: Indian elephant
- Tree: Sal
- State highway mark
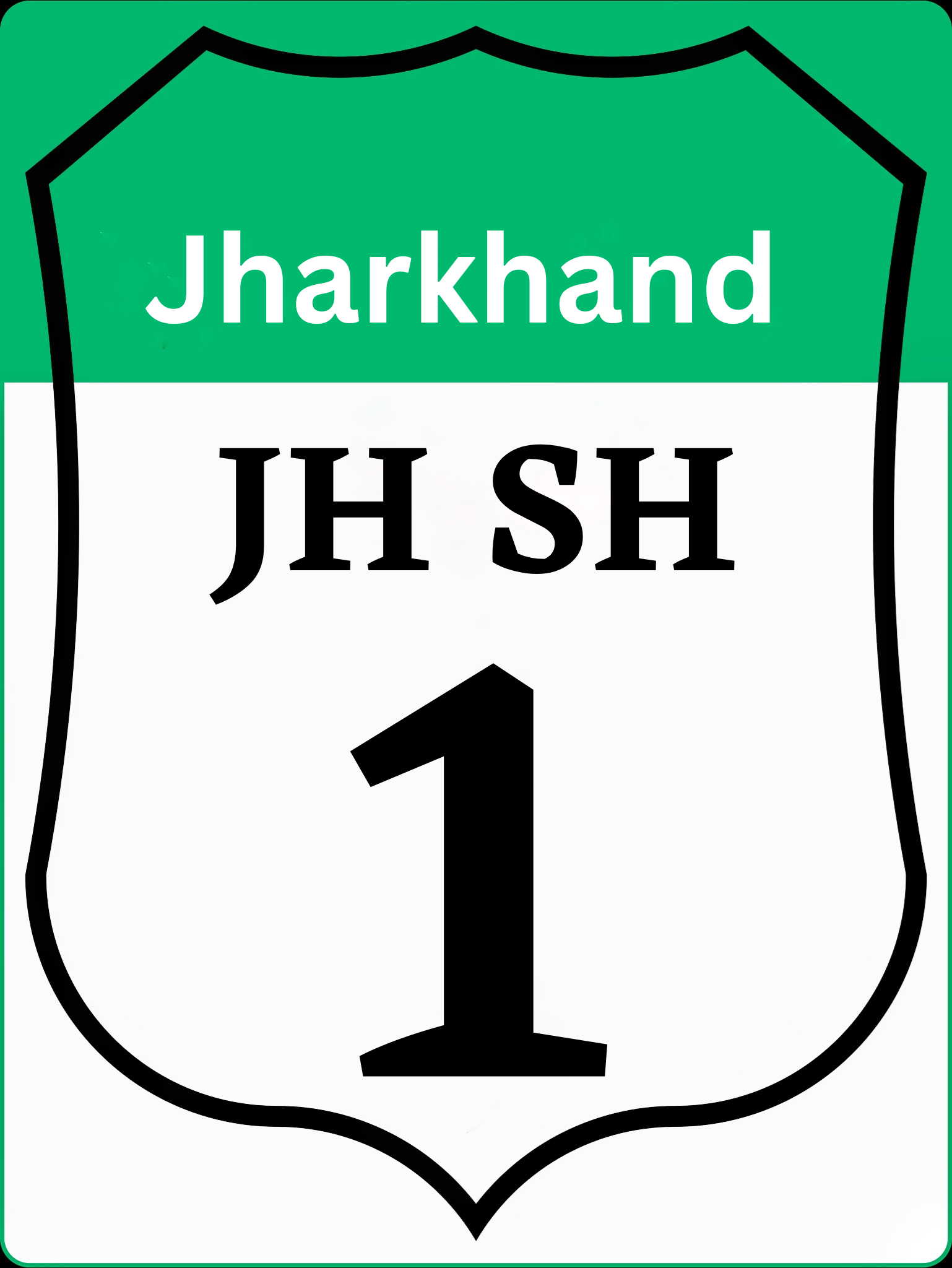
- State highway of Jharkhand; JH SH1 - JH SH
- List of Indian state symbols

Jharkhand (Hindi: Jhārkhaṇḍ, pronounced [d͡ʒʱaːɾkʰəɳɖ]; lit. 'the land of forests') is a landlocked state in eastern India. The state shares borders with the states of West Bengal to the east, Chhattisgarh to the west, Uttar Pradesh to the northwest, Bihar to the north and Odisha to the south. It is the 15th largest state by area, and the 14th largest by population. Hindi is the official language of the state. The city of Ranchi is its capital, and Dumka its sub-capital. The state is known for its waterfalls, hills and holy places; Baidyanath Dham, Parasnath, Dewri and Rajrappa are major religious sites. As per the 2011 census, Jharkhand is primarily rural, with about 24% of its population living in cities.

Jharkhand suffers from what is sometimes termed a resource curse: it accounts for more than 40% of India's mineral production but 39.1% of its population is below the poverty line and 19.6% of children under five years of age are malnourished.

== Etymology ==
The word "Jhar" means 'forest' and "Khand" means 'land' in various Indo-Aryan languages. Thus, "Jharkhand" means 'the land of forests'.

In the Hindu epic Mahabharata, the region was referred as Kark Khand due to its location near Kark Rekha, that is, Tropic of Cancer. It was also known as Ark Khand. During the Medieval period, the region was known as Jharkhand. According to Bhavishya Purana (1200 CE), Jharkhand was one of the seven Pundra desa. The name is first found on a 13th-century copper plate in Kendrapada, Odisha, from the reign of Narasimha Deva II of Eastern Ganga dynasty. Forest land from Baidhnath dham to Puri was known as Jharkhand. In Akbarnama, from Panchet in the east to Ratanpur to west, Rohtasgarh to the north and the frontier of Odisha to the south was known as Jharkhand.

== History ==
=== Ancient period ===
The region has been inhabited since the Mesolithic-Chalcolithic period, as shown by several ancient cave paintings. Stone tools have been discovered from Chota Nagpur Plateau region which are from the Mesolithic and Neolithic periods. There are ancient cave paintings in Isko, Hazaribagh district which are from Meso-chalcolithic period (9000–5000 BCE). During 2nd millennium BCE the use of Copper tools spread in Chota Nagpur Plateau and these find complexes are known as the Copper Hoard Culture. In the Kabra-Kala mound at the confluence of the Son and North Koel rivers in Palamu district various antiquities and art objects have been found which are from the Neolithic to the medieval period and pot-sherds of Redware, black and red ware, black ware, black slipped ware and NBP ware are from Chalcolithic to the late medieval period. Several iron slags, microliths, and potsherds have been discovered from Singhbhum district that are from 1400 BCE according to carbon dating age. The region was ruled by many empires and dynasties including Nanda, Maurya and Gupta during ancient period.

In the Mahabharata, the region was referred as Kark Khand due to its location near Tropic of Cancer. During the age of Mahajanpadas around 500 BCE, Jharkhand state was a part of Magadha and Anga. In the Mauryan period, this region was ruled by a number of states, which were collectively known as the Atavika (forest) states. These states were subdued and were forced to accept the hegemony of the Maurya Empire during Ashoka's reign (c. 232 BCE). In the ancient site of Saridkel, burnt brick houses, red ware pottery, copper tools, coins and iron tools have been found which belong to the early centuries CE. Brahmi inscriptions have been found in Khunti district which are from the 3rd century BCE. Samudragupta, while marching through the present-day Chotanagpur region (North and South), directed the first attack against the kingdom of Dakshina Kosala in the Mahanadi valley.

=== Medieval period ===
In the 7th century, the Chinese traveller Xuanzang passed through the region. He described the kingdom as Karnasuvarna, with Shashanka as its ruler. To the north of Karn-Suberna was Magadha, Champa was in the east, Mahendra in the west, and Orissa in the south.

During the medieval period, the region was governed by Nagvanshi, Pala, Khayaravala, Ramgarh Raj and Chero rulers. A Buddhist monastery has been found in Hazaribagh which was built during the Pala period in the 10th century. Bhim Karn was a Nagvanshi king during medieval period. He defeated the Raksel dynasty of Surguja when they invaded the region with cavalry.

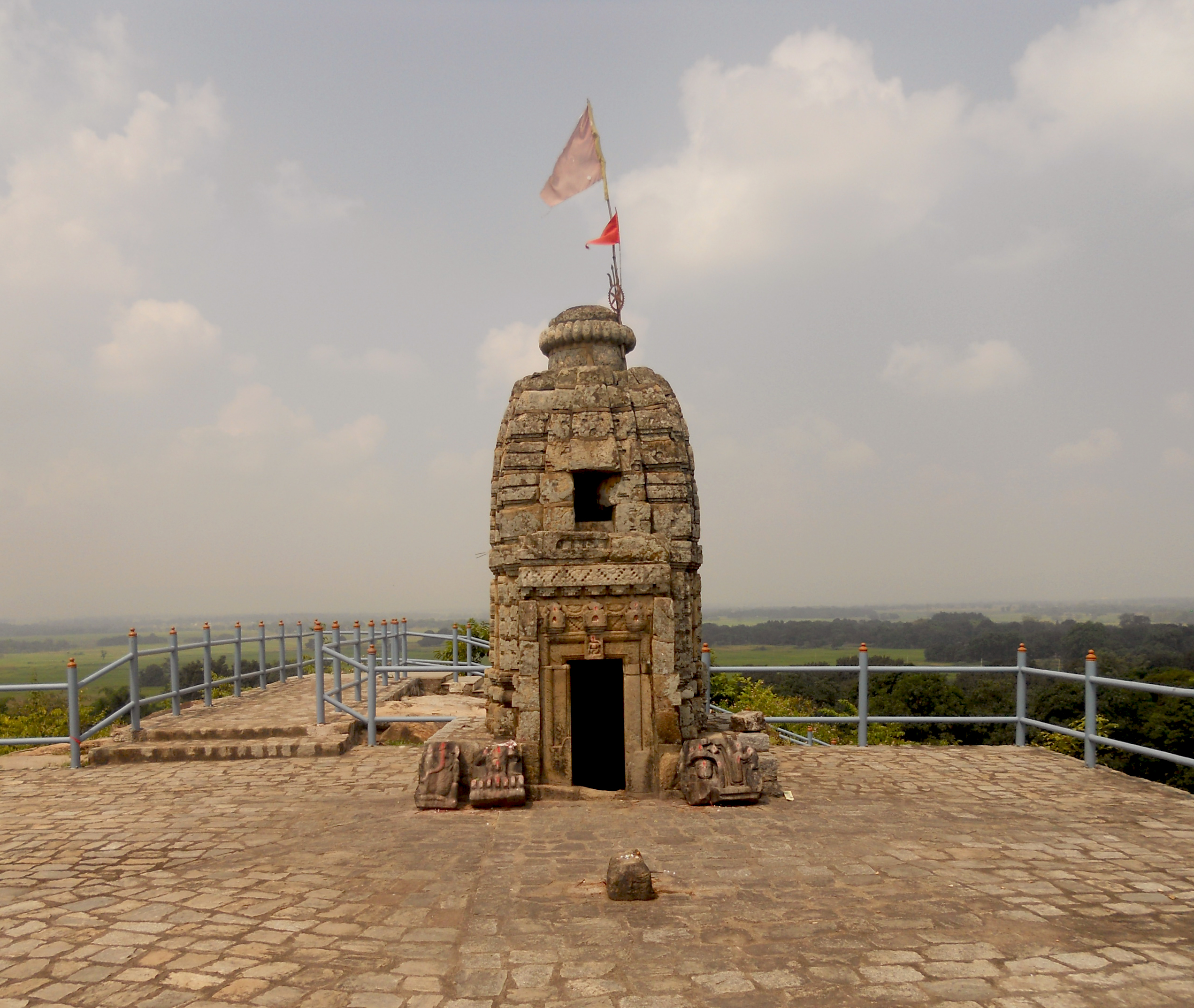
Khakparta Temple, a 9th-century Shiva temple in Lohardaga

=== Modern period ===
Mughal influence reached Palamu during the reign of Emperor Akbar when it was conquered by Rajput Raja Mansingh in 1574. Several invasions took place during Mughal rule. During the reign of the Nagvanshi King Madhu Singh, Akbar's general invaded Khukhra. Also there was an invasion during the reign of Durjan Shah.

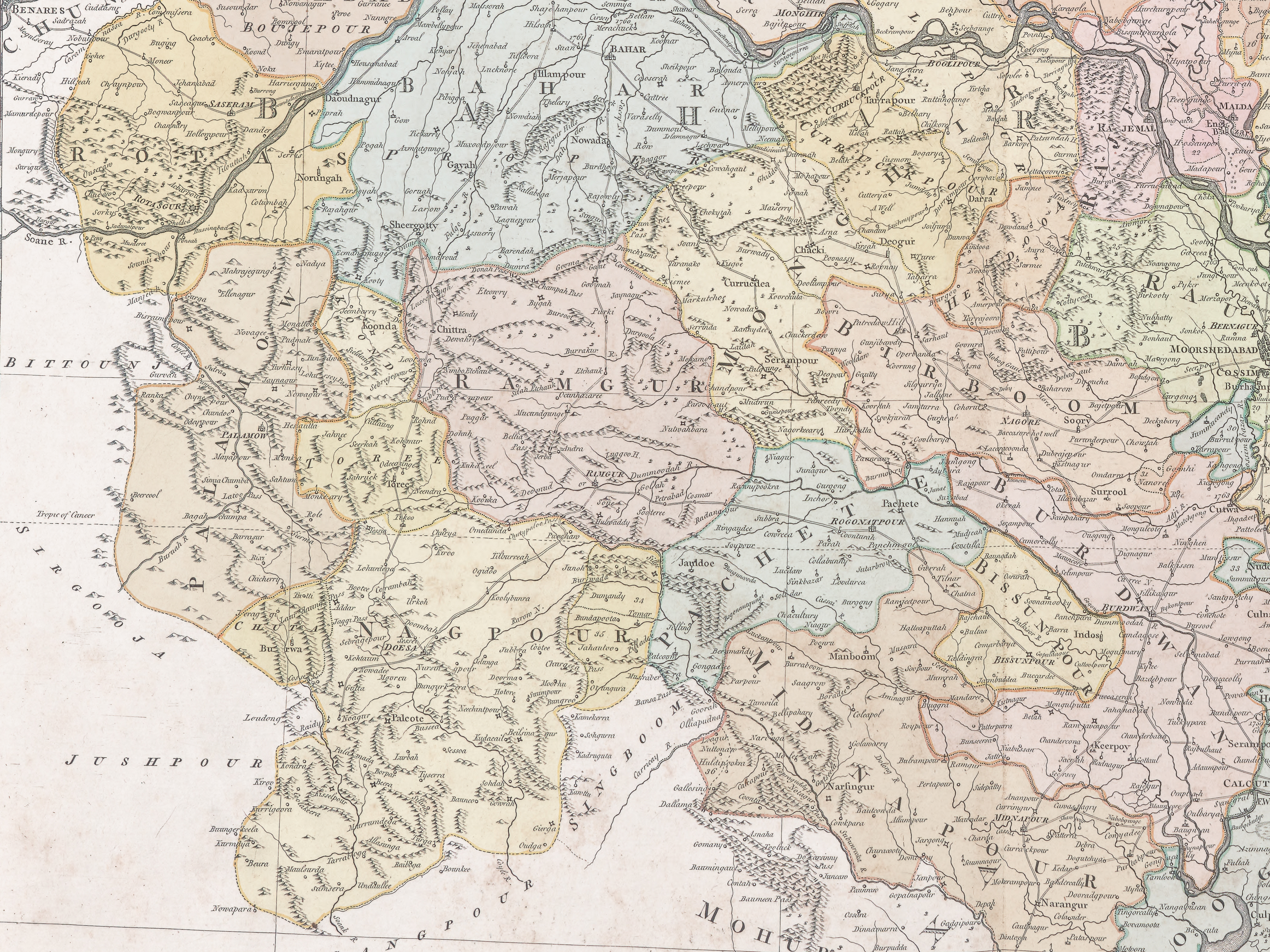
Administrative jurisdictions of present-day Jharkhand region in 1770s

King Ram Shah ruled Navratangarh from 1640 to 1663. He built the Kapilnath Temple in 1643. He was succeeded by his son Raghunath Shah. Thakur Ani Nath Shahdeo built the Jagannath temple of Ranchi in 1691. The King Medini Ray ruled from 1658 to 1674 in Palamu. His rule extended to areas in South Gaya and Hazaribagh. He attacked Navratangarh and defeated the Nagvanshi Maharaja of Chhotanagpur. Chero rule in the Palamu region lasted until the 19th century until internal conflict between various factions weakened the Cheros and they were defeated by the East India Company. Later Palamu estates were sold by the British.

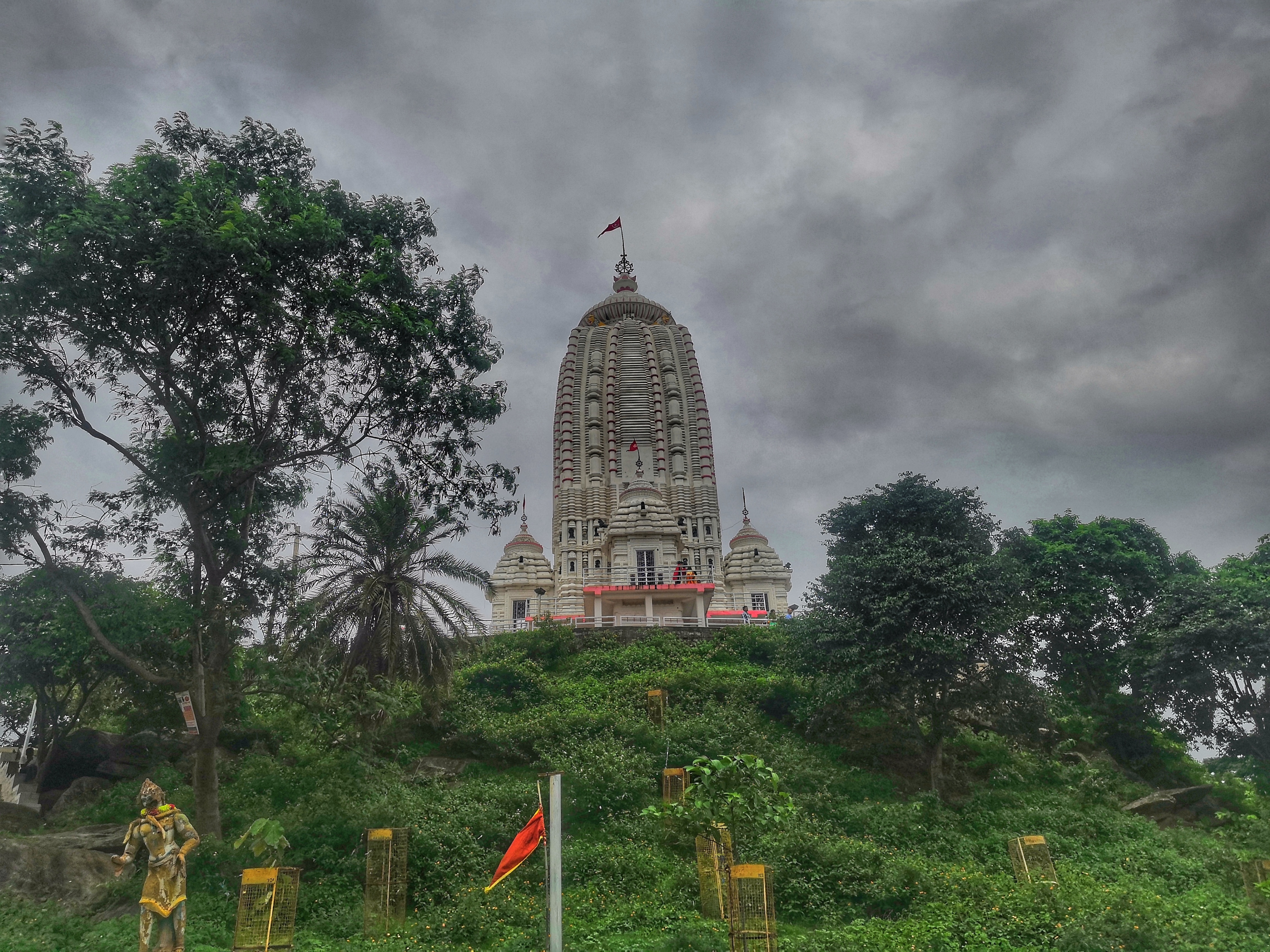
Jagannath temple at Ranchi built by King Ani Nath Shahdeo

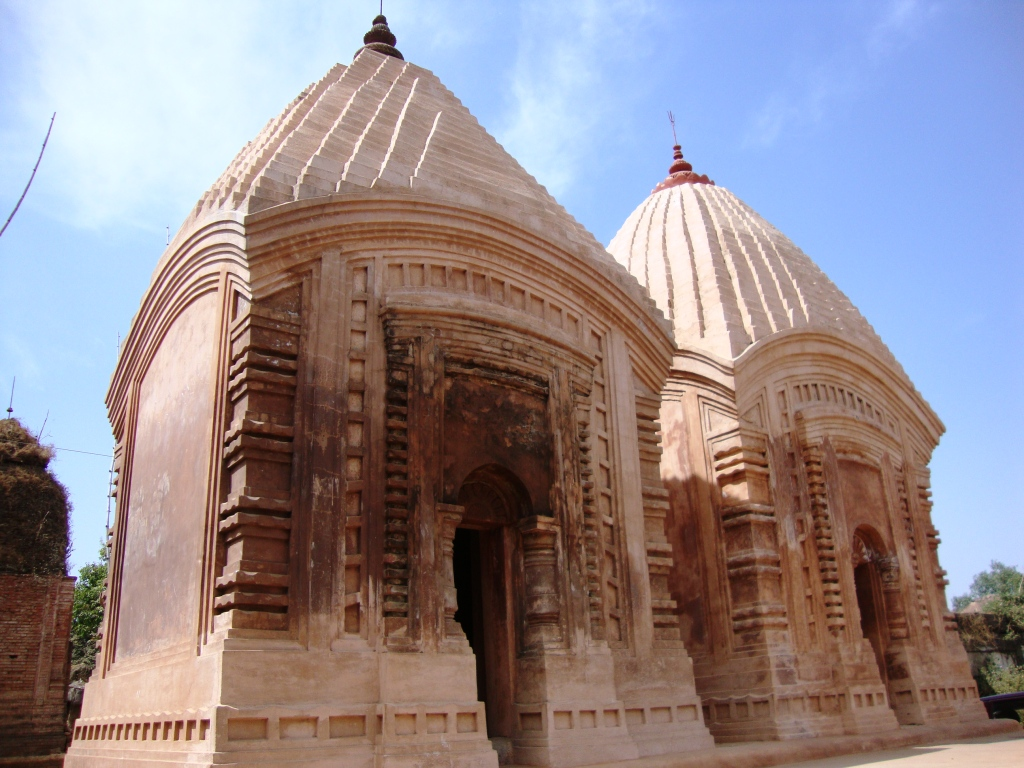
Maluti temples in Dumka

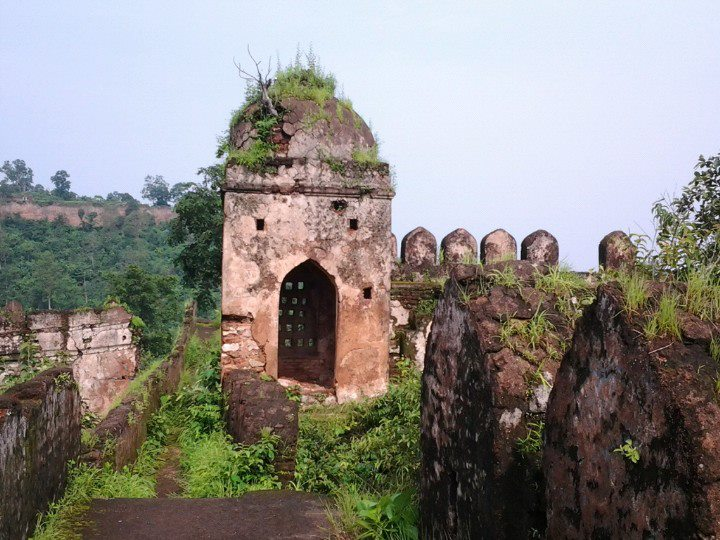
Palamu Forts

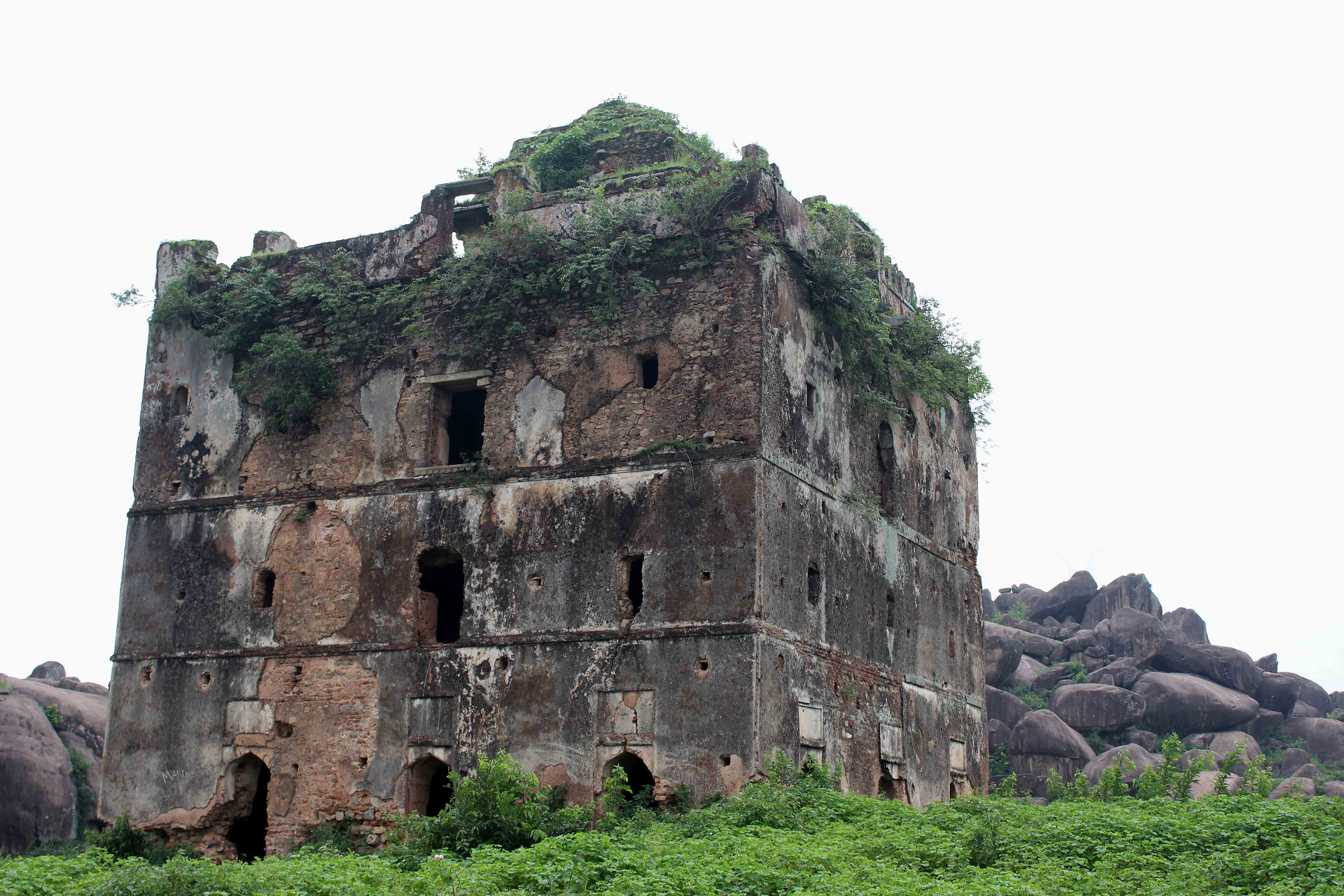
Navratangarh fort, c. 1670

During the 18th century, regions under the Chero dynasty, Nagvanshi dynasty, Ramgarh and Kharagdiha became territories of the East India Company. Ramgarh Raj along with estates of other chiefs in the regions were permanently settled as Zamindari estates. The Kharagdiha Rajas were settled as Rajas of Raj Dhanwar in 1809, and the Kharagdiha gadis were separately settled as zamindari estates. Some of the notable Kharagdiha Zamindari estates were Koderma, Gadi Palganj and Ledo Gadi. The princely states in the Chota Nagpur Plateau came within the sphere of influence of the Maratha Empire, but they became tributary states of East India Company as a result of the Anglo-Maratha Wars and became known as Chota Nagpur Tributary States.

Subjugation, colonisation and imposition of taxes by the British East India Company resulted in spontaneous resistance from the local people. Chuar Rebellion, the first revolt against the British East India Company was led by Jagannath Singh Patar in 1767 with the Bhumij tribals. The Bhumijes again revolted in 1769–71, led by their Sardar Ghatwals in Dhalbhum. In 1769, Raghunath Mahato also revolted against the East India Company.

In 1771, a revolt against the landlords and the British government was led by Tilka Majhi, a Paharia leader in Rajmahal Hills. Soon after in 1779, the Bhumij tribes again rose in arms against the British rule in Manbhum, called the Chuar Rebellion. In 1807, the Oraons in Barway murdered their landlord from Srinagar. The Munda tribe rose in revolt in 1811 and 1813. Bakhtar Say and Mundal Singh, two landowners, fought against the British East India Company in 1812.

The Hos in Singhbhum revolted in 1820 and a Kol revolt occurred in 1832. Also in 1832 the Bhumijs revolted again against the British, this time under the leadership of Ganga Narayan Singh, known as the Bhumij rebellion. During the 19th century, large numbers of santals from Manbhum, Hazaribagh, Midnapore were settled by British in Damin-i-koh to cultivate the land and generate revenue. But the Santal revolted against the tax imposition. The Santhal rebellion broke out in 1855 under the leadership of two brothers Sidhu and Kanhu. Later the British renamed it Santal Pargana.

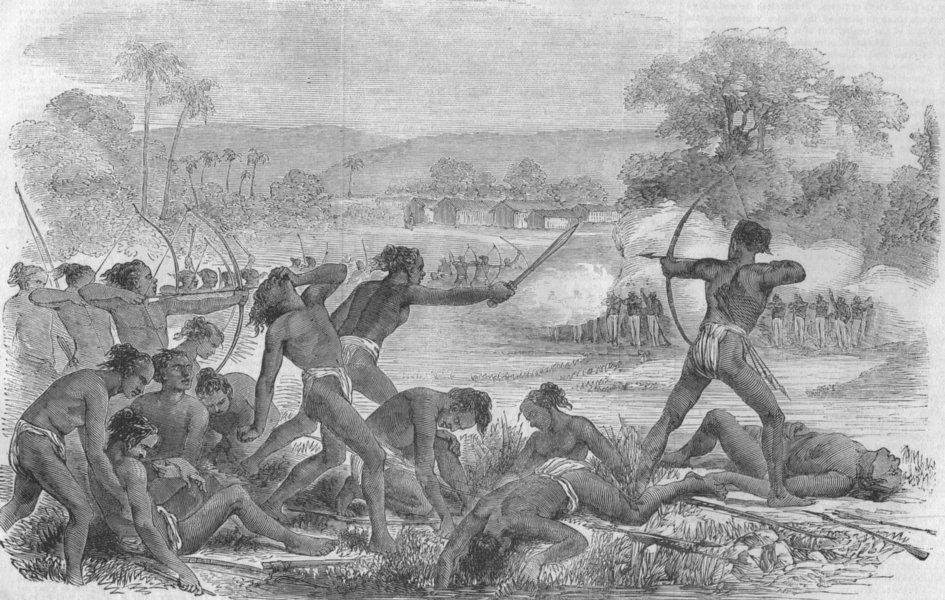
Santhal rebellion against tax imposition during British Company Raj in 1855

Thakur Vishwanath Shahdeo and Pandey Ganpat Rai rebelled against the British East India Company in the 1857 rebellion. In the Battle of Chatra, conflict took place between the rebels and the East India company. Tikait Umrao Singh, Sheikh Bhikhari, Nadir Ali and Jai Mangal Singh played pivotal role in the Indian Rebellion of 1857. The brothers Nilambar and Pitambar were chiefs of Bhogta clan of the Kharwar tribe who held ancestral jagirs with many Chero Jagirdars and led revolt against the British East India company.

After the Indian Rebellion of 1857, the rule of the British East India Company was transferred to the Crown in the person of Queen Victoria, who, in 1876, was proclaimed Empress of India. The Cheros and Kharwars again rebelled against the British in 1882 but the attack was repulsed. Then Birsa Munda revolt, broke out in 1895 and lasted until 1900. The revolt though mainly concentrated in the Munda belt of Khunti, Tamar, Sarwada and Bandgaon.

In October 1905, the exercise of British influence over the predominantly Hindi-speaking states of Chang Bhakar, Jashpur, Koriya, Surguja, and Udaipur was transferred from the Bengal government to that of the Central Provinces, while the two Oriya-speaking states of Gangpur and Bonai were attached to the Orissa Tributary States, leaving only Kharsawan and Saraikela answerable to the Bengal governor.

In 1936, all nine states were transferred to the Eastern States Agency, the officials of which came under the direct authority of the Governor-General of India, rather than under that of any provinces.

In March 1940, the Indian National Congress (INC) 53rd Session occurred under the presidency of Maulana Azad at Jhanda Chowk, Ramgarh, which is now Ramgarh Cantonment. Mahatma Gandhi, Jawaharlal Nehru, Sardar Patel, Rajendra Prasad, Sarojini Naidu, Khan Abdul Ghaffar Khan, Acharya J.B. Kripalani, Industrialist Jamnalal Bajaj and other great leaders of the Indian freedom movement attended the Ramgarh Session. Mahatma Gandhi also opened the Khadi and Village Industries Exhibition at Ramgarh.

At that time, under the leadership of Netaji Subhash Chandra Bose a conference against Samjhauta was also completed. In Ramgarh, Subhas Chandra Bose was seen as president of the All India Forward Block and M. N. Roy was seen as leader of the Radical democratic party.

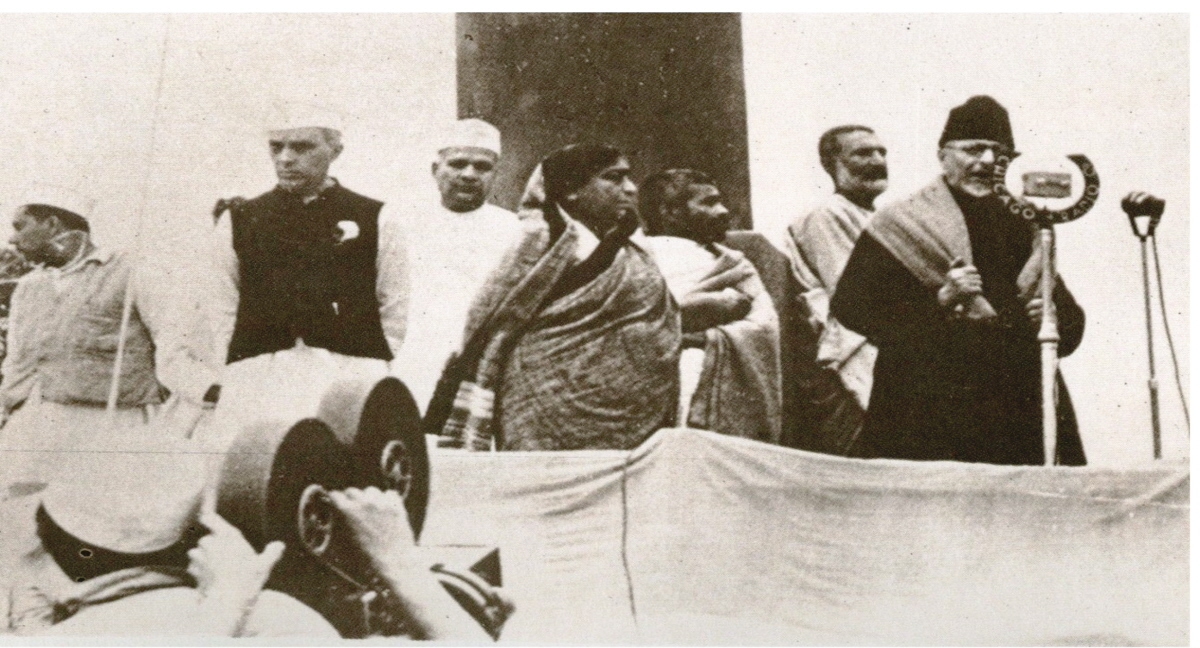
Jawaharlal Nehru, industrialist Jamnalal Bajaj, Sarojini Naidu, Khan Abdul Ghaffar Khan, and Maulana Azad at the 1940 Ramgarh session of the Indian National Congress.

=== Post Independence ===
After Indian independence in 1947, the rulers of many states chose to accede to the Dominion of India. Changbhakar, Jashpur, Koriya, Surguja and Udaipur after that became part of the state of Madhya Pradesh, but Gangpur and Bonai became part of the state of Orissa and Kharsawan and Saraikela became part of the state of Bihar. In 1928, a separate state was demanded by Unnati Samaj, the political wing of the Christian Tribals Association, which submitted a memorandum to the Simon Commission to constitute a tribal state in eastern India. Prominent leaders like Jaipal Singh Munda and Ram Narayan Singh also demanded a separate state. In 1955, the Jharkhand Party, led by Jaipal Singh Munda, submitted a memorandum to the States Reorganization Commission for a separate Jharkhand state comprising the tribal area of South Bihar, but it was rejected because there were many languages, no link language in the region, tribals were in the minority, Hindustani was the majority language, and it risked adverse effect on the economy of Bihar.

Later the Sadan people, the native various caste/non-tribal groups, also joined the movement for a separate state. In 1972, Binod Bihari Mahato, Shibu Soren and A. K. Roy founded Jharkhand Mukti Morcha. Nirmal Mahto founded the All Jharkhand Students Union. They led the movement for a separate state of Jharkhand. The Jharkhand coordination committee (JCC), consisting of Ram Dayal Munda, B. P. Keshri, Binod Bihari Mahato, Santosh Rana and Suraj Singh Besra started a new initiative and tried to coordinate between different parties. Keshri sent a memorandum to form Jharkhand state in 1988. The Jharkhand co-ordination committee was then led by Congress General Secretary Ram Ratan Ram, who urged Rajiv Gandhi to pay attention to the issue at hand.

In July 1988, the Bharatiya Janata party led by Atal Bihari Vajpayee, Lal Krishna Advani, and Murli Manohar Joshi decided to demand a separate state, Vanachal, comprising the forest region of South Bihar in Jamshedpur. Inder Singh Namdhari, Samresh Singh, and Rudra Pratap Sarangi were the leaders of the Vanachal movement. They organised several rallies to form a separate state.

The central government formed a committee on the Jharkhand matter in 1989. It stressed the need for greater allocation of development funds for the area. There was a provision for limited internal autonomy in the hill area of Assam. Other tribal areas were covered by the fifth schedule of the constitution. Chotanagpur and Santal Pargana development boards were constituted under the chairmanship of the then chief minister of Bihar under the provision of the fifth schedule in 1972. This failed to achieve the desired result. Jharkhand Mukti Morcha wanted more representation and the All Jharkhand Students Union was against it. Due to differences these parties broke away from each other. The All Jharkhand Students Union introduced elements of violence in the movement and called for a boycott of election while Jharkhand Mukti Morcha opposed this. The Jharkhand Area Autonomous Council bill passed in Bihar's legislative assembly in December 1994. The Jharkhand Area Autonomous Council were given responsibility for forty areas including agriculture, rural health, public work, public health and minerals. The council has power to recommend legislation to the Assembly through the state government and to frame bylaws and regulations.

In 1998, when the separate state movement was falling apart, Justice Lal Pingley Nath Shahdeo was leading the movement. In 1998, the Union government decided to send the bill concerning the formation of the state of Jharkhand to the Bihar Legislative Assembly to which Lalu Prasad Yadav had said that the state would be divided over his dead body. A total of 16 political parties including the Bharatiya Janata Party, Jharkhand Mukti Morcha, the All Jharkhand Students Union, and the Congress came in one platform and formed the 'All Party Separate State Formation Committee' to start the movement. Shahdeo was elected as the convener of the committee. Voting on the Jharkhand Act was to be done on 21 September 1998 in the Bihar legislature. On that day the committee, under the leadership of Shahdeo called for Jharkhand Bandh and organised a protest march. Thousands of supporters of a separate state took to the streets led by Shahdeo. He was arrested and detained in a police station for hours along with many supporters.

In 1999 the Bharatiya Janata party promised to form a separate Vanachal state if they won the state election with a majority of votes. After the last Assembly election in the state resulted in a hung assembly, RJD's dependence on the Congress extended support on the precondition that RJD would not pose a hurdle to the passage of the Bihar reorganisation Bill. Finally, with the support from both RJD and Congress, the ruling coalition at the Centre led by the Bharatiya Janata Party which had made statehood its main poll plank in the region in successive polls earlier, cleared the Bihar reorganisation Bill in the monsoon session of the Parliament on 2 and 11 August in Loksabha and Rajyasabha. This paved the way for the creation of a separate Vanachal state comprising the Chota Nagpur Division and Santhal Pargana Division of South Bihar. NDA formed the government with Babulal Marandi as chief minister. Later the name of the state was changed from Vanachal to Jharkhand. Babulal Marandi took the oath of chief minister on 15 November 2000 on the anniversary of the birth of tribal leader Birsa Munda.

=== Jharkhand statehood ===
The dynamics of resources and the politics of development still influence the socio-economic structures in Jharkhand, which was carved out of the relatively underdeveloped southern part of Bihar. According to the 1991 census, the state has a population of over 20 million out of which 28% is tribal while 12% of the people belong to scheduled castes. Jharkhand has 24 districts, 260 blocks, and 32,620 villages out of which only 45% have access to electricity while only 8,484 are connected by roads. Jharkhand is the leading producer of mineral wealth in the country after Chhattisgarh state, endowed as it is with a vast variety of minerals like iron ore, coal, copper ore, mica, bauxite, graphite, limestone, and uranium. Jharkhand is also known for its vast forest resources.

=== Naxal insurgency ===
Jharkhand has been at the centre of the Naxalite–Maoist insurgency. Since the uprising of the Naxalites in 1967, 6,000 people have been killed in fighting between the Naxalites and counter-insurgency operations by the police, and paramilitary groups such as the Salwa Judum.

Jharkhand is part of the "Red Corridor", which comprises 92,000 square kilometres, where the highest concentration of the group's estimated 20,000 combatants fight. Part of this is due to the fact that the state harbours an abundance of natural resources, while its people live in abject poverty and destitution. The impoverished state provides ample recruits for communist insurgents, who argue that they are fighting on behalf of the landless poor and tribals that see few benefits from the resource extractions. As the federal government holds a monopoly on sub-surface resources in the state, the tribal population is prevented from staking any claim on the resources extracted from their land. In response, the insurgents have recently begun a campaign of targeting infrastructure related to the extraction of resources vital for Indian energy needs, such as coal.

On 5 March 2007, Sunil Mahato, a member of the national parliament, was killed by Naxalite rebels near Kishanpur while watching a football match on the Hindu festival of Holi. His widow, Suman Mahato, the Jharkhand Mukti Morcha candidate, won the Jamshedpur Lok Sabha by-election in September 2007 and served in parliament until 2009.

== Geography ==
Jharkhand is located in the eastern part of India and is enclosed by West Bengal to the east, Chhattisgarh and Uttar Pradesh to the west, Bihar to the north and Odisha to the south.

Jharkhand envelops a geographical area of 79,716 square kilometres (30,779 sq mi). Much of Jharkhand lies on the Chota Nagpur Plateau. Many rivers pass through the Chota Nagpur plateau. They are: Damodar, North Koel, Barakar, South Koel, Sankh and Subarnarekha rivers. The higher watersheds of these rivers stretch out within the Jharkhand state. Much of the Jharkhand state is still enclosed by forest. Forests sustain the population of elephants and tigers.

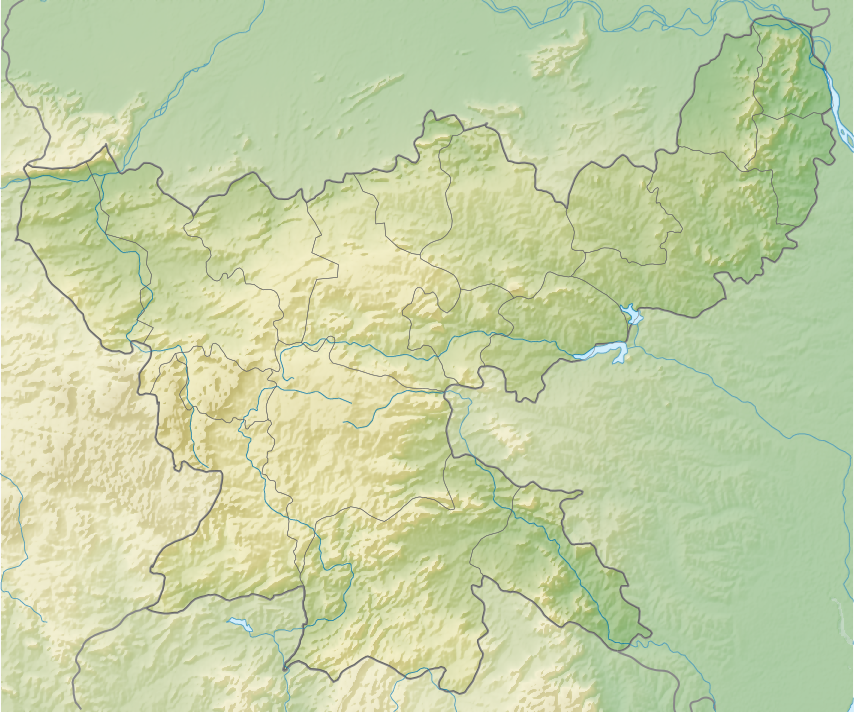
Physical map of Jharkhand

=== Climate ===
Climate of Jharkhand varies from humid subtropical in the north to tropical wet and dry in the south-east. The main seasons are summer, rainy, autumn, winter and spring. The summer lasts from mid-April to mid-June. May, the hottest month, characterised by daily high temperatures around 37 °C (99 °F) and low temperatures around 25 °C (77 °F). The southwest monsoon, from mid-June to October, brings nearly all the state's annual rainfall, which ranges from about 1,000 mm (40 in) in the west-central part of the state to more than 1,500 mm (60 in) in the southwest. Nearly half of the annual precipitation falls in July and August. The winter season lasts from November to February. The temperatures in Ranchi in December usually vary from 10–24 °C (50–75 °F). Spring season lasts from mid-February to mid-April.

=== Hills and mountain ranges ===
- Parasnath: Parasnath Hill is also called as Sri Sammed Sikharji by Jains and Marang Buru by Santal tribes. The Parasnath Hill is situated in Giridih district of Jharkhand. It is a chief Jain pilgrimage site and the holy place for Jains. Additionally, for Santal tribes, their supreme deity Marang Buru is prayed and Jug Jaher is the holy enshrine in its valley where Jaher Ayo being worshiped. It is believed in the Jain culture that 20 of the 24 Tirthankaras attained Moksha from this place. The height of the hill is 1,365 meters.
- Netarhat: Netarhat is a town in Latehar district. Referred to as the "Queen of Chotanagpur", it is a hill station. Netarhat Residential School is located here. Netarhat Dam is also located in this area.
- Rajmahal Hills: These hills are located in Sahibganj and Godda districts of Eastern part of Jharkhand. The Rajmahal hills belong to the Jurassic era. These hills like others also have many waterfalls, lakes and greenery.
- Trikut: Trikut Hill is located ten kilometres away from Deoghar and lies on the way to Dumka in Jharkhand. Trikut hill is also called Trikutchal because there are 3 major peaks on the hill. The height of Trikut hill is 2470 feet.
- Tagore Hill: The Tagore Hill is also recognised as the Morabadi Hill. The Tagore hill is located in Morabadi, Ranchi. The brother of Rabindranath Tagore, Jyotirindranath Tagore had made a tour at Ranchi in the year 1908.

=== Main Rivers ===
- Ganga River: The holy river Ganga passes through the north-eastern district of Sahebganj. Cities on the banks of Ganga river in Jharkhand: Sahebganj, Rajmahal
- Son River: Origin of Son River: Amarkantak, Cities on the Shore of Son River: Sidhi
- Subarnarekha River: Origin of Subarnarekha River: (Nagdi Ranchi) Chota Nagpur Plateau, Cities on the Shore of Subarnarekha River: Ranchi, Chandil, Jamshedpur, Ghatshila, Gopiballavpur
- Kharkai River: Origin of Kharkai River: Mayurbhanj District, Odisha; Cities on the Shore of Kharkai River: Rairangpur, Adityapur, and enters the Subarnarekha river in north-western Jamshedpur.
- Damodar River: Origin of Damodar River: Chota Nagpur Plateau (Tori latehar), Cities on the Shore of Damodar River: latehar, lohardaga, Ramgarh, Gridih, Dhanbad, Bokaro, Asansol, Raniganj, Durgapur, Bardhaman
- North Koel River: Origin of North Koel River: Chota Nagpur plateau, Cities on Shore of North Koel River: Daltonganj
- South Koel River: Origin of South Koyal River: Chota Nagpur Plateau (Nagdi Ranchi), Cities on the Shore of South Koyal River: Manoharpur, Rourkela
- Lilajan River: Also known as Falgu river. Origin of Lilajan River: Northern Chota Nagpur Plateau, City on the Shore: Gaya
- Ajay River: Origin of Ajay River: Munger, Cities on the Shore of Ajay River: Purulia, Chittaranjan, Ilambazar, Jaydev Kenduli
- Mayurakshi River: Origin of Mayurakshi River: Trikut hill, City on the Shore of Mayurakshi River: Suri
- Barakar River: Origin: Padma in Hazaribagh, Barakar Nadi flows through the districts of Koderma, Giridih, Hazaribagh, etc.

For the list of dams built across these revere refer to

=== Flora and Fauna ===
Jharkhand has a rich variety of flora and fauna. The wildlife sanctuaries, national parks and zoological gardens in the state present a panorama of this variety. There are several wildlife sanctuaries and national park in the state, including Hazaribag Wildlife Sanctuary, Dalma Wildlife Sanctuary, Koderma Wildlife Sanctuary, Lawalong Wildlife Sanctuary, Palkot Wildlife Sanctuary, Mahuadanr Wolf Sanctuary, Palamu Tiger Reserve and Betla National Park. Palamu Tiger Reserve reserve is abode to hundreds of species of flora and fauna, as indicated within brackets: mammals (39), snakes (8), lizards (4), fish (6), insects (21), birds (170), seed bearing plants and trees (97), shrubs and herbs (46), climbers, parasites and semi-parasites (25), and grasses and bamboos (17).

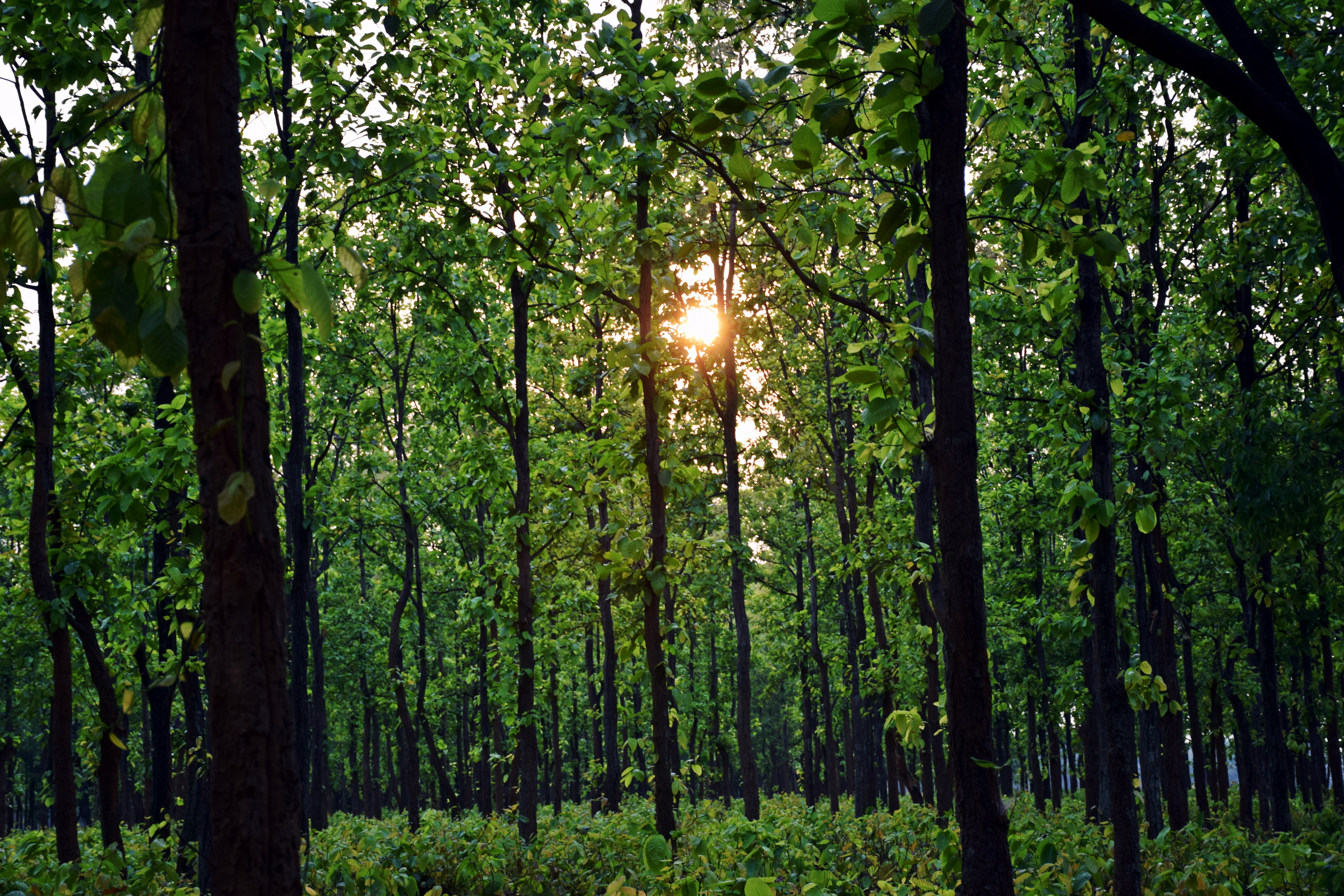
Forest in Jharkhand

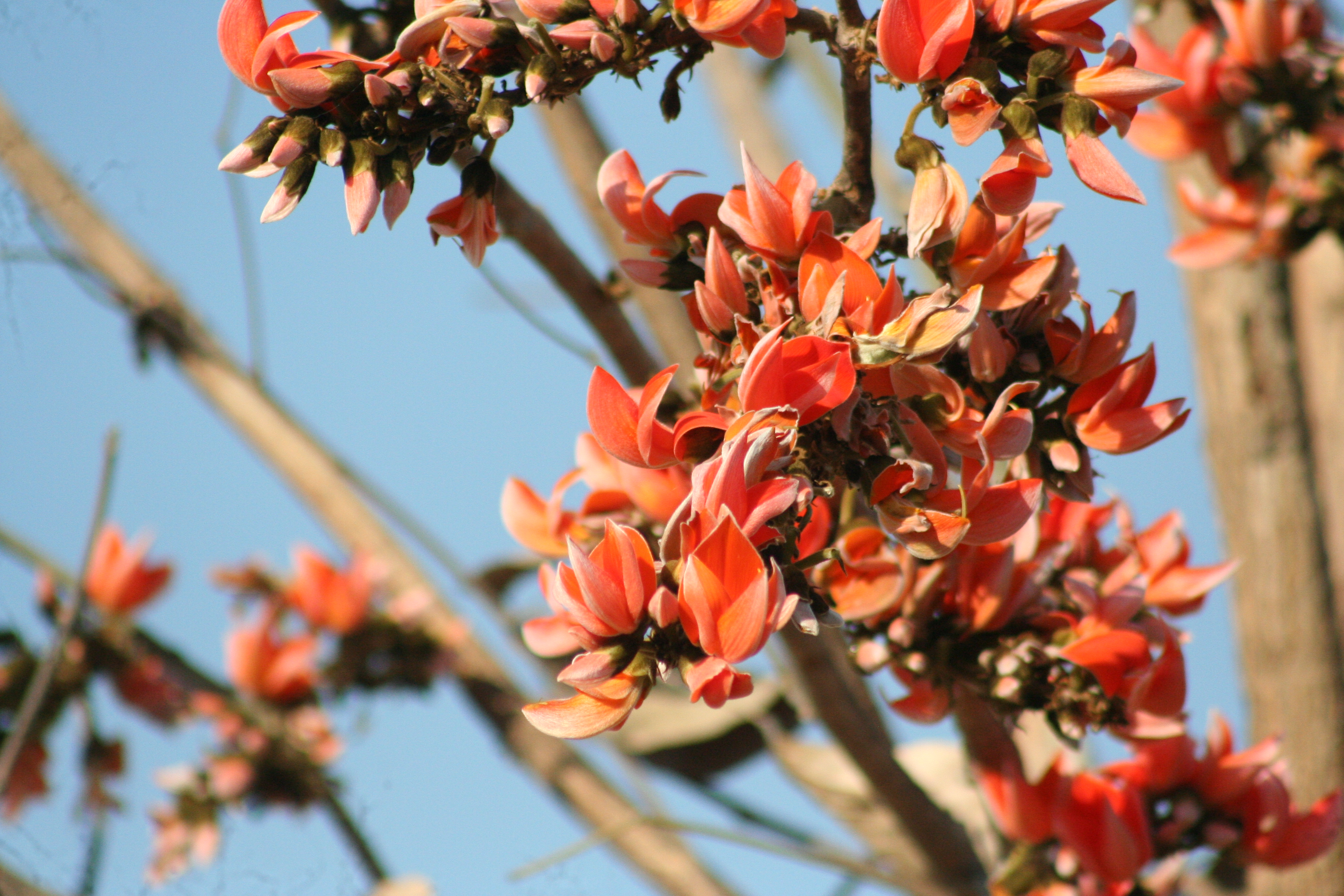
Palash flowers, bright red, pepper the skyline in Jharkhand during fall, also known as forest fire

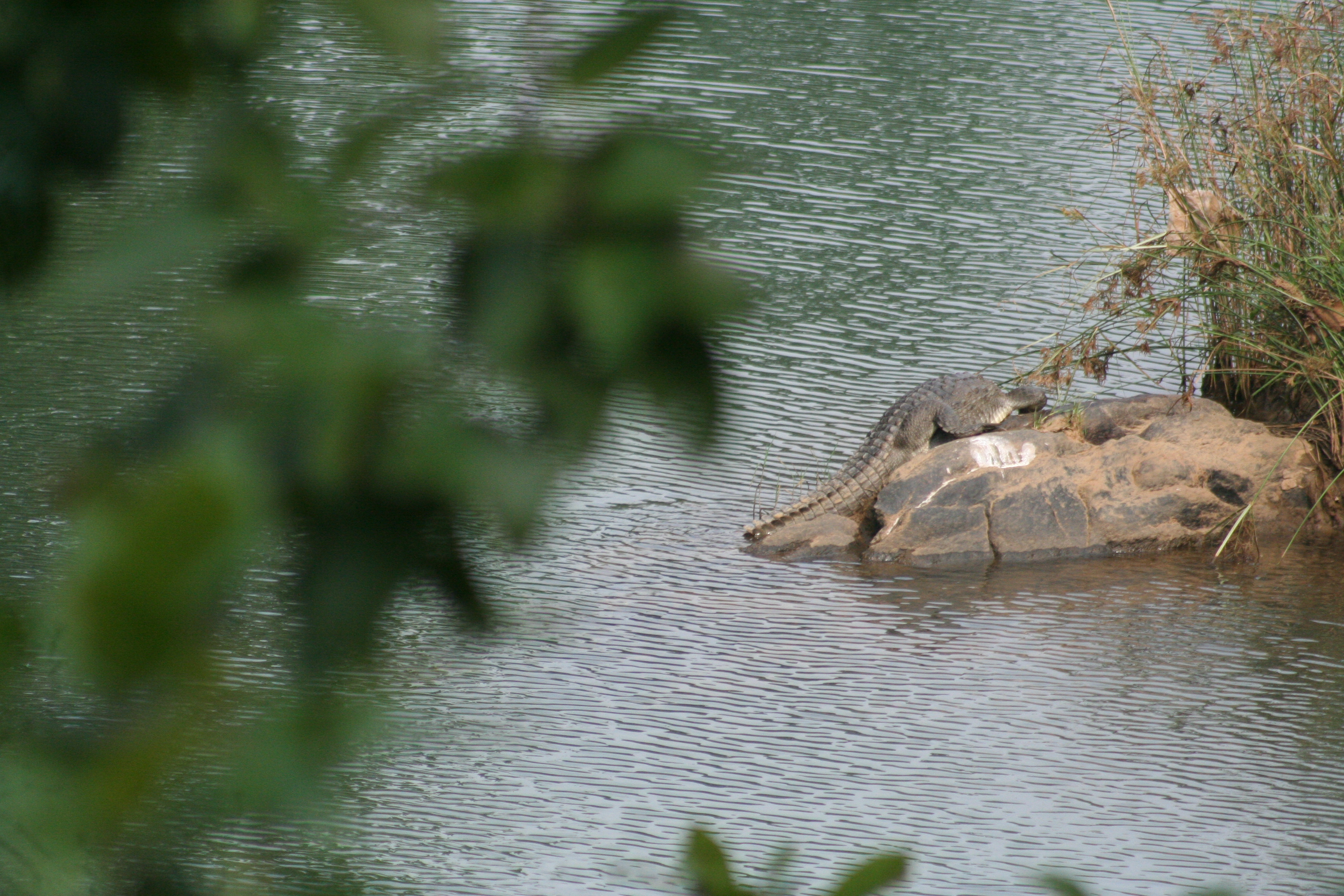
A crocodile at Muta Crocodile Breeding Centre at Ormanjhi, Ranchi

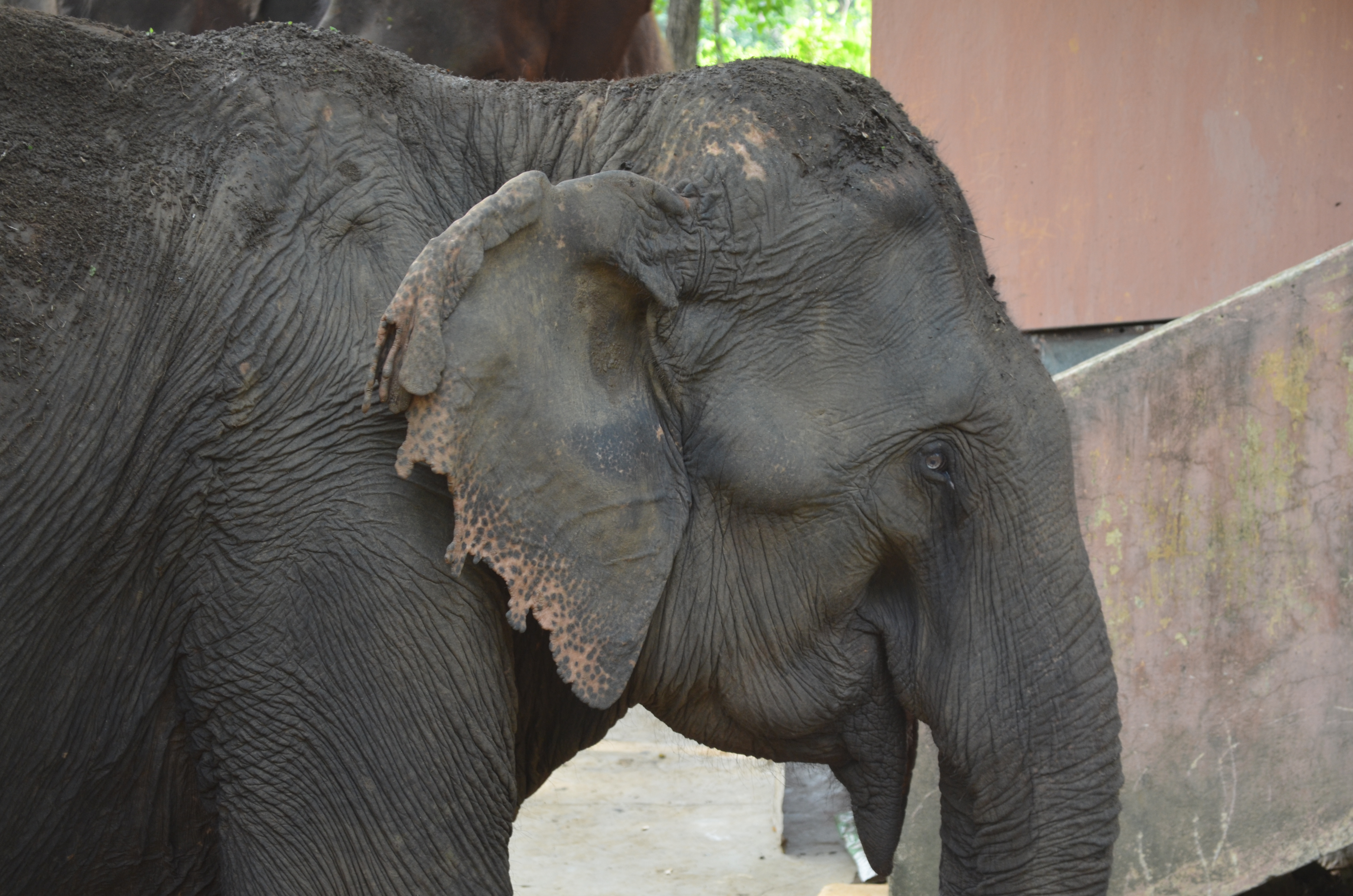
A female Indian elephant at Dalma Wildlife Sanctuary in Jharkhand

== Demographics ==
Historical population
Year	Pop.	±%
1901	6,068,233	—
1911	6,747,122	+11.2%
1921	6,767,770	+0.3%
1931	7,908,737	+16.9%
1941	8,868,069	+12.1%
1951	9,697,254	+9.4%
1961	11,606,489	+19.7%
1971	14,227,133	+22.6%
1981	17,612,069	+23.8%
1991	21,844,911	+24.0%
2001	26,945,829	+23.4%
2011	32,988,134	+22.4%
Source: Census of India

According to the 2011 Indian Census, Jharkhand has a population of 32.96 million, consisting of 16.93 million males and 16.03 million females. The sex ratio is 947 females to 1,000 males. In 2017 The literacy rate of the state was 73.40% with Ranchi district being most educated at 83.13% compared to rural Pakur district being least at 50.17%. In social demographics, Jharkhand's Scheduled Caste and Scheduled Tribes populations are 3,985,644 (12.08%) and 8,646,189 (26.21%), respectively. Nationally, they rank 14th and 6th, comprising 1.98% and 8.29% of the total population within these social groups. They are predominantly concentrated in south-western district Simdega (78.23%), Khunti (77.77%), Gumla (72.11%), Paschim Singhbhum (71.1%), Latehar (66.85%), and in Lohardaga district (60.21%).

=== Languages ===
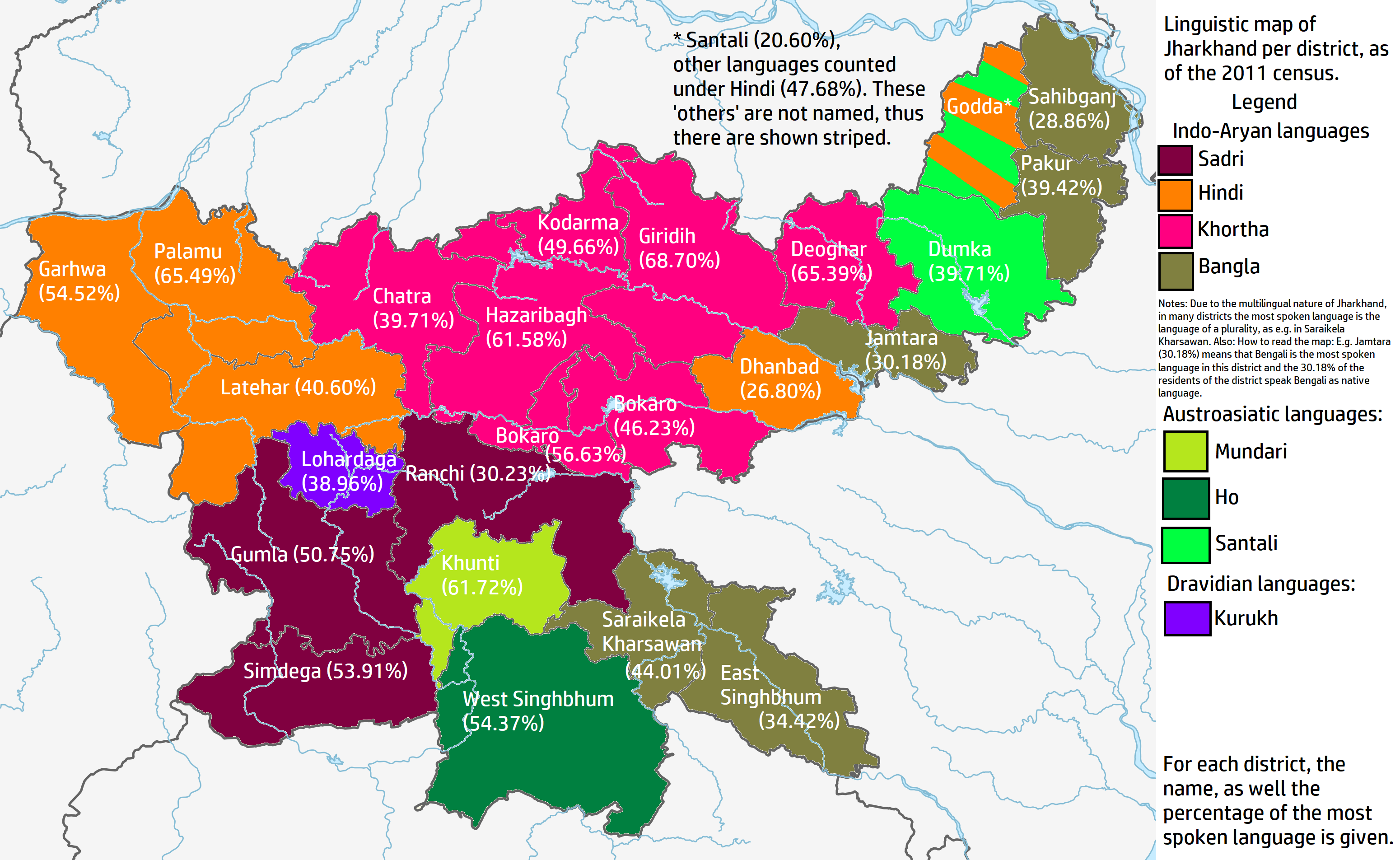
Majority languages spoken by district, 2011 Census

Languages of Jharkhand (2011)
1. Khortha (23.5%)
2. Hindi (21.4%)
3. Bengali (9.74%)
4. Santali (8.77%)
5. Nagpuri (7.23%)
6. Urdu (5.96%)
7. Magahi (4.14%)
8. Ho (3.01%)
9. Mundari (2.92%)
10. Kurukh (2.88%)
11. 'Other' Hindi (Note: Other languages clubbed within the Hindi group of languages by the Indian census) (2.32%)
12. Bhojpuri (2.29%)
13. Kurmali (1.82%)
14. Odia (1.61%)
15. Other (2.45%)

Jharkhand is linguistically diverse, with speakers of Indo-Aryan, Dravidian, and Austroasiatic languages. Hindi is the official language and is spoken as the main language by the people of the state, although different regional languages exist. Some of which, including Nagpuri, Khortha, Kurmali, Magahi and Bhojpuri are categorised as 'Hindi languages' in the 2011 Indian census. Jharkhand has accorded additional official language status to Angika, Bengali, Bhojpuri, Bhumij, Ho, Kharia, Kurukh, Khortha, Kurmali, Magahi, Maithili, Mundari, Nagpuri, Odia, Santali and Urdu.

=== Religion ===
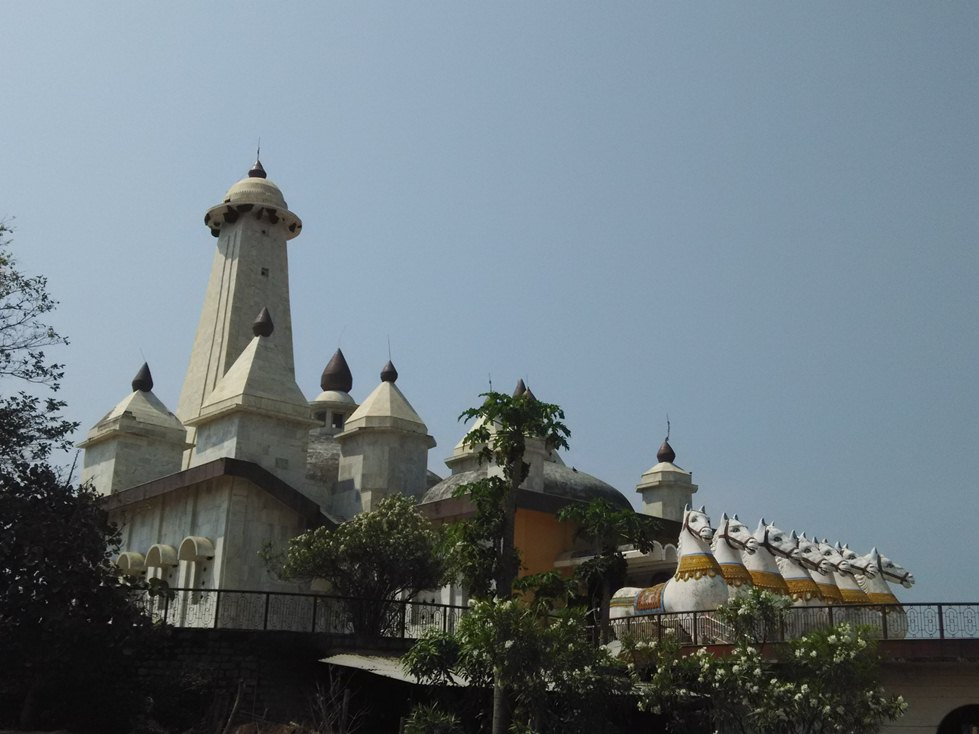
Sun Temple at Ranchi; Hinduism is the majority religion in the state

Religion in Jharkhand (2011)
1. Hinduism (67.8%)
2. Islam (14.5%)
3. Sarnaism (12.5%)
4. Christianity (4.30%)
5. Sikhism (0.22%)
6. Buddhism (0.03%)
7. Jainism (0.05%)
8. Not stated (1.10%)

According to the 2011 Census of India, Hinduism is the largest religion in the state, with 67.8% of the population, followed by Islam (14.5%), Christianity (4.3%), Sikhism (0.2%), Jainism (0.05%), and Buddhism (0.03%). Ethnic religions are also practised by a substantial proportion of the population, the largest being Sarnaism (12.5% or 4,131,282 persons), followed by Addi Bassi (0.1% or 42,422) and Bidin (0.1% or 29,187). Other smaller ethnic faiths include Adi (9,135), Gond/Gondi (2,419), Birsa (2,392), Tana Bhagat (1,107), Santal (1,034), Ho (830), Oraon (797), Sarnam (792), Munda (754), Paharia (537), Kharwar (429), Nature Religion (315), Saranath (304), Parsi/Zoroastrian (188), Krupa (133), and Dupub (122).

Hindus form the majority in 19 out of the 24 districts of the Jharkhand. Christianity forms majority in Simdega district (51.04%). Sarna forms majority in Lohardaga (51.01%), West Singhbhum (62.29%) and plurality in Gumla (44.62%) and Khunti (45.37%). Muslims have the highest presence in Pakur district and Sahebganj district of Jharkhand forming 35% and 34% of the population, respectively.

== Government and administration ==
The constitutional head of the government of Jharkhand is the governor, who is appointed by the president of India. The real executive power rests with the chief minister and the cabinet. The political party or the coalition of political parties having a majority in the Legislative Assembly forms the government.

The head of the bureaucracy of the state is the chief secretary. Under this position, is a hierarchy of officials drawn from the Indian Administrative Service, Indian Police Service, Indian Forest Service and different wings of the state civil services.

The judiciary is headed by the chief justice. Jharkhand has a High Court which has been functioning since the state's formation in 2000. All branches of the government are located in the state capital, Ranchi.

=== Administrative districts ===
The state was formed in 2000 with 18 districts that were formerly part of south Bihar. Some of these districts were reorganised to form 6 new districts, namely, Latehar, Saraikela Kharsawan, Jamtara, Pakur, Khunti and Ramgarh. At present, the state has 5 Divisions and 24 Districts. Interestingly, all of the state's districts, except Lohardaga and Khunti, share a border with a neighbouring state. Each district is administered by a Deputy Commissioner (who also functions as District Collector/District Magistrate), an IAS officer appointed by the government.

For land revenue administration, each district is divided into subdivisions, headed by a Sub Divisional Officer (SDO), and each subdivision again is divided into circles/anchals, headed by Circle Officers (CO).

For development administration, each district is divided into blocks (also known as C.D Blocks), headed by Block Development Officers (BDO). A block consists of several rural subdivisions (panchayats).

=== Divisions and districts ===
- Palamu division
  - Garhwa
  - Palamu
  - Latehar
- North Chotanagpur division
  - Chatra
  - Hazaribag
  - Giridih
  - Koderma
  - Dhanbad
  - Bokaro
  - Ramgarh
- South Chotanagpur division
  - Ranchi
  - Lohardaga
  - Gumla
  - Simdega
  - Khunti
- Kolhan division
  - West Singhbhum
  - Seraikela Kharsawan
  - East Singhbhum
- Santhal Pargana Division
  - Deoghar
  - Jamtara
  - Dumka
  - Godda
  - Pakur
  - Sahebganj

=== Major cities ===
Largest Cities in Jharkhand
(2011 Census of India estimate)

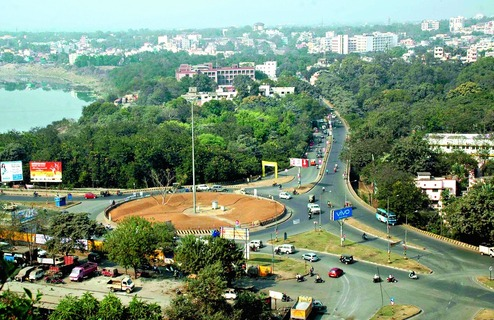
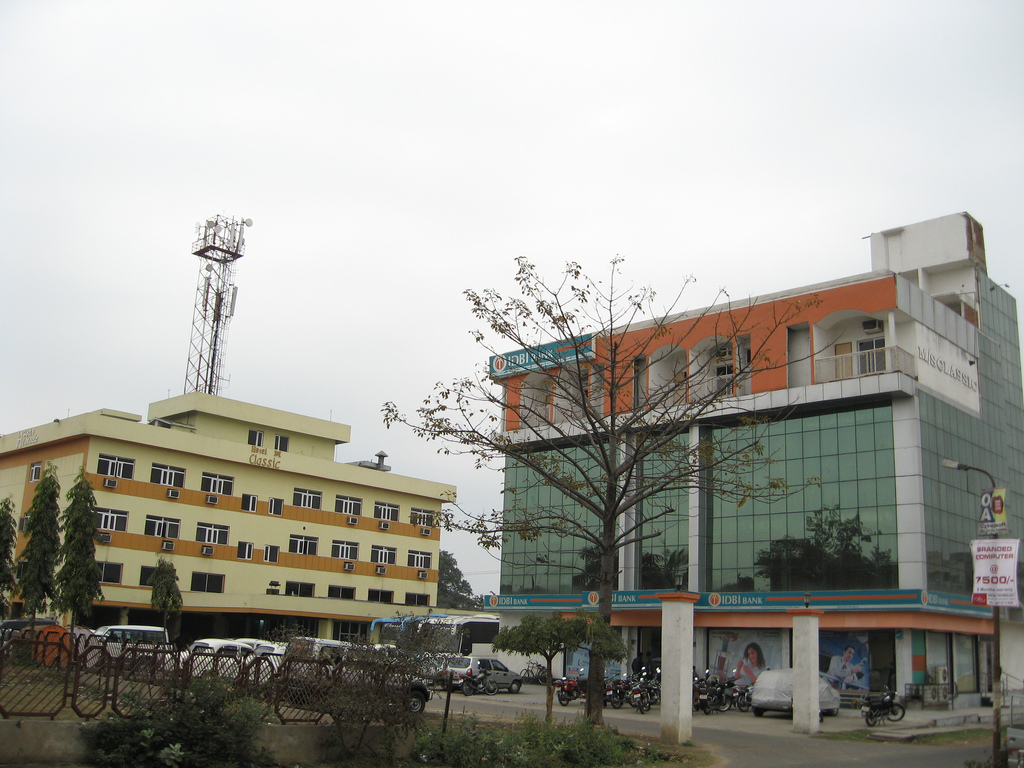
Rank	City	District	Population	Rank	City	District	Population	Jamshedpur Bokaro
01	Jamshedpur	East Singbhum	1,339,438	06	Phusro	Bokaro	186,139	Jamshedpur Bokaro
02	Dhanbad	Dhanbad	1,196,214	07	Hazaribagh	Hazaribagh	153,595	Jamshedpur Bokaro
03	Ranchi	Ranchi	1,126,741	08	Giridih	Giridih	143,630	Jamshedpur Bokaro
04	Bokaro Steel City	Bokaro	564,319	09	Ramgarh	Ramgarh	132,441	Jamshedpur Bokaro
05	Deoghar	Deoghar	203,123	10	Medininagar	Palamu	120,325	Jamshedpur Bokaro

== Economy ==
The gross domestic product of Jharkhand is estimated at ₹6.25 lakh crore (US$67 billion) in 2026–27. The per capita GDP of Jharkhand in 2026-27 was ₹189,422 (US$2,000).

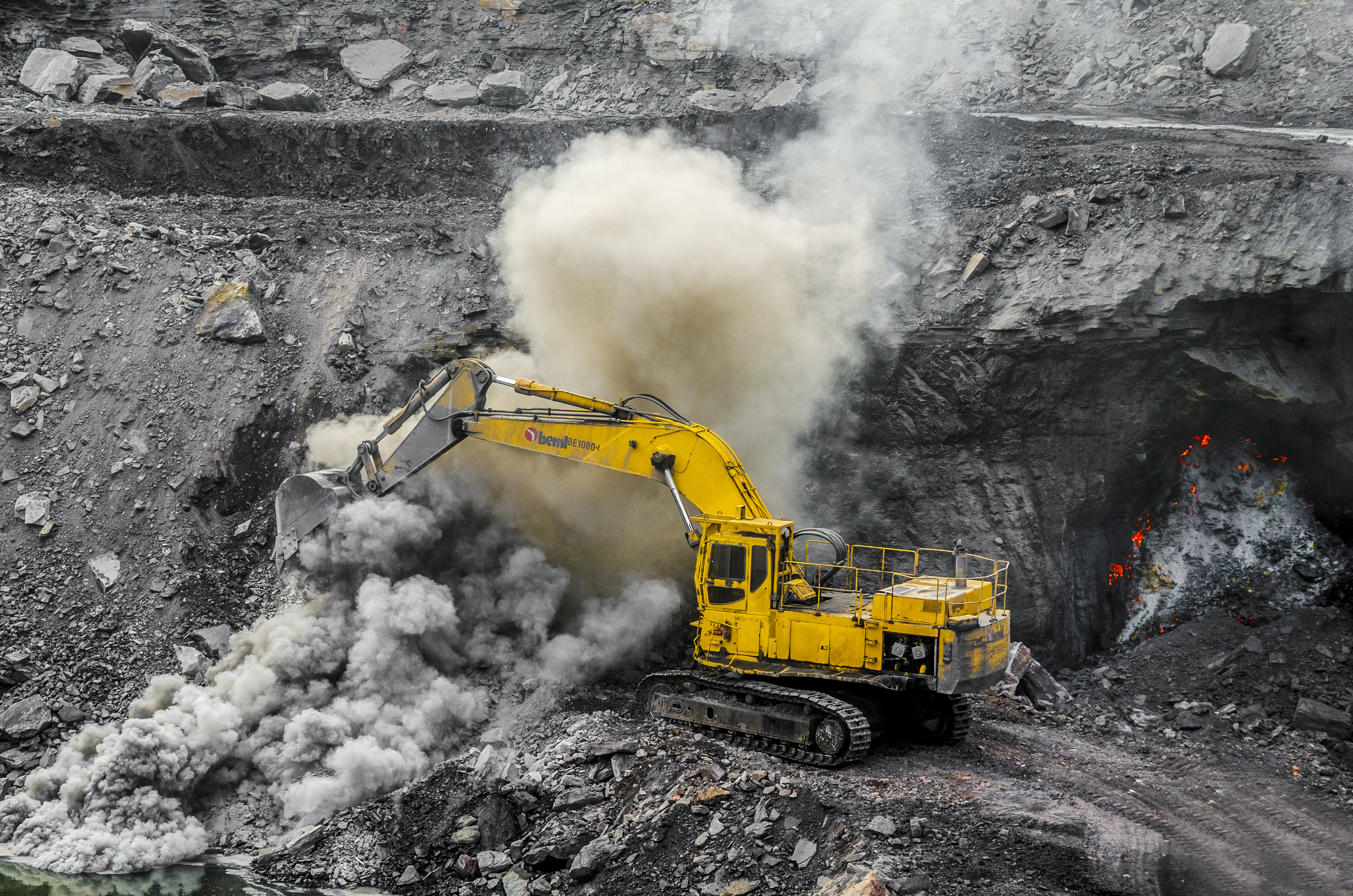
Open-cast coal mining in Dhanbad

Jharkhand has several towns and innumerable villages with civic amenities. Urbanization ratio is 24.1%. Jharkhand also has immense mineral resources: minerals ranging from (ranking in the country within bracket) from iron ore (4th), coal (3rd), copper ore (1st), mica (1st), bauxite (3rd), manganese, limestone, china clay, fire clay, graphite (8th), kainite (1st), chromite (2nd), asbestos (1st), thorium (3rd), sillimanite, uranium (Jaduguda mines, Narwa Pahar) (1st) and even gold (Rakha Mines) (6th) and silver and several other minerals. Large deposits of coal and iron ore support concentration of industry, in centres like Jamshedpur, Dhanbad, Bokaro and Ranchi. Tata Steel, a NSE NIFTY 500 conglomerate has its corporate office and main plant in Tatanagar, Jharkhand. It reported a gross income of ₹. 204,910 million for 2005. NTPC will start coal production from its captive mine in state in 2011–12, for which the company will be investing about Rs 18 billion.

In February 2006, the government of Jharkhand established the Jharkhand Silk Textile and Handicraft Development Corporation (Jharcraft), which promotes local sericulture and weaving and the wider marketing of these products.

Agriculture is another major economic sector. Farmers in Jharkhand produce several crops such as rice, wheat, maize, pulses, potatoes, and vegetables such as tomato, carrots, cabbage, brinjal, pumpkin, and papaya. Other important industries include the cottage industry and IT.

== Culture ==
=== Cuisine ===
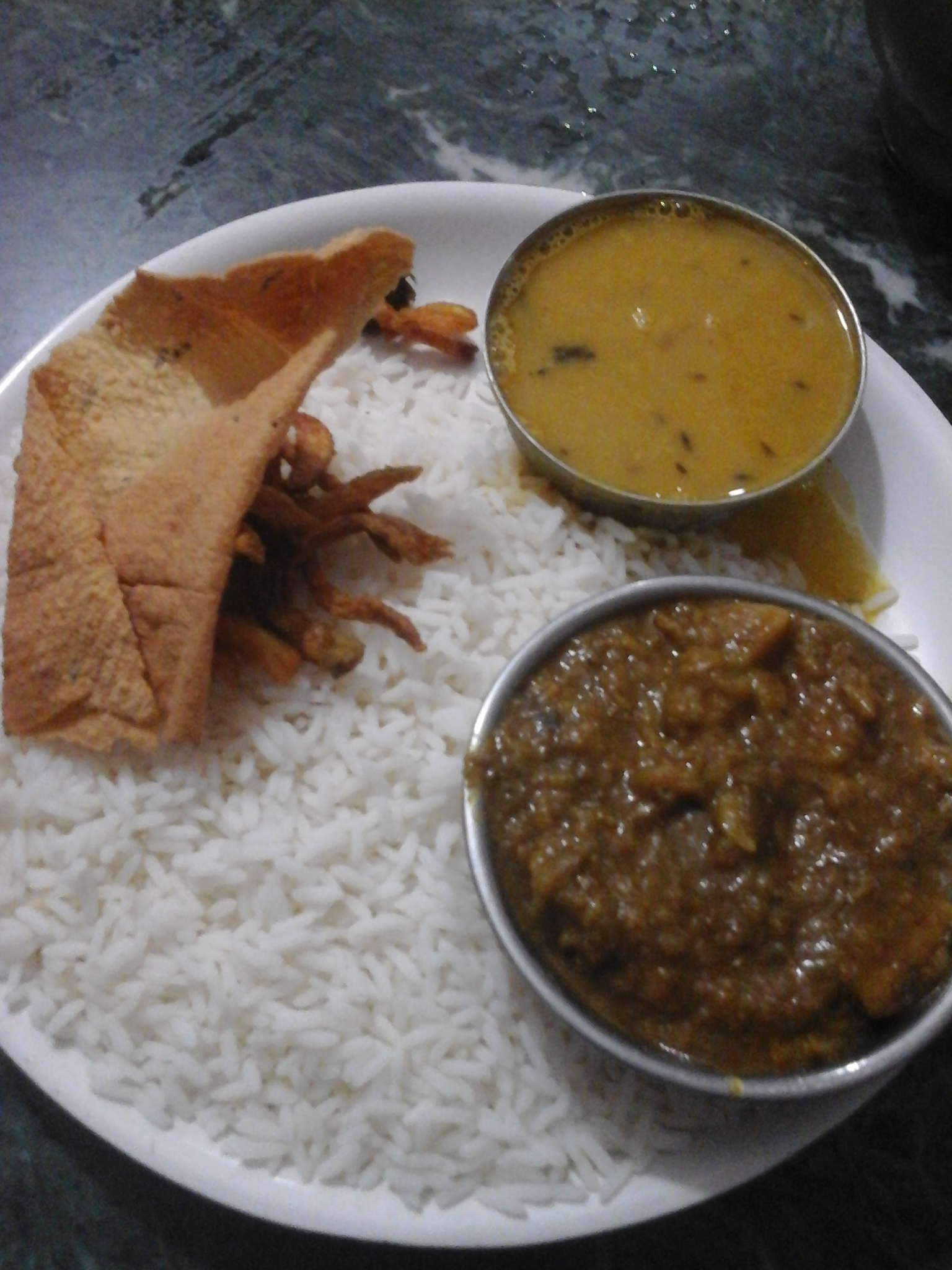
A Jharkhand Rice Plate

Staple foods of Jharkhand are rice, dal, roti, vegetables, and tubers. Spices are sparingly used in cuisine. Famous dishes include Chhilka Roti, Malpua, Pitha, Dhooska, Arsa roti, Dudhauri, and Panipuri (Gupchup). Rugra and Putoo is a type of edible mushroom that is grown extensively in Jharkhand and harvested during the rainy months. It has a hardened, white, edible shell and a softer dark coloured centre. Bamboo shoot are a versatile ingredient used in many culinary traditions, particularly in Jharkhand cuisine. They can be boiled, steamed, stir-fried, or pickled, making them a popular addition to dishes such as soups, curries, and salads. Bamboo shoots are known for their ability to absorb the flavours of the ingredients they are cooked with, enhancing the overall taste of the dishes. The leaves of Munga (Moringa oleifera) and Koinar (Bauhinia variegata) trees are used as a leafy vegetable or Saag.

Local alcoholic drinks include rice beer, originally known as Handi or Handia, named after the vessel, handi (earthen pot), used to make it. Handia is culturally associated with natives, i.e., Sadans and Tribals; this drink is consumed by both men and women on social occasions like marriage and festivals. Another common liquor is called Mahua daru, made from flowers of the Mahua tree (Madhuca longifolia).

=== Folk music and dance ===
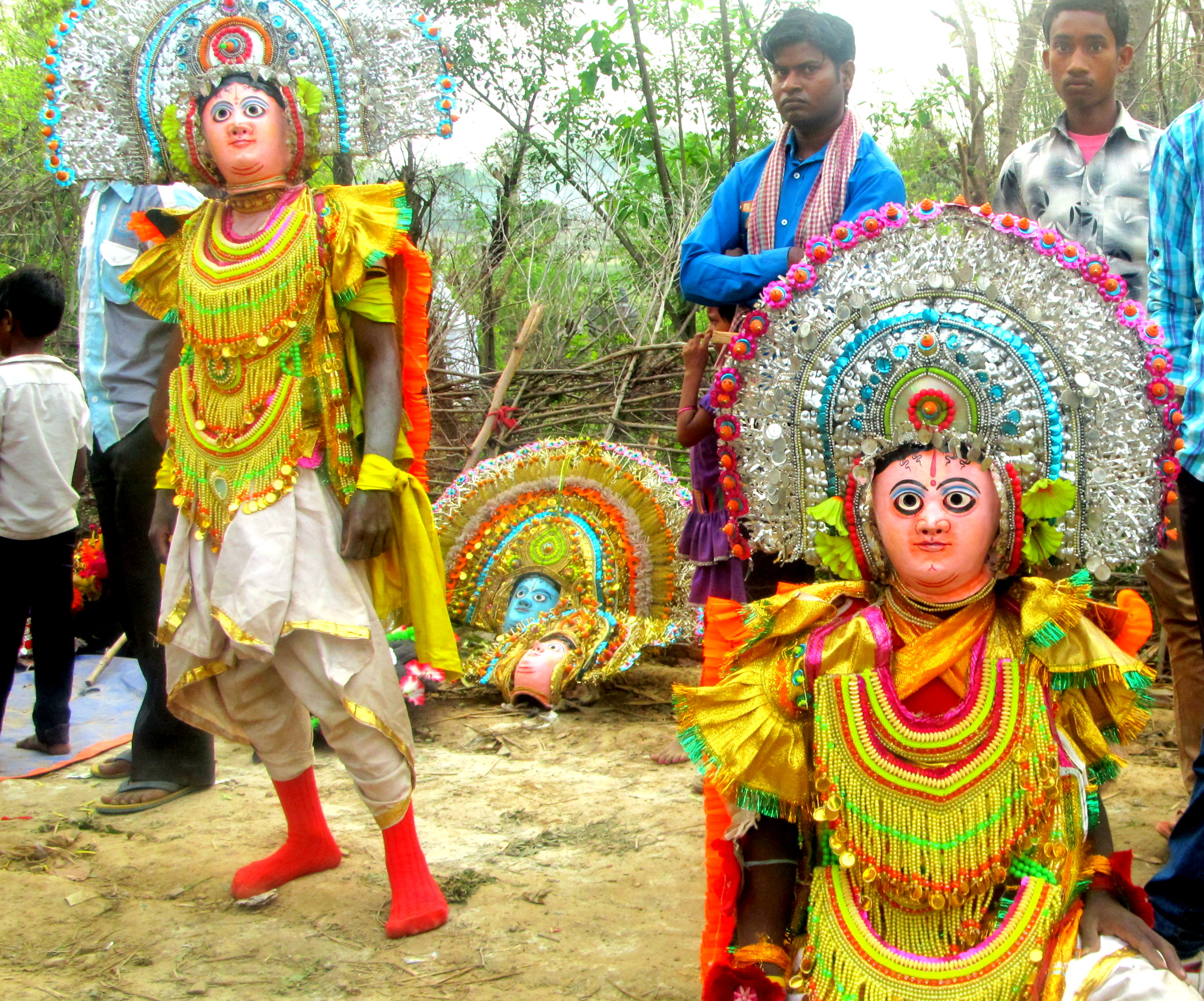
Chhau Dancers in Jharkhand village

There are several folk dances in Jharkhand such as: Jhumair, Mardani Jhumar, Janani Jhumar, Domkach, Vinsariya, Jhumta, Fagua, Angnai, Paiki, Chhau, Firkal, Mundari, and Santali dance.

=== Festivals ===
Major festivals of Jharkhand are Sarhul, Baha parab, Karam Parab, Mage Parab, Sohrai, Bandna, Tusu Festival, Makar Sankranti, Nawakhani, Durga Puja, Kali Puja, Jitiya, Manasa Puja, Rath Yatra, Saraswati Puja, Diwali, Holi, Phagua and the Sendra festival.

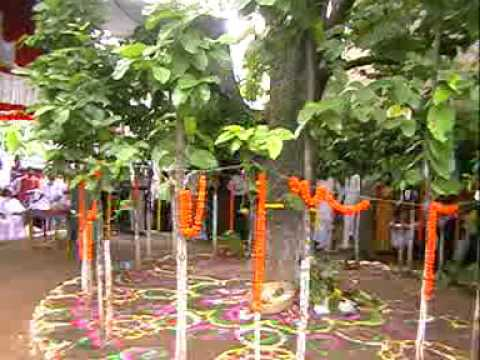
Karam festival in Jharkhand

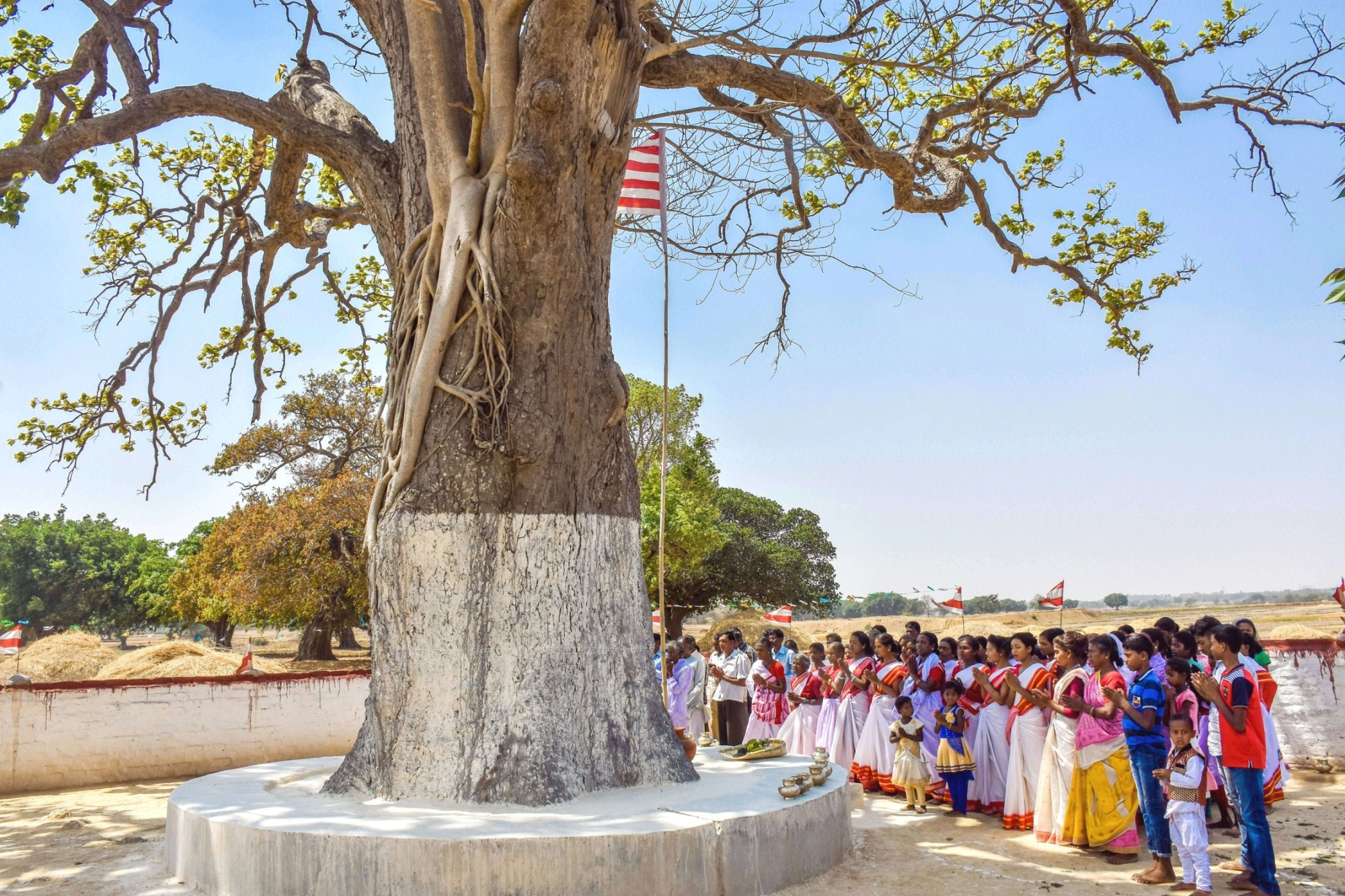
Sarhul in Jharkhand

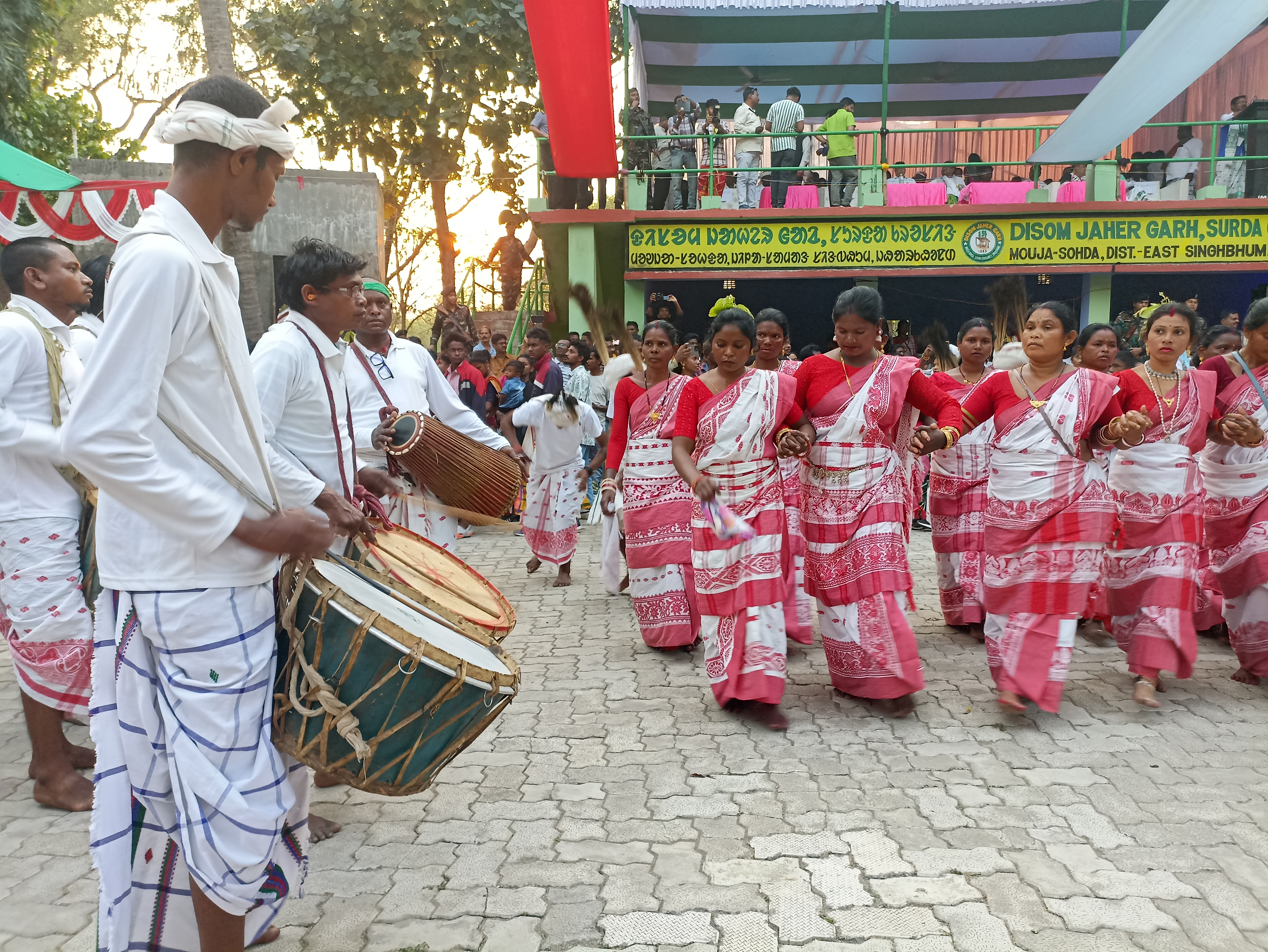
Baha Parab in Jharkhand

Durga Puja celebration in Ranchi, Jharkhand

An idol of Goddess Kali worshipped during Kali Puja in Madhupur, Jharkhand

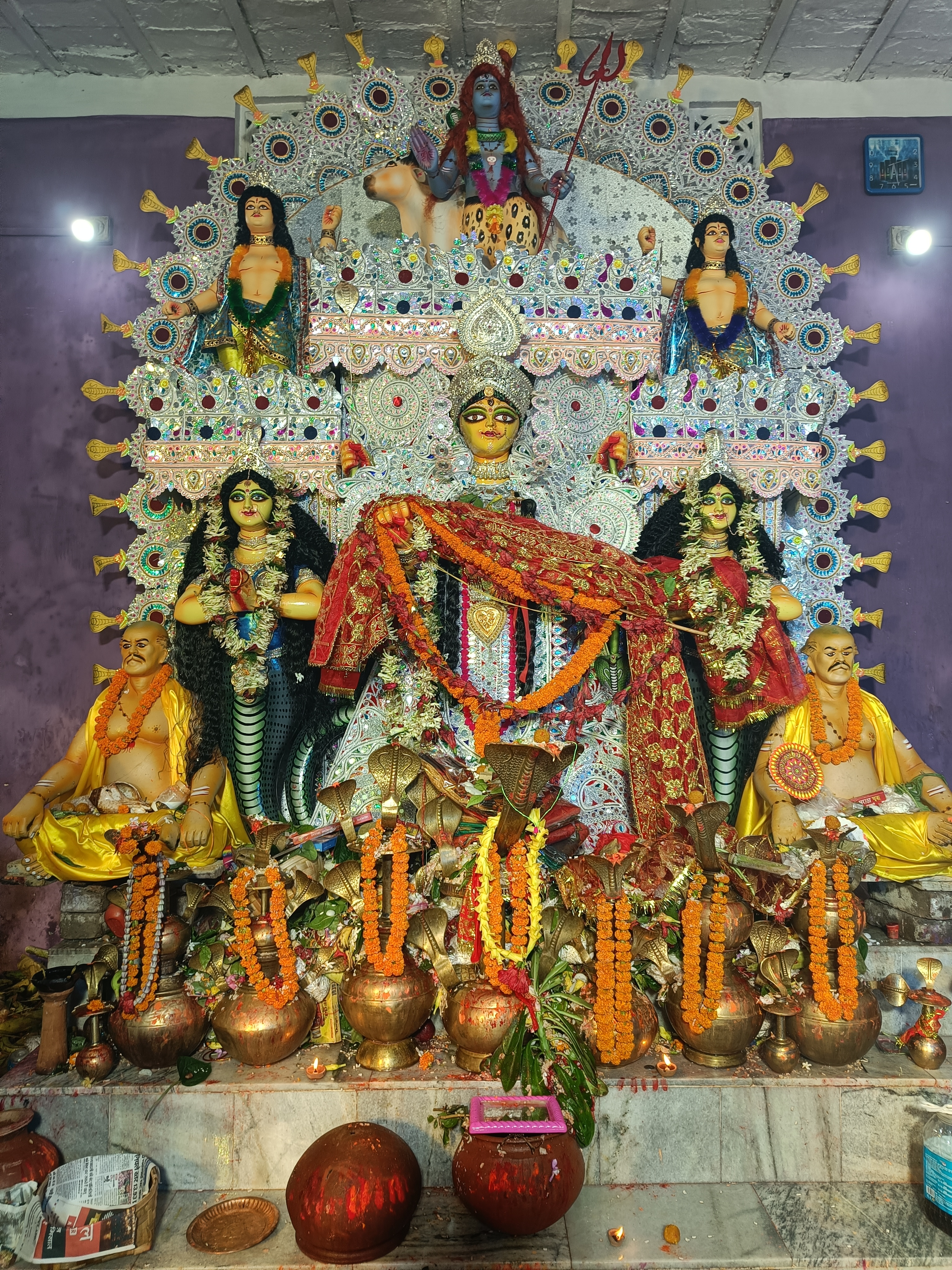
Manasa Puja in Jharkhand

=== Paintings ===
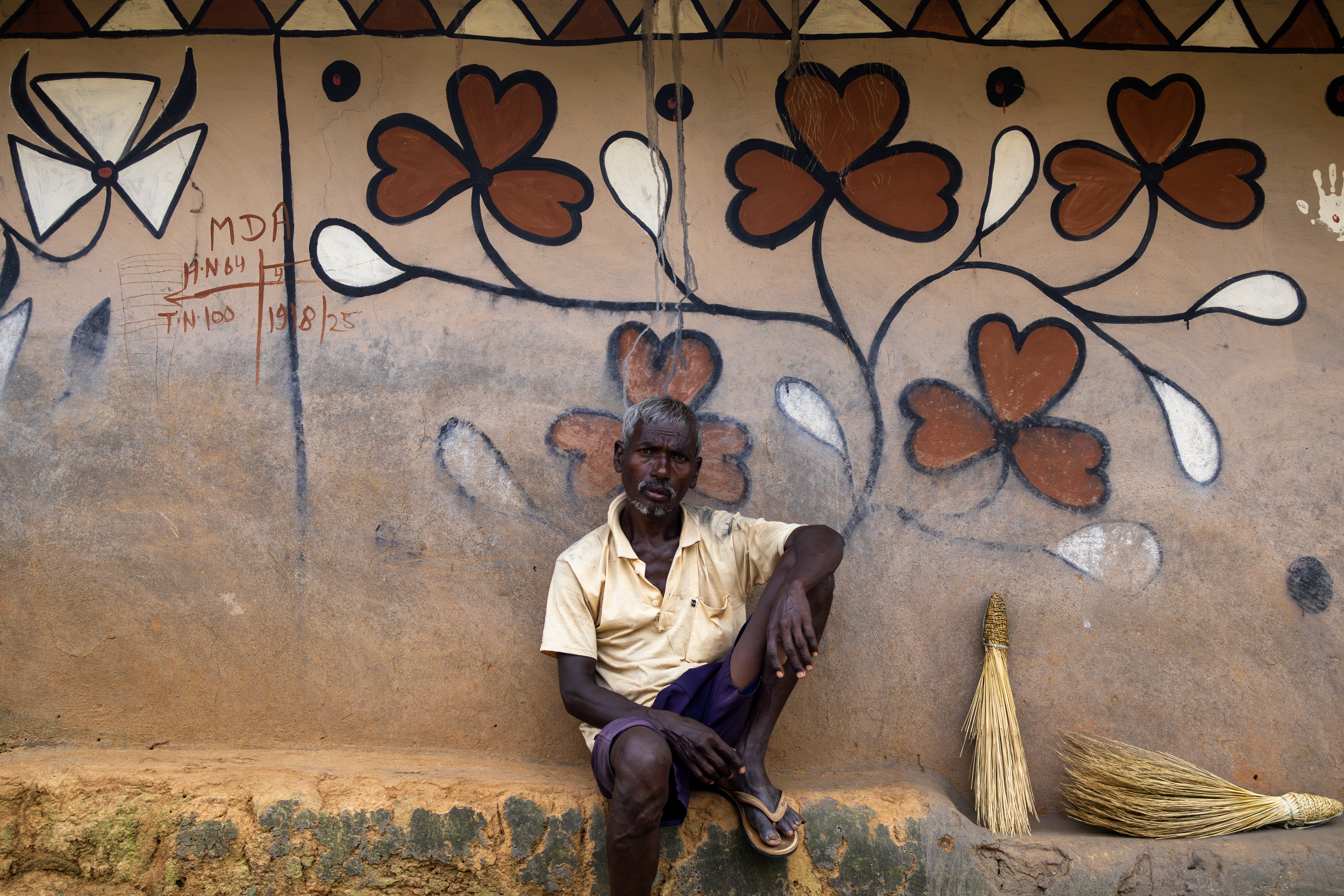
Sohrai wall painting at Isko Village, Hazaribagh district, Jharkhand

Sohrai and Khovar painting is a mural art form practised by women. Sohrai painting is traditionally done at the Sohrai harvest festival, while Khovar painting is done at weddings.

=== Tattoo ===
The tattoo making tradition of Godna is an essential part of local tradition.

=== Cinema ===
Jharkhand produces many films in regional and Tribal languages including Nagpuri, Khortha, Santali, Ho, and Kurukh. The film industry in the state of Jharkhand is known as Jhollywood.

== Media ==
There are some television channels, newspapers, and radio stations which operate in Jharkhand. DD Jharkhand is an important channel in Jharkhand. All India Radio operates from Ranchi.

Hindustan, Dainik Jagran, Sokal Sokal, Prabhat Khabar, and Ranchi Express are some of the Hindi newspapers and The Hindu, The Times of India, Hindustan Times, Navbharat Times, The Pioneer, and The Telegraph are some English newspapers in Jharkhand.

== Transport ==
=== Airways ===
- Birsa Munda Airport is the largest domestic airport in the state with air connectivity to major Indian cities of Delhi, Kolkata, Bangalore, Mumbai, Hyderabad among others.
- Deoghar Airport is the second busiest airport located in the state of Jharkhand, India. It is the second operational airport in state of Jharkhand after Ranchi.
- Sonari Airport at Jamshedpur is the third operational airport in the state and it has daily flight to Bhubaneswar and Kolkata.
- Bokaro Airport is under Steel Authority of India Limited and 4th operational airport of the state. It is being developed under UDAN scheme.
- Other airports present in the state are Chakulia Airport, Dumka Airport, Giridih Airport, Dhalbhumgarh Airport and Dhanbad Airport which mostly run private and charter flights.

=== Roadways ===
Jharkhand has extensive network of National Highways and State Highways. There is 2,661.83 km (1,653 mi 1,733 yd) of paved National Highways in the state as of 2016. The National highways present in the state are numbered 18, 19, 20, 22, 33, 39, 43, 114A, 118, 133, 133A, 133B, 139, 143, 143A, 143AG, 143D, 143H, 218, 220, 320, 320D, 320G, 333, 333A, 343, 419 and 522. The Golden Quadrilateral network of Delhi – Kolkata route runs through Jharkhand notably at Dhanbad.

=== Ports ===
Jharkhand is landlocked state but has numerous rivers and waterways. A multi-modal port has been planned at Sahebganj where river Ganges flows. The project is estimated to cost ₹65,000 million and phase-1 is estimated to be completed by 2019.

=== Railways ===
Jharkhand is very well connected by railways. The state has numerous railway stations and railway junctions. Dhanbad Junction is the largest railway station in the state which is connected to almost all big cities of India. Hilly regions of state are equipped with tunnels that form essential organ of railways.

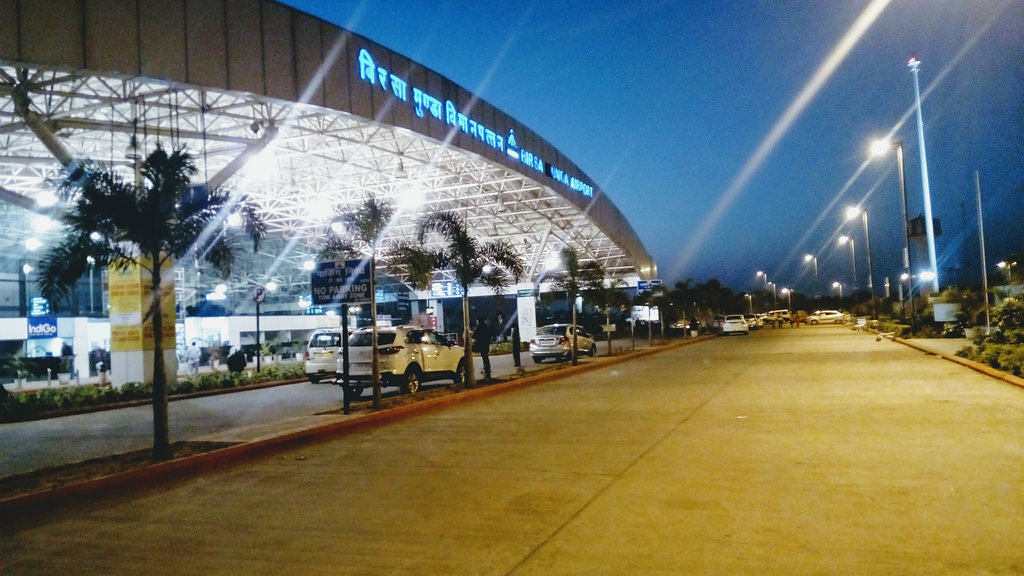
Ranchi Airport (IXR)

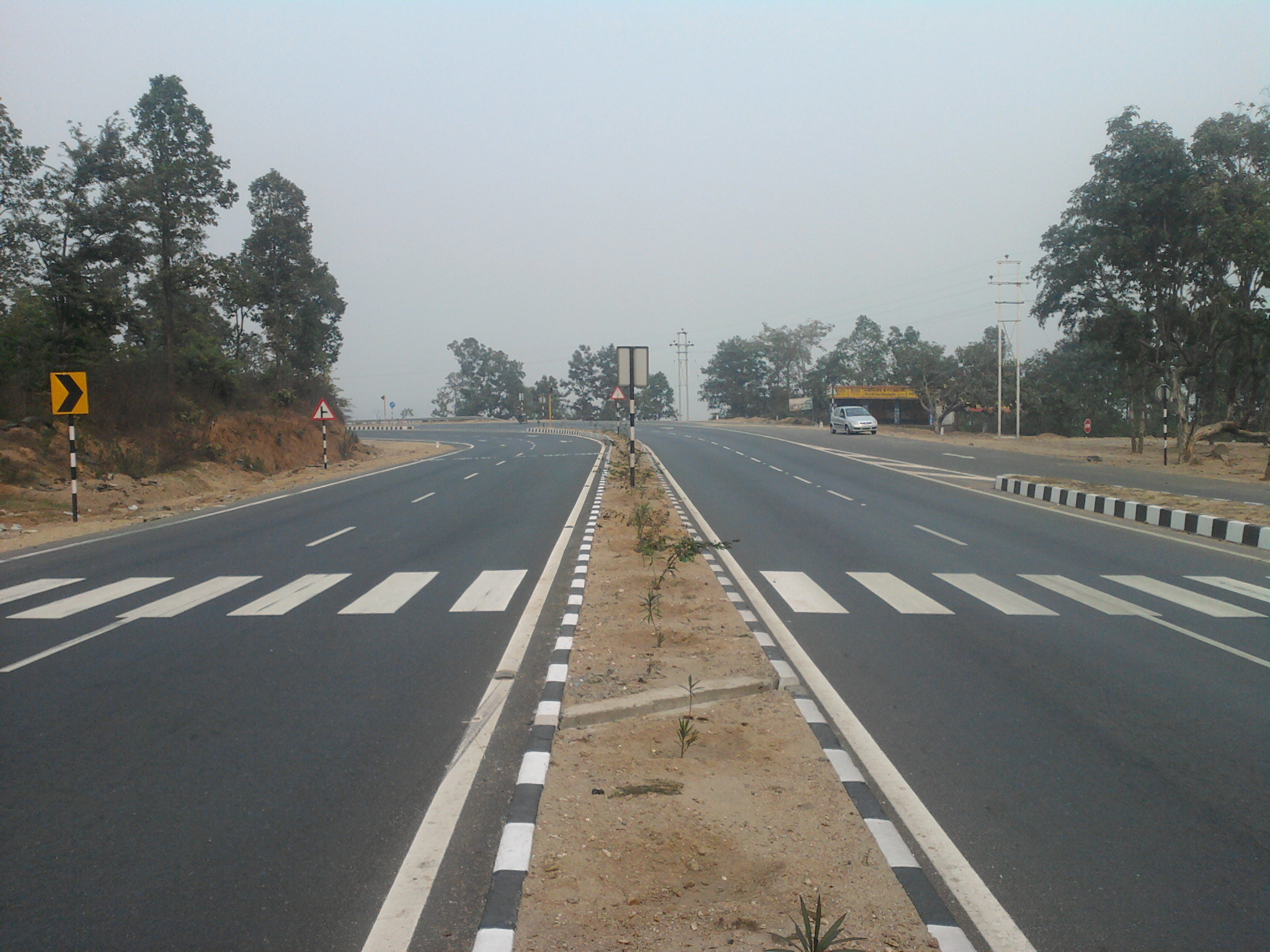
National Highway 20 near Ramgarh Cantonment

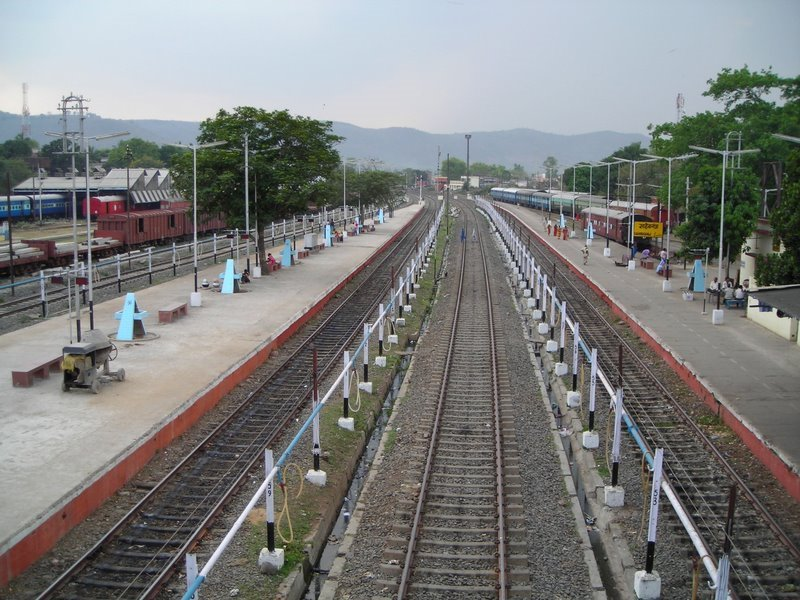
View from the Sahibganj Railway Station

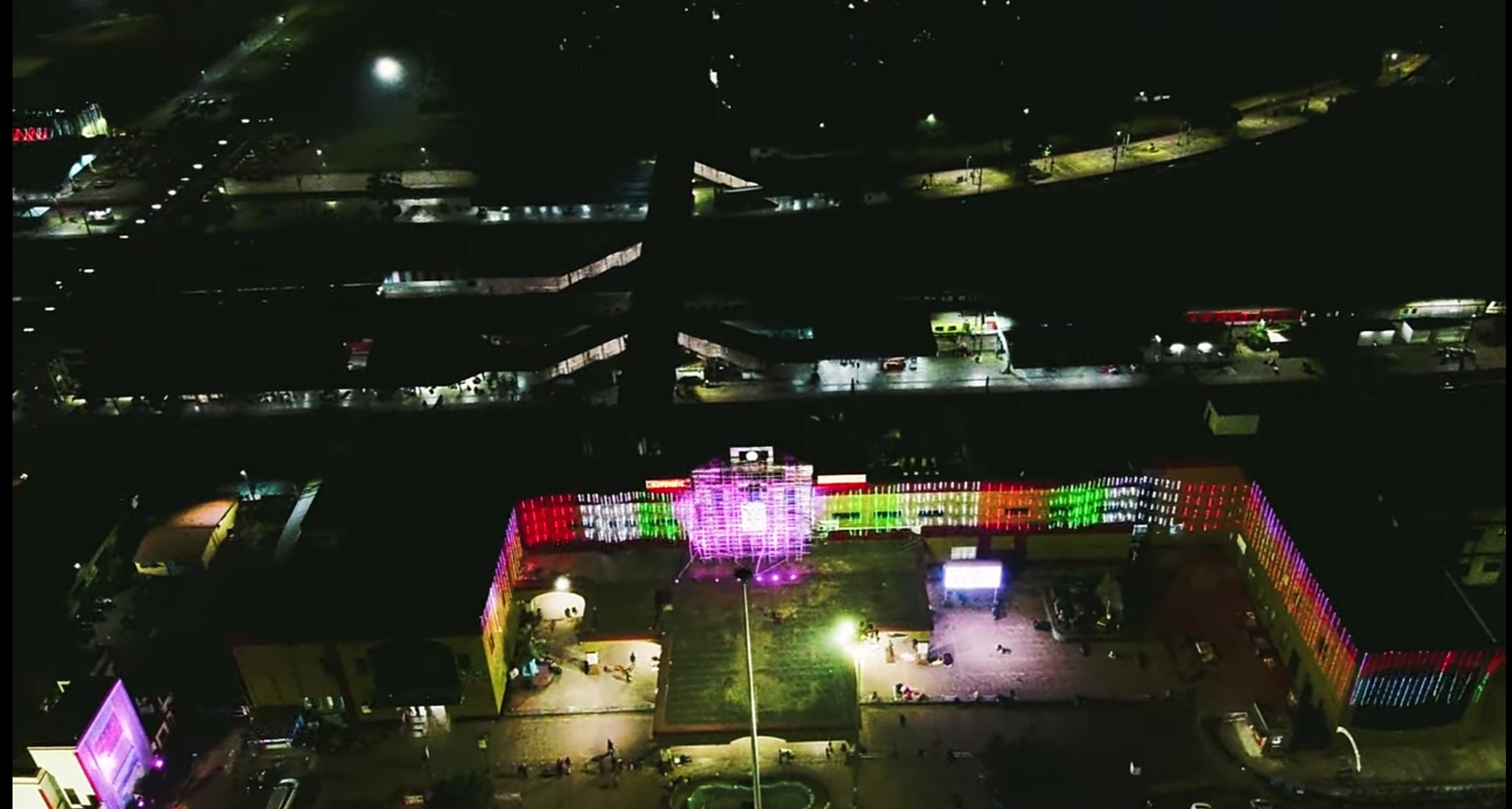
Night View of Dhanbad Junction railway station. (Largest Railway Station in Jharkhand)

== Education ==
As per the 2011 census conducted by Government of India the official literacy rate for the state was 66.41% (male: 76.84%; female: 55.42%) with nine districts above the average literacy rate:

- Ranchi: 76.06% (male: 84.26%; female: 67.44%)
- East Singhbhum: 75.49% (male: 83.75%; female: 66.81%)
- Dhanbad: 74.52% (male: 83.81%; Female: 64.29%)
- Ramgarh: 73.17% (male: 82.44%; female: 63.09%)
- Bokaro: 72.01% (male: 82.51%; female: 60.63%)
- Hazaribagh: 69.75% (male: 80.01%; female: 58.95%)
- Simdega: 67.99% (male: 76.08%; female: 59.92%)
- Saraikela Khasawan: 67.70% (male: 79.03%; female: 55.88%)
- Lohardaga: 67.61% (male: 77.21%; female: 57.69%)
- Koderma: 66.84% (male: 79.78%; female: 53.23%)

Since the formation of the new state, the Jharkhand Education Project Council (JEPC) has been implementing four projects to spread elementary education: DPEP, SSA, NPEGEL, and KGBV. The state has been moving towards the goal of universal elementary education but the target of 100% enrolment and retention of children in schools has not yet been attained. Jharkhand has made primary education so accessible that 95% of children of ages 6–11 are enrolled in school, as opposed to 56% in 1993–94; this will likely improve literacy a great deal.

=== Schools ===
The medium of instruction in schools is Hindi/English with English/Hindi/Sanskrit/Bengali/Odia as second language. After 10 years of schooling, students can join two years of Intermediate course (or +2 courses) in Arts, Science and Commerce. This is followed by three years of degree courses (graduation) or four years of Engineering/Agriculture/Medicine degree.

The school system comprises various private and public schools. The government schools are abundant. Few notable schools are: St. Thomas School, Ranchi, Sainik School Tilaiya, Loyola School, Jamshedpur, Delhi Public School, Bokaro, Delhi Public School, Ranchi, Bishop Westcott Boys' School, Ramakrishna Mission Vidyapith, Deoghar, De Nobili School and St. Xavier's School, Hazaribagh.

In 2009 Franz Gastler established Yuwa School a NGO in Hutup village in Ranchi district with helps of friends to use football as a platform to combat child marriage, illiteracy and human trafficking in rural India. In 2019, It won the Laureus Sport for Good Award.

=== Universities and colleges ===
- AISECT University, Jharkhand, Hazaribagh
- Arka Jain University, Jamshedpur
- Binod Bihari Mahto Koyalanchal University, Dhanbad
- Birsa Agricultural University, Kanke, Ranchi
- Central University of Jharkhand, Brambe, Ranchi
- Jharkhand Raksha Shakti University, Ranchi
- Kolhan University, Chaibasa
- National University of Study and Research in Law, Ranchi
- Nilamber-Pitamber University, Medininagar
- Ranchi University, Ranchi
- Sarala Birla University, Ranchi
- Sido Kanhu Murmu University, Dumka
- Vinoba Bhave University, Hazaribagh
- Usha Martin University, Ranchi

==== Autonomous ====
- Dr. Shyama Prasad Mukherjee University, formerly Ranchi college
- Indian Institute of Information Technology, Ranchi
- Indian Institute of Management Ranchi
- Indian Institute of Technology (Indian School of Mines), Dhanbad
- Jharkhand University of Technology
- National Institute of Foundry and Forge Technology (NIFFT), Ranchi
- National University of Study and Research in Law
- National Institute of Technology, Jamshedpur
- St. Xavier's College, Ranchi
- Xavier Institute of Social Service (XISS), Ranchi
- Xavier Labour Relations Institute (XLRI), Jamshedpur

==== Agriculture ====
- Indian Institute of Agricultural Biotechnology, Ranchi
- College of Horticulture, West Singhbhum

==== Engineering ====
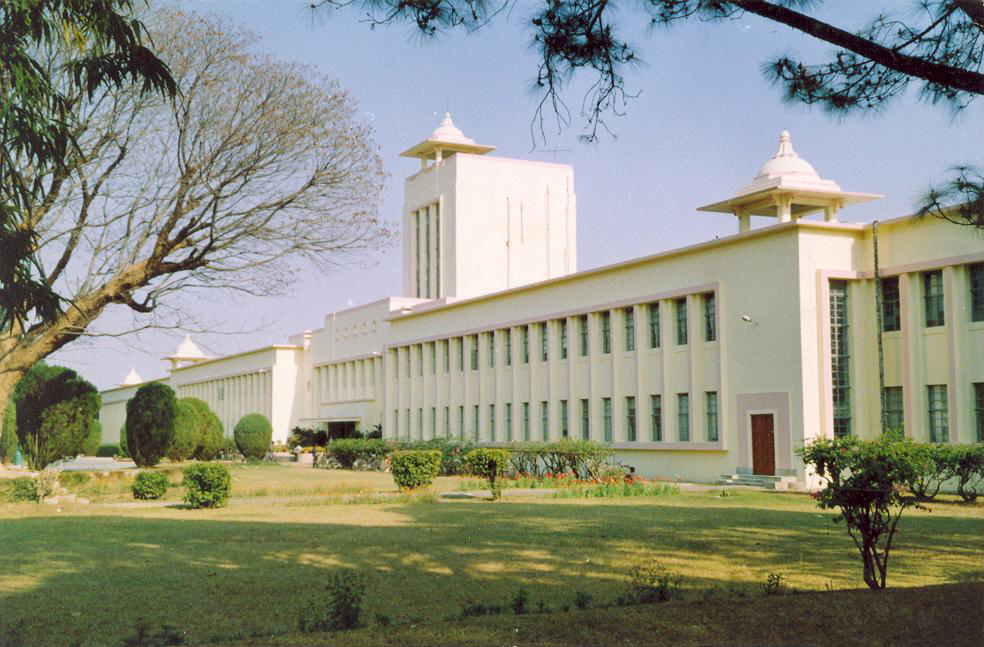
Birla Institute of Technology, Mesra, Ranchi

- Birla Institute of Technology, Mesra, Ranchi
- Birsa Institute of Technology, Sindri, Dhanbad
- Chaibasa Engineering College
- DAV Institute of Engineering and Technology, Daltonganj
- Dumka Engineering College
- Government Engineering College, Palamu
- Indian Institute of Technology (Indian School of Mines), Dhanbad, Dhanbad
- National Institute of Advanced Manufacturing Technology (NIFFT), Ranchi
- National Institute of Technology, Jamshedpur
- Ramgarh Engineering College

==== Management ====
- Indian Institute of Management Ranchi IIM-Ranchi
- XLRI - Xavier School of Management, Jamshedpur
- NSIBM - Netaji Subhas Institute of Hotel & Business Management, Jamshedpur

==== Medical colleges ====
- All India Institute of Medical Sciences (AIIMS), Deoghar
- Hazaribag College of Dental Sciences and Hospital, Hazaribagh
- Medini Rai Medical College and Hospital, Palamu, Palamu
- Phulo Jhano Murmu Medical College and Hospital, Dumka
- Rajendra Institute of Medical Sciences (RIMS), Ranchi
- Shaheed Nirmal Mahto Medical College, Dhanbad, Dhanbad
- Shaheed Sheikh Bhikhari Medical College and Hospital, Hazaribagh

==== Psychiatry ====
- Central Institute of Psychiatry, Ranchi

== Public health ==
Because of its mild climate, Jharkhand, particularly its capital Ranchi, has been a health resort. As far back as 1918, facilities were set up for treatment of mentally challenged.

European Mental Hospital was established along with Indian Mental Hospital. Today they are called Central Institute of Psychiatry and Ranchi Institute of Neuro-psychiatry and Allied Sciences respectively. In certain areas of Jharkhand, poverty and consequent malnutrition have given rise to diseases like tuberculosis (TB). In fact, TB has assumed epidemic proportions in certain areas of the state. For management and treatment of such TB, Itki TB Sanatorium, Ranchi, established in 1928 has been doing work as a premier institute for clinical and programmatic management of TB. The Itki TB Sanatorium is well equipped and accredited by the Indian government for quality assurance and Culture and Drug Sensitivity Testing for M.TB. It provides free of cost treatment for TB as well as drug-resistant TB. Likewise, in the field of treatment of cancer, Tata Main Hospital, Jamshedpur, is rendering pioneering work. In the same way, Bokaro General Hospital equipped with modern facilities for the treatment of cancer and heart-related problems with the capacity of 1100 beds one of the largest in eastern India.

Although several public and private health facilities are available in the state, overall infrastructure for dispensing health related services require improvements. An exception is the Tata Motors Hospital which is an example of an ISO 14001 and 18001 certified hospital with DNB teaching facilities.

Ranchi, the capital, has witnessed a sharp growth in the number of hospitals.

Fluoride in groundwater presents a public health problem in Jharkhand. A recent survey led by the Birla Institute of Technology, Mesra, Ranchi in collaboration with UNICEF in the northwest districts of Palamau and Garhwa found fluoride levels above the drinking WHO drinking water guidelines. Excessive amounts of fluoride in drinking water can lead to dental fluorosis, prevalent bone fractures, and skeletal fluorosis, an irreversible disabling condition. Some work has focused on combating fluorosis through increased calcium intake by consuming local plants. Researchers at Princeton University and the Birla Institute of Technology, Mesra, Ranchi are currently investigating defluoridation options, while performing an epidemiological survey to assess the extent of fluoride linked health problems and the impact of future interventions.

Almost 80% of Jharkhand's people are farmers, although it contains 40% of India's mineral reserves it has some of India's poorest people, in Summer 2009 the state was threatened by drought, with people criticising the government for not providing food aid or assistance.

== Sports ==
JRD TATA Sports Complex, Jamshedpur hosts football matches of Indian Super League and is the home of ISL football club Jamshedpur FC. Cricket, hockey, and football are common sports in Jharkhand. Jaipal Singh, a former Indian hockey captain and Olympian, and Manohar Topno former Indian hockey team player were from Jharkhand. Singh was the captain of the hockey team that won the first gold medal for India in the 1928 Summer Olympics in Amsterdam. Mahendra Singh Dhoni, a former captain of Indian cricket team who led the Indian cricket team to ICC Cricket World Cup glory on 2 April 2011, 28 years after former Indian captain Kapil Dev won the World Cup in 1983 at Lord's, England, is from here.

Other notable cricketers from Jharkhand are Varun Aaron, Shahbaz Nadeem, and Saurabh Tiwary. He was one of the key batsmen in the Indian team that won the 2008 U/19 Cricket World Cup in Malaysia. Other sportspeople include Deepika Kumari, an archer who won gold medal in the 2010 Commonwealth games in the women's individual recurve event. Nikki Pradhan, a member of the national hockey team, is the first female hockey player from Jharkhand to represent India at the Olympics.

An International Cricket stadium with an indoor stadium and a practice ground was constructed. It hosted a One-Day International match between India and England on 19 January 2013. The stadium has hosted two IPL 6 matches for KKR and qualifier 2 of IPL 8 between CSK and RCB in addition to Celebrity Cricket League Matches for Bhojpuri Dabanggs. A tennis academy, which was inaugurated by Sania Mirza and Shoaib Malik, also runs besides the cricket stadium. Ranchi is among six cities in Hockey India League to be played in January 2013. Ranchi franchise was bought by Patel-Uniexcel Group and the team named Ranchi Rhinos. It is now being co-hosted by Mahendra Singh Dhoni and was named as Ranchi Rays.

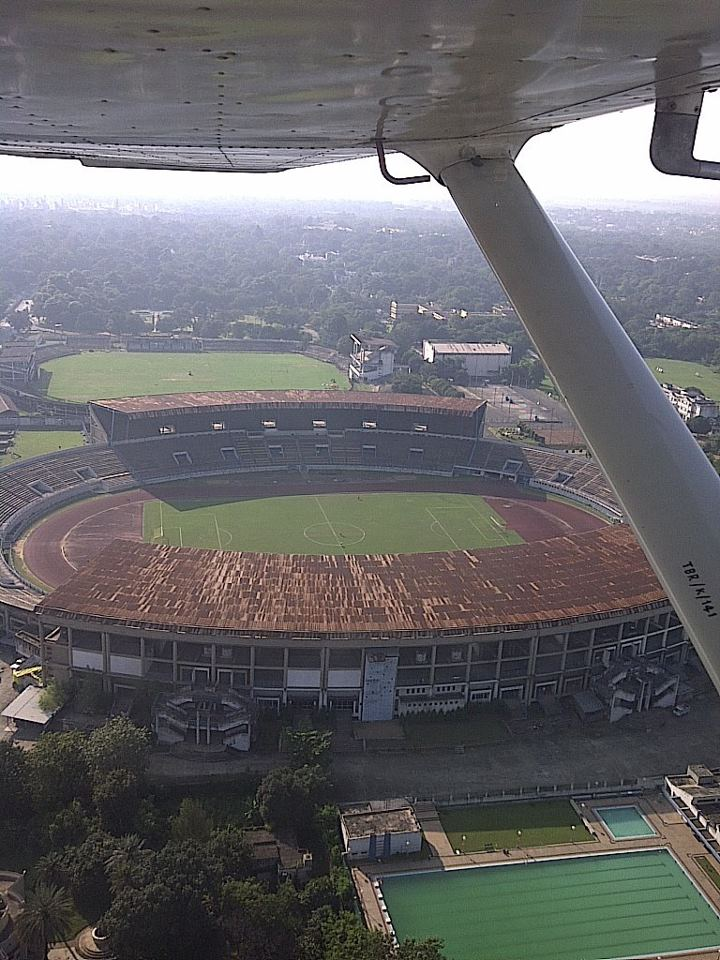
Aerial view of Keenan Stadium in Jamshedpur

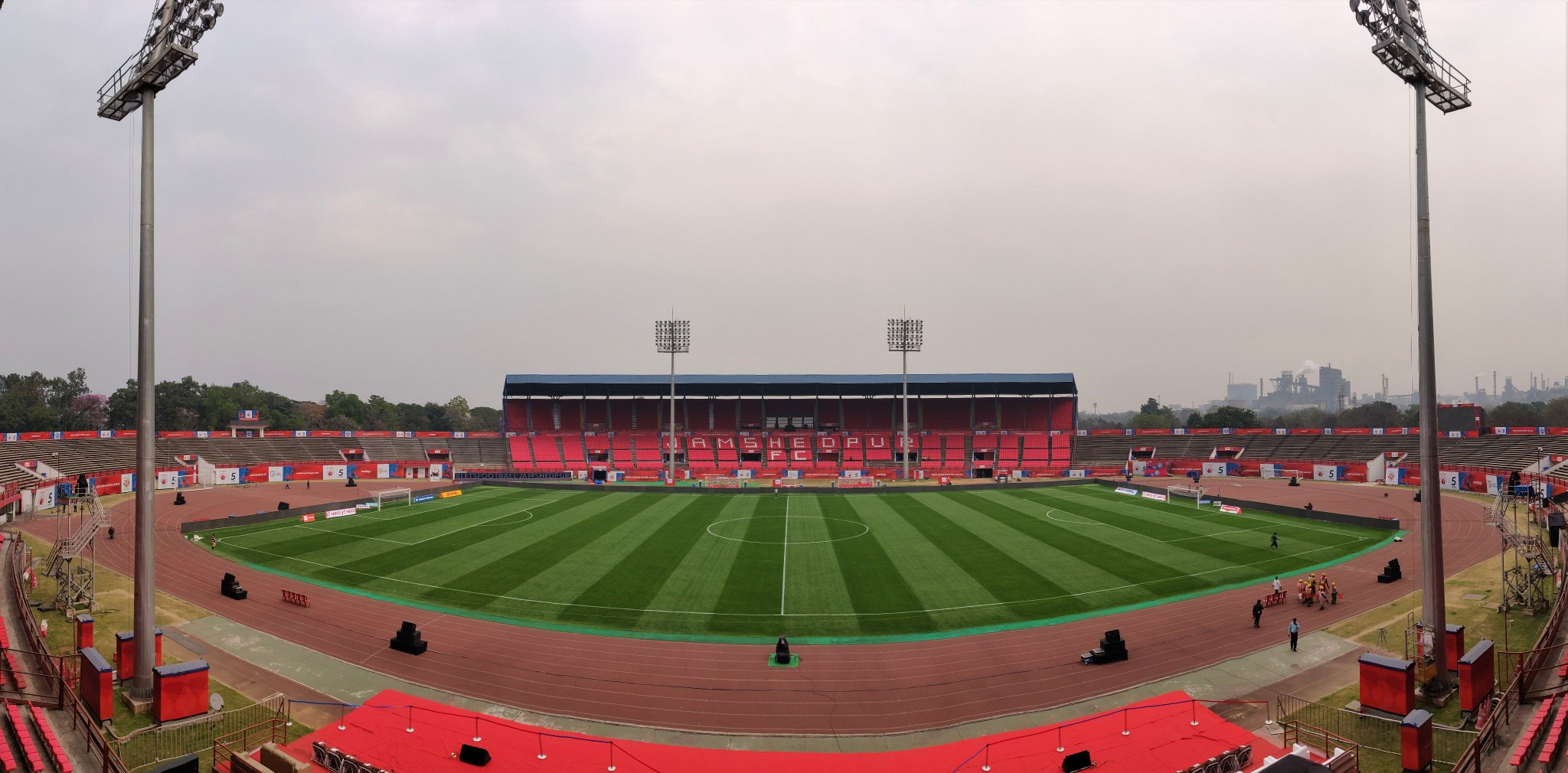
JRD Tata Sports Complex

== Tourism ==
Jharkhand is known for its waterfalls, hills and holy places. Parasnath, Baidyanath Dham, Maa Dewri Temple and Chhinnamasta Temple are major religious places.

Tattapani Hot Water Spring is located 8 km from Latehar. The hot spring water come out from different places on the Sukari River bed. Rich in sulfur, the hot spring is believed to have medicinal properties and good for skin.

Itkhori is a holy place for Hindus, Buddhists and Jains. It is believed to be the place from where Gautama Buddha started his journey for Bodh Gaya. Many sculptures of Hindu, Jain and Buddhist art styles were found in 2018. Rankini Temple of Jadugora is famous in Jharkhand, as well as in Odisha, West Bengal and Bihar. There are several waterfalls in the state including Jonha Falls, Hundru Falls, Dassam Falls, Perwaghagh Falls and Panchghagh Falls. Netarhat is a hill station in the state.

There are several wildlife sanctuaries and national park in Jharkhand including Betla National Park and Dalma Wildlife Sanctuary, which are major attraction for tourists.

State Museum Hotwar and Tribal Research Institute and Museum showcase various cultural heritage and tribal culture of Jharkhand.

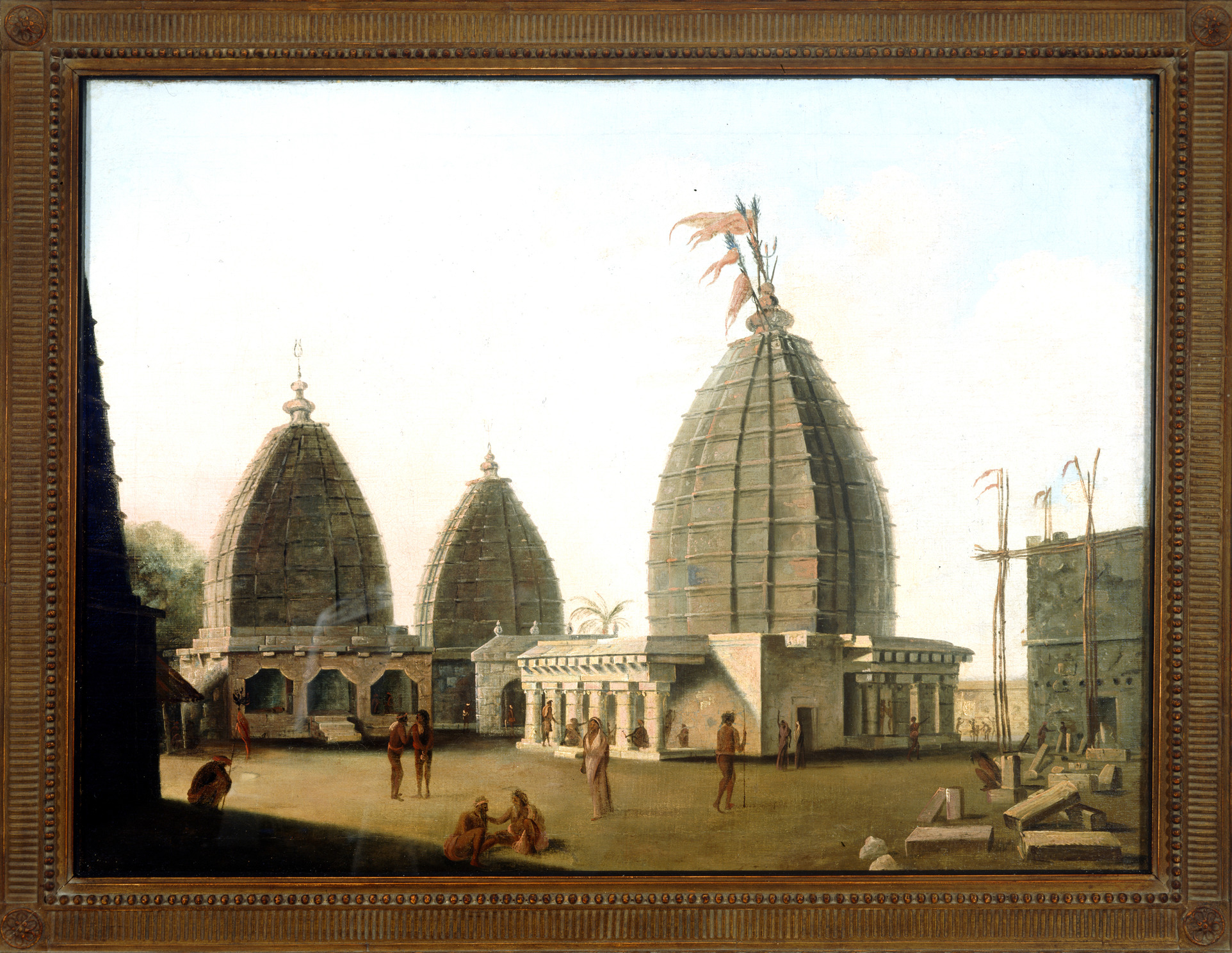
The ancient Baidyanath Jyotirlinga Temple in Deoghar

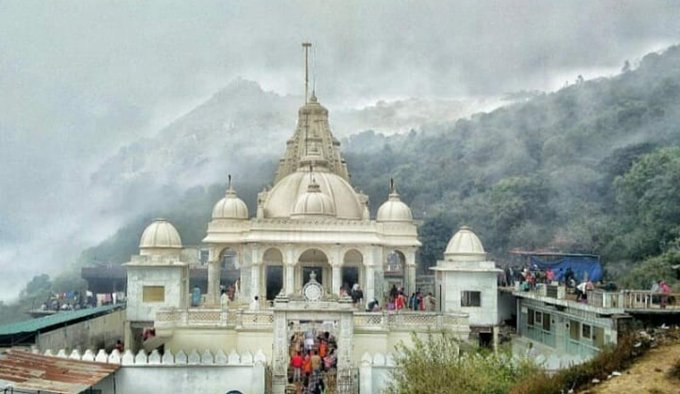
Jain temple at Samet Shikharji, the place from where twenty Tirthankars attained nirvana

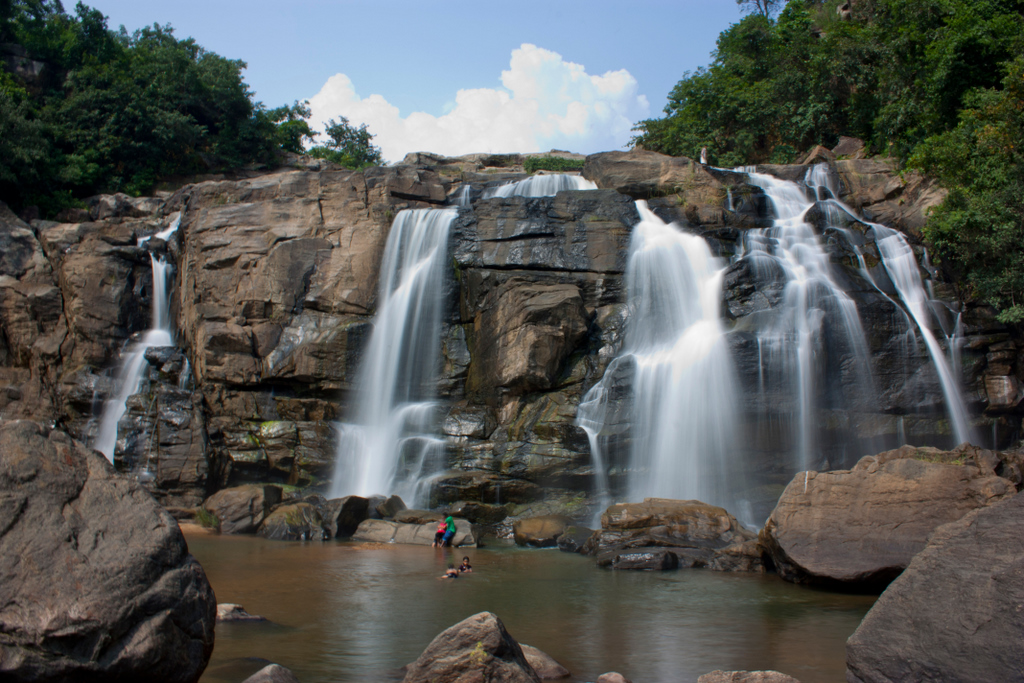
Jonha Falls

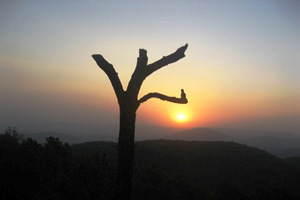
Netarhat

== See also ==
- List of museums in Jharkhand
- List of people from Jharkhand
- Political families of Jharkhand
- JSCA International Stadium Complex
