= List of institutions of higher education in Jharkhand =

In Jharkhand there is 1 central university, 7 Central autonomous Institutions,1 National Law University, 12 state universities, 2 deemed universities, 18 state private universities and 4 State Government Engineering Institutions.

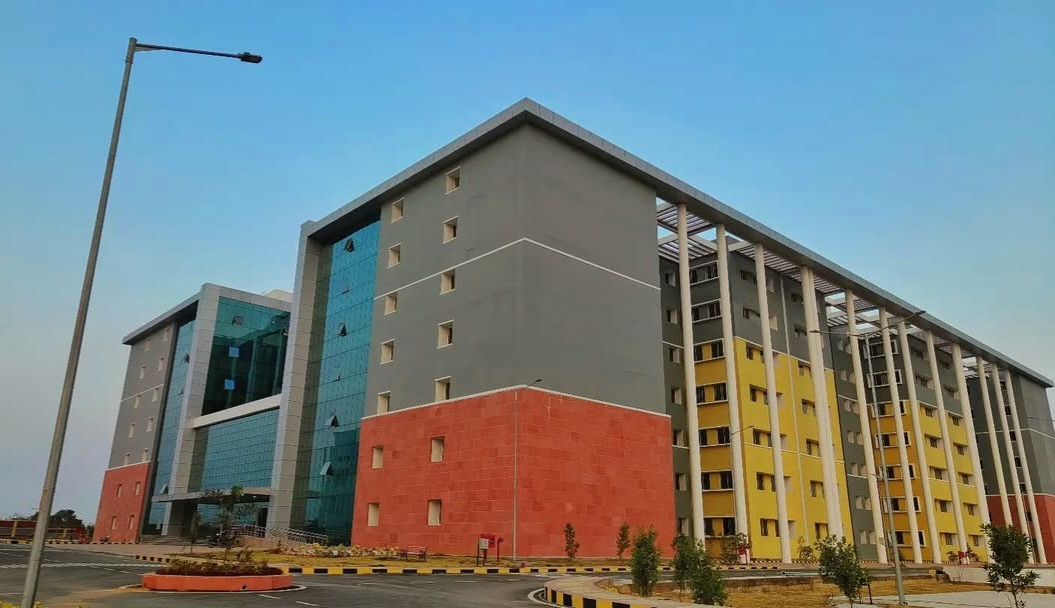
Academic block of Binod Bihari Mahto Koyalanchal University

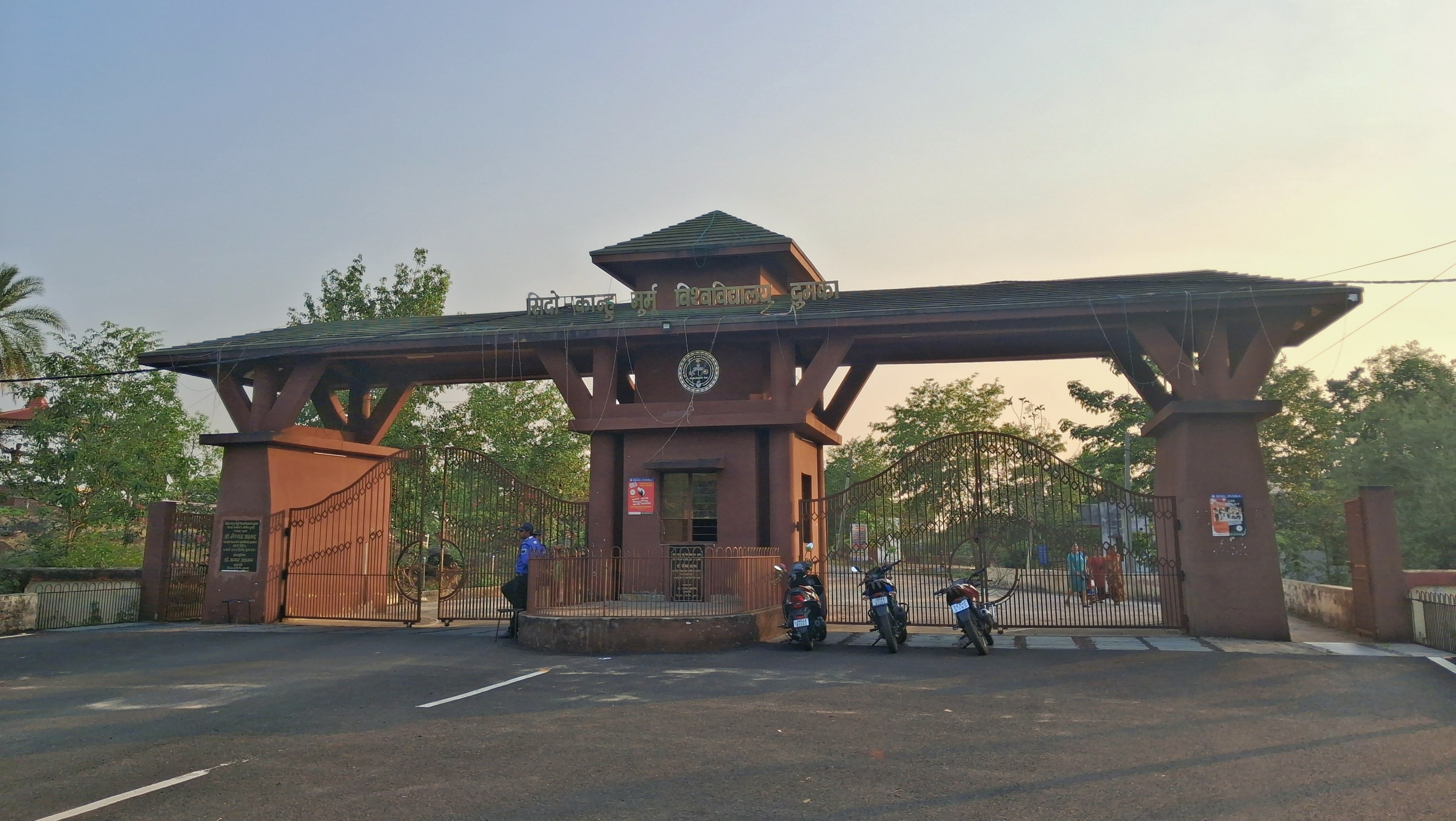
Entrance to Sido Kanhu Murmu University, Dumka

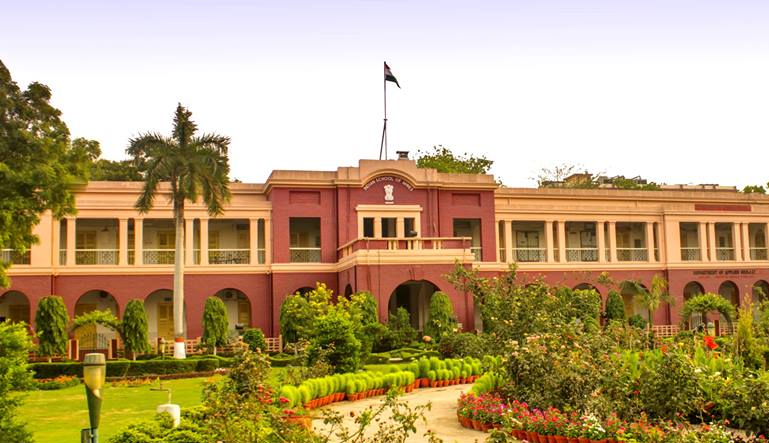
Heritage Building at IIT (ISM) Dhanbad

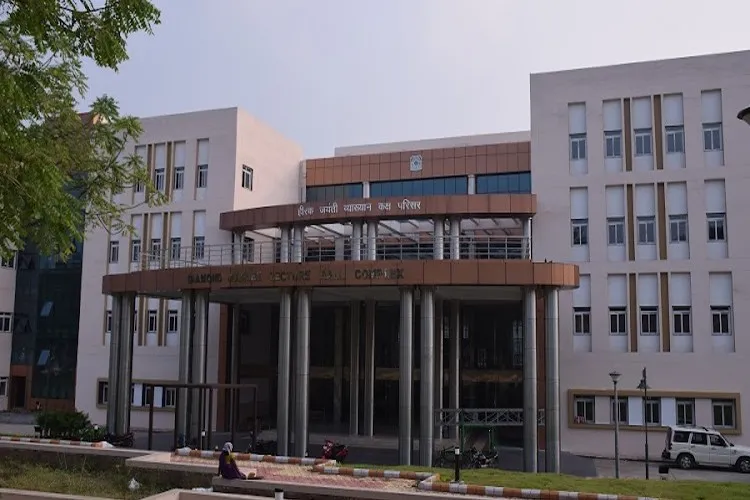
New Academic building of NIT Jamshedpur

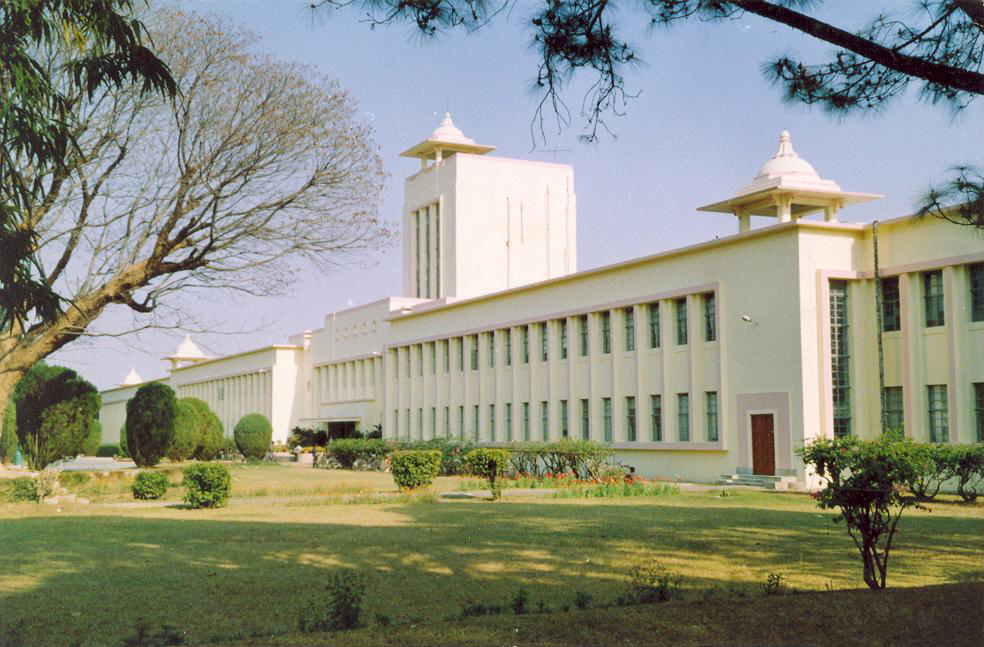
The main building of Birla Institute of Technology, Mesra

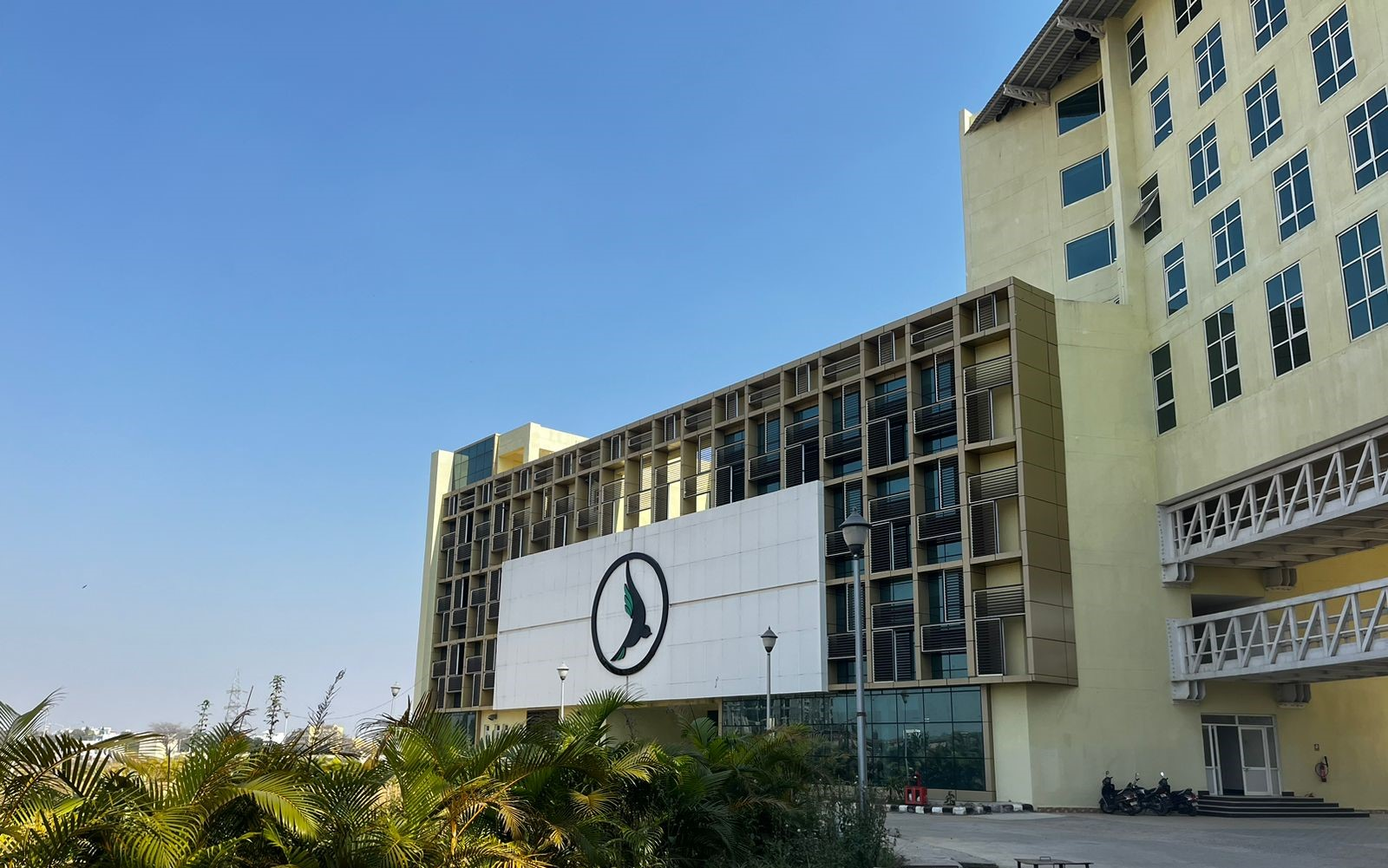
Academic Building of IIM Ranchi (Permanent Campus)

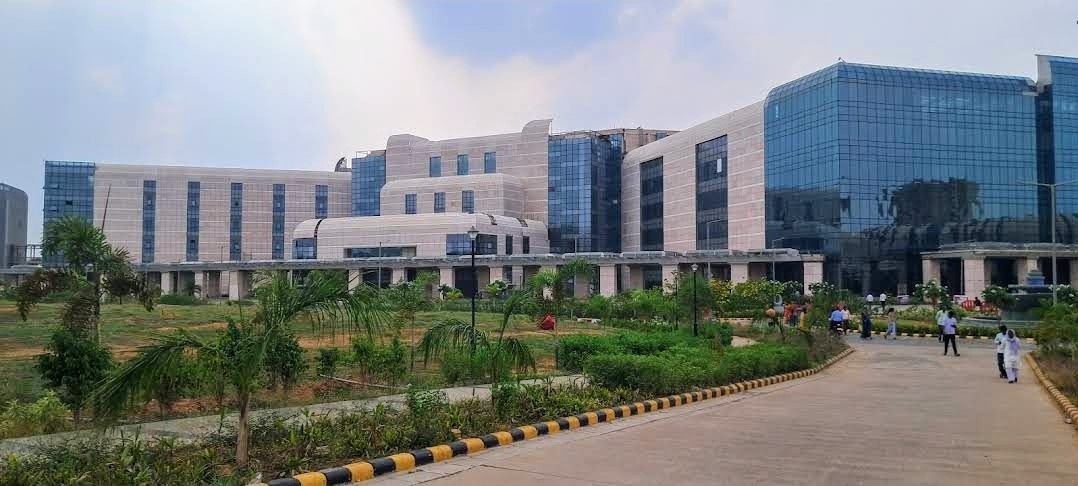
Campus of AIIMS Deoghar

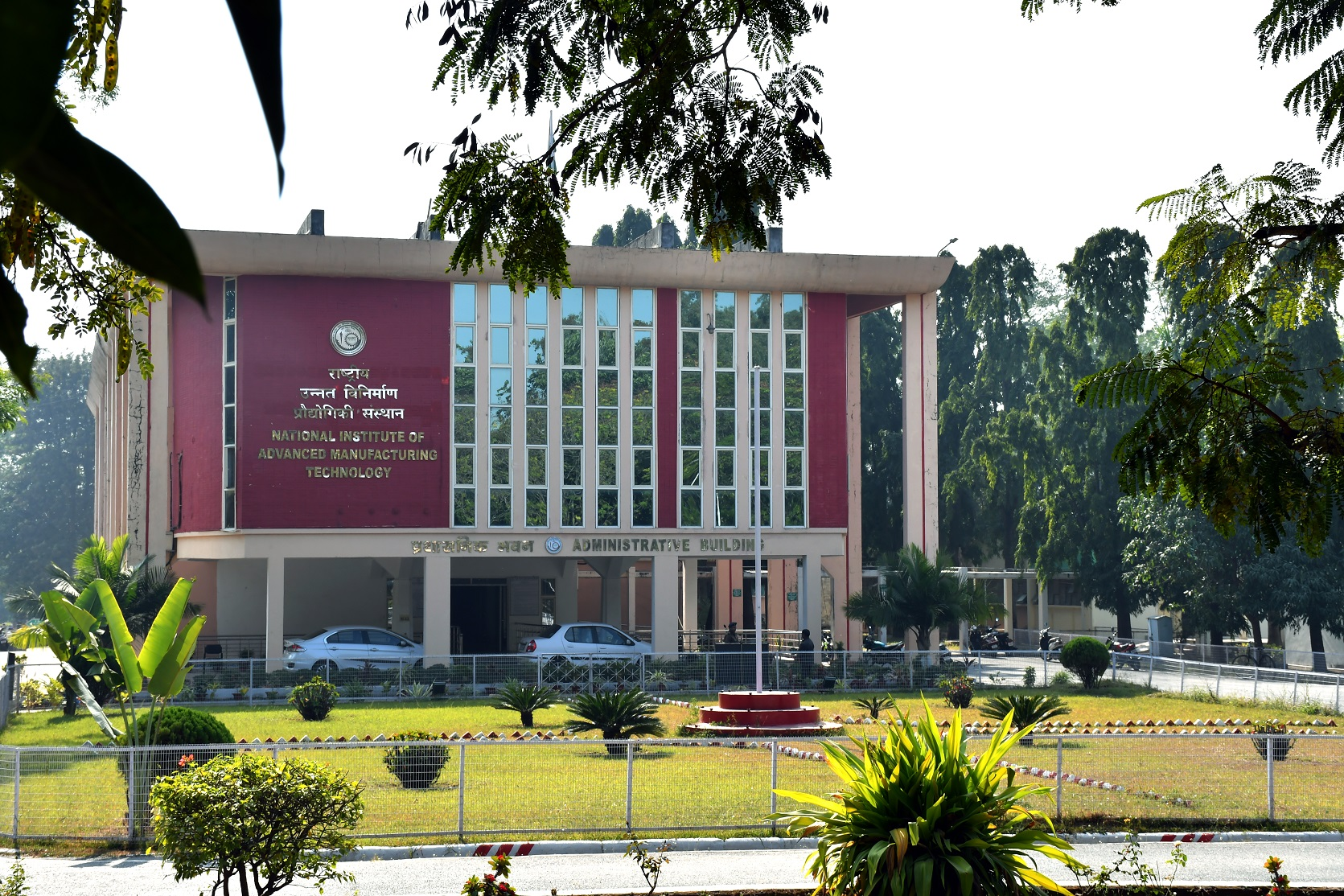
NIAMT Ranchi Administrative Building

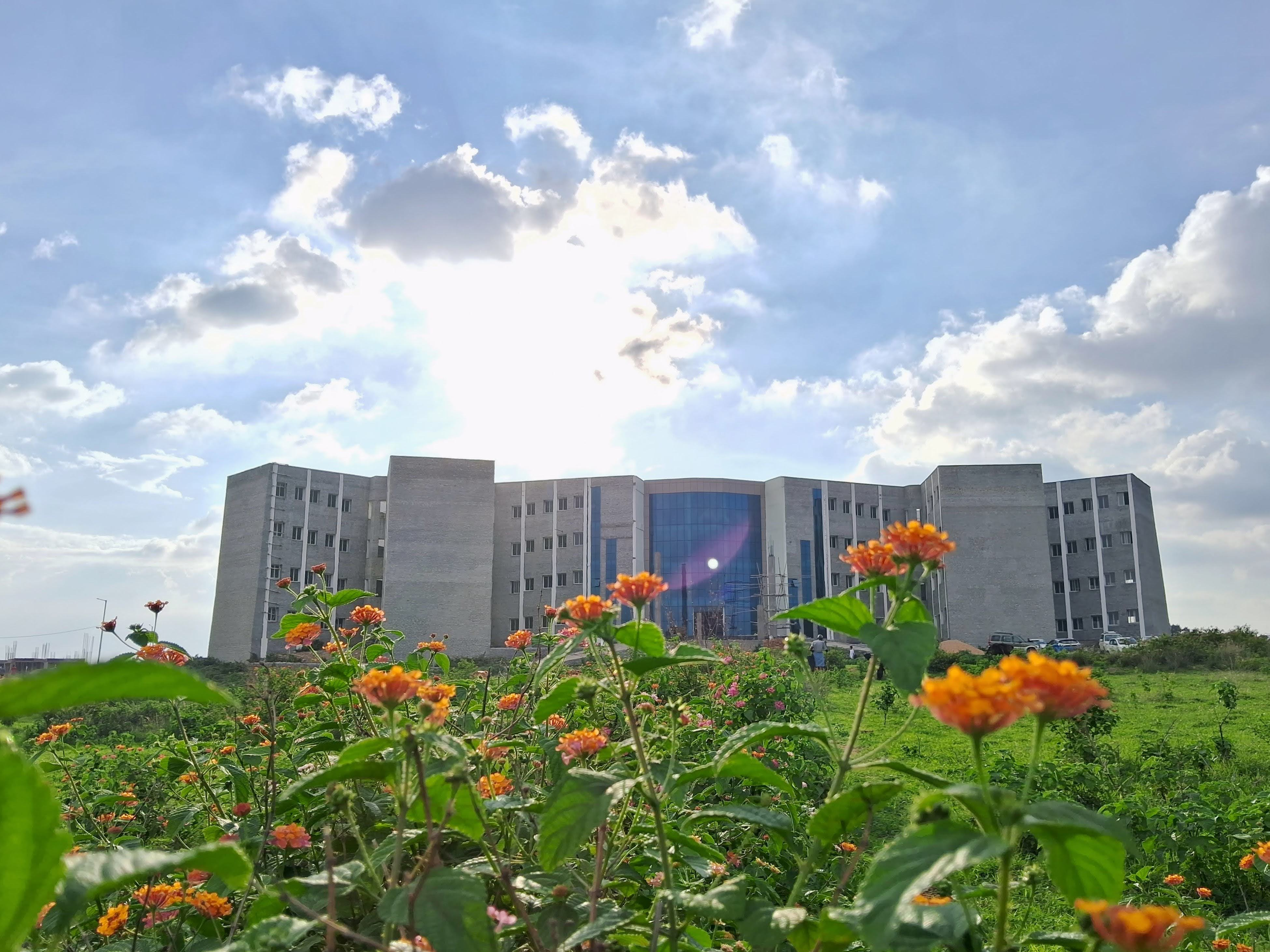
Science Building of Central University of Jharkhand, Ranchi

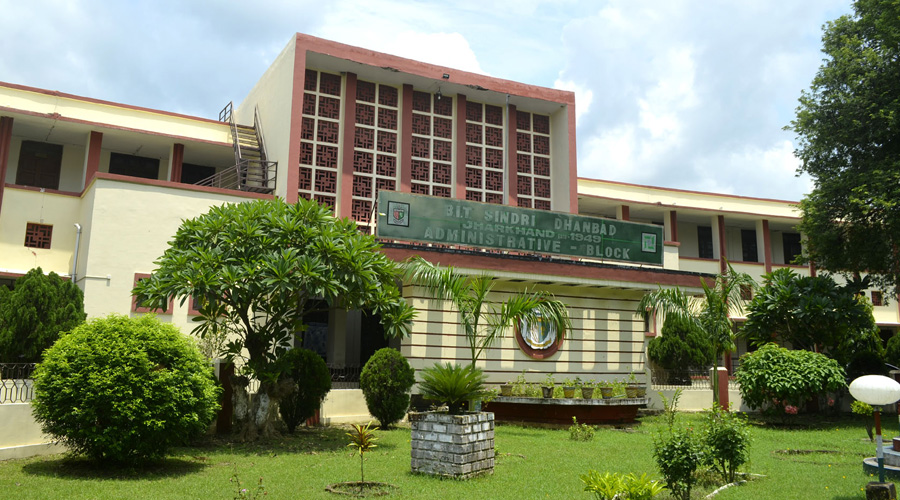
BIT Sindri main building

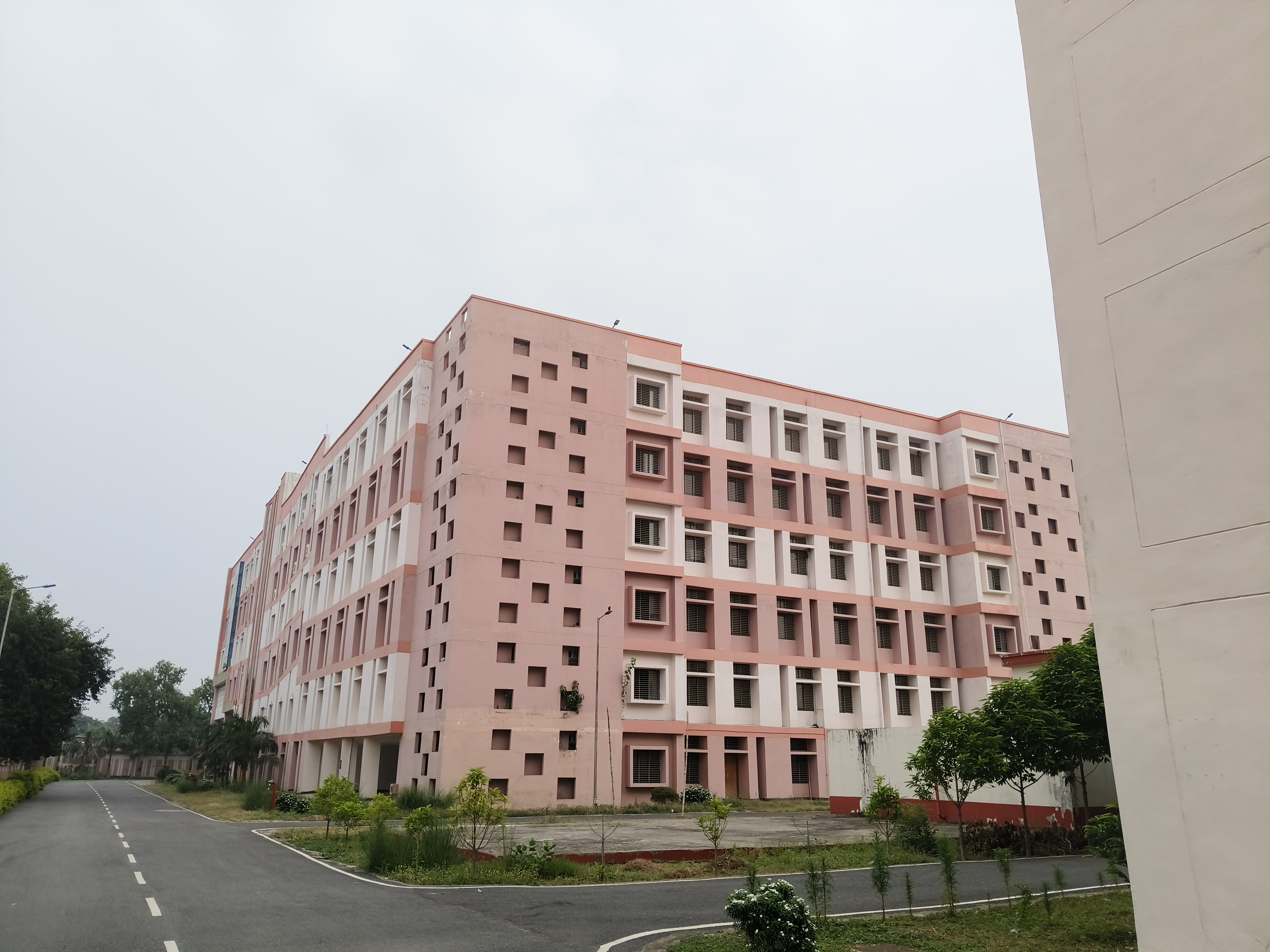
GEC Palamu main Academic building

== Central University ==
University	Location	Type	Established	Specialization	Sources
Central University of Jharkhand	Ranchi	Central	2009	Arts, Science, Engineering and Management	

== Institute of National Importance ==
University	Location	Type	Established	Specialization	Sources
Indian Institute of Technology (Indian School of Mines), Dhanbad	Dhanbad	Central	1926	Science, Technology and Management	
All India Institute of Medical Sciences, Deoghar	Deoghar	Central	2019	Medical	
Indian Institute of Information Technology, Ranchi	Ranchi	Central	2016	Technology and Management	
National Institute of Technology, Jamshedpur	Jamshedpur	Central	1960	Science, Technology and Management	
Indian Institute of Management Ranchi	Ranchi	Central	2009	Management	
Central Institute of Psychiatry	Ranchi	Central	1918	Medical	

== Deemed Universities ==
University	Location	Type	Established	Specialization	Sources
Birla Institute of Technology, Mesra	Ranchi	Deemed	1986	Technology	
National Institute of Advanced Manufacturing Technology	Ranchi	Deemed	1966	Science, Technology and Management	

== State Universities ==
University	Location	Type	Established	Specialization	Sources
Binod Bihari Mahto Koylanchal University	Dhanbad	State	2017	General	
Birsa Agricultural University	Ranchi	State	1980	Agriculture	
Dr. Shyama Prasad Mukherjee University	Ranchi	State	2017	General	
Jamshedpur Women's University	Jamshedpur	State	2019	General	
Jharkhand Raksha Shakti University	Ranchi	State	2016	police science and security management	
Jharkhand State Open University	Ranchi	State	2021	Distance Education	
Jharkhand University of Technology	Ranchi	State	2011	Technology and Management	
Kaushal Vidya Entrepreneurship, Digital and Skill University	Ranchi	State	2022	Entrepreneurship	
Kolhan University	Chaibasa	State	2009	General	
National University of Study and Research in Law	Ranchi	State	2010	Law	
Nilamber-Pitamber University	Palamu	State	2009	General	
Ranchi University	Ranchi	State	1960	General	
Sido Kanhu Murmu University	Dumka	State	1992	General	
Vinoba Bhave University	Hazaribagh	State	1993	General	

== Private Universities ==
University	Location	Type	Established	Specialization	Sources
AISECT University	Hazaribagh	Private	2016	General	
Amity University	Ranchi	Private	2016	General	
Arka Jain University	Seraikela Kharsawan	Private	2017	General	
Babu Dinesh Singh University	Garhwa	Private	2024	General	
Capital University	Koderma	Private	2018	General	
Durga Soren University	Deoghar	Private	2023	General	
Jharkhand Rai University	Ranchi	Private	2011	General	
Netaji Subhas University	Jamshedpur	Private	2018	General	
Pragyan International University	Ranchi	Private	2016	General	
Radha Govind University	Ramgarh	Private	2018	General	
Ram Krishna Dharmarth Foundation University	Ranchi	Private	2018	General	
Ramchandra Chandravansi University	Palamu	Private	2018	General	
Sai Nath University	Ranchi	Private	2012	General	
Sarala Birla University	Ranchi	Private	2017	General	
Sona Devi University	East Singhbhum	Private	2023	General	
Srinath University	Jamshedpur	Private	2021	General	
The ICFAI University	Ranchi	Private	2008	General	
Usha Martin University	Ranchi	Private	2014	General	
YBN University	Ranchi	Private	2017	General	

== State Government Engineering Institutions ==
Institute	Location	Type	Established	University	Specialization	Sources
Birsa Institute of Technology Sindri	Dhanbad	State Autonomous	1949	Jharkhand University of Technology	Science and Technology	
Government Engineering College, Palamu	Palamu	State	2022	Jharkhand University of Technology	Technology	
Government Engineering College Bokaro	Bokaro	State	2025	Jharkhand University of Technology	Technology	
Government Engineering College Godda	Godda	State	2025	Jharkhand University of Technology	Technology	

== Agriculture, Dairy and fisheries science ==
- Agriculture College, Garhwa
- College of Fisheries Science, Gumla
- Rabindra Nath Tagore Agriculture College, Deoghar
- Tilka manjhi Agriculture College, Godda
- Phulo Jhano Murmu College of Dairy Technology, Hansdiha, Dumka
- College of Horticulture, Chaibasa

== Defence ==
- Jungle Warfare School, Netarhat, a defence college for state police and CRPF defence training.

== Degree colleges ==
- St. Columba's College, Hazaribagh (estb. in 1899)
- Ananda College, Hazaribagh
- Markham College of Commerce, Hazaribagh
- St. Xavier's College, Ranchi
- Katras College, Katras, Dhanbad
- Marwari College, Ranchi
- Doranda College, Ranchi
- Gossner College, Ranchi
- Gossner Theological College, Ranchi
- J.N College, Dhruwa (Ranchi)
- Marwari College, Ranchi
- Maulana Azad College, Ranchi
- Nirmala College, Ranchi
- Ranchi Women's College, Ranchi
- St. Paul's College, Ranchi
- Madhupur College, Jharkhand
- Sanjay Gandhi Memorial College, Ranchi
- Ram Lakhan Singh Yadav College, Ranchi
- Loyola College of Education, Jamshedpur
- A.B.M College, Jamshedpur
- The Graduate School College for Women, Jamshedpur
- Jamshedpur Co-operative College
- Jamshedpur Women’s College
- Jamshedpur Worker’s College, estb. 1959
- J. K. S. College, Jamshedpur
- Karim City College, Jamshedpur (two campuses)
- Lal Bahadur Shastri Memorial College, Jamshedpur
- Raja Shiv Prasad College, Jharia, estb. in 1949 by Raja of Jharia
- SSLNT Women's College, Dhanbad
- Guru Nanak College, Dhanbad
- Bholaram Sibal Kharkia College, Maithon (Dhanbad)
- P. K. Roy Memorial College, Dhanbad
- K. S. G. M. College Nirsa, Dhanbad
- St. Xavier's College, Dumka
- Bokaro Steel City College
- Ran Vijay Smarak Mahavidyalaya (RVS College), Bokaro
- Grizzly College of Education
- Sri Ram Krishna Mahila College, Giridih
- Giridih College
- Jamtara College
- Sahebganj College
- Godda College
- Deoghar College, Jharkhand
- A.S College, Deoghar
- Baidhyanath Kamal Kumari Sanskrit College
- Rama Devi Bajla Mahila Mahavidyalaya, Deoghar
- Tata College, Chaibasa
- Shibu Soren Janjatiya Degree College, Borio
- Simdega College
- St. Xavier's College, Simdega
- GC Jain Commerce College
- Kartik Oraon College, Gumla
- Ganesh Lal Agrawal College, Daltonganj
- Yodh Singh Namdhari Mahila Mahavidyalaya
- Sukhdeo Sahay Madheshwar Sahay Degree College, Tarhasi

== Engineering Colleges ==
- K. K. College of Engineering and Management, Gobindpur
- Birla Institute of Technology, Deoghar
- Guru Gobind Singh Educational Society's Technical Campus, Kandra (Bokaro)
- Dumka Engineering College (PPP of Techno India and Govt. of Jharkhand)
- Ramgarh Engineering College (PPP of Techno India and Govt. of Jharkhand)
- Chaibasa Engineering College (PPP of Techno India and Govt. of Jharkhand)
- B. A. College of Engineering & Technology, Jamshedpur
- Cambridge Institute of Technology, Ranchi
- Vidya Memorial Institute of Technology, Ranchi
- Ram Tahal Chaudhary Institute of Technology, Ranchi
- DAV Institute of Engineering & Technology, Medininagar
- Nilaai Group of Institutions
- Maryland Institute of Technology & Management, Jamshedpur
- Bokaro Institute of Technology
- Ramgovind Institute of Technology, Koderma
- RVS College of Engineering and Technology, Jamshedpur

== Law colleges ==
- Bhishma Narain Singh Law College, Palamu
- Chotanagpur Law College, Ranchi
- Imam-ul-Haq Khan Law College, Bokaro Steel City
- Jharkhand Cooperative LAw College
- Jharkhand Vidhi Mahavidyalaya, Koderma
- Law College Dhanbad
- Radha Govind Law College, Ramgarh

== Management ==
- GD Bagaria Institute of Management, Giridih
- Indian Institute of Coal Management, Ranchi
- Institute of Management Studies, Ranchi
- Institute of Science and Management, Ranchi
- Kejriwal Institute of Management, Ranchi
- Department of Commerce & Management, Netaji Subhas University, Jamshedpur

== Medical Colleges ==
Name	Established	City	University	Type	Degrees Awarded	Ref.
Mahatma Gandhi Memorial Medical College, Jamshedpur	1961	Jamshedpur	Kolhan University	State Funded		
Manipal-Tata Medical College, Jamshedpur	2020	Jamshedpur	Manipal Academy of Higher Education	Trust		
Medini Rai Medical College and Hospital, Palamu	2019	Medininagar	Nilamber-Pitamber University	State Funded		
Phulo Jhano Medical College and Hospital, Dumka	2019	Dumka	Sido Kanhu Murmu University	State Funded		
Rajendra Institute of Medical Sciences	1960	Ranchi	Ranchi University	State Funded		
Shaheed Nirmal Mahto Medical College, Dhanbad	1971	Dhanbad	Binod Bihari Mahto Koyalanchal University	State Funded		
Sheikh Bhikhari Medical College	2019	Hazaribag	Vinoba Bhave University	State Funded		
Bethel College of Nursing	2020	Ranchi	Indian Nursing Council	Private		

== Nursing ==
- School of Nursing (Bokaro General Hospital)
- School of Nursing (Tata Main Hospital), Jamshedpur
- Bethel College of Nursing, Kanke (Ranchi)
- College of Nursing, Rims, Ranchi
- College of Nursing (Central Hospital), Dhanbad
- Dhanbad College of Nursing (Asrafi Hospital)
- Florence College of Nursing, Irba (Ranchi)
- Department of Paramedical, Netaji Subhas University, Jamshedpur
- Tribal College of Nursing, Namkum (Ranchi)
- Metas Adventist College (Seventh-Day Adventist Hospital), Ranchi
- St. Barnabas Hospital College of Nursing, Ranchi
- Mahadevi Birla Institute of Nursing & Clinical Technology, Mahilong (Ranchi)

== Polytechnic & MSME Institutes ==
- Department of Polytechnic, Netaji Subhas University, Jamshedpur
- Govt. Polytechnic, Dhanbad
- Govt. Polytechnic, Koderma
- Govt. Women's Polytechnic, Bokaro
- Govt. Women Polytechnic, Gamharia
- Govt. Polytechnic, Khutri, Bokaro
- Govt. Polytechnic, Bhaga (earlier Mining Institute Bhaga), estb. in 1905.
- Madhupur Polytechnic College
- Govt. Polytechnic, Ranchi
- Govt. Polytechnic, Adityapur
- Govt. Polytechnic, Kharsawan
- Pemiya Rishikesh Institute of Technology
- Vidya Memorial Institute of Technology
- Xavier Institute of Polytechnic & Technology, Namkum
- Subhash Institute of Technology, Giridih
- Gumla Polytechnic College
- Chandil Polytechnic School (PPP of JIS Group and Govt. of Jharkhand)
- Silli Polytechnic (PPP of Techno India & Govt. of Jharkhand)
- Pakur Polytechnic College (PPP of Cybobhubaneswar Educational Foundation and Govt. of Jharkhand)
- Indo-Danish Tool Room, Jamshedpur
- Jharkhand MSME Tool Room, Tatisilwai (Ranchi)
- Govt. Tool Room & Training Centre, Dumka
- Bano Model Degree College, Bano
- Govt. Industrial Training Institute, Jamshedpur
- Govt Industrial Training Centre for Women Jameshedpur
- R. D. Tata Technical Education Center, Jamshedpur
- Tata Steel Technical Institute, Jamshedpur

== Research Institutes & Organisations ==
- Research Center, Ranchi - ICAR Research Complex for Eastern Region
- Indian Agricultural Research Institute (Ranchi Campus)
- Indian Institute of Agricultural Biotechnology, Ranchi
- The Indian Institute of Natural Resins and Gums
- National Metallurgical Laboratory (NML), one of the 38 Council of Scientific and Industrial Research (CSIR) labs.
- Central Institute of Mining and Fuel Research (a constituent lab. of CSIR), Dhanbad
- Dr Ram Dayal Munda Tribal Welfare Research Institute, Ranchi
- Central Institute of Plastic Engineering & Technology, Ranchi
- Bihar Institute of Mining and Mine Surveying, Ranchi

== See also ==
- Education in India
- Ministry of Education (India)
- Department of Higher and Technical Education (Jharkhand)
- List of educational institutes in Jamshedpur
