= List of institutions of higher education in Ranchi =

Most of the colleges and institutions of higher education in Ranchi, Jharkhand, India are under the jurisdiction of Ranchi University.

As the institutions of higher studies fall short of city's requirement, many students, after completing schooling in the state, move away to places like New Delhi, Karnataka and several other locations for study of higher technical and non-technical subjects.

== Autonomous ==
- Indian Institute of Information Technology
- Indian Institute of Management Ranchi
- National Institute of Foundry and Forge Technology
- National University of Study and Research in Law
- Xavier Institute of Social Service
- RKDF University Ranchi

== Engineering ==
- Birla Institute of Technology, Mesra
- Birla Institute of Technology, Extension centre, Lalpur
- Cambridge Institute of Technology, Tatisilwai
- RKDF University Ranchi

== General Colleges ==
- Yogoda Satsanga Mahavidyalaya
- Doranda College Doranda
- Gossner College
- Gossner Theological College
- J. N. College
- Mahendra Prasad Mahavidyalaya
- Marwari Boys' College
- Marwari Girls' College
- Moulana Azad College
- Nirmala College, Doranda, Ranchi
- Ranchi College
- Ranchi Women's College
- St. Paul's College, Ranchi
- St. Xavier's College, Ranchi
- Sanjay Gandhi Memorial College
- Silli College Silli, Ranchi

== Law ==
- Chotanagpur Law College
- RKDF University Ranchi

== Medical ==
- Rajendra Institute of Medical Sciences
- Sadar Medical College and Hospital, Ranchi
- Central Institute of Psychiatry

== University ==
- RKDF University Ranchi
- Birsa Agricultural University
- Sarala Birla University
- Central University of Jharkhand
- ICFAI University, Jharkhand
- Amity University, Jharkhand
- Jharkhand Raksha Shakti University
- Ranchi University
- Sai Nath University

== Other ==
- Central Institute of Mining and Fuel Research
- Central Institute of Psychiatry
- Indian Institute of Agricultural Biotechnology
- Indian Institute of Coal Management
- Indian Institute of Legal Metrology
- Indian Institute of Natural Resins and Gums
- International Institute of Professional Studies
- Institute of Management Studies, Ranchi
- Institute of Science & Management
- Kejriwal Institute of Management
- Ranchi Institute of Neuropsychiatry and Applied Sciences
- NILAI Group of Institutions Ranchi
- Ram Tahal Choudhary Institute of Technology
- SBS College, Ranchi
- Swami Mangal Das Pranami College
- Usha Martin University
- Ranchi Veterinary College, Kanke, Ranchi
- Ranchi Agriculture College, Kanke, Ranchi
