= List of educational institutes in Jamshedpur =

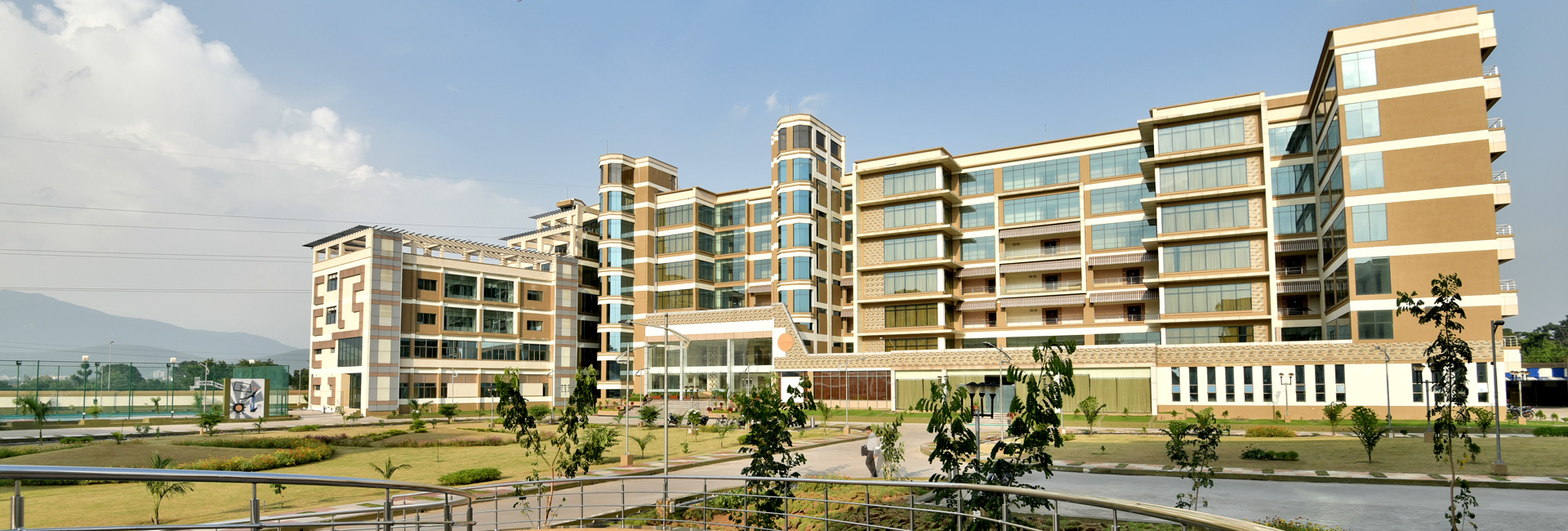
XLRI Jamshedpur

This is a list of notable educational institutes in Jamshedpur, Jharkhand.

== Business school ==
- XLRI – Xavier School of Management

== Engineering college ==
- National Institute of Technology, Jamshedpur

== University ==
- Arka Jain University
- Jamshedpur Women's University
- Netaji Subhas University

== Schools ==
- Carmel Junior College, Sonari, Jamshedpur
- Chinmaya Vidyalaya, Jamshedpur
- Loyola School
- Sacred Heart Convent High School
