= Ramgarh Engineering College =

Private engineering college in the Jharkhand, India

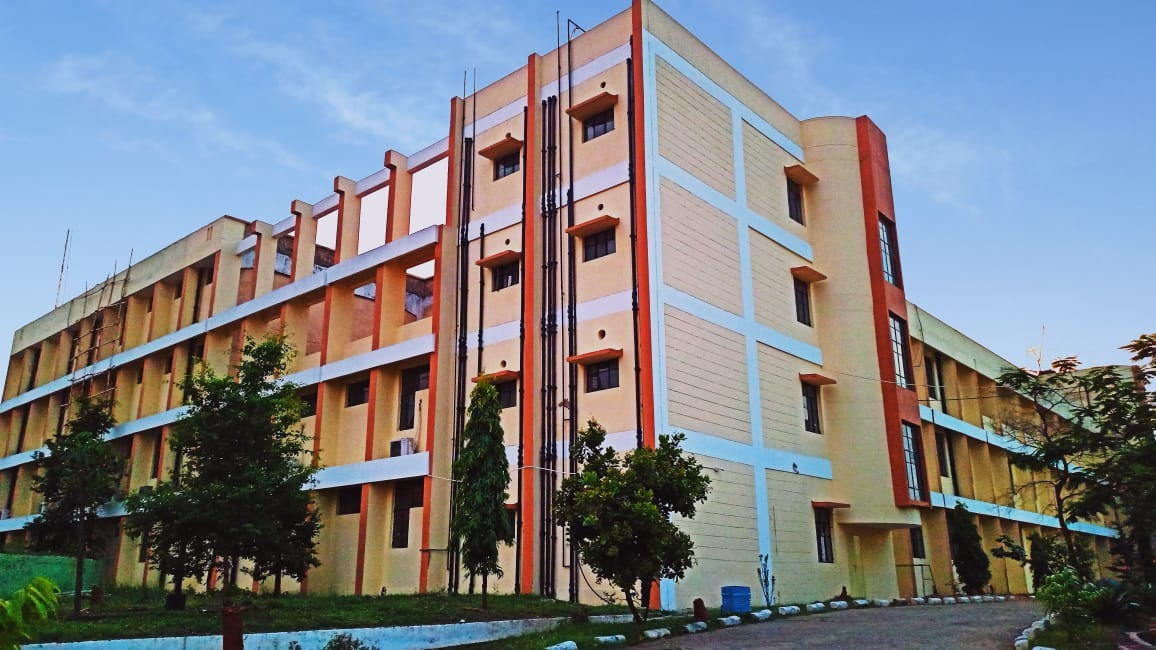
- Main academic building
- Type: PPP
- Established: 2013; 13 years ago
- Founders: Government of Jharkhand
- Accreditation: AICTE, NBA
- Affiliations: Jharkhand University of Technology
- Chairman: Mohit Chatterjee
- Principal: Sharbani Roy
- Location: Murubanda, Ramgarh, Ramgarh, Jharkhand, India; 23.5785°N 85.6300°E
- Website: ramgarhengg.edu.in
- Run by Techno India Group

Ramgarh Engineering College is a private engineering college in the Jharkhand, India, established by the Government of Jharkhand in 2013 under the public–private partnership mode. It was formerly known as Techno India Ramgarh & Government Engineering College Ramgarh. It received a grant from World Bank and the Ministry of Human Resource Development of the Government of India in 2017 under a project named Technical Education Quality Improvement Programme (Phase III).

== History ==
In 2012 the Government of Jharkhand signed a memorandum of understanding with Techno India Group to set up an engineering college at Ramgarh district with three other institutes in Jharkhand. The college started its academic activity in 2013 as Techno India Ramgarh, and changed its name to Ramgarh Engineering College in 2017. Techno India Group is running two other engineering institutes Ii Jharkhand in a public–private partnership mode, Chaibasa Engineering College and Dumka Engineering College.

== Location ==
Ramgarh Engineering College is in the outskirts of the Ramgarh district town on NH-23 at Murubanda, near Chitarpur, Rajrappa. The Nearest railway station Meal is 0.5 km away. It is also 60 km and 55 km away from Birsa Munda Airport and Ranchi Junction railway station respectively.

== Academics ==
The institute was affiliated with Vinoba Bhave University until 2017. In 2018, it became affiliated to Jharkhand University of Technology, Ranchi. All courses are approved by the All India Council of Technical Education. The Institute currently have five departments of engineering;

- Engineering Disciplines:
1. Computer Science and Engineering
2. Civil engineering
3. Electronics and Communication Engineering
4. Electrical engineering
5. Mechanical engineering

== Admission ==
Admission to undergraduate courses were earlier based on ranks in Jharkhand Engineering Entrance Competitive Exam(JEECE), conducted by Jharkhand Combined Entrance Competitive Examination(JCECE) Board. The JCECEB announced in April 2019 that admissions to the institute shall be based on scores in Joint Entrance Examination, a national level engineering entrance examination conducted by the National Testing Agency . 75% of the total intake is reserved for the candidates who have entrance examination rank/results & remaining 25% are admitted through Institutional quota.

== REC student portal ==
The student portal provides support to the students through is website and android app. This portal is developed and managed by Team UDAAN which is a college recognized student body. The app provides real time notifications for notices from management and academics, university question papers, notes, assignments and more. The Team UDAAN also organised events like workshop, quiz competitions like Quizathon, talent hunt like Gusto and many fun events with cash prizes and certificates.
