= Lalkhatanga =

- Village
- Nickname: bhampe
- Location in Jharkhand, India Lalkhatanga (India)
- Coordinates: 23.2626859°N 85.337627°E
- Country: India
- State: Jharkhand
- District: Ranchi

Government
  - Type: Panchayati Raj
  - Body: Gram Panchayat
- Elevation: 675 m (2,215 ft)

Population (2001)
  - Total: 15,400

Languages
  - Official: Hindi, Nagpuri
- Time zone: UTC+5:30 (IST)
- Postal code: 835227
- Telephone code: 00651
- Vehicle registration: JH
- Sex Ratio: 1094:1000 ♂/♀

Lalkhatanga is a small Village/hamlet in Namkum Block in Ranchi district of Jharkhand State, India. It comes under anchal of Namkum. It is located 16 km from District headquarters and State capital Ranchi.

== Physiography ==
Ranchi Sadar Block towards west, Kanke Block towards North, Angara Block towards East, Ratu Block towards west.

== Social structure ==
People in Lalkhatanga are very peaceful and they all love communal harmony. Mainly this village comprises large number of Christian Munda people with the surname Horo.

== Demographics ==
Hindi and Nagpuri are the most spoken languages in Lakhatanga.

== Transport ==
=== Rail ===
There are two major railway stations near to Lalkhatanga in less than 10 km. However Hatia railway station is the nearest railway station of about 3.5 km distance from Lalkatanga.

=== Roadways ===
Roads connecting major cities are providing movement for passenger and freight traffic. There is a district road connecting Torpa, Murhu, Govindpur, Khunti and Ranchi.

== Healthcare ==
To cater the medical needs of patients, especially those with tuberculosis, people go to:

- Govt. Hospital Khunti
- Ramkrishna Sanatorium

== Schools, colleges and universities ==
For making children literate the state government provides:

- Govt. Basic School
- Jaipal Singh High School
- Birsa College Khunti
- St Joseph Intermediate College, Torpa
- Indian Institute of Agricultural Biotechnology

== Tourism and Entertainment ==
Biodiversity Park, Ranchi
