= Pragyan =

Pragyan may refer to:

== People ==
- Pragyan Gogoi (born 1999), Indian footballer
- Pragyan Ojha (born 1986), Indian cricketer

== Other uses ==
- Pragyan (festival), the technical festival of the National Institute of Technology, Tiruchirappalli
- Pragyan (Chandrayaan-2), an Indian lunar rover that crashed in 2019
- Pragyan (Chandrayaan-3), an Indian lunar rover that landed in 2023
- Pragyan International University, a private university in Ranchi, India
