= SBU =

SBU may refer to:

== Military and defense ==
- Security Service of Ukraine or Sluzhba Bezpeky Ukrayiny (SBU)
- Sensitive but unclassified, a U.S. designation of information
- Vought SBU Corsair, an aircraft
- Special Boarding Unit, Japanese special forces unit

== Universities ==
- San Beda University, Manila, Philippines
- Sarala Birla University, Jharkhand, India
- Shahid Beheshti University, Tehran, Iran
- Southwest Baptist University, Missouri, US
- Stony Brook University, New York, US
- University of Health Sciences (Turkey) (Sağlık Bilimleri Üniversitesi)

== Business ==
- Siberian Business Union, a Russian holding company
- Stanbic Bank Uganda Limited
- Strategic business unit

== Technologies ==
- Standard Build Unit in Linux From Scratch
- Sense and Braking Unit, an end-of-train device

== Other uses ==
- SBU, the National Rail station code for Southbury railway station, London, England
- Songbei District, a district of Harbin, China
- Swedish Agency for Health Technology Assessment and Assessment of Social Services
