= K. K. College of Engineering and Management =

- Type: Private
- Established: 2010; 16 years ago
- Parent institution: K. K. Group of Institutions
- Accreditation: AICTE
- Affiliations: Jharkhand University of Technology
- Chairman: Er. Ravi Chaudhary
- Principal: Kamlesh Kumar Chaurasia
- Dean: N. K. Singh
- Director: Er. Richee Ravi
- Location: At Nairo, Bagsuma, Govindpur, Dhanbad, Jharkhand, 828109, India; 23.82989°N 86.5545541°E
- Campus: Sub Urban
- Website: www.kkcemdhanbad.ac.in/home
- Location within Jharkhand Location within India

K. K. College Of Engineering and Management (KKCEM) is an engineering institute situated in the valley of Tundi at Gobindpur in Dhanbad, Jharkhand, India. It was established in the year of 2010.

== Academics ==
The college offers 4 year degree courses in Civil Engineering, Electrical Engineering, Mechanical Engineering, Electronics & Communication Engineering and Computer Science Engineering and 3 year 2nd shift diploma course in Mechanical Engineering. Admission is through Jharkhand Combined Entrance Examination or AIEEE. The courses are approved by the All India Council for Technical Education (AICTE).

== See also ==
- Education in India
- Literacy in India
- List of institutions of higher education in Jharkhand
