= Basudhara Roy =

Indian poet and academic

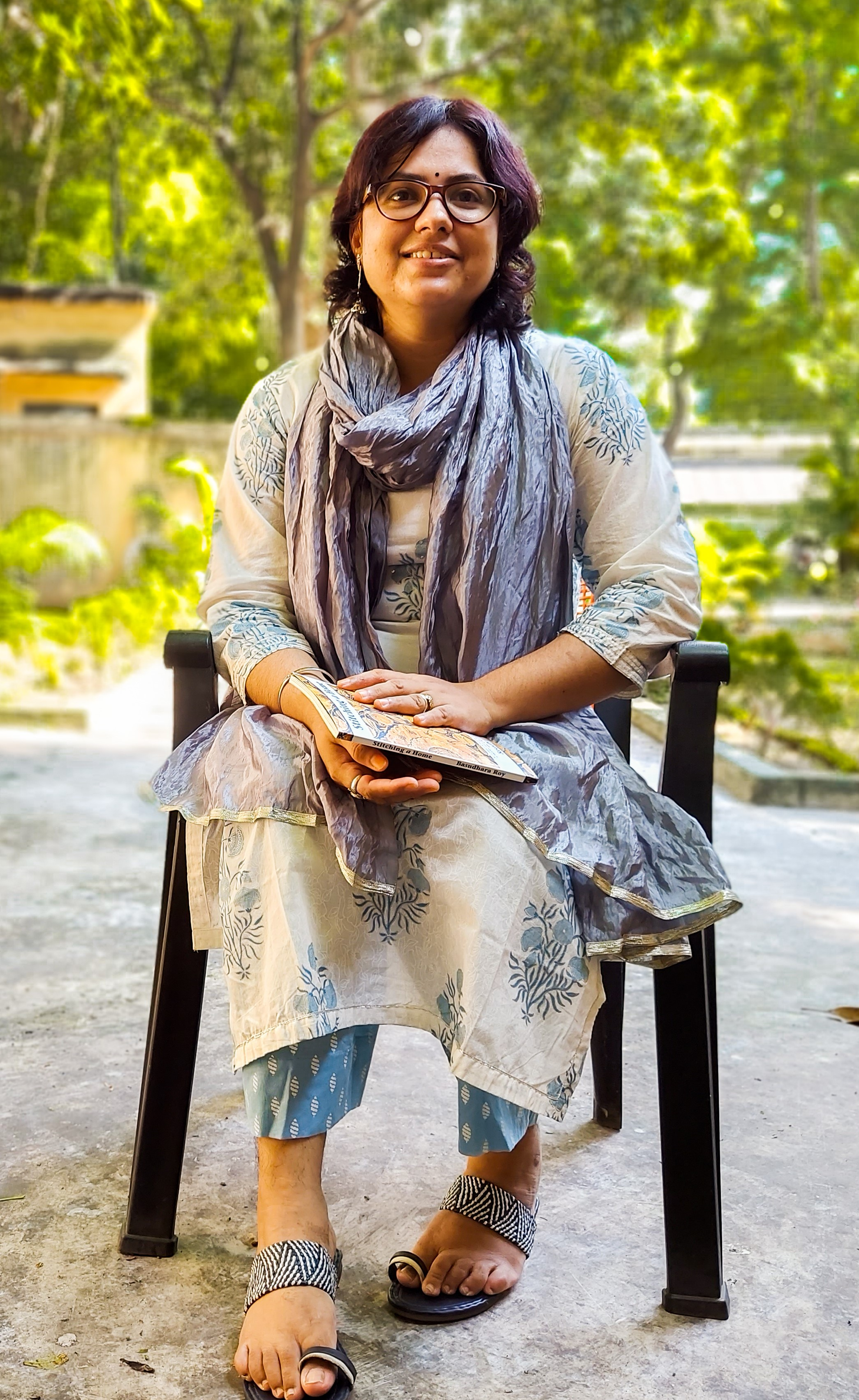
- Born: 1986 (age 39–40)
- Education: Graduated from Banaras Hindu University
- Occupations: Poet and Assistant Professor of English
- Writing career
- Genres: Poetry, Criticism
- Notable works: A Blur of a Woman, Write To Me, Inhabiting, Stitching a Home, Migrations of Hope, Moon in My Teacup
- Website: basudhararoy.com

Basudhara Roy (born 1986) is an Indian English-language poet, critic, and assistant professor at PG Department of English at Karim City College, Jamshedpur, which is affiliated with Kolhan University.

== Early life and education ==
Born in 1986, Roy completed her graduation and post-graduation in English at Banaras Hindu University, where she earned gold medals. She was later awarded the UGC Junior Research Fellowship and received her Ph.D. in Diaspora Women's writing from Kolhan University, Chaibasa.

== Career ==
Roy has been teaching in the Department of English at Karim City College for over a decade, with areas of interest that include diaspora literature, cultural studies, gender studies, postmodern criticism, and ecological studies.

== Published works ==
Roy's academic and creative output spans literary criticism and poetry:

=== Criticism ===
- Migrations of Hope: A Study of the Short Fiction of Three Indian American Writers (Atlantic Publishers, 2019) – a scholarly monograph based on her doctoral research.
- Write to Me: Essays on Indian Poetry in English (Black Eagle Books, 2024)

=== Poetry collections ===
- Moon in My Teacup (Writer's Workshop, 2019)
- Stitching a Home (Red River, 2021)
- Inhabiting (Authorspress, 2022)
- A Blur of a Woman (Red River, 2024)

=== Edited Books ===
- Soul Spaces: Poems on Cities, Towns and Villages (Authorspress, 2022)
- Mapping the Mind, Minding the Map: Twenty Contemporary Indian English Poets (Sahitya Akademi, 2023)

Her poems and essays have appeared in prominent platforms such as EPW, The Pine Cone Review, Live Wire, Lucy Writers’ Platform, The Woman Inc., Madras Courier, Berfrois, Yearbook of Indian English Poetry 2020–21, and The Aleph Review.

== Academic contributions ==
Beyond the classroom, Roy has contributed reviews, translations, and editorial work in literary journals. She has served in editorial roles on boards such as Teesta Review and Daath Voyage, and has guest-reviewed for academic journals. Her conference presence spans topics like diaspora, feminism, ecocriticism, postcolonialism, and pedagogical ethics. Roy also contributes toward theme of Indian Writings in English and takes part in Sahitya Akademi literary events.

== Poetry and critical reception ==
Roy's debut collection, Moon in My Teacup, was praised by Jaydeep Sarangi in The Statesman for its “unassailable gusto,” its blend of intimacy and socio-ecological awareness, and a manner “marked by clarity and modesty,” which the reviewer linked to poetic traditions of Kamala Das and Mamang Dai. According to Lahiri, Roy's "poems never shrink from moral ambiguity and difficult questions of life." In her third collection, Inhabiting, Roy continues to explore emotion and imagery evocatively, showing affinity with figures like Su Tung-Po in her poetic sensibility. Anita Nahal describes her as a neo-romantic poet whose work fuses realism, mystery, drama, and wit, invoking poetic traditions of Pablo Neruda, Langston Hughes, Emily Dickinson, and Maya Angelou, and weaving themes of love, inhabiting, and water. Her recent collection, A Blur of a Woman gathers poems and has received coverage in national press. The Hindu carried a dedicated review of the collection, marking mainstream critical attention to her most recent volume.

Roy explores belonging, memory, relationships, ecological awareness, and lived interiority in her poems. Her poetic language moves between delicate imagery, quiet strength, and emotional resonance, balancing the personal and universal in a voice both reflective and quietly powerful.
