= Silli Polytechnic =

Indian engineering institute

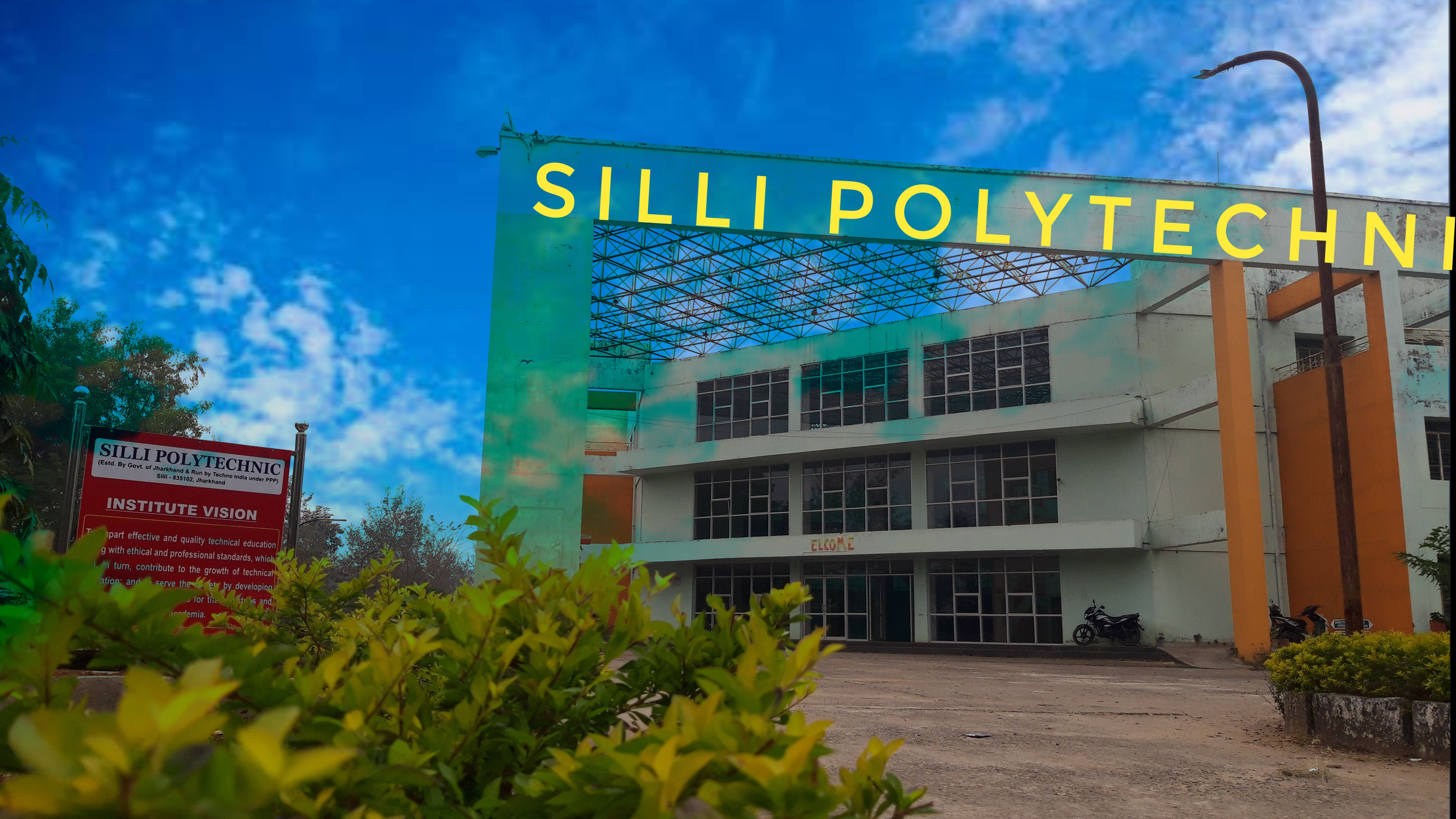
Silli Polytechnic College

Silli Polytechnic College (established by the Government of Jharkhand and run by Techno India) is a diploma-level educational institute established in 2013 under a public–private partnership. It is located in the Vidhan Sabha constituency of Silli, a territory of the Jharkhand Government. The institute was initially known as Techno India Silli and later as Government Polytechnic College Silli.

In 2012, the state government of Jharkhand signed a memorandum with Techno India to establish an engineering institute in the Silli block of the Ranchi district, along with three other institutes at different places in Jharkhand via public-private partnerships. The engineering institute commenced academic activity in 2013 as Techno India Silli and eventually changed its name to Government Polytechnic College Silli. In 2017, it changed its name to Silli Polytechnic College; as their previous name was not registered with the accreditation body, its graduates had difficulty finding employment.

== Location ==
Silli Polytechnic College is located in Silli, a town in the Silli block of the Ranchi district, Jharkhand. The nearest railway station, Silli Railway Station, is three kilometers away. Munda Airport, the nearest airport, is situated 64 kilometers away from the institute.

== Academics ==
The institute was affiliated with the State Board of Technical Education, Jharkhand, until 2017. In 2018, the institute became affiliated with the Jharkhand University of Technology (JUT), Ranchi. All courses are approved by the All India Council of Technical Education. The institute currently has five departments of engineering (diploma level):

- Computer Science and Engineering
- Civil Engineering
- Electronics and Communication Engineering
- Electrical Engineering
- Mechanical Engineering
