= Chaibasa Engineering College =

Undergraduate Engineering College in the State of Jharkhand in India

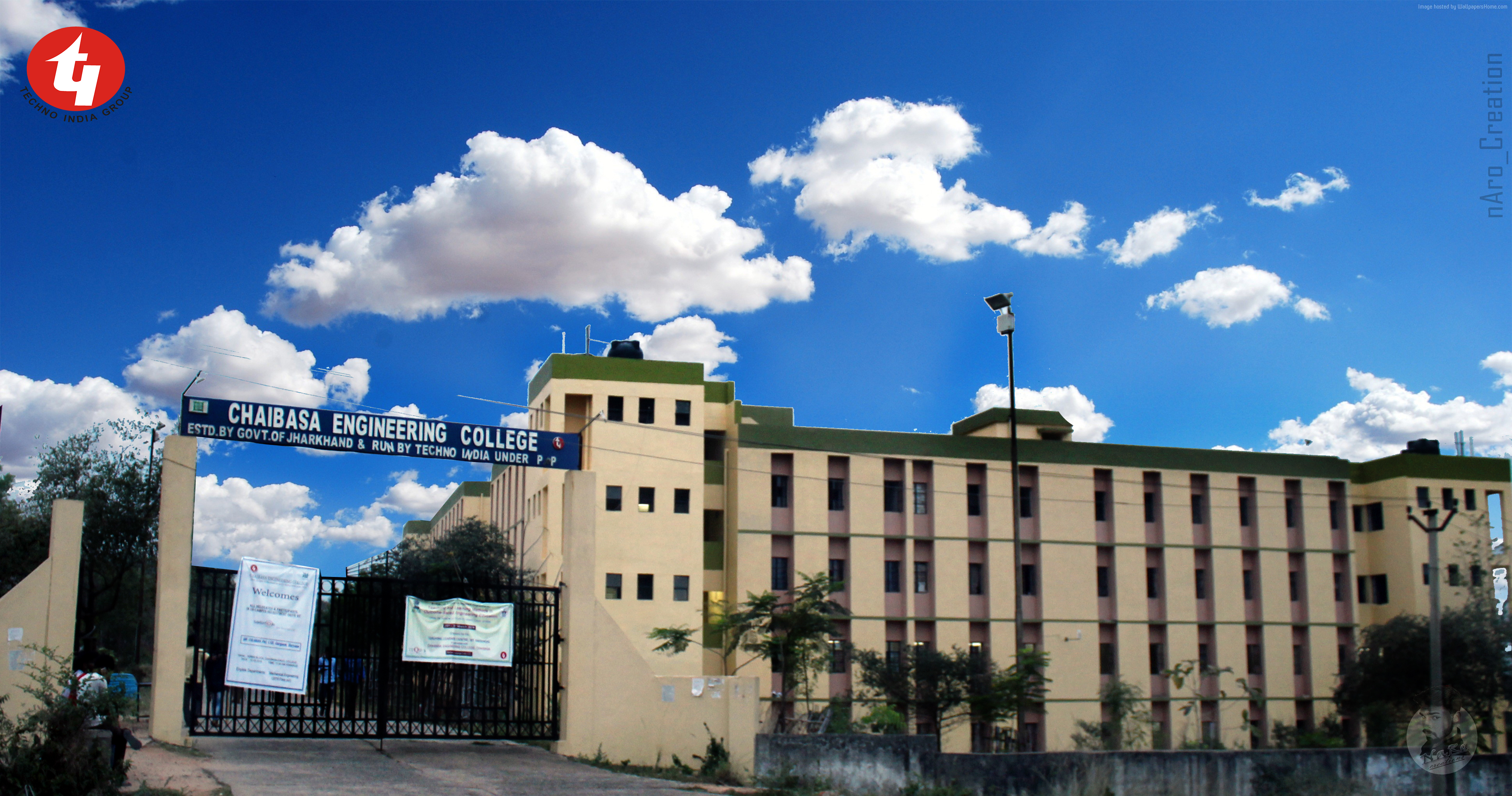
- Main Gate
- Type: PPP
- Established: 2013; 13 years ago
- Founders: Government of Jharkhand
- Accreditation: AICTE, National Board of Accreditation (NBA) for ECE & CSE Program
- Affiliations: Jharkhand University of Technology
- Chairman: Sudipta Chakraborty
- Principal: Debabrata Raha
- Academic staff: 65
- Administrative staff: 13
- Students: 780 (per academic year)
- Location: Jhinkpani, Chaibasa, West Singhbhum, Jharkhand, 833215, India; 22.4643055°N 85.7912127°E
- Campus: 35 acres; Rural
- Language: English, Hindi
- Website: http://chaibasaengg.edu.in/
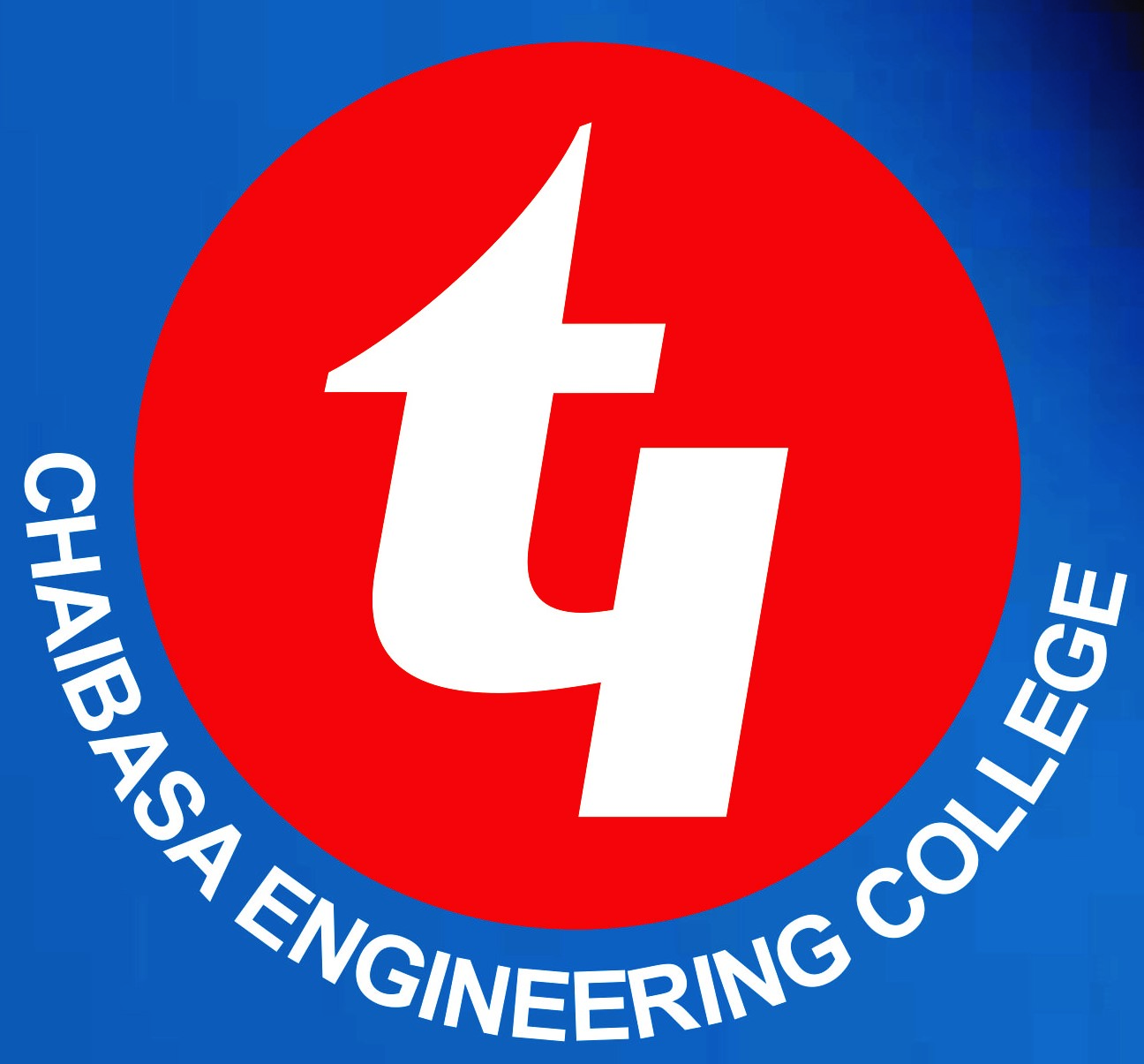

- Location in Jharkhand Chaibasa Engineering College (India)
- Run by Techno India Group

Chaibasa Engineering College is a semi-government engineering college focused on the tertiary study of engineering and natural sciences, located near Chaibasa town in the West Singhbhum district in the Kolhan division of India.

== History ==
The college was established in 2013 by the Government of Jharkhand and managed by Techno India via a public-private partnership and was formerly known as Techno India Chaibasa and Government Engineering College Chaibasa. The college received a three-year joint financial grant from the World Bank and Ministry of Human Resource Development, Government of India in 2017 under the project named Technical Education Quality Improvement Programme (Phase III). This college is a remote center of Indian Institute of Technology Bombay under the National Mission on Education through ICT.

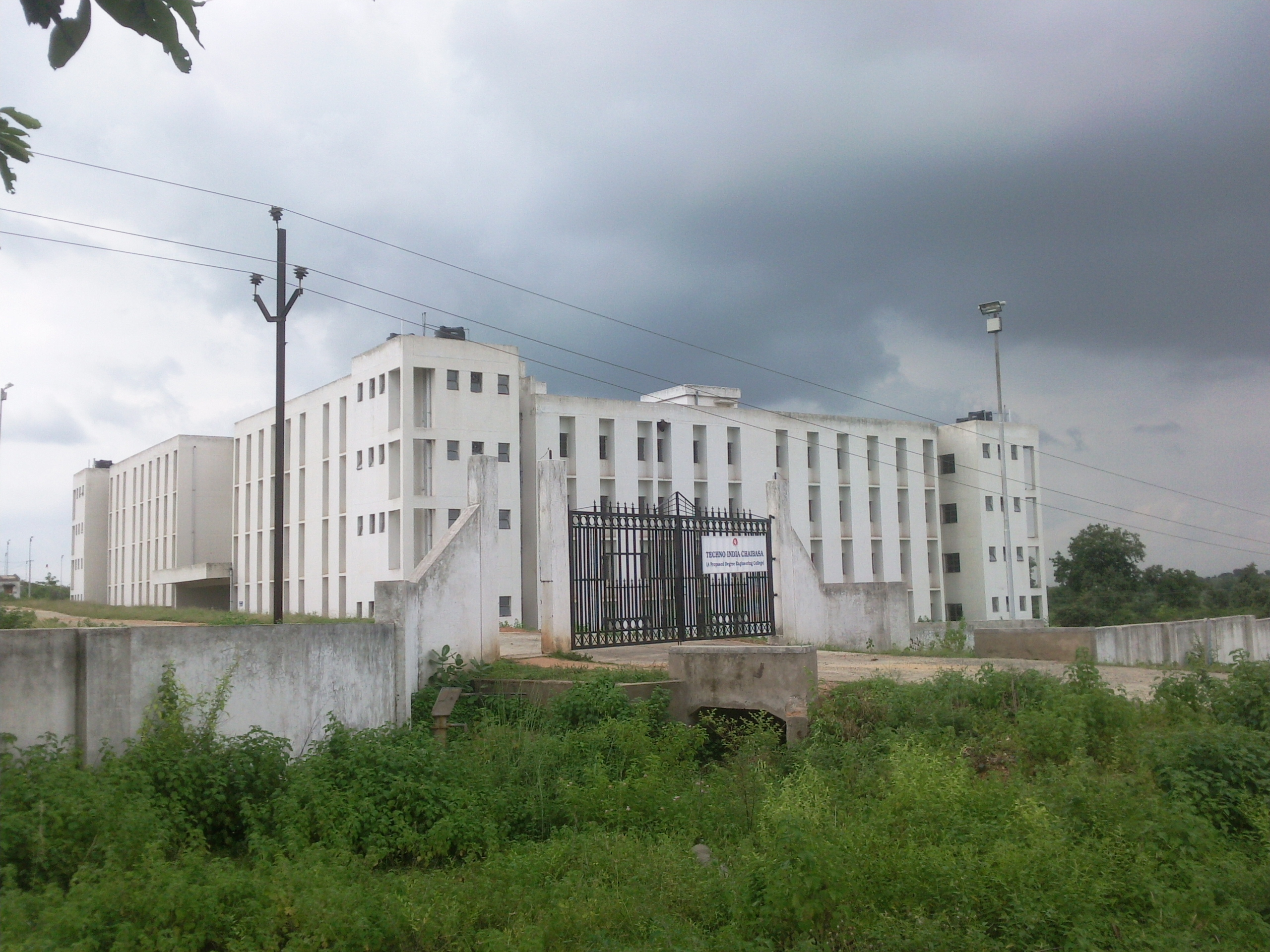
Chaibasa Engineering College Building

== Location ==
Chaibasa Engineering College is located in the National Highway 75 connecting Chaibasa and Jaitgarh, 12 kilometres (7.5 mi) from the Chaibasa town in the West Singhbhum district in the Kolhan division. The campus covers an area of 14 hectares (35 acres). Students are awarded Bachelor of Engineering and Bachelor of Technology qualifications upon satisfactory completion of their studies.

== Affiliation/Approval/Accreditation ==
The institute is affiliated by Jharkhand University of Technology and Kolhan University. Approval has been taken from All India Council for Technical Education. Two Programs of the Institute received accreditation from National Board of Accreditation for academic year 2021-22 & 2022–23. Accredited programs are Computer science and engineering and Electronics and Communication engineering.

== Academics ==
The college was affiliated with Kolhan University until 2017. Since 2018, the college is affiliated to Jharkhand University of Technology (JUT), Ranchi, the foundations of which was laid down by the former Hon'ble President of India, Pranab Mukherjee. All courses are approved by the All India Council of Technical Education. The college currently has five departments of engineering, three in natural sciences, a humanities department:

- Engineering Disciplines:
1. Computer Science and Engineering
2. Civil engineering
3. Electrical engineering
4. Electronics and Communication Engineering
5. Mechanical engineering
- Natural Sciences:
1. Physics
2. Chemistry
3. Mathematics

== Admission ==
Admission to undergraduate courses were earlier based on ranks in Jharkhand Engineering Entrance Competitive Exam, conducted by Jharkhand Combined Entrance Competitive Examination Board. The board announced in April 2019 that admissions to the institute shall be based on scores in Joint Entrance Examination, a national level engineering entrance examination conducted by the National Testing Agency. 75% of the total intake is reserved for the candidates who have entrance examination rank/results & remaining 25% are admitted through Institutional quota.

== Training and placement ==
The institute has a training and placement cell which is responsible for on and off campus placement for students. It also helps to provide internship, industrial training, and other forms of training for the students during the course.

== Student organisations ==
There are numerous active student clubs, covering various activities and events on campus:

- Annual Cultural Fest Zephyr
- Annual Technical Fest Navkriti
- E-Cell /Startup Cell " The Root"

== Achievements ==
- 2017 pass out Computer Science & Engineering student Sushmita Kumari Nishad bagged gold medal for securing 1st position in Engineering (UG level) under Kolhan University.
- 2018 pass out Computer Science and Engineering student Shubham was awarded by Govt of Jharkhand for developing an application for Jharkhand Tourism.
- Institute Received ISO certificate ISO 9001:2015 for quality parameters.
- National Board of Accreditation (NBA) granted 3-year accreditation to Computer Science & Engineering, Electronics & Communication Engineering Department in the year 2021.
