= G. S. Lakshmi =

Indian cricket match referee (born 1968)

Personal information
- Full name: Gandikota Sarva Lakshmi
- Born: 23 May 1968 (age 58); Rajahmundry, Andhra Pradesh, India
- Nickname: Laksh
- Batting: Right-handed
- Bowling: Right-arm fast-medium

International information
- National side: India

Domestic team information
- Years: Team
- 1985/86–1990/91: Bihar
- 1990/91: East Zone
- 1993/94–1999/00: South Zone
- 1999/00: Andhra
- 2002/03: Railways
- Source: CricketArchive, 15 January 2022

Gandikota Sarva Lakshmi is an Indian cricket match referee and a former domestic cricketer and coach. She was a right-handed batter and right-arm fast-medium outswing bowler.

Lakshmi became the first woman to be appointed to the International Cricket Council's International Panel of Match Referees on 14 May 2019. The first match that she refereed was played between England and Australia.

== Early life ==
Lakshmi was born to a Brahmin family in Rajahmundry, Andhra Pradesh on 23 May 1968. She grew up in Jamshedpur where her father worked for the Tata Engineering and Locomotive Company (now Tata Motors). Lakshmi began playing cricket in Tata Nagar. She was initially denied admission to the Jamshedpur Women's College in 1986 due to her "terribly poor marks" in 10th board examinations. However, her father requested her to tryout for the college's sports quota. She was able to secure admission to Jamshedpur Women's College who felt that she could be their frontline fast bowler. She moved to Hyderabad in 1989 after securing a job with South Central Railway and subsequently began playing for the South Central Railways cricket team.

== Career ==
Lakshmi played for several domestic teams including Andhra Women, Bihar Women, Railways Women, East Zone Women and South Zone Women between 1989 and 2004. Lakshmi got married in 1991. She received a call-up to the Rest of India team on her wedding day but chose to take a sabbatical from cricket. She returned to cricket with the South Central Railways team and helped them win the inter-Railways title for the first time in 1995. She was selected in the squad for the India women's national cricket team's tour of England in 1999, but was not selected in the playing eleven in a single match during the tour. Lakshmi retired from cricket in 2004.

After her retirement, Lakshmi served as coach of the South Central Railways team until 2014. Lakshmi first officiated as a match referee in domestic women's cricket in the 2008–09 season. She was among a group of five female referees who made their debuts during the season after the Board of Control for Cricket in India (BCCI) allowed female referees for the first time in domestic cricket. Lakshmi was the only one among the group to have not played for the India national team. She was among five female candidates shortlisted through the BCCI's qualification exam for match referees in 2014. Subsequently, she was permitted to officiate boys' and men's domestic games. Lakshmi issued her first Code-of-Conduct penalty in a match between UP and Bengal in the under-19 Cooch Behar Trophy. The BCCI recommended her for appointment to the ICC International Panel of Match Referees in 2018.

Lakshmi was the match referee for all four matches of the 2019 Women's T20 Challenge. She was the first woman to be appointed to the ICC International Panel of Match Referees on 14 May 2019. She was one of the three match referees for the 2019 ICC T20 World Cup Qualifier tournament in the United Arab Emirates, becoming the first woman to be named as a referee at an ICC event. In December 2019, she was named as the match referee for the opening match of the 2019 United Arab Emirates Tri-Nation Series, becoming the first woman to oversee a men's ODI match.

In September 2024 she was named as part of an all-female officiating group for the 2024 ICC Women's T20 World Cup.
