= Usha Martin University =

Private university in Ranchi, Jharkhand, India

- Motto: Inclusion, Innovation & Ethics
- Type: Private
- Established: 2012
- Affiliations: UGC
- Chancellor: Prabhat Kumar
- Vice-Chancellor: Rajni Kant
- Location: Ranchi, Jharkhand, India; 23.3734294°N 85.337184°E
- Campus: Semi-Urban
- Colours: Royal Blue & Orange
- Website: www.umu.ac.in

Usha Martin University is a private university located in Ranchi, Jharkhand, India set up by Usha Martin. Usha Martin University was set up in 2012 vide Usha Martin University, Jharkhand Act 2012 and is duly recognised by the University Grants Commission as a private university. It has been accredited by the National Assessment and Accreditation Council (NAAC) with 'A’ Grade.

== University Management ==
- Chancellor – Prabhat Kumar
- Pro-Vice Chancellor (Administration) – Brig. (Dr.) Sumar Vir Singh
- Pro-Vice Chancellor (Academic) – Sanjaya Mishra
- Vice-Chancellor – Prof. Rajni Kant

== Academics ==
Usha Martin University offers degree programs in disciplines including undergraduate and postgraduate education. Usha Martin University has the following academic departments:

- Faculty of Arts and Social Science
- Faculty of Engineering & Technology
- Faculty of Business Management and Administrative Studies
- Faculty of Computing and Information Technology
- Faculty of Special Education
- Faculty of Commerce
- Faculty of Science
- Faculty of Pharmacy
- Faculty of Health & Paramedical Science
- Faculty of Physiotherapy
- Faculty of Nursing
- Faculty of Education
- Faculty of Forensic Science
- Faculty of Journalism & Mass Communication
- Faculty of Engineering Diploma
- Faculty of Law Legal Studies
- Faculty of Agriculture

== See also ==
- Education in India
- List of private universities in India
- List of institutions of higher education in Jharkhand
