= Netaji Subhas University =

Private university in Jamshedpur, India

- Other name: NSU
- Former name: Netaji Subhas Institute of Business Management
- Type: Private
- Established: September 2018; 7 years ago
- Affiliations: UGC
- Chancellor: Madan Mohan Singh
- Vice-Chancellor: Dr. Prabhat Kumar Pani
- Visitor: Governor of Jharkhand
- Location: Jamshedpur, Jharkhand, India; 22.8090654°N 86.2631231°E
- Campus: Urban
- Website: www.nsuniv.ac.in

Netaji Subhas University (NSU), formerly Netaji Subhas Institute of Business Management (NSIBM), is a private university at Pokhari on the outskirts of Jamshedpur, Jharkhand, India.

== History ==
The university was approved by the Jharkhand cabinet on 18 July 2018 and the Bill for its establishment was summarily passed on 21 July. The university was formally established in September 2018 under Netaji Subhas University Act, 2018 and was inaugurated in October 2018. It is the second private university in the Kolhan division, following Arka Jain University.

== See also ==
- Education in India
- List of private universities in India
- List of institutions of higher education in Jharkhand
