= Jamshedpur Women's University =

Women's College in India

Jamshedpur Women’s University
- University Logo
- Other name: JWU
- Type: Public State University
- Established: 1953; 73 years ago as Jamshedpur Women’s College; 2019; 7 years ago as Jamshedpur Women’s University
- Accreditation: NAAC (A)
- Affiliations: UGC
- Chancellor: Governor of Jharkhand
- Vice-Chancellor: Prof. (Dr) Ela Kumar
- Academic staff: 126
- Administrative staff: 210
- Students: 4,800+
- Undergraduates: 2,600+
- Postgraduates: 1,400+
- Doctoral students: 1,100+
- Location: Jamshedpur, Jharkhand, 831001, India; 22.7969829°N 86.1805778°E
- Campus: Urban
- Website: jwu.ac.in
- Location within Jharkhand Location within India

Jamshedpur Women’s University formerly Jamshedpur Women's College, established in 1953, was a general degree women's college in the Jharkhand state of India. Perin C. Mehta founded it. In 1962 the college acquired its own campus which was gifted by philanthropist Ratan Tata.

It offers undergraduate and postgraduate courses in arts, commerce and sciences. Affiliated with Kolhan University, the university has grade 'A' accreditation from NAAC. It has been recognized by the University Grants Commission as a Center with Potential for Excellence (CPE).

The college aims to provide holistic education for its students while giving special attention to SC and ST students. Under the Jharkhand State University Amendment Act 2017, the college will become the first university for women in Jharkhand. The upgrade was approved by the governor and chancellor of the State Universities, Draupadi Murmu.

== Location ==
The college is located in the town of Jamshedpur in Jharkhand state. Jamshedpur was previously a village called Sakchi which was renamed by Lord Chelmsford in 1919. The city is named Jamshedpur after the founder of Tata Steel, Jamsetji Nusserwanji Tata.

== Departments ==
The college began with an arts department. The science and the commerce departments were added in 1972 and 1974 respectively. Honours courses were also included in various subjects during the 1960s.

The university has added vocational courses such as B.Ed. & M.Ed., Environment and Water Management, Bio technology, Mass Communication and Journalism, Bachelor in Library and Information Science, BBA, MBA, Clinical Nutrition and Dietetics. Additional courses in Electronics, Communicative English, Banking and Human Rights and Value in Education are offered. The college also promotes research by the Gandhian Study Centre for Research.

The UG courses follow a typical six semester trajectory. The dean of Social Sciences is Bina Lakara, Dr Anjali Srivastava for Science and Dr. Deepa Sharan for Commerce.

=== Science ===
- Chemistry
- Physics
- Mathematics
- Botany
- Zoology

=== Arts and Commerce ===
- Bengali
- Hindi
- English
- History
- Oriya
- Urdu
- Sanskrit
- Home Science
- Political Science
- Economics
- Philosophy
- Psychology
- Music
- Education
- Commerce

== Scholarships and stipends ==
- (i) Post Matric Scholarship for SC/ST/BC and minority communities etc.
- (ii) Maulana Azad National Scholarship for girl student belonging to minority community.
- (iii) Indira Gandhi Scholarship for single girl child exclusively for PG Students.
- (iv) Scholarship for minority students.
- The Dr. Anju Priya Akhouri Memorial Scholarship is for the PG topper from the botany department.
- The Dr. Prabhat Kumar Memorial Scholarship is for toppers from intermediate, undergraduate and postgraduate.
- Students who belongs to SC, ST, OBC or are handicapped, will be recommended to the governments of Bihar/Bengal/Orissa and other states as well.

== Facilities ==
=== Library ===
The Perin Mehta library is automated and provides internet service, which is available to the students at a nominal rate. Books as well as national and international journals are available. The E-Library is associated with the British Council, INFLIBNET and the American Center.

=== Travel Concessions ===
Institution rail travel concessions to facilitate travel to their homes or home regions.

=== Student Welfare Services ===
A variety of social services are available to support the students.

- Placement Cell. Provides employment placement, which has included multinational companies
- Grievance Redressal Cell
- Women's Cell
- Counselling Cell
- Cultural Cell
- Freeship Committee
- SC/ST Committee
- Internal Quality Assurance Cell
- Anti-ragging Cell as per U.G.C. Notification
- Cultural Society
- Sports Committee
- Legal Aid Clinic

=== Hostel ===
The hostel is affiliated with Youth Hostel Association of India. The organisation organizes treks and adventures at a local as well as national level. There are two hostels featuring TV, Internet, Newspaper, Magazine, Telephones and Indoor games, both on campus. The Mahadevi Verma hostel can accommodate 50 students. The CV Raman hostel can house 100 students.

=== Sports and NCC ===
Sport facilities on the campus include cricket, volleyball, archery, basketball, khokho, kabaddi, karate and indoor games. There are scholarships provided by the Sports Authority of India. Students can also join the NCC.

=== Special Features ===
- On site daycare center, serving both students and staff
- Audio-Visual Room
- Communicative English classes are conducted for the UG students during the college's three academic years.
- Water cooler facility
- Common room for girls - Under Construction
- Student feedback system
- Placement cell and counseling center
- Internet Facility in the Computer Center & in all Departments
- Education Loans provided to needy & BPL Students upon presentation of Income Certificate.

== Notable alumni ==
- Arati Bhattacharya
- G. S. Lakshmi

== See also ==
- List of institutions of higher education in Jharkhand
