= Dumka Engineering College =

College in Jharkhand, India

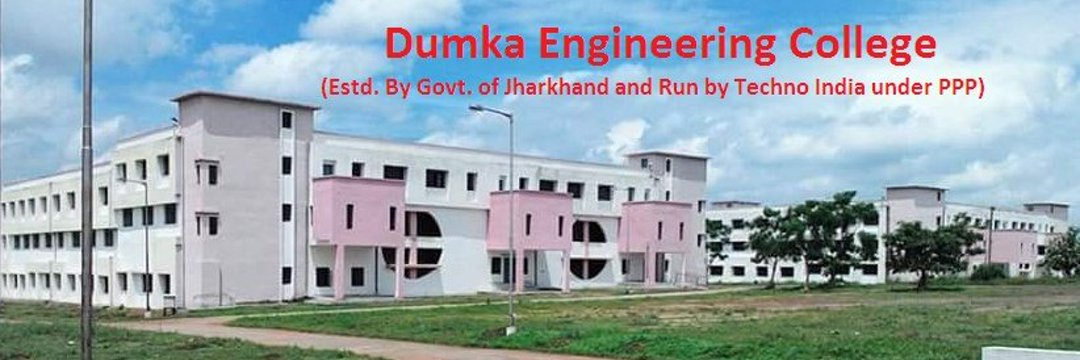
- Dumka Engineering College (overview)
- Type: PPP
- Established: 2013; 13 years ago
- Founders: Government of Jharkhand
- Accreditation: AICTE, NBA, NAAC
- Affiliations: Jharkhand University of Technology
- Principal: Ganesh Shankar
- Location: Dumka, Jharkhand, India; 24.2848°N 87.2638°E
- Campus: Sub Urban
- Website: https://www.dumkaengg.edu.in/
- Run by Techno India Group

Dumka Engineering College ( Estd. by Govt. of Jharkhand & Run by Techno India Under PPP), formerly Known as Techno India Dumka and Govt. Engineering college Dumka, is a Degree Engineering Institute established in 2013 through PPP mode (public-private partnership ) established by Government of Jharkhand, India. Managed by Techno India group.

== Location ==
Dumka is a district headquarters. The college is situated 2 km from the Dumka Bus Stand and 0.5 km from Dumka railway station. In the state Jharkhand.

== Academics ==
The institute was affiliated with Sido Kanhu Murmu University until 2017. 2018 onwards, the institute is affiliated to Jharkhand University of Technology (JUT), Ranchi, the foundations of which was laid down by the former Hon'ble President of India, Pranab Mukherjee. All courses are approved by the All India Council of Technical Education. The institute currently have five departments of engineering, three in natural sciences, a humanities department.

- Engineering Disciplines:
1. Civil engineering
2. Computer Science & Engineering
3. Electrical engineering
4. Electronics and Communication Engineering
5. Mechanical engineering
