= Amity University, Jharkhand =

University in Ranchi, Jharkhand, India

- University Logo
- Other name: AUJ
- Type: Private
- Established: 2016; 10 years ago
- Parent institution: Amity University
- Accreditation: NAAC
- Affiliations: UGC; BCI
- Chancellor: Dr. Atul Chauhan
- Vice-Chancellor: Dr. Ashok K Srivastava
- Academic staff: 80
- Administrative staff: 124
- Students: 3,500+
- Postgraduates: 1,000+
- Location: Ranchi, Jharkhand, India; 23.3479694°N 85.3260218°E
- Campus: Urban
- Website: amity.edu/ranchi/

Amity University, Jharkhand, also known as Amity University, Ranchi, is a private university located in Ranchi, Jharkhand, India. The university was established in 2016 by the Amity Education Group through the Amity University Act, 2016. It offers various undergraduate and postgraduate courses.

== See also ==
- Education in India
- List of private universities in India
- University Grants Commission (India)
- List of institutions of higher education in Jharkhand
