= Chotanagpur Law College =

Law school in Jharkhand, India

- Type: Public, Law college
- Established: 1954
- Affiliations: Ranchi University
- Principal: Pankaj Kumar Chaturvedi
- Dean: Pankaj Kumar Chaturvedi
- Students: 600
- Location: Nyay Vihar Campus, Namkum Ranchi, Jharkhand, 834010, India; 23.3199679°N 85.383961°E
- Campus: Urban
- Website: cnlawcollege.ac.in

Chotanagpur Law College (also known as C.N. Law College) is a college imparting legal education in Ranchi, Jharkhand, India. The college was established in 1954 under the tutelage of Barrister S.K. Sahay and was first affiliated to the Bihar University and thereafter to Ranchi University. This college is also approved by the Bar Council of India. The college has UGC and NAAC Accreditation.

== Courses ==
The college offers a five-years integrated B.A. LL.B. (Hons.) course, three-years LL.B. course and two years LL.M. (Master of Laws) course also. The college is starting a 5-year LL.B for students who have passed the Intermediate exams for academic year 2019. The college takes admission to all these courses through an entrance Test conducted by itself and also takes in students through the LSAT Exam.

== Notable alumni ==
Notable alumni of the college include.

- S.B. Sinha- Former Judge of the Supreme Court of India.
- M. Y. Eqbal- Former Judge of the Supreme Court of India.

== See also ==
- Education in India
- Ranchi University
- List of law schools in India
- Literacy in India
- List of institutions of higher education in Jharkhand
