= Sai Nath University =

Private university in Ranchi, Jharkhand, India

- Other name: SNU
- Motto: Inclusion, Innovation & Ethics
- Type: Private
- Established: 2012; 14 years ago
- Affiliations: UGC
- Chancellor: Dr. Chandra Prakash Agarwal
- Vice-Chancellor: Dr. S. P. Agarwal
- Academic staff: 100+
- Students: 1,000+
- Location: Ranchi, Jharkhand, India; 23.488464°N 85.407980°E
- Campus: Semi-Urban
- Colours: Royal Blue & Orange
- Website: www.sainathuniversity.com

Sai Nath University is a private university located in Ranchi, Jharkhand, India. Sai Nath University was set up in 2012 vide Sai Nath University, Jharkhand Act 2012 and is duly recognised by the University Grants Commission as a private university. Sai Nath University is approved by PCI, BCI, NCTE, AICTE, INC and State Nursing Council.

== Academics ==
Sai Nath University offers degree programs in all major disciplines including undergraduate and postgraduate education. Sai Nath University has the following academic departments:

- Faculty of Science & Technology
- Faculty of Medical Science & Research
- Faculty of Nursing
- Faculty of Agriculture
- Faculty of Education & Physical Education
- Faculty of Law & Research
- Faculty of Pharmacy
- Faculty of Management

== See also ==
- Education in India
- List of private universities in India
- List of institutions of higher education in Jharkhand
