= St. Xavier's College, Ranchi =

Religious college in Jharkhand, India

Coordinates: 23°22′4.15″N 85°19′34.32″E

- Motto: Lucens et Ardens
- Motto in English: Fire and Light
- Established: 3 July 1944; 81 years ago
- Religious affiliation: Jesuit (Roman Catholic)
- Academic affiliations: Ranchi University
- Principal: Robert Pradeep Kujur S.J.
- Students: 10,500
- Location: Jharkhand, India
- Campus: Urban
- Website: www.sxcran.org

St. Xavier's College, Ranchi is an Autonomous College affiliated to Ranchi University. It is located in the Indian state of Jharkhand. It was founded in 1944 by the Patna province of the Society of Jesus, a Catholic religious order that traces its origin to St. Ignatius of Loyola in 1540.

== History ==
St. Xavier's College, Ranchi is a Minority Educational Institution. Initially it had affiliations with Patna University. Post 1960 the affiliation was switched to Ranchi University. The University Grants Commission conferred autonomous status in 2005 and granted 'College with Potential for Excellence' status in 2006. Grade 'C++' accreditation with a rating of 3.2 out of 4 was granted by NAAC in 2013. The Intermediate section of the college is affiliated to the Jharkhand Academic Council which comes under State board of Jharkhand.

== Academics ==
The courses of study includes:

- Intermediate in Arts, Science, & Commerce
- Bachelor in Arts, Science, & Commerce
- Master in Arts, Commerce, & Computer Applications
- Bachelor in Education
- Vocational Programs in Science & Commerce
- Diploma Program
- Admission In Intermediate

Xavier Ranchi has the following academic programs:

Intermediate

- Science (I.Sc)
- Arts (I.A.)
- Commerce (I.COM.)

Bachelor of Arts (B.A.)

- English
- Hindi
- Geography
- Economics
- History
- Political Science
- Sociology

Bachelor of Science (B.Sc.)

- Physics
- Chemistry
- Botany
- Zoology
- Geology
- Statistics
- Mathematics
- Mathematics & Statistics

Bachelor of Commerce (B.Com.)

- Accounts

Self-Financed Course

- Bachelor of Arts in English Language & Literature (ELL)
- Bachelor of Arts in Journalism and Mass Communication
- Bachelor of Science in Computer Application
- Bachelor of Science in Information Technology
- Bachelor of Science in Biotechnology
- Bachelor of Commerce in Advertising & Marketing
- Bachelor of Commerce in Office Management and Secretarial Practice
- Bachelor of Commerce in Banking & Insurance
- Bachelor of Commerce in International Accounting & Finance
- Bachelor of Business Management
- Bachelor of Finance Market Operation
- Bachelor of Retail Management
- Bachelor of Construction Management
- Bachelor of Fashion Technology
- Diploma in Arts in Animation and Interior Design

Master's degree Programs

- English
- Hindi
- Geography
- Political Science
- History
- Accounts
- Journalism & Mass Comm.
- Computer Application(M.C.A)
- Chemistry
- Zoology
- Geology
- Botany

== Facilities ==
St. Xavier's College, Ranchi has a study room and library which was established in 1944. It was called 'Meletre Baraque' and was situated in front of the Principal's office. In 1960, it was shifted to the Arts Block. Thereafter in 1996 the stack room was enlarged. It currently contains about 100,000 books and journals.

Sports facilities are available in the college for volleyball, basketball, hockey, cricket, football, badminton and various indoor games.

The college campus has a fitness Gymkhana, several common rooms, four canteens and cafeterias. The college also provides hostel for boys belonging to both majority and minority or lower socio-economic culture. A church is also present in the college campus.

== Sister institution ==
St. Xavier's College, Simdega is a sister institution established by Jesuits of Ranchi province.

== See also ==
- Education in India
- Literacy in India
- List of institutions of higher education in Jharkhand
- List of Jesuit sites
