= Jharkhand Raksha Shakti University =

- Type: State university
- Established: 2016; 10 years ago
- Affiliations: UGC
- Chancellor: Governor of Jharkhand
- Vice-Chancellor: Rahul Kumar Purwar
- Location: 23.3839994°N 85.31755°E
- Campus: Urban
- Website: www.jrsu.ac.in

Jharkhand Raksha Shakti University (JRSU) is a state university located at Ranchi, Jharkhand, India. It was established by the Government of Jharkhand through the Jharkhand Raksha Shakti University Act, 2016. It offers courses in the fields of police science and security management.

== History ==
The foundation stone for the university was laid by the Minister of Defence Manohar Parrikar on 23 January 2016. The university opened on 4 October 2016 with 179 students on five courses.

== See also ==
- List of state universities in India
- List of institutions of higher education in Jharkhand
