= National University of Study and Research in Law =

Law University in Ranchi, Jharkhand, India

National University of Study and Research in Law, Ranchi
- Motto: नासतो विद्यते भावो नाभावो विद्यते सत:
- Motto in English: That which exists cannot cease to exist and that which is non-existent cannot come into existence
- Type: National Law University
- Established: 2010; 16 years ago
- Affiliations: UGC, BCI
- Chancellor: Chief Justice of Jharkhand High Court
- Vice-Chancellor: Dr. Ashok Ramappa Patil
- Rector: Governor of Jharkhand
- Visitor: Chief Justice of India
- Location: Ranchi, Jharkhand, Jharkhand, India; 23°27′8.7732″N 85°18′59.472″E
- Campus: 67 acres; Rural
- Website: www.nusrlranchi.ac.in

National University of Study and Research in Law (NUSRL) is a National Law University located in Ranchi, Jharkhand, India. It was established by a legislative act, by the State of Jharkhand (Act no. 4 of 2010) as the fourteenth National Law University of India. The statute provides for the Chief Justice of India or a Senior Supreme Court Judge to serve as the Visitor of the university.

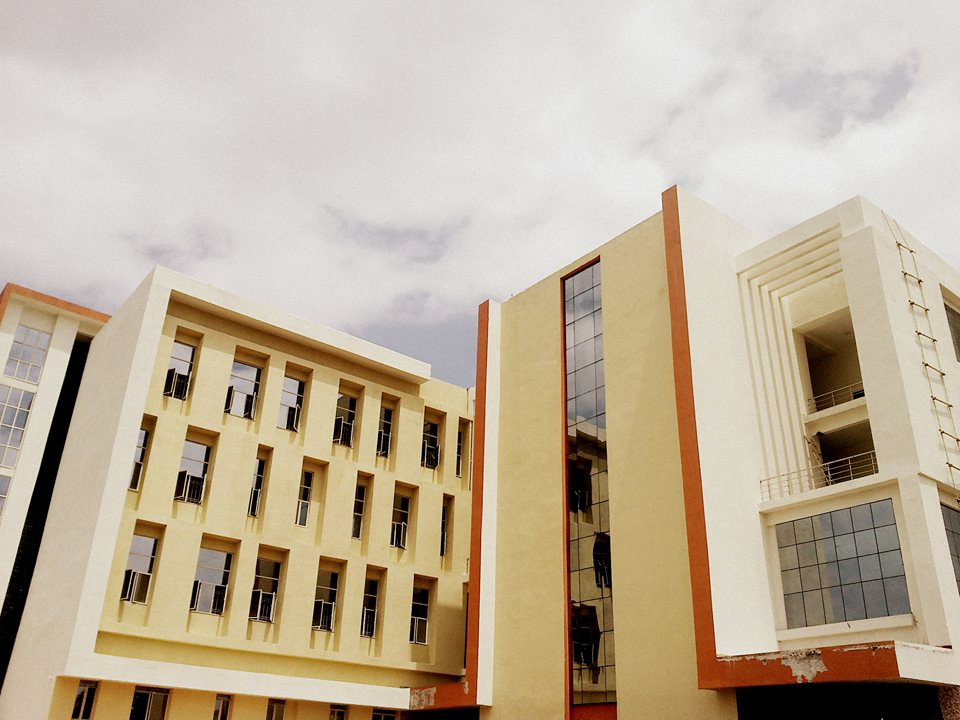
National University of Study and Research in Law Academic Block

== History ==
The university was formally inaugurated by the Chief Justice of Jharkhand High Court and Supreme Court Judge designate Justice Gyan Sudha Misra on 26 April 2010. The university is known for its highly competitive admissions, and has an acceptance rate of 0.132 %. It has an intake of around 132 students selected from a pool of around 100,000 students in its undergraduate law programme.

=== Location ===
The university is located on a 63.76-acre site at Kanke-Pithoria Road on the outskirts of Ranchi, just ahead of Ranchi Institute of Neuro-Psychiatry & Allied Sciences and Birsa Agricultural University surrounded by Outer Ranchi Ring Road.

== Academics ==
The university has 2 semesters in an academic year. Each academic year a student has to undertake 3 CATs (Continuous Assessment Test) for each subject, consisting of announced tests as well as unannounced ones. The students are also required to undertake mandatory CRE (Court Room Exercises). The curriculum also includes a mandatory research paper from the first semester.

=== Rankings ===
The university was ranked 7th in the Qs world ranking of Indian law schools and continues to remain the 12th best Law and research institute in the South East region in 2021. According to NIRF Rankings 2023 the university holds 9th position in the country amongst other National Law Universities.

== Admissions ==
Admissions to NUSRL are done through the Common Law Admission Test (CLAT). Student preference shows that the university is faring well in the league of National Law Universities and remains a priority amongst the newly open National Law Universities.

=== Undergraduate ===
NUSRL offers undergraduates a five-year integrated B.A.LL.B(Hons). program which, upon completion, qualifies the student to sit for the bar to practice law in India. The program is a mix of relevant social science subjects and law subjects. The time span for the course is 5 years divided into 10 semesters. In the first two years, the law student attends courses on English, Political Science, Philosophy, Economics, Sociology, Psychology and Legal History alongside standard legal subjects, such as Law of Torts, Law of Contracts, Constitutional law, Family Law, Criminal Law and Civil Procedure. In the latter three the curriculum consists majorly of legal subjects.

=== Postgraduate ===
At the postgraduate level, the university offers one-year LL.M and two-year Ph.D. programms, for which the admission is through CLAT PG, entrance test group discussion and oral test conducted by the university for PHD programme.

== NUSRL Library ==
The university is equipped with an extensive library covering all subjects of law. Besides legal subjects, the library also has books on social sciences. The library also has acquired subscription to various online databases such as Manupatra, HeinOnline, WestLaw India, Jstor and SCC OnLine. The university also houses a wide range of law journals.

== Moot Court Committee ==
The Moot Court Committee of the National University of Study and Research in Law (NUSRL), Ranchi, was established in 2011 with Dr. K. Syamala as its chairperson. The committee has organized and participated in several national moot court competitions. Dr. K. Syamala continues to lead the Moot Court Committee, working alongside faculty and student members.

The Moot Court Committee organized the 1st NUSRL National Trial Advocacy Competition in 2015, which included participants from 18 law universities across India. Following the inaugural event, the university hosted the 2nd NUSRL National Trial Advocacy Competition in 2017 and the 3rd edition from 17 to 20 May 2018. These events have attracted participation from various law schools nationwide.

In addition to the trial advocacy competitions, the Moot Court Committee also organizes the O.P. Jalan Memorial National Taxation Moot Court Competition. The first edition of this competition took place from 31 March to 2 April 2016, with the second edition occurring from 16 to 18 March 2018.

== The Recruitment and Placement Committee ==
This committee is the official body at NUSRL that overlooks and coordinates the recruitment of the graduating batch of students in the University. The RPC, composed of final year students, works under the supervision of Faculty Convenors to develop a robust platform for the interaction of prospective recruiters and the interested students. For efficient functioning, the RPC consists of three teams- Placement Coordination Team (PCT), Industrial Relations Team (IRT), and Alumni Relations Team (ART). The teams work in concert to assist the recruitment process and organize webinars, interactive talks and skill development workshops in collaboration with key industry experts. Lokesh Mewara and Piyush Singh are the committee members of this committee.

== Centre for Research in Intellectual Property Right ==
The centre was founded to address a need identified by scientists, lawyers, technologists, and companies. Its objective is to study patent, trademark, design, and copyright law. The CSRIPR focuses on evolving areas of intellectual property law such as the protection of software, semiconductor products, and biotechnological inventions, standardisation, and technology transfers as well as general intellectual property issues. To achieve these goals, the CSRIPR organizes interdisciplinary activities, including seminars and conferences related to IPR. The Director of the centre is Dr. M.R.S. Murthy.

== Centre for Legal Aid Programme ==
Center for Legal Aid and Program, NUSRL (CLAP) is a student-cum-faculty-run society with an aim to spread legal awareness and give real-time effective legal aid to the marginalized section of our society. CLAP was established in the very first year of the inception of the university. CLAP seeks to improve the legal scenario in the state of Jharkhand. It has organized various field trips and conducted surveys and seminars all over the State of Jharkhand so as to spread legal awareness amongst the weaker section of the society. The committee is headed by Mr. Kaushik Bagchi.

== Publication ==
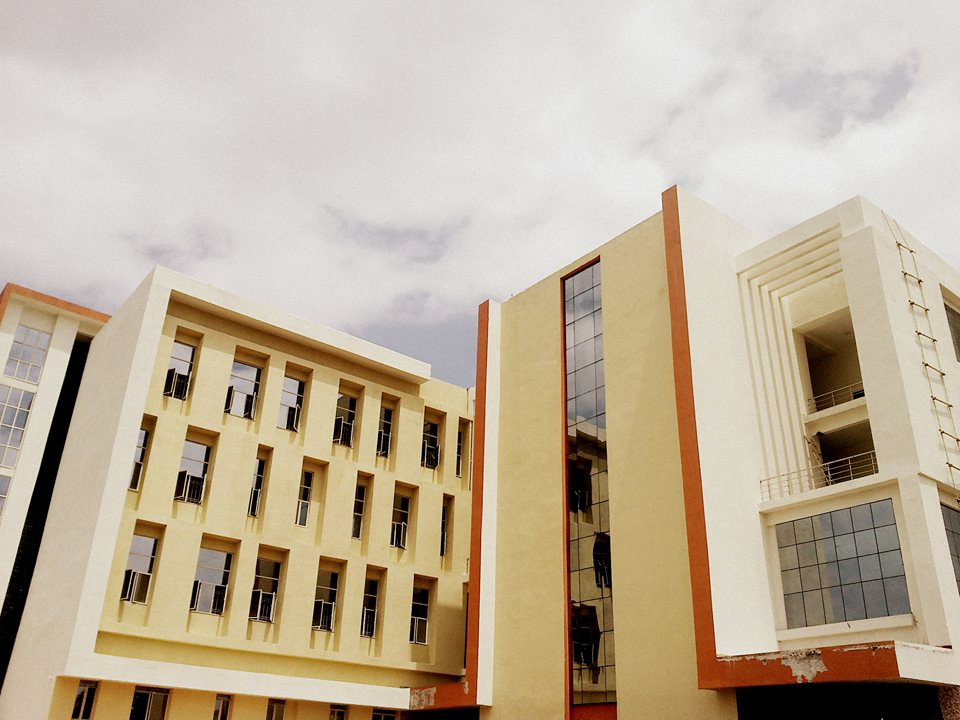
National University of Study and Research in Law Academic Block

The university annually publishes NUSRL Journal of Law and Policy. Besides this the university has also published CSRIPR Diary, Journal of Constitutional Law and Governance, NUSRL Journal of Intellectual Property Rights and many others journals.
