= National Institute of Advanced Manufacturing Technology =

NIT in Jharkhand, India

- Former names: National Institute of Foundry and Forge Technology
- Motto: नूतनं विज्ञान विश्वम् (Sanskrit)
- Motto in English: The New Science World
- Type: Public technical university
- Established: 1966; 60 years ago
- Parent institution: Ministry of Education, Government of India
- Budget: ₹26.50 crore (US$2.8 million) (FY2023–24 est.)
- Chairperson: Sham H. Arjunwadkar
- Director: Sukumar Mishra
- Academic staff: 58 (2023)
- Administrative staff: 120 (2023)
- Students: 1068 (2025)
- Undergraduates: 950 (2025)
- Postgraduates: 85 (2025)
- Doctoral students: 33 (2025)
- Location: Ranchi, Jharkhand, India; 23°17′36″N 85°18′34″E
- Campus: Urban 65 acres (26 ha)
- Nickname: NIAMTian
- Website: www.niamt.ac.in

National Institute of Advanced Manufacturing Technology (NIAMT) formerly known as the National Institute of Foundry and Forge Technology (NIFFT) is a premier public technical research institution in Ranchi, Jharkhand, India. It is a Deemed to be University under the Ministry of Education (MoE), Government of India. It is one of the autonomous institutes under the NIT+ system in India.

It was established in 1966 by the Government of India in collaboration with UNDP – UNESCO to provide qualified engineers and specialists for running foundry and forge industries. It is a National Institute as well as Deemed to be University and is Centrally Funded by Ministry of Education (MoE), Government of India.

The institute offers postdoctoral, doctoral and master's program at the graduate level and bachelor's program and advanced diploma courses at the undergraduate level. The objectives of the institute have broadened to meet the present need of the industries, with the introduction of departments of Manufacturing Engineering in 1985, Materials and Metallurgical Engineering in 1998, Mechanical Engineering in 2020 and Electronics and Computer Engineering in 2021.

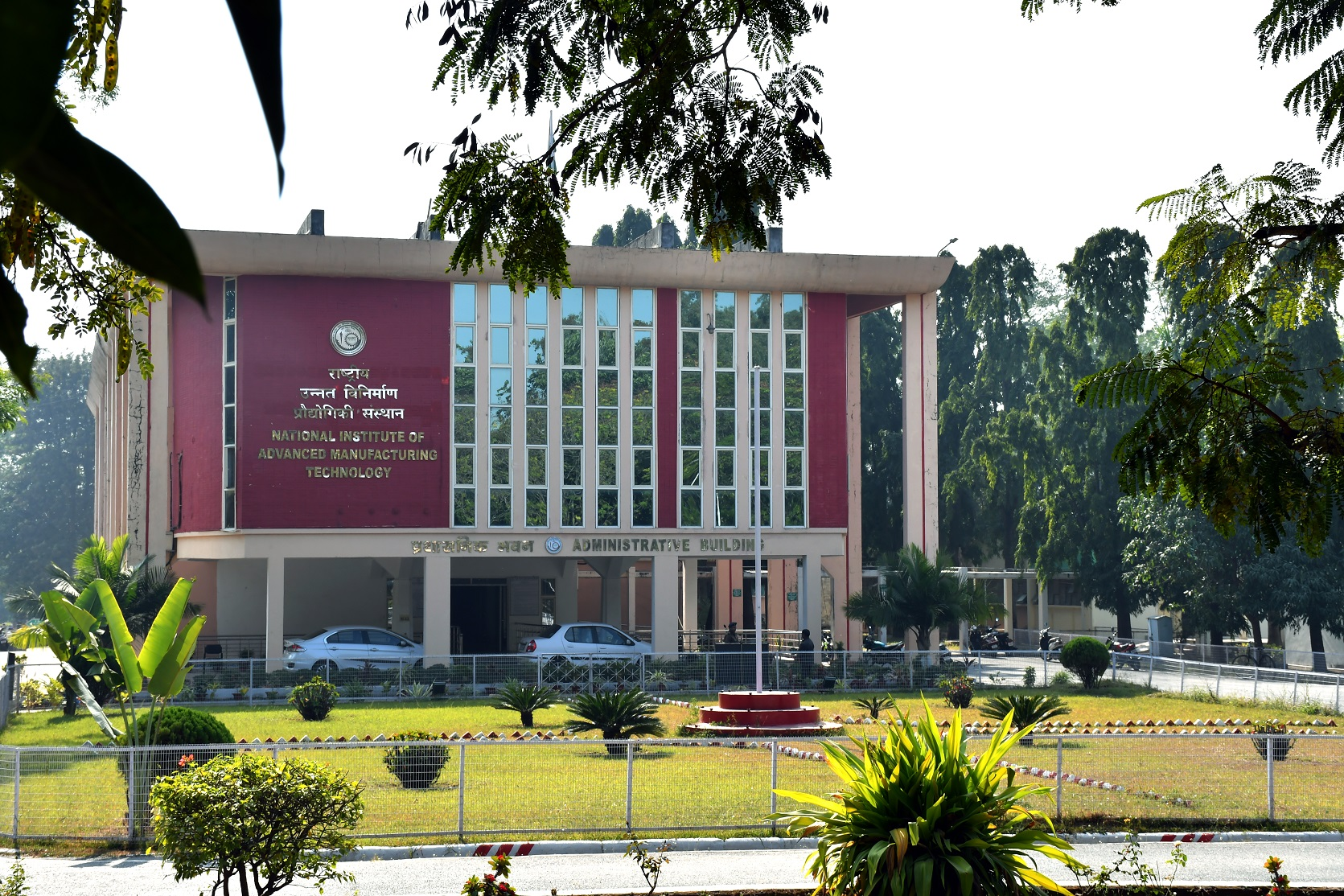
NIAMT Ranchi Administrative Building

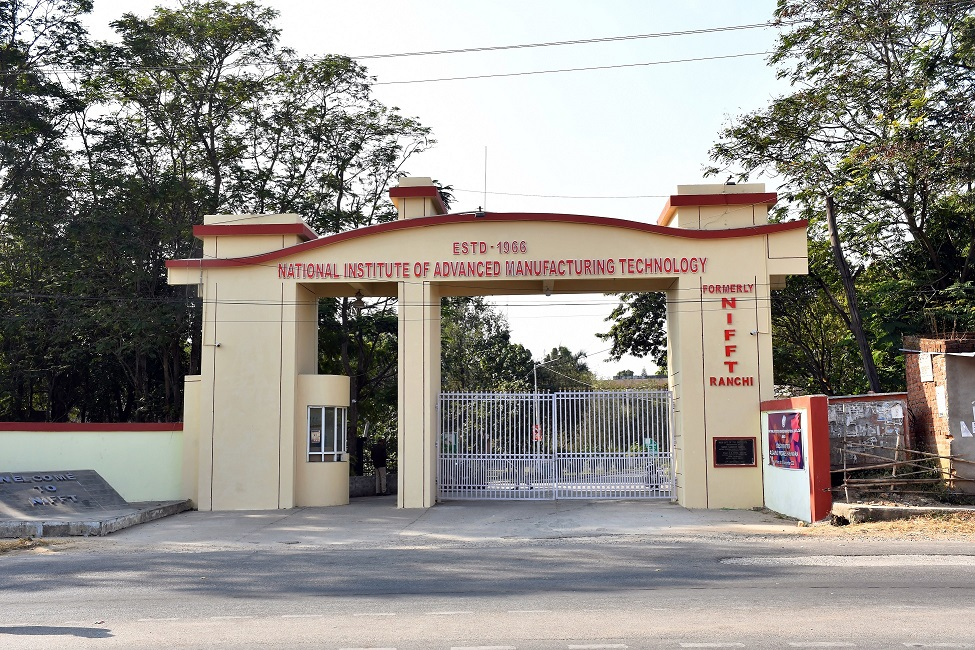
NIAMT Ranchi Main Gate

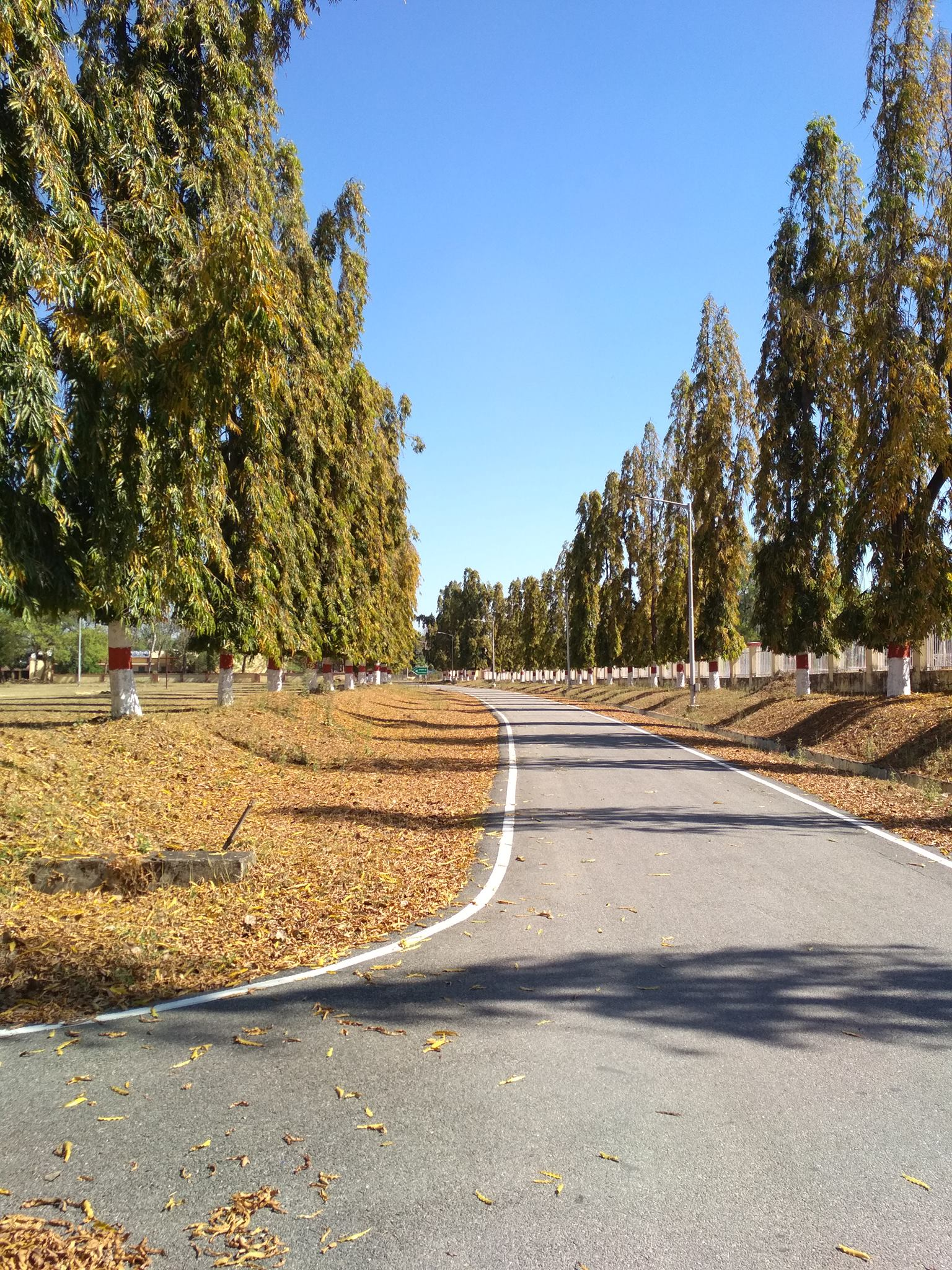

Apart from training and placement of students, NIAMT also provides consultancy, documentation and information retrieval services in manufacturing engineering, industrial metallurgy and in foundry and forge sectors and many more core sectors all over the world.

== Location ==
Located in Hatia, which is about 7.4 km from Ranchi. Distance from Ranchi Airport: 6 km Distance from Ranchi Railway Station: 10 km Distance from Hatia Railway Station: 1.1 km and 140 km from Chaibasa.

== History ==
In consonance with the general guidelines of UNESCO (1962) regarding establishment of specialized institutes, National Institute of Foundry and Forge Technology (NIFFT) was created in 1966 under the UNDP program to cater to the need of a large number of technicians in industry. The particular emphasis was on foundry and forge technology to meet the demand of trained manpower in the primary metal manufacturing sectors like automobile, heavy engineering, machine and component manufacturing etc. Two carefully designed advanced diploma courses, namely foundry and forge technology, were offered.

In view to push forward the knowledge boundary, four M.Tech programs were introduced in the core areas of foundry and forge technology. Subsequently, two B.Tech. programs, one in Manufacturing engineering in 1992, and other in Metallurgical and materials engineering in 1998. The courses were affiliated to the Ranchi University. The affiliation was later granted by the Jharkhand University of Technology from 2018. In 2020, Manufacturing Engineering was replaced by Mechanical Engineering. On 1 July 2021, the university grants commission approved the institute for the Deemed University status under section 3 of the UGC Act, 1956. On 23 February 2024, the institute got upgraded as Deemed to be University by the Ministry of Education, Government of India. Now NIAMT has no affiliation with any other university Ranchi University or Jharkhand University of Technology also as NIAMT itself have full autonomy or independence in administration and operations for being Deemed University. All award degrees, examinations and other academic certifications will be provided directly by NIAMT itself and all operations also controlled and managed by NIAMT University itself as it cannot have other institutes affiliated to it and has a single educational institute under its wing.

In 2022, two new B.Tech courses Computer Engineering and Production and Industrial Engineering is introduced to reinforce the core framework of foundry and forging technology with the knowledge of materials and manufacturing to cater the emerging need of the industries. The doctoral program for manufacturing engineering began in 2006.

The institute currently offers doctorates in 5 departments, 4 master's degrees, 4 bachelor's degrees and 2 advanced diploma courses.

== Campus ==
The NIAMT campus is located on NH-75 around 7.2 km from Ranchi. It is around 2.2 km (1.4 mi) from Hatia railway station and around 10 km (6.2 mi) from Ranchi Junction railway station. The campus is around 6.4 km (4.0 mi) from Birsa Munda Airport making it easily accessible via rail as well as airways.

The campus is spread over 65 acres (26 ha). It is located in the town of Hatia.

It houses the administrative building, academic buildings and halls of residence for students. The faculty residential area, grounds, library, auditorium, laboratories and workshops are other areas on its campus.

=== Hostels ===
As NIAMT all academic courses are fully residential, NIAMT has five boys hostels namely Nirala Chatrawas, Homi J. Bhabha Chatrawas, J. C. Bose Chatrawas, M. Visvesvaraya Chatrawas, Vikram A. Sarabhai Chatrawas and one girls' hostel, Kalpana Chawla Chatrawas, whose total holding capacity is around 1200 students, in single-bed and double-bed rooms in ADC, B.Tech., M.Tech., and PhD courses. Each hostel has sports facilities such as TT tables, football ground, basketball ground, badminton court, cricket ground, carrom boards and volleyball courts apart from the common college facilities.

Nirala Chatrawas, J. C. Bose Chatrawas and M. Visvesvaraya Chatrawas have canteens inside the hostel. The other hostels also have a student's mess and canteen nearby.

=== Sports facilities ===
The college provides sporting facilities to its students. These include a cricket ground, volleyball courts, table tennis, football and shuttle badminton.

=== Information Technology Centre (ITC)/ CAD-CAM Centre/ Centralized Computer Centre(CCC) ===
The institute provides many computer facilities. These include software like DEFORM, PROCAST, UNIGRAPHICS, CATIA, AUTODESK Inventor Professional (Mechanical and Electrical), MATLAB and also servers, desktops, workstations and terminals. CAD Center/Computer Center and the E-library provide students with internet access with fully Wi-Fi enabled campus and hostel rooms also with LAN/WAN support.

== Departments ==
NIAMT has the following six departments:

- Department of Mechanical Engineering
- Department of Materials and Metallurgical Engineering
- Department of Electronics and Computer Engineering
- Department of Foundry and Forge Technology
- Department of Applied Sciences and Humanities
- Department of Environmental Engineering

== Academics ==
The institute conducts educational programmes leading to the award of Advanced Diploma Course Certificates (ADC), Bachelor of Technology (B.Tech.), Master of Technology (M.Tech.) and Doctor of philosophy (PhD) and post Doctoral. The institutes will launch Integrated B, Tech-M.Tech (5 years) course also in near future.

=== Laboratories and Workshop ===
The institute has laboratories and workshop for carrying out practical study work by the students and for extending testing facilities pertaining to foundry, forge, metallurgical analysis and materials characterization to the outside organizations on payment basis. The institute houses laboratories such as sand laboratory, metallography laboratory, flexible manufacturing system (FMS) laboratory, non-destructive and mechanical testing laboratory, composite laboratory, spectroscopy laboratory, environmental monitoring and pollution control laboratory, metrology laboratory, and a forging laboratory. The institute also houses workshop buildings which include carpentry, foundry and forge shops as well as graphics rooms and other laboratories

=== Library and Documentation Centre ===
The four-storeyed library's collection includes over 31000 books, 3560 bound volumes and 215 current periodicals in Manufacturing, Metallurgy, Materials Science and allied areas. In addition, it has CD-ROMs on various aspects of engineering, up-to-date standards both Indian and foreign, technical films, tapes, slides, microfilms, microfiches etc. OPAC facility to the user through the software 'LIBSYS" is OPAC facility to the user through the software 'LIBSYS" is also available.

== Admissions ==
For admission into the Advanced Diploma Courses (ADC), the institute self conducts examination. The undergraduate students for Bachelor's degree at the institute are selected through the competitive exam, completely based on JEE-Mains conducted Joint Entrance Examination by NTA. For Master of Technology (M.Tech.) courses admission is through Graduate Aptitude Test in Engineering (GATE). For the PhD course, admission is through interview and self examination held at campus at the beginning of every semester.

Admission of B. Tech Students is through JEE Main (Admission through common NIT+ system counseling CSAB/JOSAA)

Admission of M Tech students is through CCMT (valid GATE score)

Admission of Advanced Diploma students through All India Entrance Test conducted by NIAMT Ranchi itself.

== Rankings and reputation ==
University and college rankings

Engineering – India
- NIRF (2021): 115
- NIRF (2022): 150
- NIRF (2023): 151-200

The National Institutional Ranking Framework (NIRF) ranked it 115 among engineering colleges in 2021. In 2022, NIAMT ranked 150th in NIRF Engineering category and in 2023 it was in the rank band of 151-200 .

== Life at NIAMT ==
NIAMT has many student clubs which conduct many technical and cultural events throughout the year. These include the SAC (Students Activity Centre), SAE Club, Technical Club, IEDC (Innovation and Entrepreneurship Development Cell), NIAMT Cricket Club, NIAMT Football Club, NIAMT Volleyball Club, NIAMT Chess Club, NIAMT Badminton Club, NIAMT Table Tennis Club, The NIAMT Ensemble (Music Club), Anagha (Dance and Drama club), Nukkad Team, Photography Club, etc.

=== Jinks ===
Jinks is the annual youth cultural fest organized by the Students' Gymkhana committee of NIAMT, held in last of February every year since 2008. The festival spans three days and comprises more than forty events. It also collaborate other technical institutes also in this fest.

=== Pranav ===
Pranav is the inherent Technological fest.

=== Mission Kartavya Foundation ===
It is a social welfare program, formed by NIAMT students community that aims to help the poor and unfortunate by providing free education. Started in 2015 with the motto "For it is in giving that we receive" by the students of NIAMT, the program helped more than five hundred people of Ranchi in its first edition. The year 2016 saw the involvement of another educational institution from Ranchi, Central University of Jharkhand, in this social work. The collection and distribution of the clothes is managed by the student from the institutions. The cloth collection drive will be starts from mid October and will extend through the month till the first week of November. The distribution of the clothes will take place after the collected clothes have been sorted and filtered according to their fitness to be worn. On 13 November 2016 the clothes were distributed in various orphanages and old age homes in Ranchi. Cultural events for orphaned children on 14 November 2016, on the occasion of Children's day was also held at NIAMT, Ranchi.

==== Pranav Priyadarshi Memorial Intra Sports Tournament ====
This is the intra college tournament of NIAMT, Ranchi. In the past years, games like Badminton, chess, volleyball and football has been added as only cricket was the lead game in the tournament. This is generally held in the month of April to help students participate in sports apart from other chores and studies.

==== RASHTRIYA EKTA DIWAS ====
For the birth anniversary of Iron Man of India, Sardar Vallabhbhai Patel this festival celebrated in the institute as “Rashtriya Ekta Diwas”- “National Unity Day”.

==== SADBHAVNA ====
Sadbhavana is an annual sports event held at NIAMT, Ranchi. The event includes a cricket tournament, football, volleyball, badminton, table tennis, athletics, chess, carrom, and dodge ball.

- The tournament is meant to promote cooperation between newer and former batches of the stream.
- The Sadbhavana Sports Event is held with thrilling energy.
- Every moment of the Sadbhavana Sports Event is a testament to sportsmanship.

==== SWACHHTA PAKHWADA ====
Swachhta Pakhwada started from 1 September with the day celebrated as “Clean Campus Day”

==== NIAMT PREMIER LEAGUE ====
As biggest sport fest, NIAMT Premier League (NPL) is a cricket tournament, a glimpse of Indian Premier League in the premises of NIAMT, Ranchi.

=== College Clubs ===
==== Anagha ====
The official Dance and Drama club of NIAMT Ranchi the club formed to showcase talent of dance and drama for not only special occasion but also all college fests.

Ensemble

The official Sole Music Club formed by college students for different kind of Instruments and music, rhythm. Collaboration with IIT Kharagpur Spring fest event.

==== EDC ====
Entrepreneurship Development Cell, the team of Startup enthusiasts to foster the sprit of entrepreneurship in the college campus.

Arts and Craft Club

NIAMT PHOTOGRAPHIC SOCIETY

FILM PRODUCTION SOCIETY (FPS)

NIAMT Cricket, Football, chess and Volleyball Club

NIAMT Racing Club

== In popular culture ==
Parts of the Punjabi movie Dakuaan Da Munda were shot at NIAMT.
