= Gossner College =

College affiliated to Ranchi University

- Motto: Arise and Uplift
- Type: Private
- Established: 1971; 55 years ago
- Founder: Rt. Reverend Nirmal Minz
- Affiliations: Ranchi University
- Principal: S. K. Ecka
- Academic staff: 120+
- Students: 5,000+
- Location: Club Road, Niral Enem Horo Marg, Kanka, Ranchi, Jharkhand, 834001, India; 23.35519°N 85.3248443°E
- Campus: Urban
- Website: http://www.gcran.org/

Gossner College is one of oldest institutions formed by the Gossner Evangelical and Lutheran Church. It is a minority college affiliated to Ranchi University.

== History ==
Governed by Gossner Evangelical and Lutheran Church of Chotanagpur and Assam was established in 1971 with the prime objective of giving the Tribal Christian young men and women as well as socially, economically backward and underprivileged and privileged communities of this region, namely the Scheduled Tribes, the Scheduled Castes and other backward classes an opportunity of higher education in a Christian atmosphere. It is one of the premier centres of higher education in the state of Jharkhand. It provides Intermediate and Undergraduate Learning Programmes in science, commerce and arts.

== See also ==
- Education in India
- Ranchi University
- Literacy in India
- List of institutions of higher education in Jharkhand
