= Pragyan International University =

University in Ranchi, Jharkhand, India

- Motto: Education, Empowerment, Enlightenment
- Type: Private university
- Established: 2016; 10 years ago
- Affiliations: UGC
- Chancellor: Suresh Kumar Agarwal
- President: Chandan Agarwal
- Location: Ranchi, Jharkhand, India; 23.358°N 85.324°E
- Nickname: Pragyan International University
- Website: Official Website

Pragyan International University is a university in India established in 2016 by the Government of Jharkhand State.Earlier the university was accredited and recognised by the University Grants Commission under the section of 2(f) of UGC, Govt of India Act, 1956. The campus and the head office of the university are located in Ranchi, Jharkhand. The Jharkhand Gazette also approved the segment of Pragyan International University under State Government Approval Act No 11 of 2016.

[T]he Pragyan International University has not come into existence even after establishment in the year 2016 and teaching- learning have not started. In view of above, the stakeholders including student community is informed that the name of Pragyan International University, Ranchi, Jharkhand has been removed from the UGC list of universities under Section 2(f) of UGC Act, 1956.
