= Sarala Birla University =

Private university in Jharkhand, India

- Other name: SBU
- Type: Private
- Established: 2017; 9 years ago
- Affiliations: UGC
- Chancellor: Jayashree Mohta
- Vice-Chancellor: Dr. Jeganathan Chockalingam
- Academic staff: 100+
- Students: 1,000+
- Location: Ara, Ranchi, Jharkhand, India; 23.3468°N 85.4154°E
- Campus: Urban
- Website: sbu.ac.in

Sarala Birla University (SBU) is a private university located in the Birla Knowledge City in the Ara, about 10 kilometres (6.2 mi) from Ranchi on the Ranchi-Purulia highway, in the Namkum block of Ranchi, Jharkhand, India. The university was established by Bharat Arogya and Gyan Mandir through the Sarla Birla University Act, 2017 which was passed by the Jharkhand Legislative Assembly on 3 February 2017 following a letter of intent in November 2016. It is named after Sarala Birla.

== See also ==
- Education in India
- List of private universities in India
- List of institutions of higher education in Jharkhand
