= Arka Jain University =

Private university in Jharkhand, India

- Official University Logo
- Other name: AJU
- Type: Private
- Established: 2017; 9 years ago
- Accreditation: NAAC (A Grade)
- Academic affiliations: UGC; PCI; BCI
- Chancellor: Dr. Chenraj Roychand
- Vice-Chancellor: Dr. Easwaran Iyer
- Academic staff: 120
- Administrative staff: 150
- Students: 5,000+
- Undergraduates: 3,250+
- Postgraduates: 1,456
- Doctoral students: 568
- Location: Jamshedpur, Jharkhand, India; 22.8041103°N 86.180216°E
- Campus: Urban
- Website: Official Website

Arka Jain University (AJU) is a private university located in Gamharia, Seraikela Kharsawan district, Jamshedpur, Jharkhand, India. It was established under Arka Jain University Act on 14 July 2017 and affiliated from University Grants Commission (India).

== Academics ==
Arka Jain University has five degree-granting schools that offer undergraduate and postgraduate programs in Engineering & IT, Commerce & Management, Health & Allied Science, Humanities & Law as well as one degree-granting school that offer doctoral programs in Research; graduate and postgraduate programs in Engineering, Computer Science, Pharmacy, Optometry, Vocation, Biotechnology, Fashion Designing, Journalism & Mass Communication, Business, Commerce, Management, and Integrated Law course; and doctoral degrees in the Commerce and Management, English & Mass Communication.

== Admissions ==
AJU Common Entrance Test (AJU CET), a national level entrance test is conducted by the university every year to select bright students in selected course. The test is being conducted for undergraduate and postgraduate programs offered through its constituent institutes/schools.

== Affiliation and accreditation ==
Like all universities in India, Arka Jain University is approved by the University Grants Commission (UGC). Conduct to the school of pharmacy is approved by the Pharmacy Council of India (PCI) and the school of law is approved by the Bar Council of India (BCI).

== See also ==
- Education in India
- List of institutions of higher education in Jharkhand
- List of private universities in India
- University Grants Commission (India)
- Amity University, Noida
