= Birsa Agricultural University =

Agricultural University in Ranchi, India

Coordinates: 23.4456°N 85.3175°E

- Type: Public
- Established: 1981; 44 years ago
- Chancellor: Governor of Jharkhand
- Vice-Chancellor: Dr. S. C. Dubey
- Location: Ranchi, Jharkhand, India
- Campus: Urban
- Affiliations: UGC
- Website: www.bauranchi.org

Birsa Agricultural University is an agricultural university at Kanke, Ranchi in the Indian state of Jharkhand. It was established on 26 June 1981, after its formal inauguration by Prime Minister Indira Gandhi. The University is named in honor of Birsa Munda, a prominent tribal freedom fighter and folk hero.

== Overview ==
Its primary objective is to develop area specific technologies and manpower in the fields of agriculture, animal husbandry and forestry for the development of the plateau region of Jharkhand. In addition, economic uplifting of tribal and other backward class population of the region is a priority. The programmes and activities of education, research and extension are carried out through various faculties.

== Faculties ==
- Faculty of Agriculture
- Faculty of Veterinary Science & Animal Husbandry
- Faculty of Forestry
- Faculty of Dairy Technology
- Faculty of fisheries science
- Faculty of Horticulture
- Faculty of Biotechnology (PG)
- Faculty of agribusiness management (PG)

== Colleges ==
- Ranchi Agriculture College, Ranchi (1955)
- Ranchi Veterinary College (1961)
- College of forestry, Ranchi (1981)
- College of Bio-Technology, Ranchi
- College of Fisheries Science, Gumla
- Rabindra Nath Tagore Agriculture College, Deoghar
- Agriculture College, Garhwa
- Tilka Manjhi Agriculture College, Godda
- College of Horticulture, Chaibasa
- College of Agricultural Engineering, Ranchi
- Phulo-Jhano Murmu College of Dairy Technology
- Centre of Agribusiness Management, Ranchi

== See also ==
- List of institutions of higher education in Jharkhand
