= Kolhan University =

University in Jharkhand, India

- University Logo
- Other name: KU
- Type: Public State University
- Established: 2009; 17 years ago
- Accreditation: NAAC
- Affiliations: UGC
- Chancellor: Governor of Jharkhand
- Vice-Chancellor: Dr. Anjila Gupta
- Academic staff: 186
- Administrative staff: 260
- Students: 10,000+
- Undergraduates: 6,450+
- Postgraduates: 3,480+
- Doctoral students: 2,400+
- Location: Chaibasa, West Singhbhum, Jharkhand, India
- Campus: Urban
- Website: https://www.kolhanuniversity.ac.in

Kolhan University is a public university located in Chaibasa, in the West Singhbhum district of Jharkhand, India. The university offers both undergraduate and postgraduate courses in various streams and have 20 constituent colleges and 34 affiliated colleges across three districts of Jharkhand.

== Colleges ==
Its jurisdiction initially extends over 3 districts - Seraikela Kharsawan, East Singhbhum, West Singhbhum. It has its jurisdiction over entire Kolhan Division now.

=== Affiliated Colleges ===
- A.J.K. College, Chakulia
- B.D.S.L. Mahila College, Ghatsila
- GIIT Professional College, Jamshedpur
- J. K. S. College, Jamshedpur
- J. K. M. College of Management Science And Commerce, Salboni
- Karim City College (CPE Status by UGC), Jamshedpur
- Mrs KMPM Vocational College, Jamshedpur
- Noamundi College, Noamundi
- Patamda Degree College, Jalla
- St. Augustin College, Manoharpur
- X.I.T.E, Gamharia, Seraikela Kharsawan
- Ashu Kisku Memorial & Rabi Kisku Teachers' Training Institute, Chandil
- D.B.M.S. College Of Education, Kadma, Jamshedpur
- Institute for Education, Seraikela Kharsawan
- Jamini Kalyani Mahato College of Management Science Commerce (B.Ed for Women), Salboni
- Jamini Kanta B.Ed College, Salboni
- Madhusudan Mahto Teachers Training College, Chakradharpur
- MBNS Institute of Education, Asanbani, Jamshedpur
- Rambha College of Education, Gitilata, Tata-Hata Main Road
- R.K.M. Vocational Training Institute, Jamshedpur
- Swami Vivekanand College of Education, Salboni
- Awadh Dental College, Jamshedpur
- Mahatma Gandhi Memorial Medical College, Jamshedpur
- College of Nursing, Tata Main Hospital, Jamshedpur

=== Constituent Colleges ===
- Abdul Bari Memorial College, Jamshedpur
- Baharagora College, Baharagora
- Degree College, Jagannathpur
- Degree College, Kharsawan
- Degree College, Majhgaon
- Degree College, Manoharpur
- Ghatsila College, Ghatsila
- G.C. Jain Commerce College, Chaibasa
- Jamshedpur Co-operative College, Jamshedpur
- Jamshedpur Co-operative Law College, Jamshedpur
- Jamshedpur Worker's College, Jamshedpur
- J.L.N. College, Chakradharpur
- K.S. College, Saraikela
- Lal Bahadur Shastri Memorial College, Jamshedpur
- Mahila College, Chaibasa
- Mahila Mahavidyalaya College, Kharsawan
- Model Mahavidyalaya, Kharsawan
- Singhbhum College, Chandil
- Tata College, Chaibasa
- The Graduate School College for Women's, Jamshedpur
