= Jharkhand University of Technology =

Higher education institute

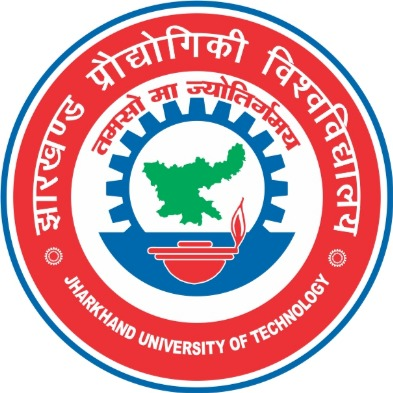
- University Logo
- Other name: JUT
- Type: State University
- Established: 2011; 15 years ago
- Accreditation: NAAC
- Affiliations: UGC
- Chancellor: Governor of Jharkhand
- Vice-Chancellor: Dharmendra Kumar Singh
- Academic staff: 360
- Administrative staff: 456
- Students: 10,000+
- Undergraduates: 8,326+
- Postgraduates: 2,400+
- Doctoral students: 1,250+
- Location: Ranchi, Jharkhand, India; 23°18′55.2″N 85°22′30.5″E
- Campus: Urban
- Website: jutranchi.ac.in

Jharkhand University of Technology (JUT) is an autonomous body intended to impart higher, technical education and skill development and other such programs in the state of Jharkhand, India.

== History ==
Jharkhand University of Technology (JUT), Ranchi was established by the Jharkhand University of Technology, ACT, 2011 (Jharkhand ACT 18, 2015), published vide gazette No.-815 date 8 December 2015. The whole of Jharkhand shall be the territorial jurisdiction under the JUT, Ranchi. JUT is intended to promote the creation of a Centre of Excellence in education and research in science, Technology, Engineering and Management, Town Planning, Pharmacy, Applied Arts and Crafts, Applied Science and such other programmes or areas as the central Government may in consultation with the All India Council for Technical Education by notification in the Gazette declare and need of Jharkhand. The mission of establishing JUT was to bring all the polytechnic and the technical colleges of state under one umbrella and increase the number of universities and impact quality education.

Earlier, State Board of Technical Education, Jharkhand called SBTEJ or SBTE, Jharkhand was responsible for formulating new course or developing curriculum for advancement of technical education.

The foundation stone of the new building for Jharkhand University of Technology was laid by the Hon'ble President of India Pranab Mukherjee on 9 January 2016.

== Organization and administration ==
=== Governance ===
The following are the authorities of the University namely, (a) The Governing Body (b) The Executive Council (c) The Finance Council (d) The Academic Council; and (e) Such other authorities as may be declared by the Statutes to be Authorities of the University.

The President of India is the Visitor of the University. The Governor of Jharkhand cum Chancellor is the ceremonial head of the university while the executive powers rest with the Vice-chancellor. The Governing Body, The Executive Council, The Academic Council and the Finance Council are the administrative authorities of the University.

The Governing Body is the supreme authority of the University and has the power to review, the broad policies and programmes of the University and to suggest measures for the improvement and development of the University; The Executive Council is the highest executive body of the University. The Academic Council is the highest academic body of the University and is responsible for the co-ordination and exercising general supervision over the academic policies of the University. It has the right to advise the Executive Council on all academic matters. The Finance Committee is responsible for recommending financial policies, goals, and budgets.

The first Chancellor was Draupadi Murmu, former Minister of State with independent charge for Commerce and Transport. Gopal Pathak was the first Vice-Chancellor.

== Location ==
The institute is located at Sirkha Toli, Science & Technology Campus (In front of Military Campus), Namkum-Tupudana Road, Ranchi, Jharkhand-834010.
