= Charhi (disambiguation) =

Charhi may refer to:

- Charhi, a census town in Churchu CD Block in Hazaribagh Sadar subdivision of Hazaribagh district in the Indian state of Jharkhand
  - Charhi railway station, a station on the Koderma-Hazaribagh-Barkakana line in Churchu (community development block), Hazaribagh district, Jharkhand serving Charhi and nearby areas
- Liraz Charhi (born 1978), Israeli actress, singer and dancer
