= Laddu =

Spherical sweet from the Indian subcontinent

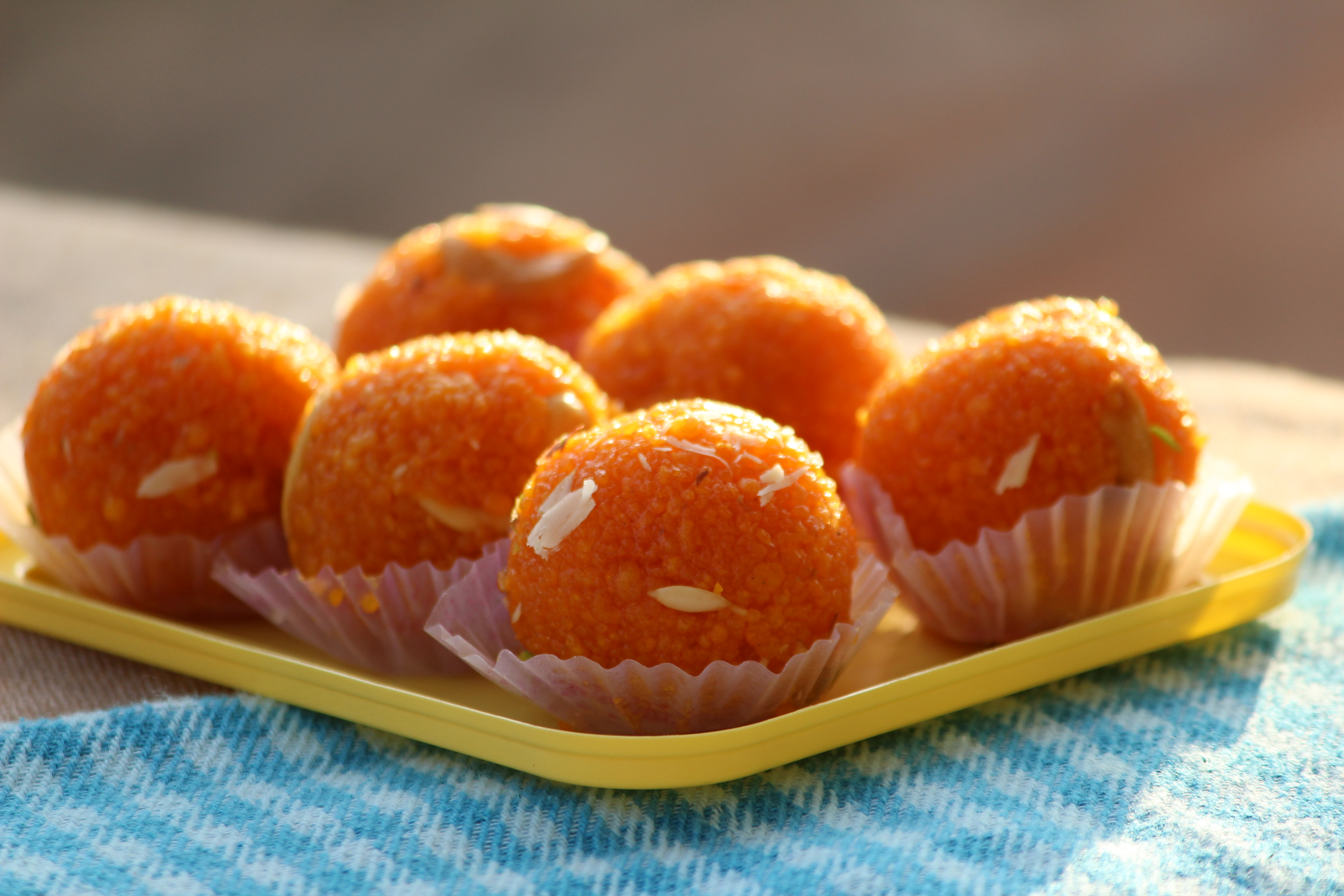
- Type: Sweet
- Region or state: Indian subcontinent, Caribbean
- Main ingredients: Flour, sugar, ghee, dry fruits
- Variations: Gram flour, rava

Laddu, or laddoo, is a spherical sweet from the Indian subcontinent made of various ingredients and sugar syrup or jaggery. It has been described as "perhaps the most universal and ancient of Indian sweets".

Laddus are often served during celebrations and religious festivals, especially those associated with the Hindu deity Ganesha.

== History and etymology ==
The word laddu is derived from a Sanskrit term meaning "small ball".

In the 3rd–4th century Sanskrit medical text Sushruta Samhita, ladduka are described as small balls of jaggery, peanuts, and sesame seeds coated with honey. These balls were used as an antiseptic and to deliver medication.

However, the first documented mention of laddu as a sweet is in the 11th-century Western Indian cookbook Lokopakara. It gives a recipe for making laddus with shavige (rice vermicelli), ghee, and sugar syrup, which were formed into balls and fried in ghee. The 15th-century Indian cookbook Nimatnama-i-Nasiruddin-Shahi gives several recipes for laddus made with white flour, dried fruits, rosewater, camphor, and musk.

== Varieties ==
=== Besan laddu ===
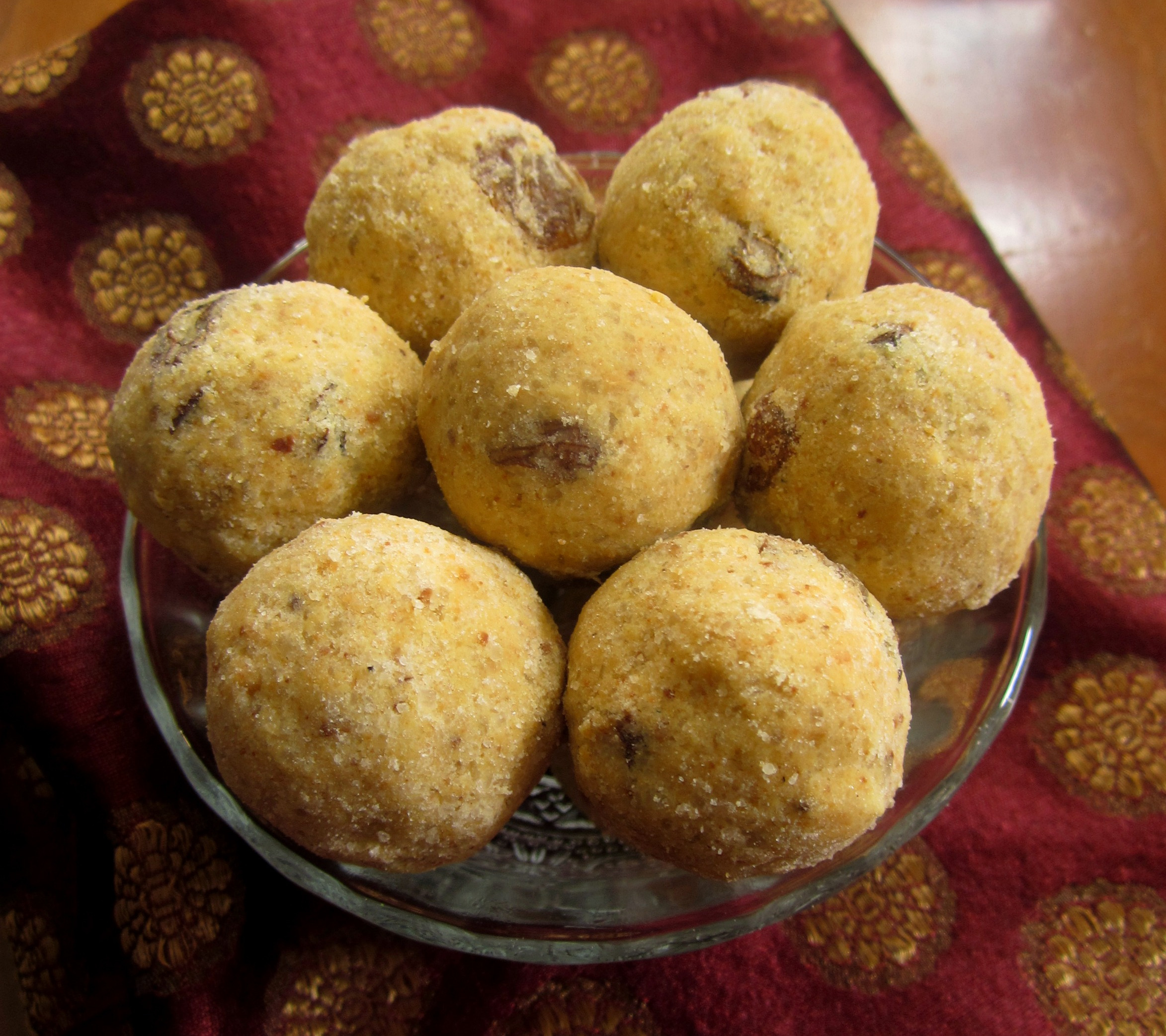
Besan (chickpea flour) laddus

Besan laddu is the most common variety. To prepare it, besan (chickpea flour) is fried in hot ghee (clarified butter). Sugar and cardamom powder are then mixed in. The mixture is formed into balls and allowed to cool and solidify.

=== Motichoor laddu ===
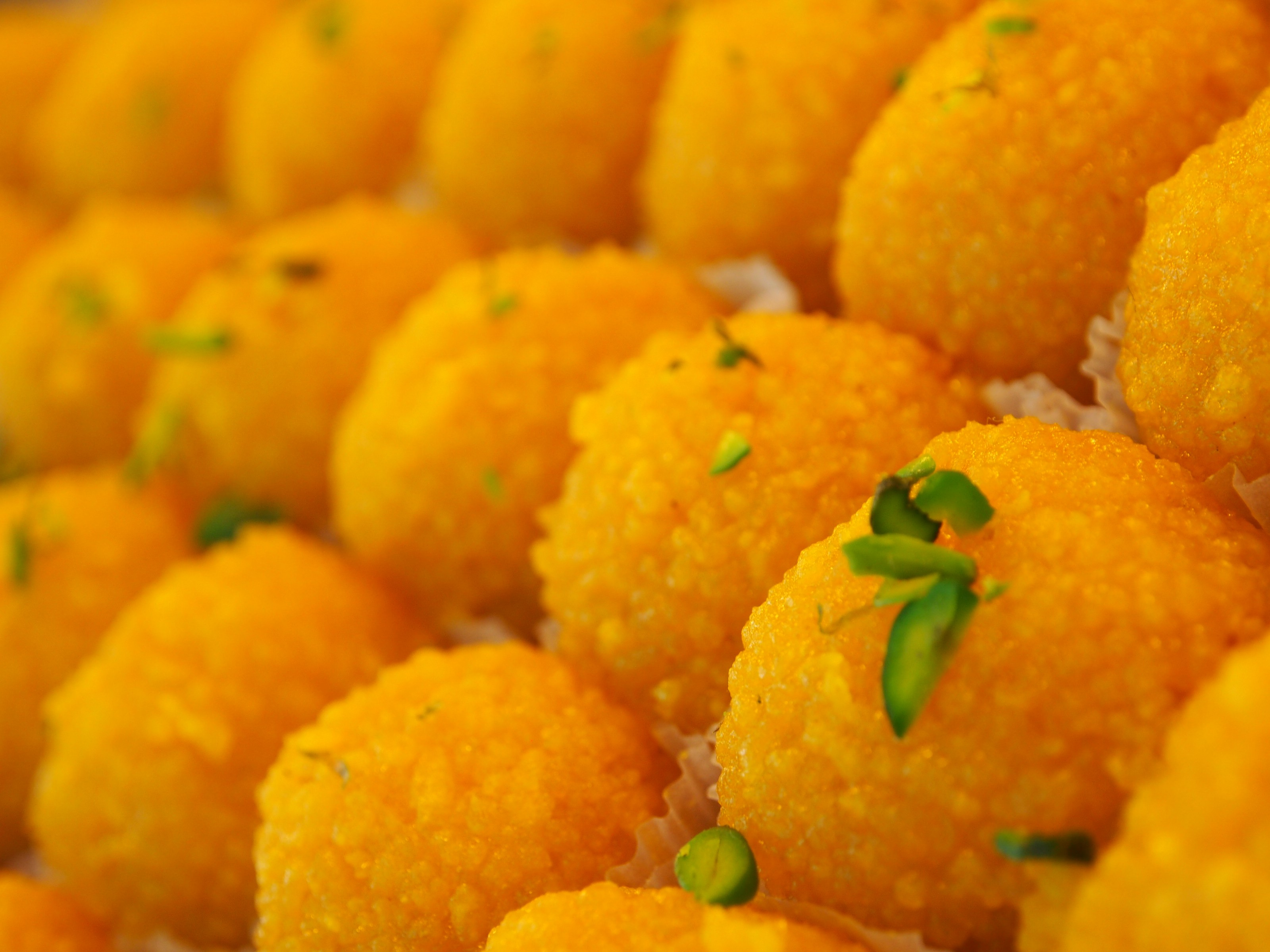
Motichoor laddus

Motichoor ("crushed pearls" in Hindi) laddu is made from boondi, tiny fried balls of chickpea batter soaked in sugar syrup.

=== Thaggu ke laddu ===
Thaggu ke ("Cheat's") laddu is made from khoa (condensed milk), semolina, and white sugar and is a specialty of Kanpur, India. It was invented by Mattha Pandey, a follower of Mahatma Gandhi. Pandey heard Gandhi refer to white sugar, which was popularized in India by the British, as "white poison" and disease-causing. Since his laddu was made with white sugar, he named it accordingly.

=== Shahi laddu ===
Shahi (royal) laddu is made from the sweets peda and barfi, which are ground into a paste, mixed with cardamom, dried fruits, and nuts, and formed into balls. It is decorated with vark (edible foil).

=== Coconut laddu ===
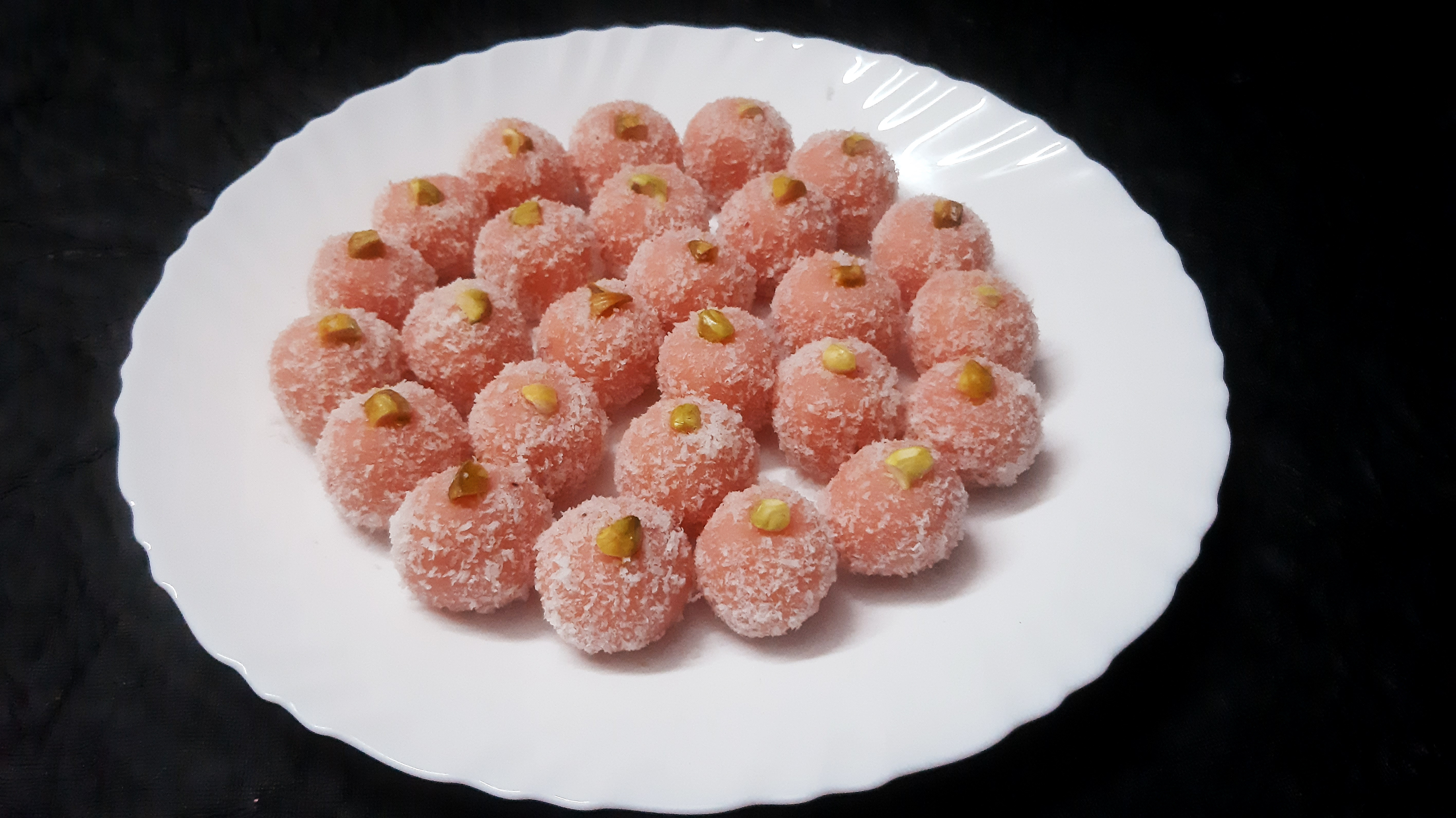
Coconut laddus

Coconut laddu originated in the medieval Chola Empire, when it was packed for travelers and warriors for good luck on their expeditions.

=== Gond ke laddu ===
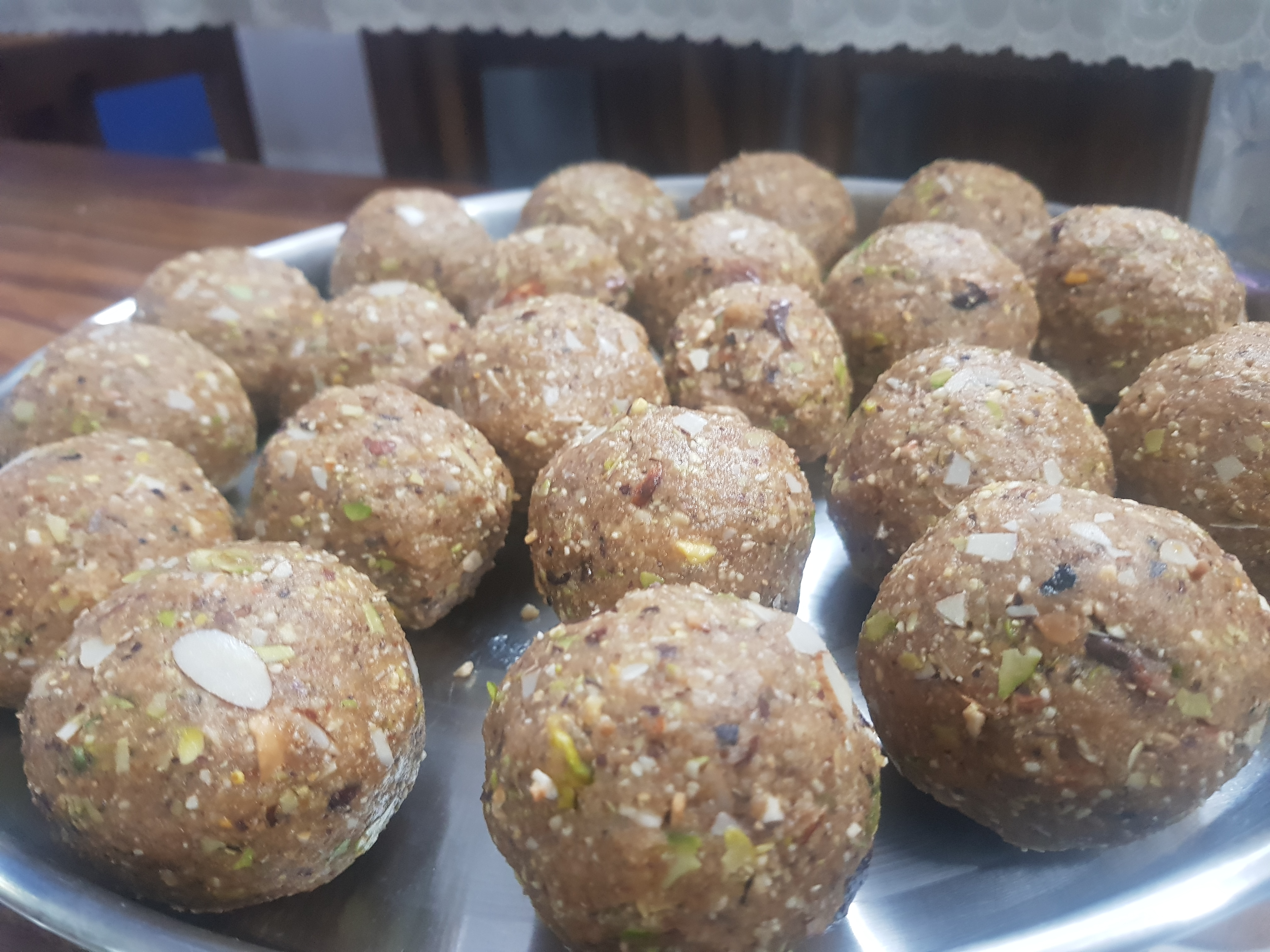
Gond ke laddus

Gond ke laddu is made from roasted and powdered gond (gum arabic), ghee, jaggery, and sometimes battisa or keoka powder. It is commonly served in North India as a postpartum food.

=== Temple laddus ===
Some Hindu temples have their own laddu versions, which are offered to the deities and then served to devotees as prasada (sanctified food). The besan laddu served in the Venkateswara Temple in Tirupati, India, has been called "the most famous temple laddu". The Maa Tarini Temple in Ghatgaon, India serves laddus made from coconut and khoa. The special laddu at the Subramaniya Swamy Temple in Tiruchendur, India is made from foxtail millet.

=== Others ===
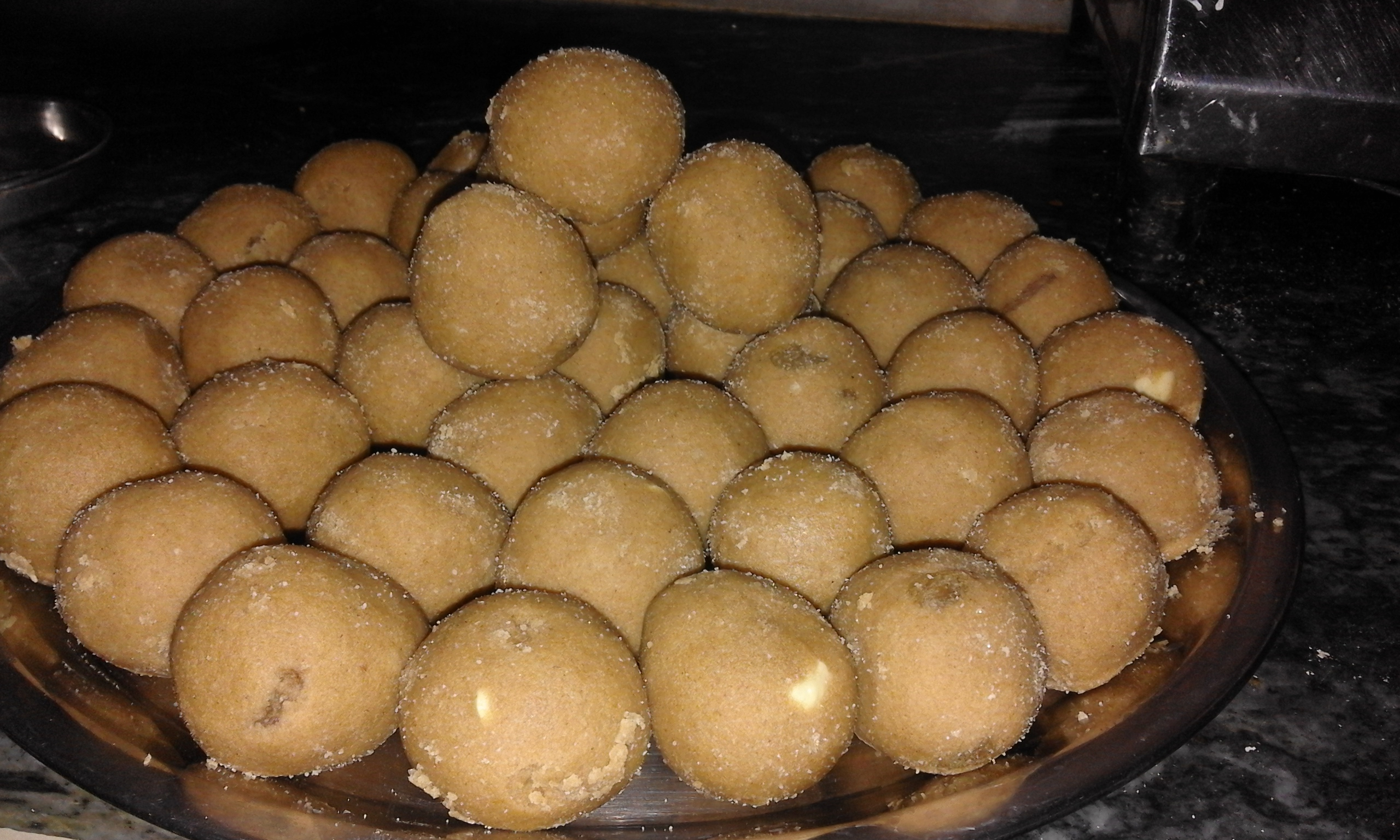
Wheat flour laddus

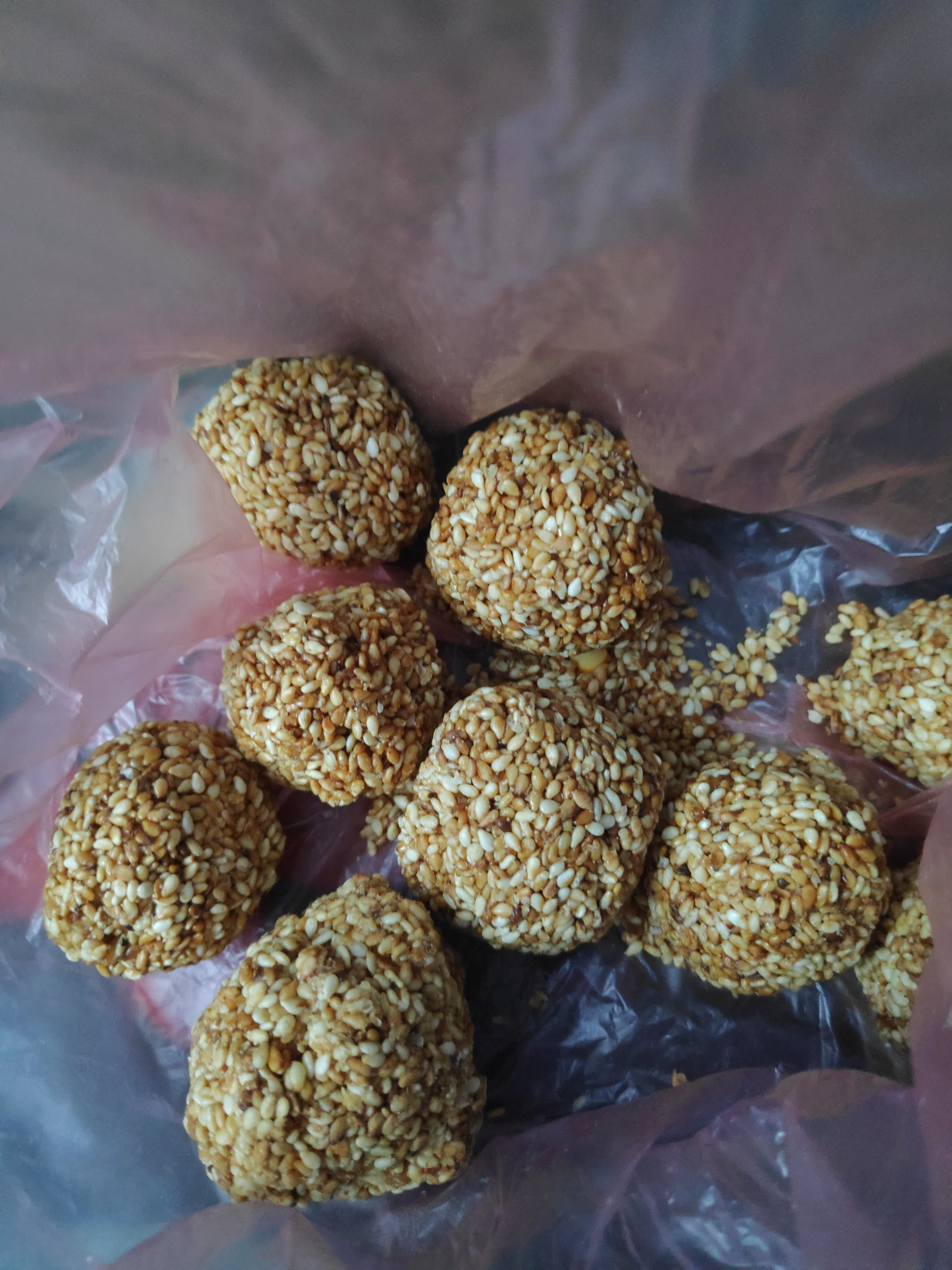
Til (sesame seed) laddus

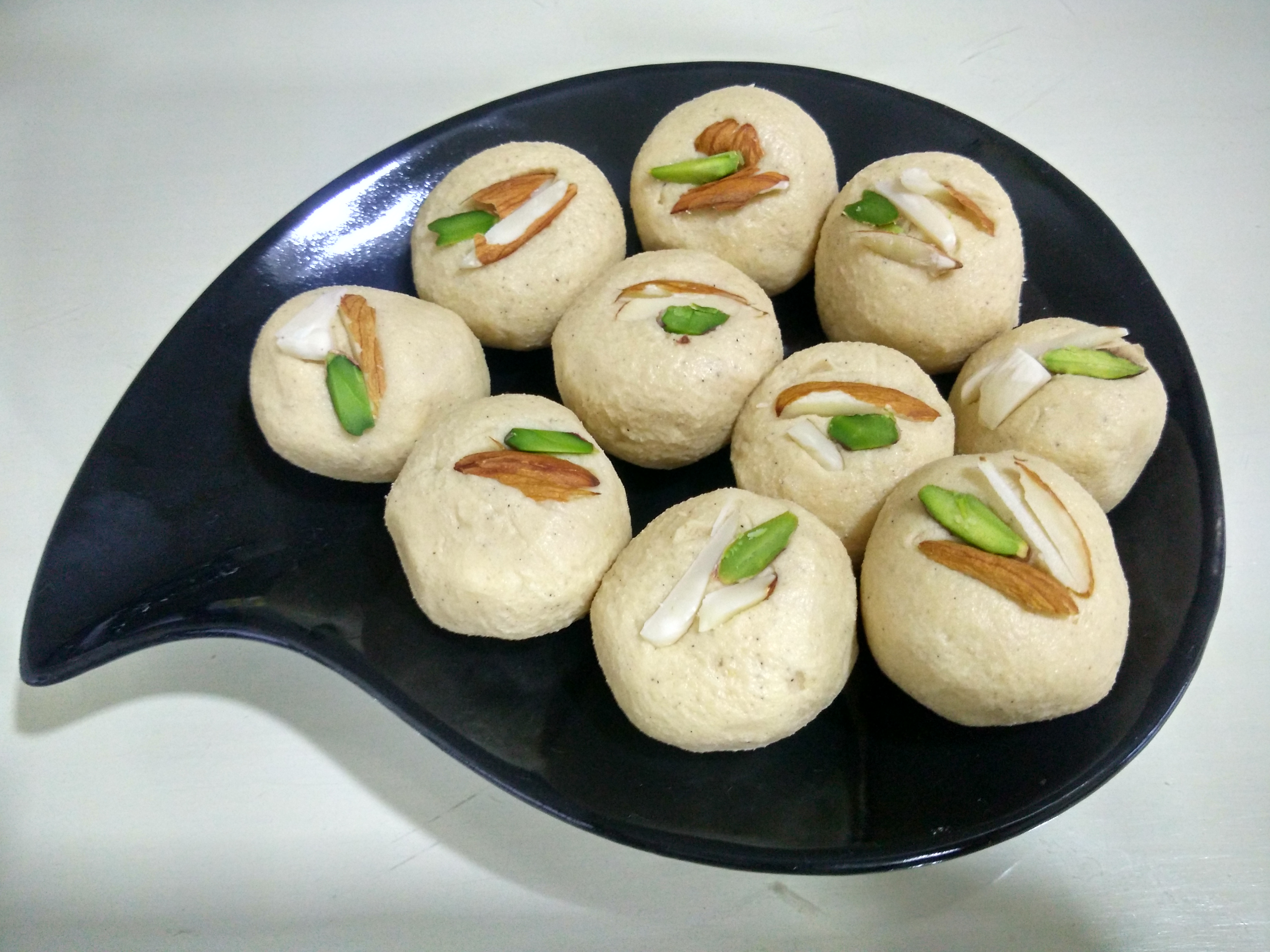
Rice flour laddus

Every region of India has its own version of laddu. In Rajasthan, laddus are made from wheat flour, in Maharashtra from sesame seeds, in Kerala from rice flour, and in Andhra Pradesh from rice flakes. Optional ingredients include grated coconut, roasted chickpeas, nuts, and raisins.

== World record ==
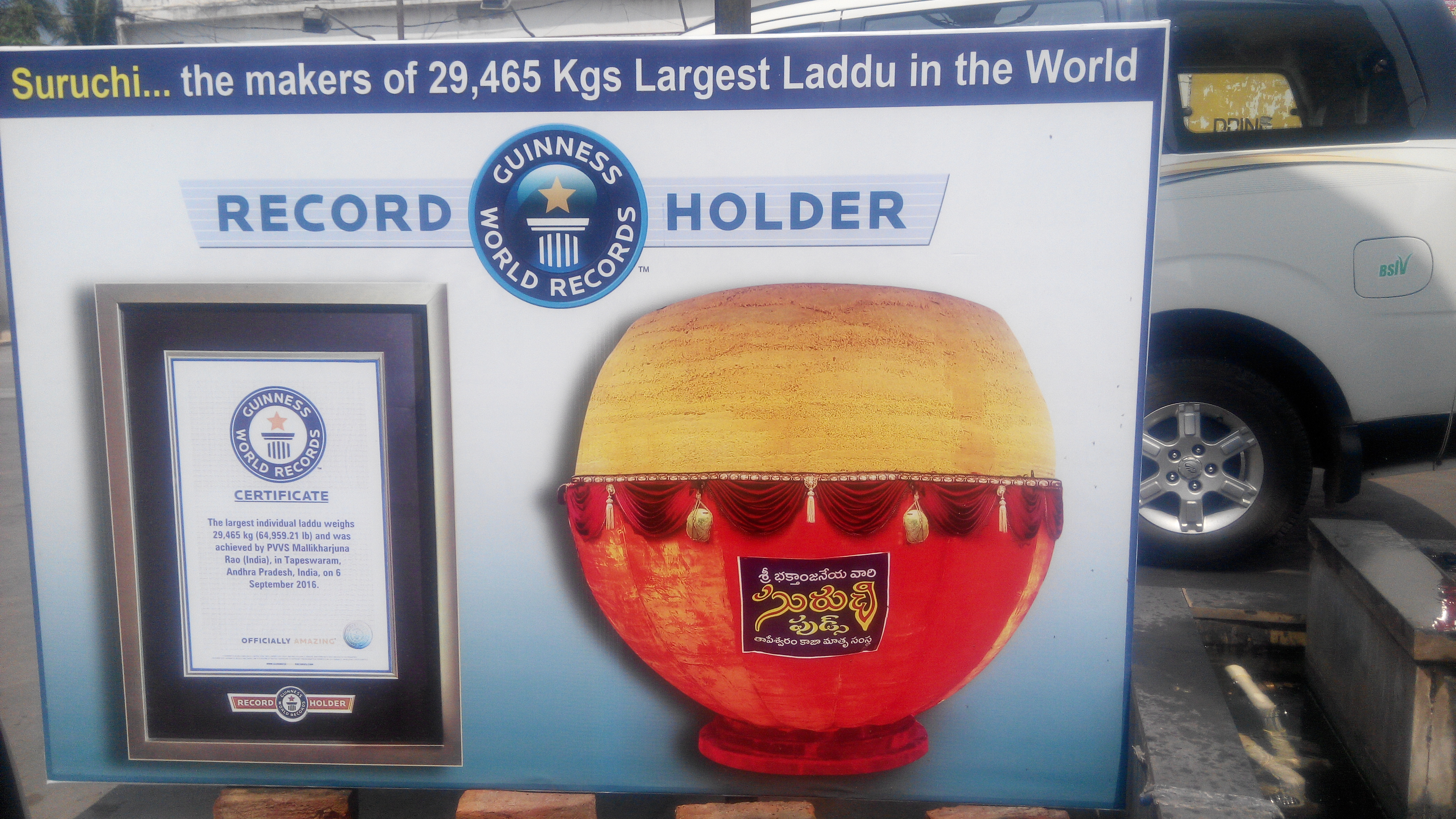
An advertisement depicting the world record holder

According to Guinness World Records, the world's largest laddu to date was created by PVVS Mallikharjuna Rao in Tapeswaram, Andhra Pradesh, India in 2016. It weighed 29,465 kilograms (64,959 pounds) and was made using a traditional boondi recipe with ghee, oil, cashews, sugar, almonds, cardamom, and water.

== In popular culture ==
In the Sesame Street episode "Rakhi Road", the character Elmo is shown eating laddus. Laddus have also been featured in cooking shows and food programmes showcasing traditional Indian sweets.

== See also ==
- Tirupati laddu
- Sweets from the Indian subcontinent
- List of Indian sweets and desserts
