= Bhagwan Birsa Biological Park =

Zoopark in Jharkhand, India

Coordinates: 23.458°N 85.457°E

- Interactive map of Bhagwan Birsa Biological Park
- Location: Ranchi, Jharkhand, India
- No. of species: Mammals: 27 species Birds: 39 species Snakes: 17 species
- Annual visitors: 8-10 lakhs
- Memberships: CZA
- Website: www.ranchionline.in/city-guide/bhagwan-birsa-biological-park-in-ranchi

Bhagwan Birsa Biological Park (also known as Ranchi Zoo) is located off Chakla village, Ormanjhi in Ranchi, Jharkhand, India.

Ranchi Zoo was established in 1994 at the bank of Getalsud Dam and on the main Ranchi-Hazaribag highway. The park has two divisions: the zoological section is dedicated in 83 hectare and the botanical section is spread over 21 hectare.

== Facilities ==
The Zoo includes a separate ward dedicated to the complete treatment of animals and an emergency ward for rescued animals or newly arrived ones. Both are served by a dedicated veterinary doctor available 24/7. A well-established pathology lab for animals, including a trained compounder, is also present in the park.

For visitors, there is an Information Center offering battery-operated vehicles along with guide maps, a canteen, toilets and lavatories. Wheel chairs are available for physically-challenged persons. The Zoo's other amenities include drinking water, rest areas with sheds at regular intervals, first aid boxes, direction maps and sign boards for navigation.

== Programs ==
The Zoo also boasts an adoption program. Chosen animals receive funding that provides them with better facilities. For instance, actress and film producer Priyanka Chopra adopted tigress Durga and lioness Sundari. Other celebrities and various organizations, including Indian steel company MECON and PNB, the Punjab National Bank, also adopted animals in Ranchi Zoo.
