= National Highway 220 (India) =

National highway in India

National Highway 220
- Map of the National Highway in red

Route information
- Auxiliary route of NH 20
- Length: 180 km (110 mi)

Major junctions
- North end: Chaibasa
- South end: Dhenkikot

Location
- Country: India
- States: Jharkhand, Odisha

Highway system
- Roads in India; Expressways; National; State; Asian
← NH 20	→ NH 20

National Highway 220, commonly referred to as NH 220 is a national highway in India. It is a spur road of National Highway 20. NH-220 traverses the states of Jharkhand and Odisha in India. Prior to the new numbering system of national highways, adopted in 2018, the current NH 183 in Kerala was referred to as NH 220.

== Route ==
Jharkhand

Chaibasa - Gobindpur - Hata - Odisha border .

Odisha

Jharkhand border - Tiringidihi - Rairangpur - Jashipur - Dhenkikot.

== Junctions ==
NH 20 Terminal near Chaibasa.
NH 49 near Jashipur.
NH 20 Terminal near Dhenkikot.

== See also ==
- List of national highways in India
- List of national highways in India by state
