= National Highway 20 (India) =

National highway in India

National Highway 20
- National Highway 20 in Red on India map

Route information
- Part of AH42
- Length: 729 km (453 mi)

Major junctions
- North end: NH 31 / AH42 in Bakhtiyarpur
- List: NH 431 in Harnaut, Bihar; NH 33 / NH 120 in Bihar Sharif, Bihar; NH 19 in Barhi, Jharkhand; NH 522 in Hazaribagh, Jharkhand; NH 43 / NH 320 in Raipur, Jharkhand; NH 143AG / NH 143D in Khunti, Jharkhand; NH 320D in Chakradharpur, Jharkhand; NH 43 / NH 220 in Chaibasa, Jharkhand; NH 320G in Hat Gamharia, Jharkhand; NH 520 in Rimuli, Odisha; NH 49 / NH 720 in Kendujhargarh, Odisha; NH 220 in Dhenkikote, Odisha
- South end: NH 16 in Panikoili

Location
- Country: India
- States: Bihar, Jharkhand, Odisha

Highway system
- Roads in India; Expressways; National; State; Asian
← NH 19	→ NH 21

National Highway 20 (NH 20) is a National Highway in India. This highway originates from Bakhtiyarpur in Bihar and terminates at Panikoili in Odisha.

== Route ==
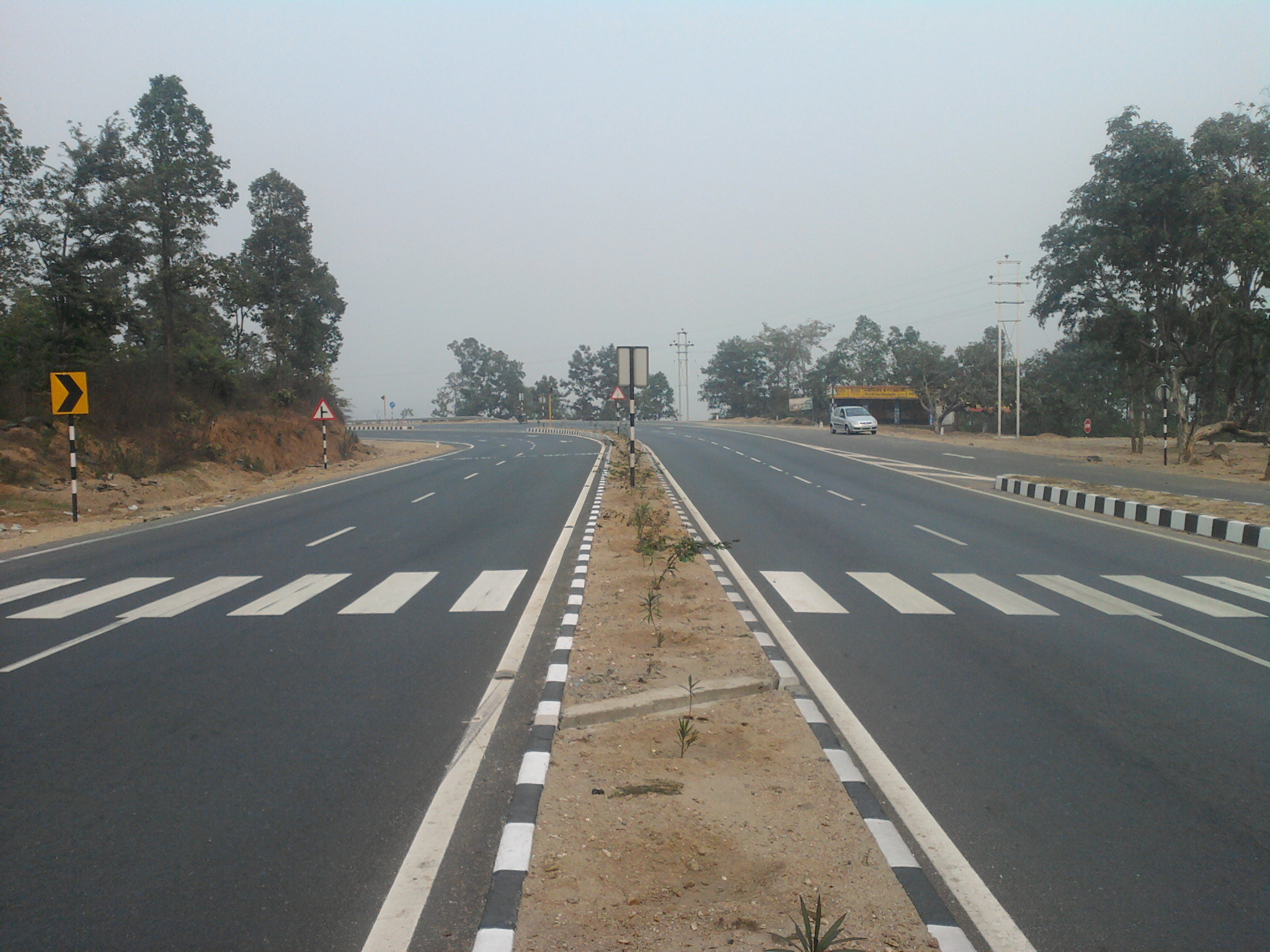
National Highway 20 near Ramgarh

Bihar:- Bakhtiyarpur - Bihar Sharif - Nawada - Rajauli

Jharkhand:- Kodarma - Barhi - Padma - Hazaribag - Charhi - Kuju - Ramgarh - Ormanjhi - Irba - Mesra - Ranchi - Bundu - Chandil - Saraikela - Chaibasa - Jagannathpur - Jaintgarh.

Odisha:- Champua - Parsora - Rimuli - Kendujhargarh - Dhenkikote and terminating at Panikoili.

== Ongoing Works ==
Shortening of the highway is in progress to connect Khunti with Chaibasa via Chakradharpur & to connect Chaibasa with Jaintgarh via Hat Gamharia. The highway is 4 laned in Bakhtiyarpur - Bihar Sharif - Nawada, Kodarma - Barhi - Padma - Hazaribag - Charhi - Kuju - Ramgarh - Ormanjhi - Irba - Mesra - Ranchi, Chandil - Kandra & Rimuli - Kendujhargarh - Panikoili stretches. 4 lane works is to be done on the Nawada - Rajauli, Ranchi - Khunti - Tamar, Chaibasa - Hat Gamharia - Jaintgarh & Champua - Parsora - Rimuli stretches which will reduce the distance to 676 kilometres (420 mi) from current 729 kilometres (453 mi).
