= National Highway 720 (India) =

National Highway in India

National Highway 720
- Map of National Highway 720 in red
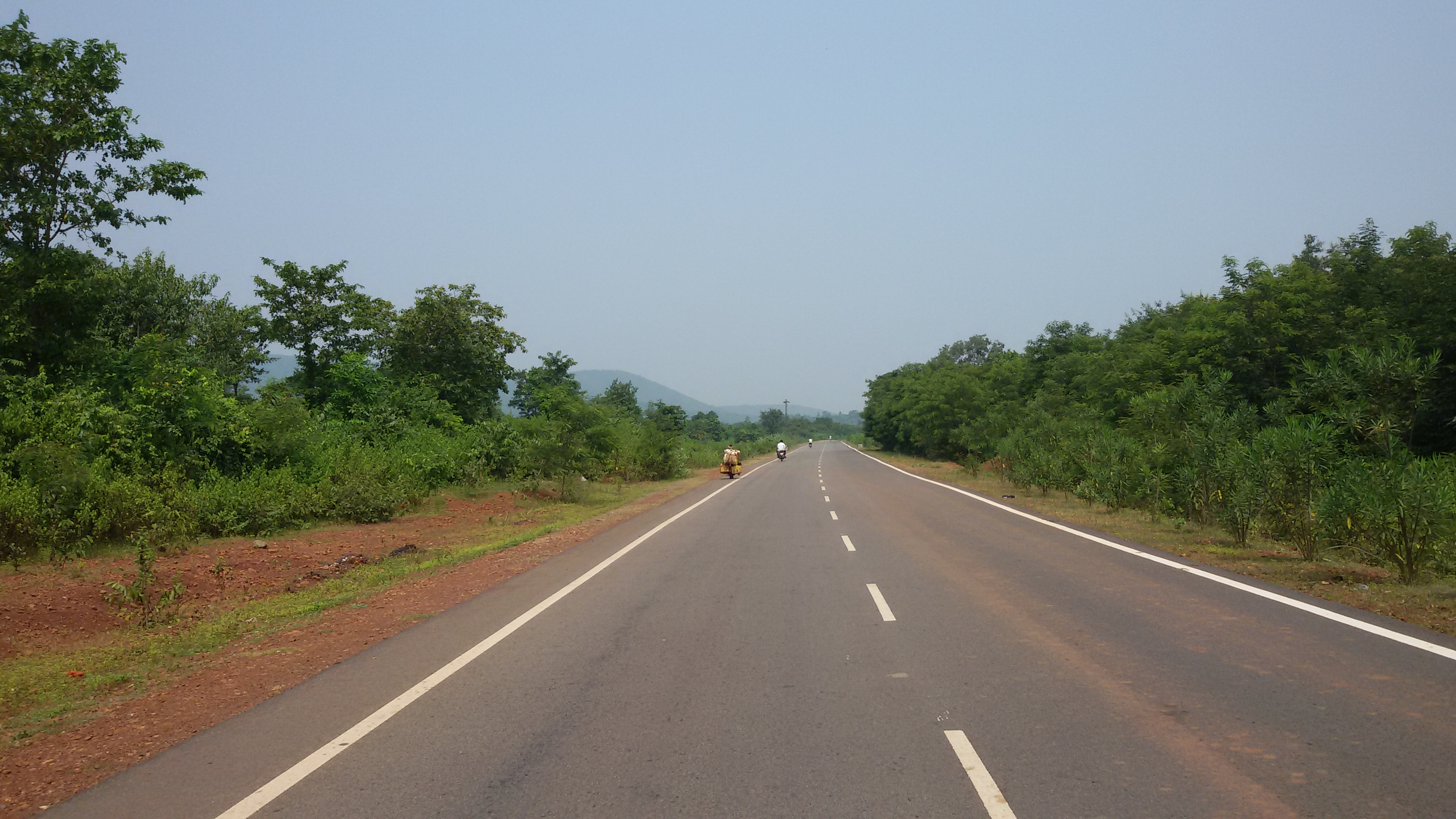
- Passing through Tomka Forest Block

Route information
- Auxiliary route of NH 20
- Length: 89 km (55 mi)

Major junctions
- North end: Keonjhar
- South end: Duburi Chak

Location
- Country: India
- States: Odisha

Highway system
- Roads in India; Expressways; National; State; Asian
← NH 20	→ NH 53

National Highway 720, commonly referred to as NH 720, is a national highway in India. It is a secondary route of National Highway 20. NH-720 runs in the state of Odisha in India.

== Route ==
NH720 connects Keonjhar, Basantpur, Deobandha, Bhagamunda, Brahmanipal, Dhanurjoypur and Duburi Chak in the state of Odisha.

== Junctions ==
NH 20 Terminal near Keonjhar.
NH 53 Terminal near Duburi Chak.

== See also ==
- List of national highways in India
- List of national highways in India by state
