= Mesra, Ranchi =

Mesra
- Town
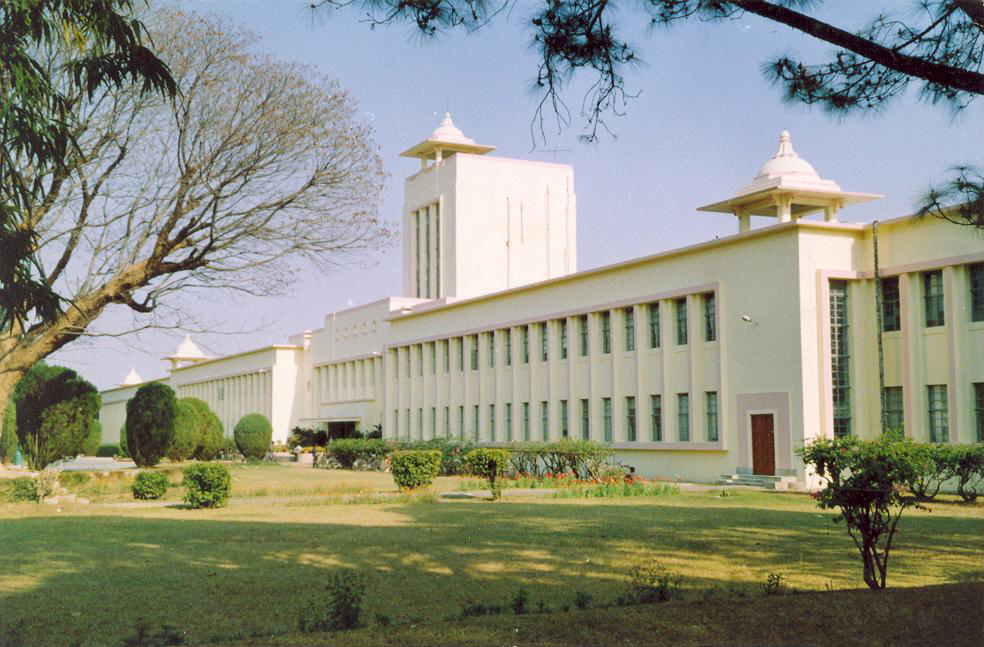
- Birla Institute of Technology

- Location in Jharkhand, India3 Mesra (India)
- Coordinates: 23.4294°N 85.4124°E
- Country: India
- State: Jharkhand
- District: Ranchi

Government
  - Type: Federal democracy

Population (2011)
  - Total: 9,476

Languages (*For language details see Kanke block#Language and religion)
  - Official: Hindi, Urdu
- Time zone: UTC+5:30 (IST)
- PIN: 835215
- Telephone/ STD code: 0651
- Vehicle registration: JH 01
- Literacy: 80.40%
- Lok Sabha constituency: Ranchi
- Vidhan Sabha constituency: Kanke
- Website: ranchi.nic.in

Mesra is a town in the Kanke CD block in the Ranchi Sadar subdivision of the Ranchi district in the Indian state of Jharkhand.

== Geography ==
Cities, towns and locations in Ranchi district in South Chotanagpur Division
M: municipality, CT: census town, R: rural/ urban centre, N: neighbourhood, T: tourist centre, D: dam, H: historical/ religious centre
Owing to space constraints in the small map, the actual locations in a larger map may vary slightly

=== Location ===
Mesra is located at 23.4294°N 85.4124°E.

=== Area overview ===
The map alongside shows a part of the Ranchi plateau, most of it at an average elevation of 2,140 feet above sea level. Only a small part in the north-eastern part of the district is the lower Ranchi plateau, spread over Silli, Rahe, Sonahatu and Tamar CD blocks, at an elevation of 500 to 1,000 feet above sea level. There is a 16 km long ridge south-west of Ranchi. There are isolated hills in the central plateau. The principal river of the district, the Subarnarekha, originates near Ratu, flows in an easterly direction and descends from the plateau, with a drop of about 300 feet at Hundru Falls. Subarnarekha and other important rivers are marked on the map. The forested area is shaded in the map. A major part of the North Karanpura Area and some fringe areas of the Piparwar Area of the Central Coalfields Limited, both located in the North Karanpura Coalfield, are in Ranchi district. There has been extensive industrial activity in Ranchi district, since independence. Ranchi district is the first in the state in terms of population. 8.83% of the total population of the state lives in this district - 56.9% is rural population and 43.1% is urban population.

Note: The map alongside presents some of the notable locations in the district. All places marked in the map are linked in the larger full screen map.

== Demographics ==
According to the 2011 Census of India, Mesra had a total population of 9,476, of which 5,433 (58%) were males and 4,023 (42%) were females. Population in the age range 0–6 years was 1,115. The total number of literate persons in Mesra was 6,722 (80.40% of the population over 6 years).

== Education ==
Birla Institute of Technology, established in 1955 by the industrialist B.M.Birla, is a deemed university, it offers degree, post graduate and Ph D programmes. Central facilities include CAD, library and instrumentation. The campus is completely residential with 11 hostels for boys and 3 for girls. It has a guest house, 2 bank branches, 3 ATMs, a post office and an Indian Railway counter in the campus.

Jawahar Navodaya Vidyalaya is an English-medium coeducational institution established at Mesra in 1988. It is a senior secondary school following the Central Board of Secondary Education pattern.

DAV International School is an English-medium coeducational institution established at Mesra in 2005. It follows the Central Board of Secondary Education pattern.

Manrakhan Mahto B Ed College was established in 2012 at Kedal, BIT Mor, PO Neori Vikas. It offers diploma, degree and post-graduate courses in education.

== Transport ==
There is a station at Mesra on the Koderma–Hazaribagh–Barkakana–Ranchi line. The Barkakana-Koderma sector is in operation and, as of 2021, the Ranchi-Barkakana sector is partially operable and is nearing completion.

National Highway 20 (earlier NH 33) (Ranchi-Ramgarh-Hazaribagh Road), an important roadway in Ranchi district, passes through Mesra.
