= Yuwa-India =

Football program for girls in rural India

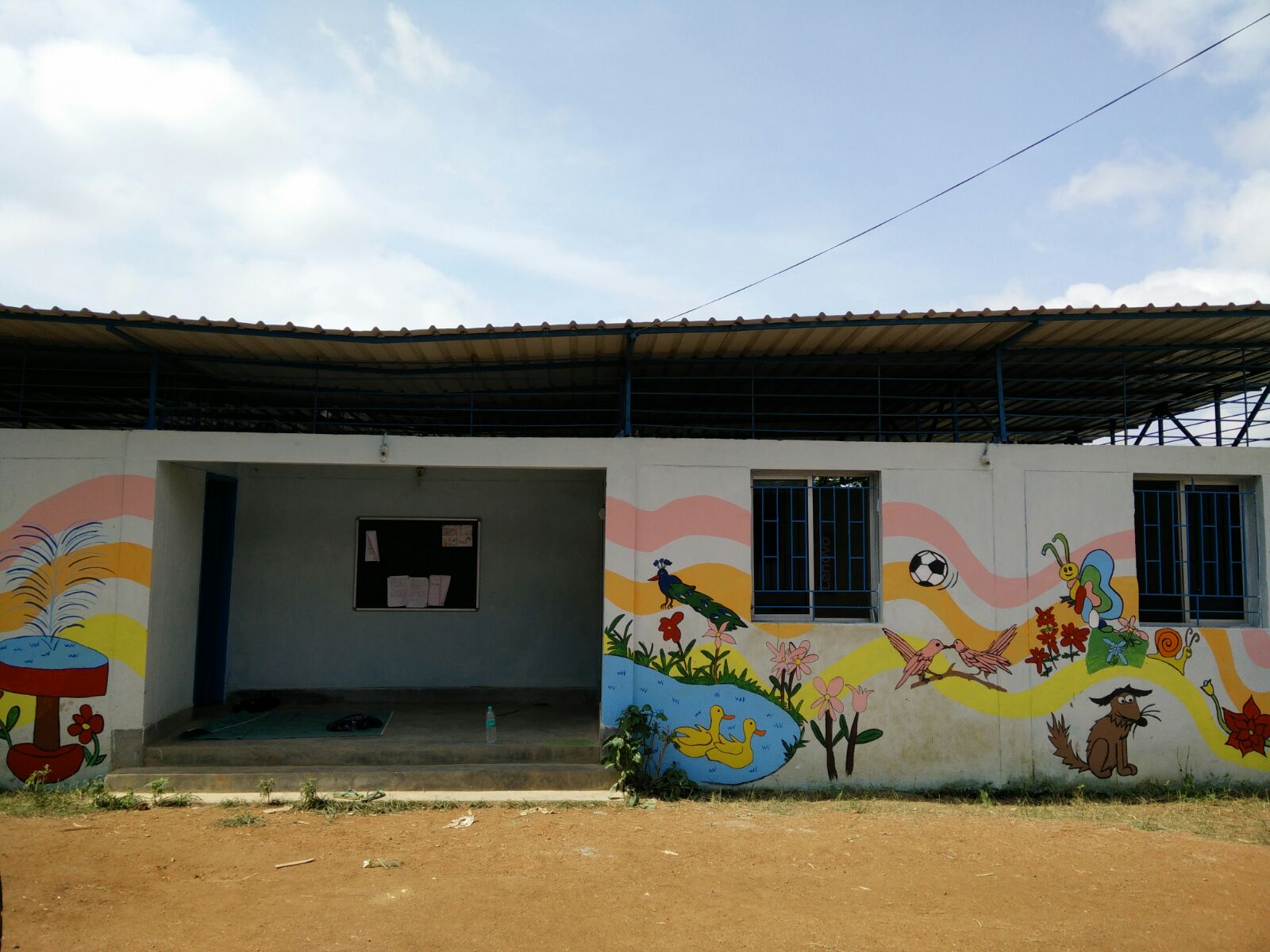
Hutup Yuwa School

Yuwa-India is an organization based in Jharkhand, India that consists of a girls' football club and school. It uses girls' team sports and schooling opportunities as a platform for social development in rural India. The football club part of Yuwa is the first club specifically designed for female players (catered to girls 6-18 years of age), and has 250 players, 150 of whom practice daily. In 2009, Franz Gastler founded Yuwa with the financial help of his high school friends, Greg Deming, Stephen Peterson, and Erik Odland, to use football as a platform to combat child marriage, illiteracy and human trafficking among girls in rural India.

== Details ==
=== History ===
Franz Gastler has given TEDx talks on "Sports to promote confidence in women" (2012), "The Girl Effect" (2013) and with Rinky Kumari "Yuwa - How football can change lives" (2015).

The program was featured as a Microsoft Edge Partner, November 16, 2017, highlighting the new Yuwa web page. The News & Media page has a list of media articles describing Yuwa.

=== Donosti Cup football tournament ===
Participation in the 2013 tournament helped Yuwa achieve recognition in India. Their participation in the 2016 tournament in Spain was featured in a short series of four videos by the Bollywood star Ranbir Kapoor. They were the second team invited to the 2018 25th Anniversary tournament.

== Awards ==
- Laureus Sport for Good Award (2019)
