= National Highway 320D (India) =

National Highway in India

National Highway 320D
- Map of National Highway 320D in red

Route information
- Auxiliary route of NH 20
- Length: 133.8 km (83.1 mi)

Major junctions
- East end: Chakradharpur
- West end: Rourkela

Location
- Country: India
- States: Jharkhand, Odisha

Highway system
- Roads in India; Expressways; National; State; Asian
| ← NH 20 | → NH 143 |

National Highway 320D, commonly referred to as NH 320D is a national highway in India. It is a secondary route of National Highway 20. NH-320D runs in the states of Jharkhand and Odisha in India.

== Route ==
NH320D connects Chakradharpur, Sonua, Goelkera, Manoharpur, Jaraikela and Rourkela in the states of Jharkhand and Odisha.

== Junctions ==
NH 20 Terminal near Chakradharpur.
NH 320G near Manoharpur
NH 143 Terminal near Rourkela.

== Future plan ==
The Ministry of Road Transport and Highways has approved redevelopment of NH 320D & sanctioned Rupees 209.50 Crore for the project. The Project is aimed to connect Tatanagar with Rourkela via Chakradharpur, Sonua, Goilkera, Kaeda, Barposh, Manoharpur, Bisra & Bondamunda. For this purpose, A road will be made from Bholadih to Chakradharpur connecting NH 43 with NH 20 via Sini, Rajkharsawan & Barabambo. But problems regarding Land acquisition is hampering the project.

== See also ==
- List of national highways in India
- List of national highways in India by state
