= National Highway 143D (India) =

National Highway in India

National Highway 143D
- Map of National Highway 143D in red

Route information
- Auxiliary route of NH 43
- Length: 81.7 km (50.8 mi)

Major junctions
- West end: Jamtoli
- East end: Khunti

Location
- Country: India
- States: Jharkhand

Highway system
- Roads in India; Expressways; National; State; Asian
← NH 143	→ NH 20

National Highway 143D, commonly referred to as the NH 143D is a national highway in India. It is a secondary route of National Highway 43. NH-143D runs in the state of Jharkhand in India.

== Route ==
NH143D connects Jamtoli, Basia, Kamadara, Torpa and Khunti in the state of Jharkhand.

== Junctions ==
NH 143 Terminal near Jamtoli.
NH 20 Terminal near Khunti.

== See also ==
- List of national highways in India
- List of national highways in India by state
