= Hutup =

Village in Jharkhand, India

Coordinates: 23.442°N 85.449°E

Hutup is a small village in Ormanjhi tehsil, Ranchi district, Jharkhand, India. It is one of 91 villages in Ormanjhi Block along with villages like Koilari and Karma. The village is mostly known for its zamindar or king 'Thakur Tilak Dhari Singh. zamindar of seven nearby villages. He was praised by the villagers. He played a great role. And donated most of the land to poor farmers. He donated many lands for temples, mosques, schools and hospital. He ruled the village with honour and pride. At present his grandsons (Thakur Dhruvpratap singh, Thakur Govind Singh, Thakur Aditya Singh and Thakur Sarju Singh) are also contributing and raising the name of Tilakdhari Singh. Its nearest railway station is in Ranchi, accessible via National Highway 33.

== Education ==
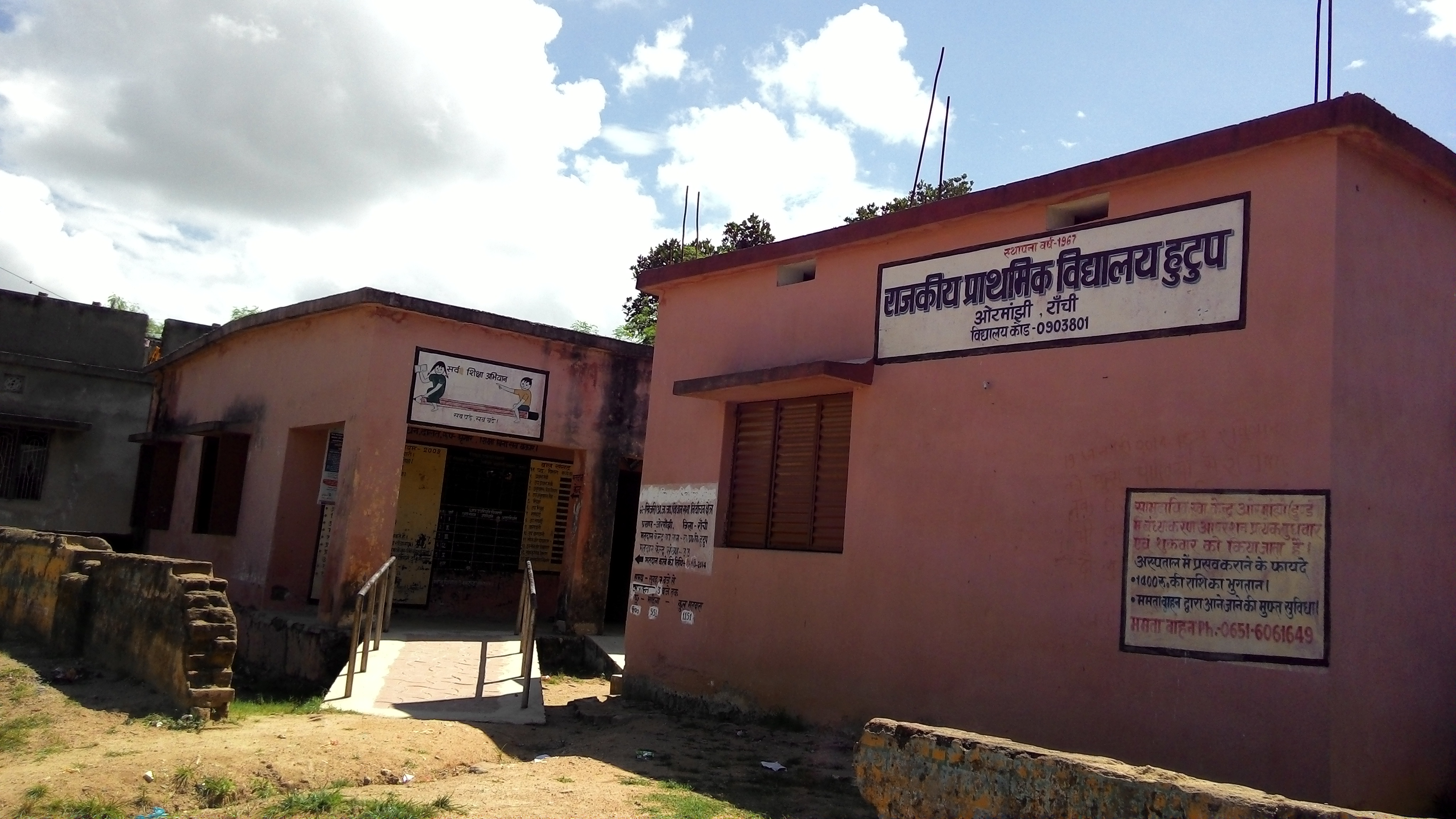
Hutup School

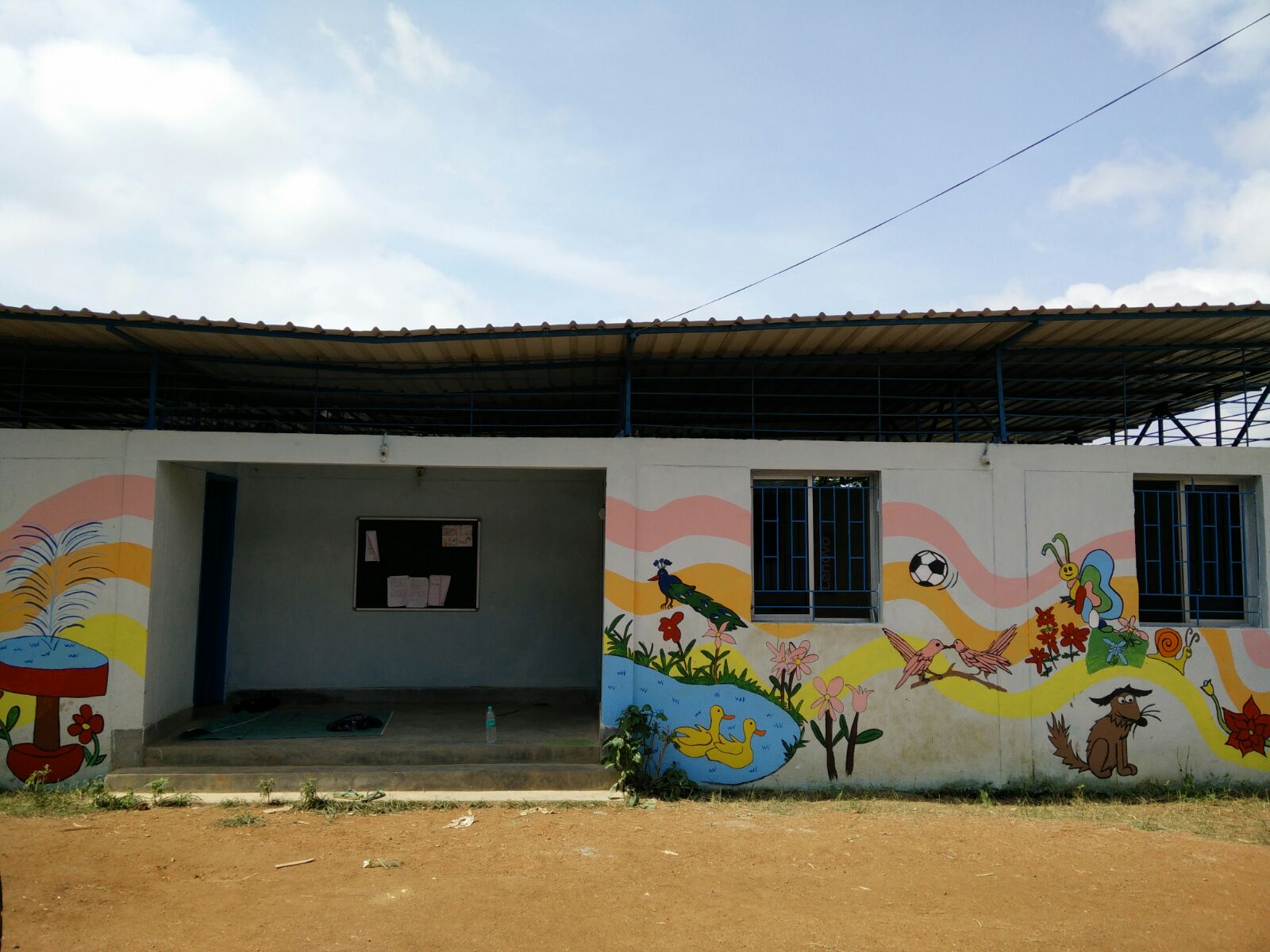
Hutup Yuwa School

In Hutup there are private and public schools. In private schools the family needs to pay the fees. Poor families can send their children to government schools without paying any fees.

- Aangan Wadi – 1- to 5-year-olds go to Aangan Wadi. They get rice, soybean and dal and are given a basic education.
- A.G. Church School
- Yuwa School – By Yuwa-India

Amrita College of Nursing is a private college at Hutup, PO Irba.

== Hospitals ==
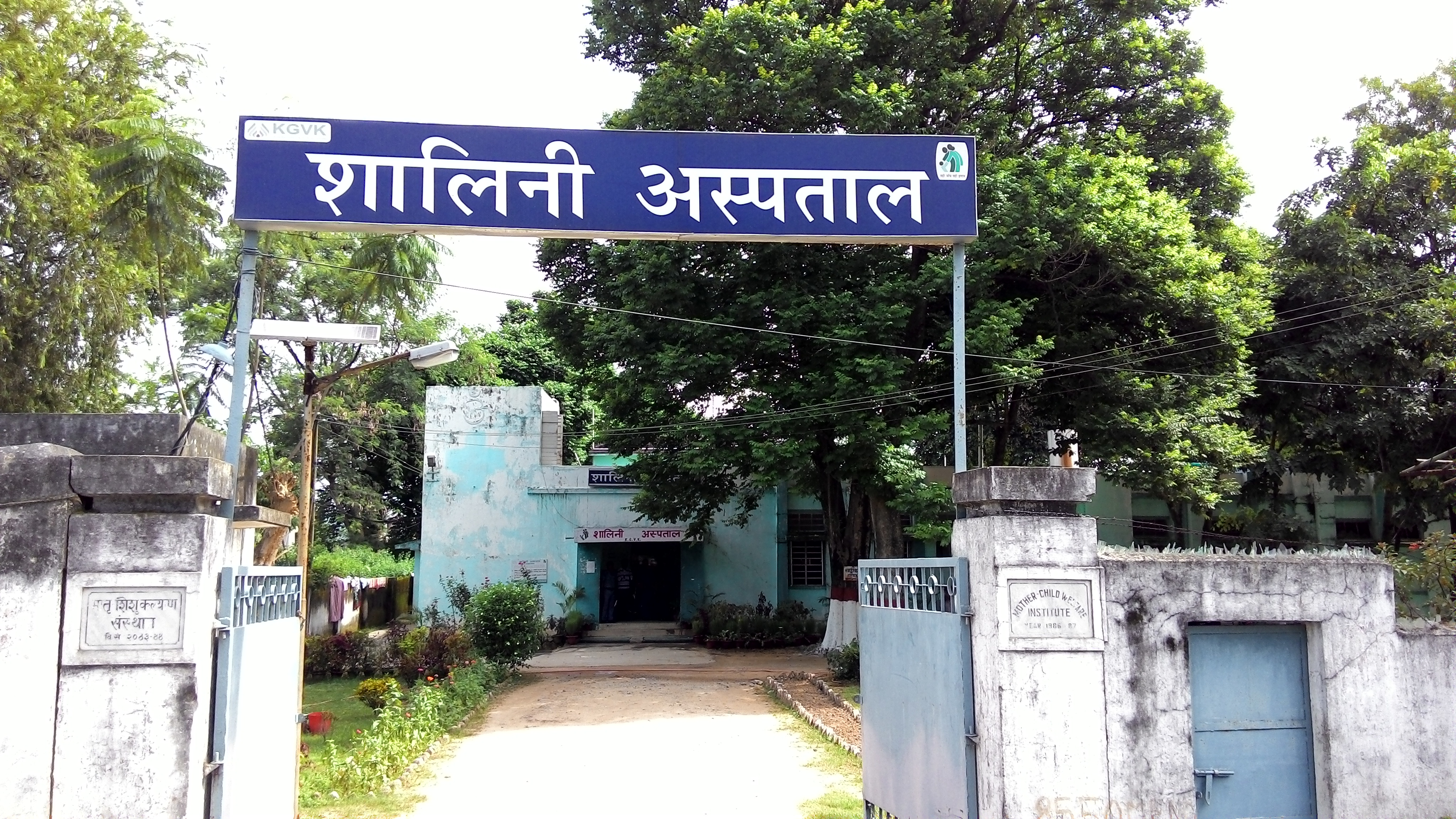
Shalini Hospital Hutup, Ranchi

- Medanta Hospital – Previously called Apollo Hospital, this is a private hospital and the most known hospital in Hutup. It is located on NH33 Road. Many patients come there for treatment, especially soldiers after receiving gunshot wounds. Yuwa girls have insurance cards so that they can get treatment at half price.
- Shalini Hospital – This hospital is used for emergencies by villagers, including pregnant women. It is located on Rukka Road. This hospital offers free treatment to those with health cards.

== Religion ==
Devi Temple is one of the oldest temples. It was built by the villagers. The Christian villagers worship at Jesu Bhavan, which is next to Yuwa School. There is a mosque near Karma village.

== Sports ==
Football is the most popular sport in Hutup. In Hutup there is a large girls' football field which is known as Yuwa-India. Yuwa is only for girls who live in the village.
