= National Highway 320G (India) =

National Highway in India

National Highway 320G
- Map of National Highway 320G in red

Route information
- Auxiliary route of NH 20
- Length: 180 km (110 mi)

Major junctions
- East end: Hat Gamaria
- West end: Kolebira

Location
- Country: India
- States: Jharkhand

Highway system
- Roads in India; Expressways; National; State; Asian
← NH 20	→ NH 143

National Highway 320G, commonly referred to as NH 320G is a national highway in India. It is a secondary route of National Highway 20. NH-320G runs in the state of Jharkhand in India.

== Route ==
NH320G connects Hat Gamaria, Jagannathpur, Baraiburu, Saddle, Manoharpur, Anandpur, Bano and Kolebira in the state of Jharkhand.

== Junctions ==
NH 20 Terminal near Hat Gamaria.
NH 320D near Manoharpur
NH 143 Terminal near Kolebira.

== See also ==
- List of national highways in India
- List of national highways in India by state
