= Franz Gastler =

American social activist, teacher and football coach

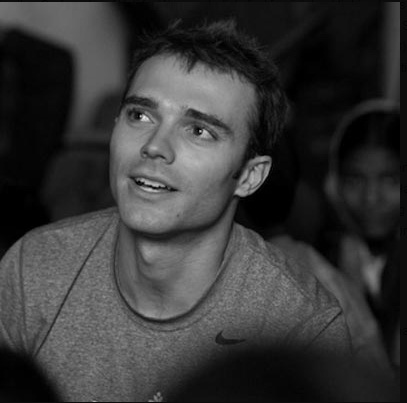
- Gastler in 2012
- Born: 1982 (age 43–44); Edina, Minnesota, U.S.
- Education: Boston University, Harvard Law School
- Occupations: social activist, teacher, football coach
- Known for: Yuwa-India

Franz Gastler (born in 1982) is an American social activist, teacher and football coach. He works primarily in India and is the co-founder and executive director of non-government organisation (NGO) Yuwa-India.

== Early life and education ==
Gastler was born in 1982 in Edina, Minnesota. He studied at Edina High School and graduated in 2000. He attended University Professors Program of Boston University, and received his Bachelor of Arts and Master of Arts in international political economy. He is certified in negotiation and mediation from the "university consortium" Program on Negotiation at the Harvard Law School. He underwent internship at the Ministry of Finance and Public Credit in Bogotá, Colombia.

He participated in various sports. He received training in judo at the United States Olympic Training Center. He is experienced in coaching alpine skiing for 12 years, and played ice hockey as a goaltender.

== Social activism ==
In 2008, he joined Krishi Gram Vikas Kendra (English: Agriculture Rural Development Center), a Jharkhand based NGO, as an English teacher. During his time as a teacher, he lived in a "farmer's mud hut". He was asked by one of his students to teach her to play football. He founded Yuwa-India with the financial help of his high school friends, Greg Deming, Sephen Peterson, and Erik Odland, to use football as a platform to combat child marriage, illiteracy and human trafficking among girls in rural India. Yuwa ('youth' in Hindi) is an NGO "that teaches girls to play [football], and promotes health and education."

Gastler, who never played or watched a football match before, started teaching the sport to girls between five and seventeen years of age. Parents were initially reluctant to allow their daughters to take part in an "uncommon" activity, but now there are more than 250 girls who practice daily. The program has been quite successful and has received endorsements from the United Nations Development Fund for Women, Nike, Coca-Cola India, and many others.

== Awards and recognition ==
Gastler's contributions and achievements of Yuwa have been recognized at several award ceremonies, including 2012 NDTV Spirit of Sports Award in the Best Promotion of Sports in Education category, Times Now Indian at Heart award for Gastler at the 2013 Times Now Amazing Indians Award ceremony, Nike Gamechangers Award in 2011 and Yahoo! India's 12 Unsung Heroes of 2012 award.
