= Ormanjhi =

- Village
- Location in Jharkhand, India Ormanjhi (India)
- Coordinates: 23°29′0″N 85°29′0″E
- Country: India
- State: Jharkhand
- District: Ranchi
- Block: Ormanjhi

Government
  - Type: Federal democracy
- Elevation: 607 m (1,991 ft)

Population (2011)
  - Total: 3,956

Languages (*For language details see Ormanjhi block#Language and religion)
  - Official: Hindi, Urdu
- Time zone: UTC+5:30 (IST)
- PIN: 835219
- Telephone/STD code: 06530
- Vehicle registration: JH 1
- Literacy: 82.15%
- Lok Sabha constituency: Ranchi
- Vidhan Sabha constituency: Ranchi
- Website: ranchi.nic.in

Ormanjhi is a village in the Ormanjhi CD block in the Ranchi Sadar subdivision of Ranchi district, Jharkhand, India.

== Geography ==
Cities, towns and locations in Ranchi district in South Chotanagpur Division
M: municipality, CT: census town, R: rural/ urban centre, N: neighbourhood, T: tourist centre, D: dam, H: historical/ religious centre
Owing to space constraints in the small map, the actual locations in a larger map may vary slightly

=== Location ===
Ormanjhi is located at 23°29′0″N 85°29′0″E at an elevation of 607 m (1,991 ft) from mean sea level (MSL).

=== Area overview ===
The map alongside shows a part of the Ranchi plateau, most of it at an average elevation of 2,140 feet above sea level. Only a small part in the north-eastern part of the district is the lower Ranchi plateau, spread over Silli, Rahe, Sonahatu and Tamar CD blocks, at an elevation of 500 to 1,000 feet above sea level. There is a 16 km long ridge south-west of Ranchi. There are isolated hills in the central plateau. The principal river of the district, the Subarnarekha, originates near Ratu, flows in an easterly direction and descends from the plateau, with a drop of about 300 feet at Hundru Falls. Subarnarekha and other important rivers are marked on the map. The forested area is shaded in the map. A major part of the North Karanpura Area and some fringe areas of the Piparwar Area of the Central Coalfields Limited, both located in the North Karanpura Coalfield, are in Ranchi district. There has been extensive industrial activity in Ranchi district, since independence. Ranchi district is the first in the state in terms of population. 8.83% of the total population of the state lives in this district - 56.9% is rural population and 43.1% is urban population.

Note: The map alongside presents some of the notable locations in the district. All places marked in the map are linked in the larger full screen map.

=== Places of interest ===
Ormanjhi is known for picnic and sightseeing spots. Birsa munda jaivik udyaan along with the aquarium is the main attractive spot. Some of the sightseeing spots are:

- Jaivik Udyan Zoological Park
- Gonda Hill
- Hutup
- Getalsud Dam
- Blue Pond
- Mahakaal mandir (Gagari hill)

== Demographics ==
According to the 2011 Census of India, Ormanjhi had a total population of 3,956, of which 2,030 (51%) were males and 1,926 (49%) were females. Population in the age range 0–6 years was 471. The total number of literate persons in Ormanjhi was 2,863 (82.15% of the population over 6 years).

== Civic administration ==
=== Police station ===
There is a police station at Ormanjhi.

=== CD block HQ ===
The headquarters of Ormanjhi CD block are located at Ormanjhi village.

== Economy ==
Sikidiri Hydroelectricity power plant is at 17 km from Ormanjhi.

== Transport ==
National Highway 20 (earlier NH 33) (Ranchi-Ramgarh-Hazaribagh Road), an important roadway in Ranchi district, passes through Ormanjhi.

The nearest airport is Ranchi Airport and the nearest railway station is at Ranchi.

== Education ==
Ram Tahal Choudary Inter College is a Hindi-medium coeducational institution established at Dardag, Ormanjhi in 2007. It has facilities for teaching in classes XI and XII. It has a playground and a library with 3,055 books.

S.S. High School is a Hindi-medium boys only institution established in 1954. It has facilities for teaching from class IX to class XII. It has a playground, a library with 2,307 books, and has 1 computer for teaching and learning purposes.

TUSSV Project High School is a Hindi-medium girls institution established in 1982. It has facilities for teaching in classes IX and X. The school has a playground.

Saraswati Sishu Vidyamandir is a Hindi-medium coeducational institution established at Ormanjhi in 1991. It has facilities for teaching from class I to class X. It has a library with 2,000 books and has 7 computers for teaching and learning purposes.

Ram Tahal Choudhary Institute of Technology was established in 2008 at Anandi, Ormanjhi. Affiliated with the Ranchi University, it offers degree courses in engineering.

Motiraj Devi Teachers Training College at Sandi, Ormanjhi offers a degree course in education.

== Healthcare ==
Two big hospitals, Medanta and HCG, are located in Ormanjhi off 2 days Tuesday and Saturday.
