= Dhenkikote =

Village in Ghatgaon of Kendujhar district, Odisha, India

Coordinates: 21.498176°N 85.836622°E

Dhenkikote is a large village located in Ghatgaon of Kendujhar district, Odisha, India with total 559 families residing. The Dhenkikote village has population of 2341 of which 1185 are males while 1156 are females as per Population Census 2011. Doghar, Kapaspada, Langalkanti and Tikira are the nearby villages to Dhenkikote.
