= Charhi railway station =

Railway station in Jharkhand, India

CHARHI

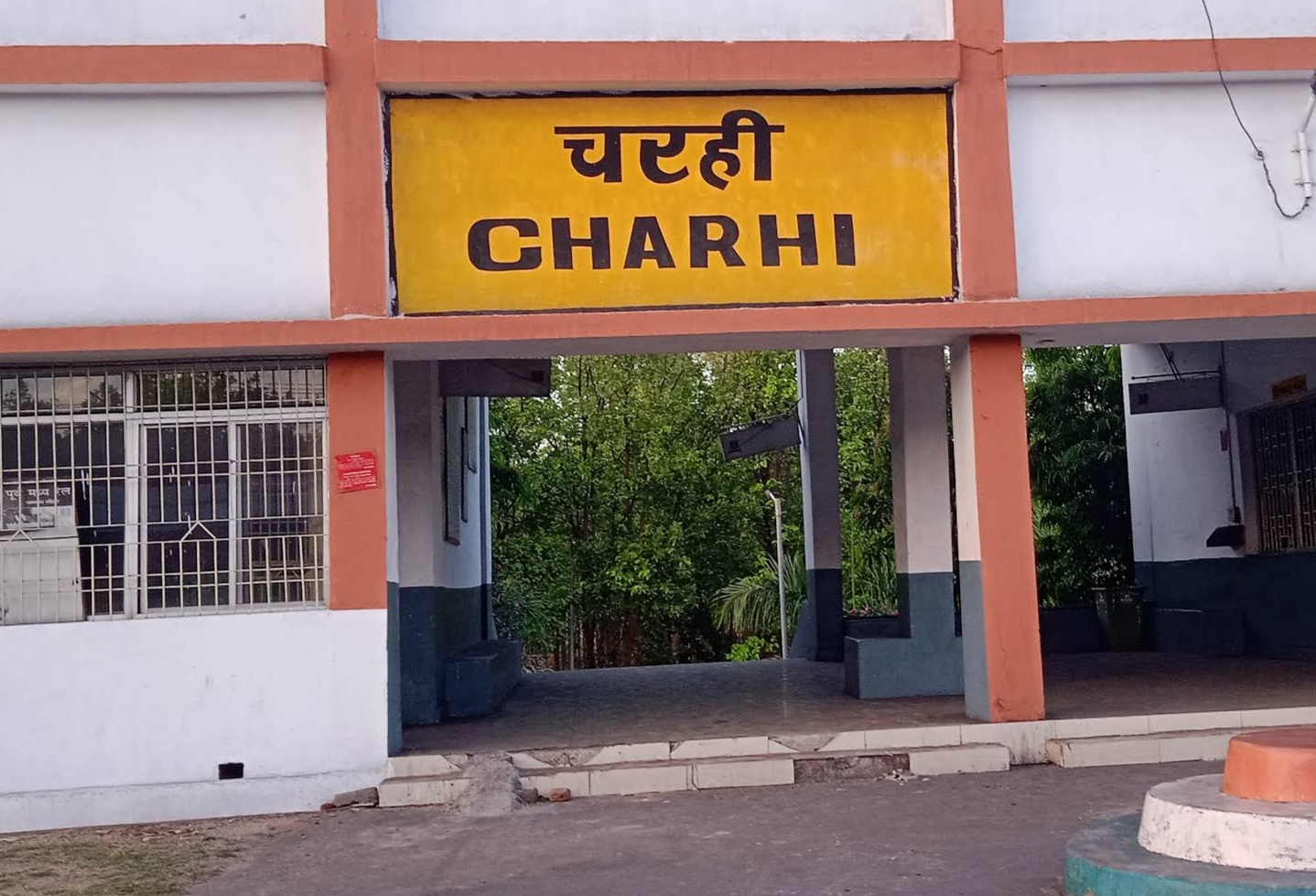
- Charhi railway station

General information
- Location: Charhi, Hazaribagh district, Jharkhand; India
- Coordinates: 23.8421°N 85.4418°E
- System: Indian Railways station
- Line: Koderma–Hazaribagh–Barkakana–Ranchi line

Other information
- Status: Functional
- Station code: CHRI
- Zone(s): East Central Railway
- Division(s): Dhanbad
Location
- Location within India Location within Jharkhand

Charhi Railway Station is a station on the Koderma–Hazaribagh–Barkakana line in Churchu (community development block), Hazaribagh district, Jharkhand, serving Charhi and nearby areas.

Charhi railway station is located at an altitude of 453 m above mean sea level. Hazaribagh Town is 27 km and Barkakana is 30 km from Charhi.

== History ==
This line was announced in Railway Budget 1999 under the rule of Atal Bihari Vajpayee. After 16 years, this dream was fulfilled on 20 February 2015. It was inaugurated by Prime Minister Narendra Modi along with Jharkhand Governor Syed Ahmad, Chief Minister Raghubar Das, Union Railways Minister Suresh Prabhu, Union Minister of State for Railways Manoj Sinha, Union Minister of State for Finance and Hazaribagh MP Jayant Sinha. 57 km long Hazaribagh–Barkakana section was opened for passenger trains on 7 December 2016 by Railway Minister Suresh Prabhu in the presence of Chief Minister Raghubar Das. Also a railway coal siding line has been constructed from Hazaribagh Town to Bandag.

New Railway line between Tatisilwai and Sanki was inaugurated by CM Raghubar Das on 29 August 2019. Two new pairs of passenger trains between Hatia and Sanki station started on 29 August 2019. Trial run on the newly constructed remaining Sidhwar-Sanki 27 kilometer rail section was successful on November 18 2022. 4 tunnels, 32 curves and five major bridges have been constructed in this 27 km long rail section.

== Trains ==
Charhi railway station handles trains four times daily. The trains are run by East Central Railway zone. Following are the trains arriving and departing from Charhi railway station.

Passenger Trains
| Sl.No. | Train No. | Train Name |
|---|---|---|
| 1 | 53371 | Koderma–Barkakana Passenger |
| 2 | 53372 | Barkakana–Koderma Passenger |
| 3 | 53373 | Koderma–Barkakana Passenger |
| 4 | 53374 | Barkakana–Koderma Passenger |
