= Maa Tarini Temple, Ghatgaon =

Maa Tarini Temple
- ମା ତାରିଣୀ ମନ୍ଦିର, ଘଟଗାଁ
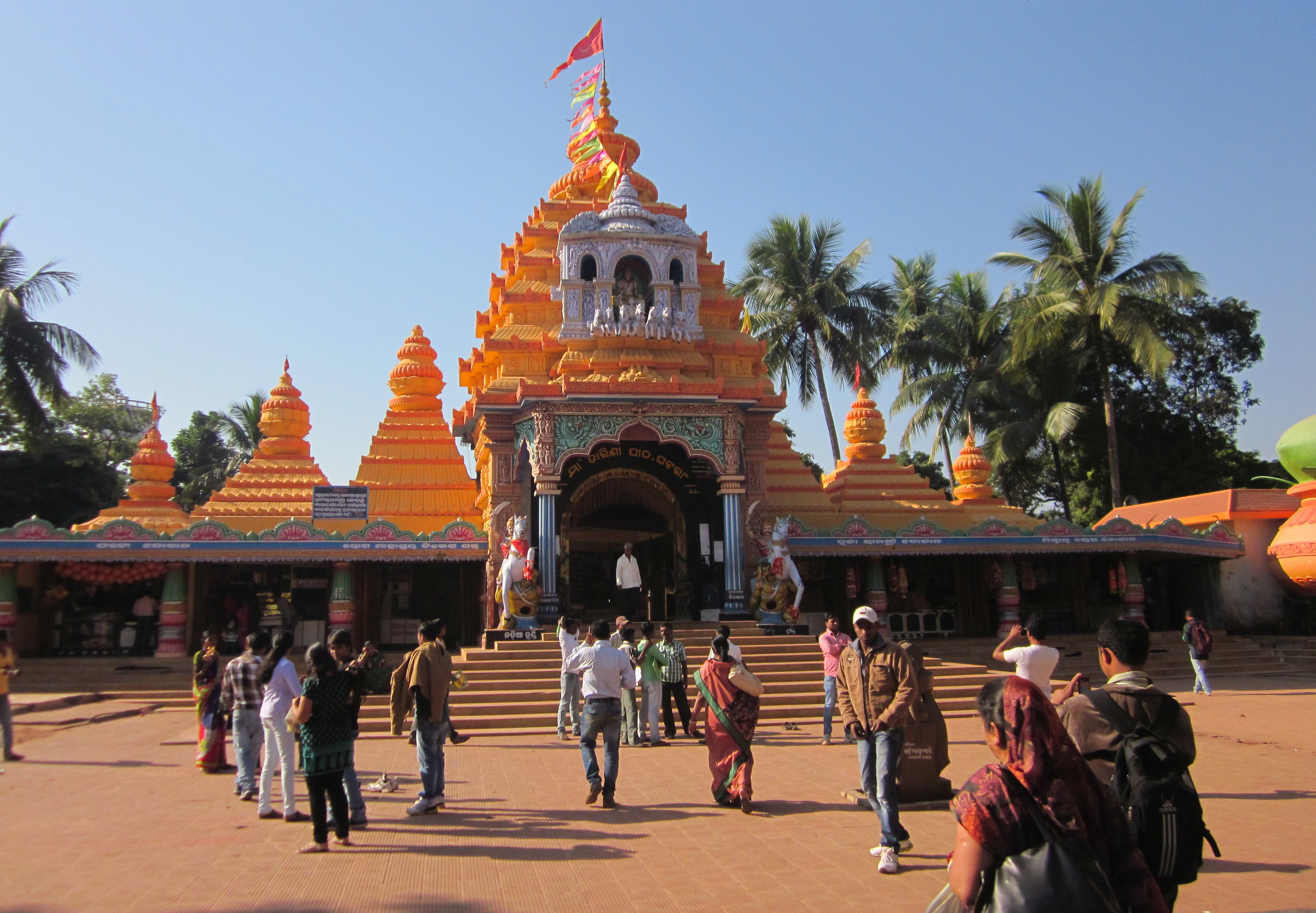

- Location in Odisha

Religion
- Affiliation: Hinduism
- District: Kendujhar
- Deity: Maa Tarini
- Festival: Patua Yatra

Location
- Location: Ghatgaon
- State: Odisha
- Country: India
- Coordinates: 21°23′N 85°53′E

Architecture
- Type: Kalinga Architecture

Website
- http://maatarini.nic.in/

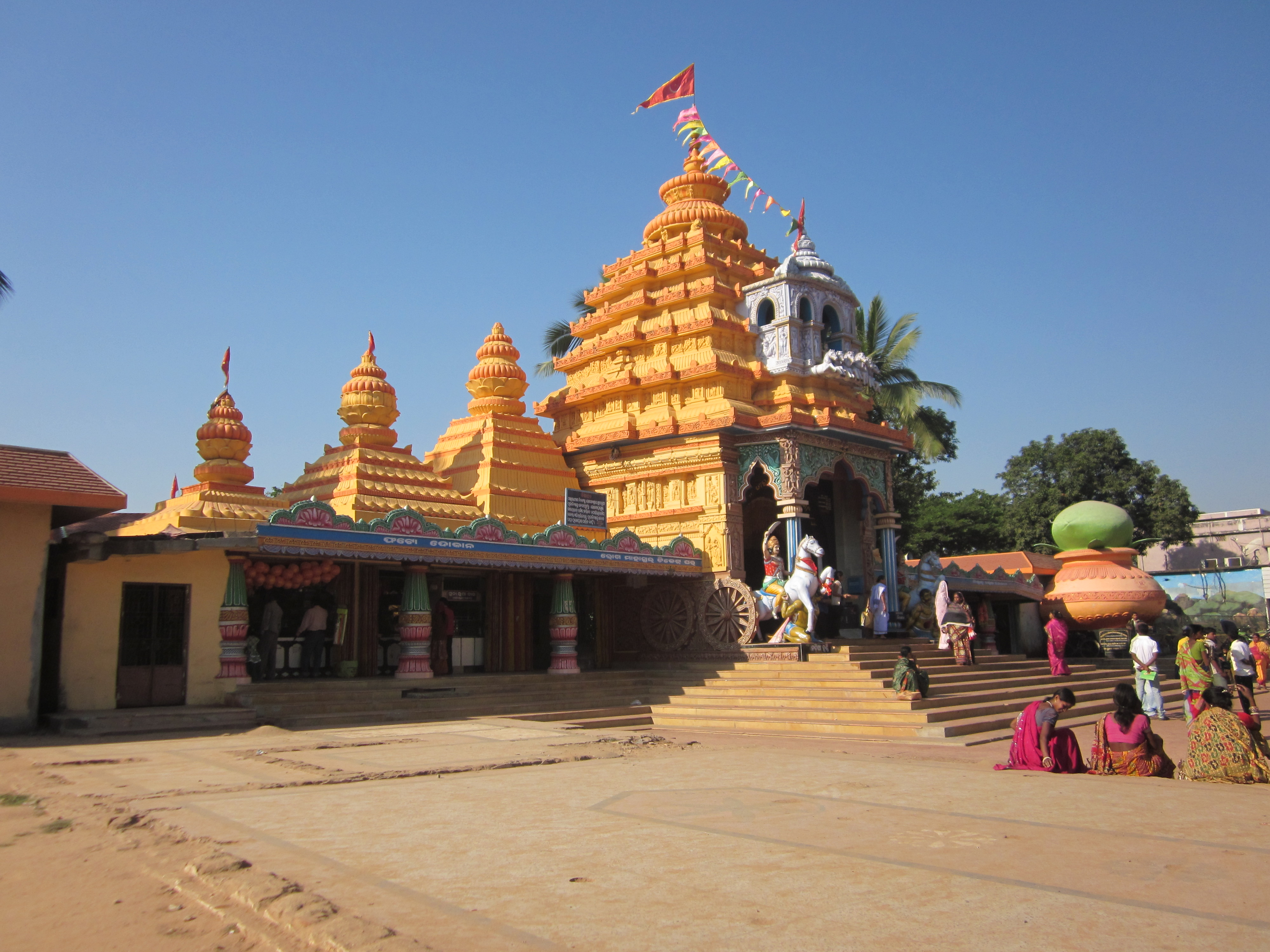
Maa Tarini Temple, Ghatgaon, Side View

The Maa Tarini Temple (Odia: ମା ତାରିଣୀ ମନ୍ଦିର) in Ghatgaon, Odisha, India, is dedicated to the Hindu goddess Maa Tarini.

== Gallery ==
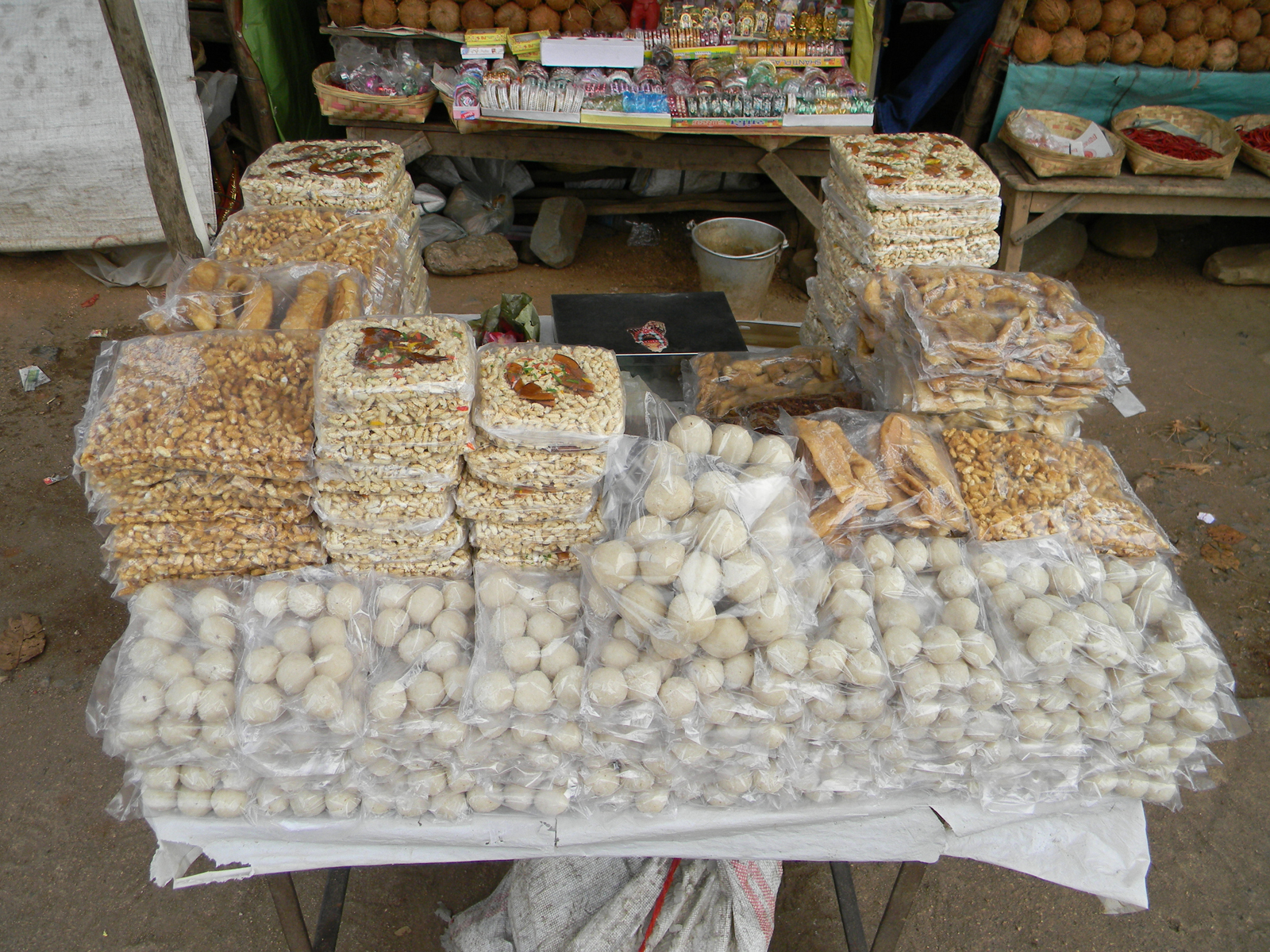

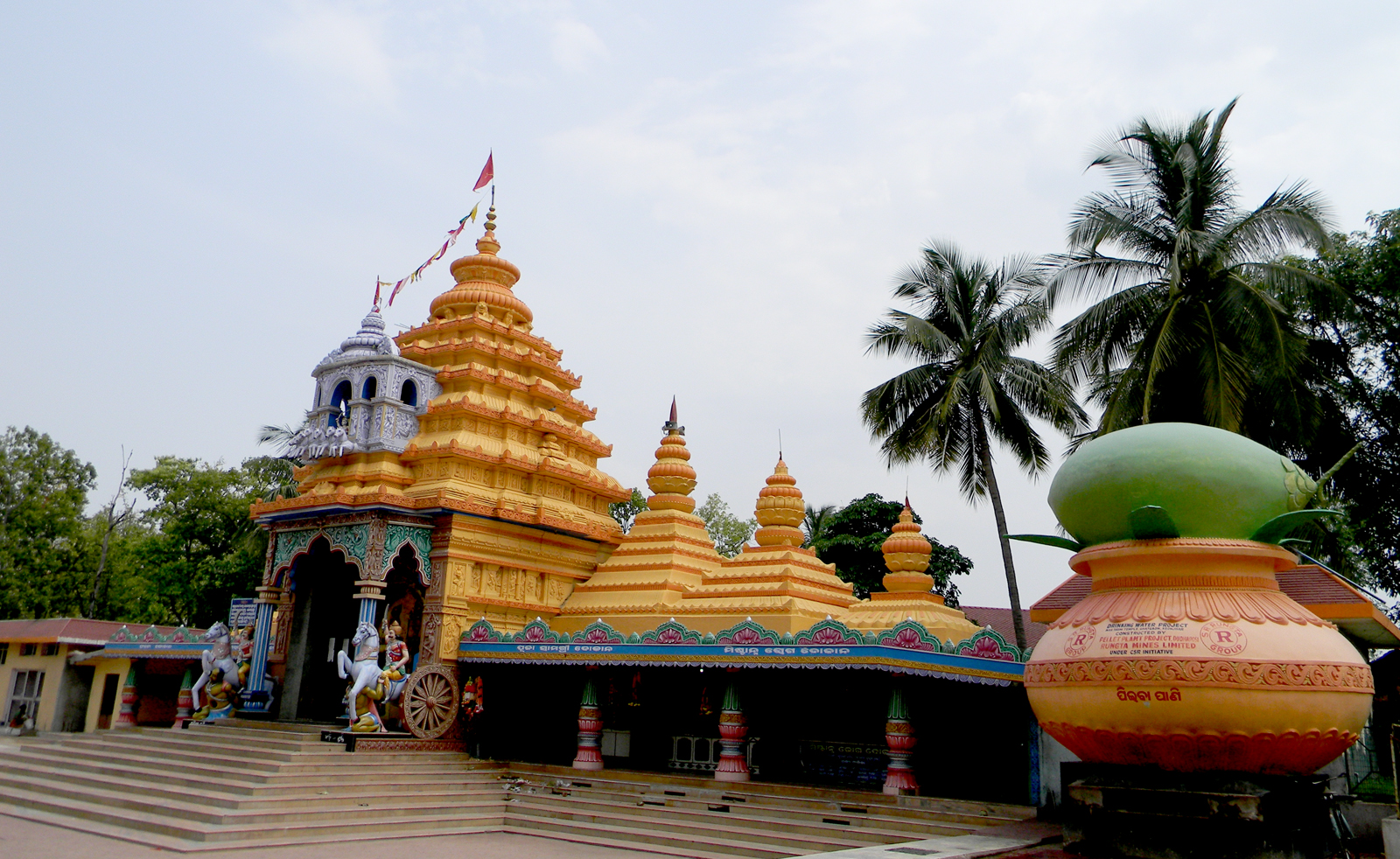

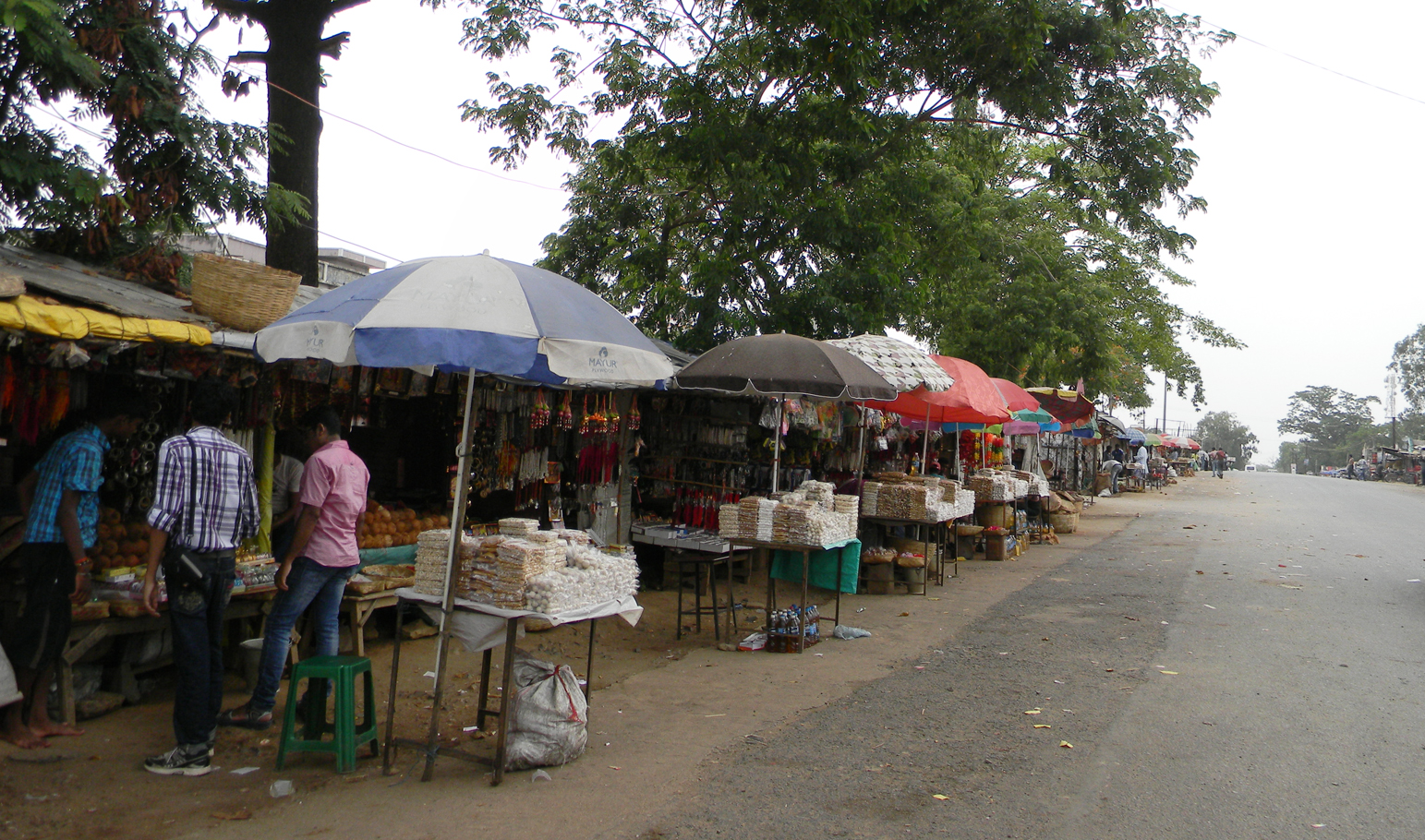

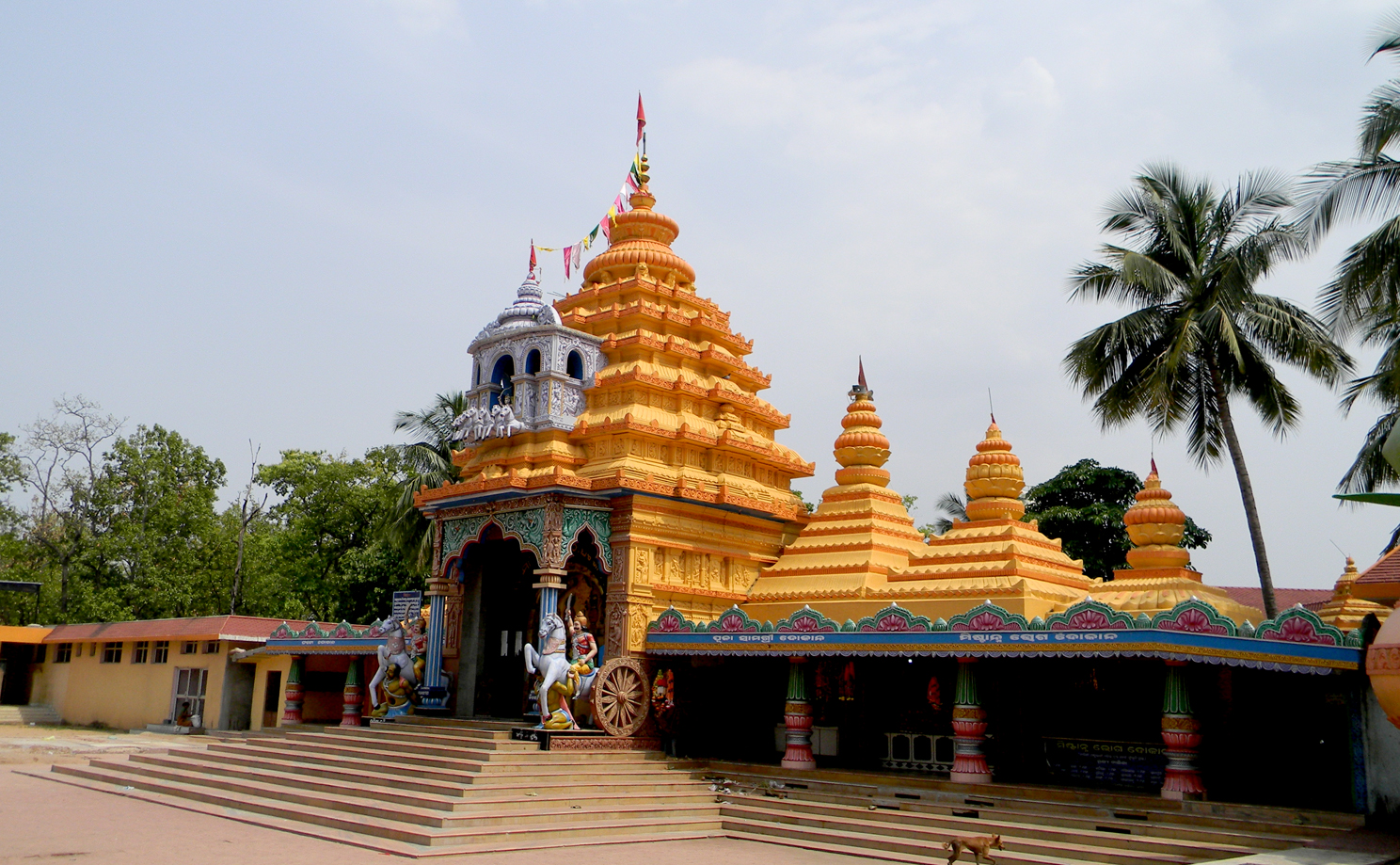

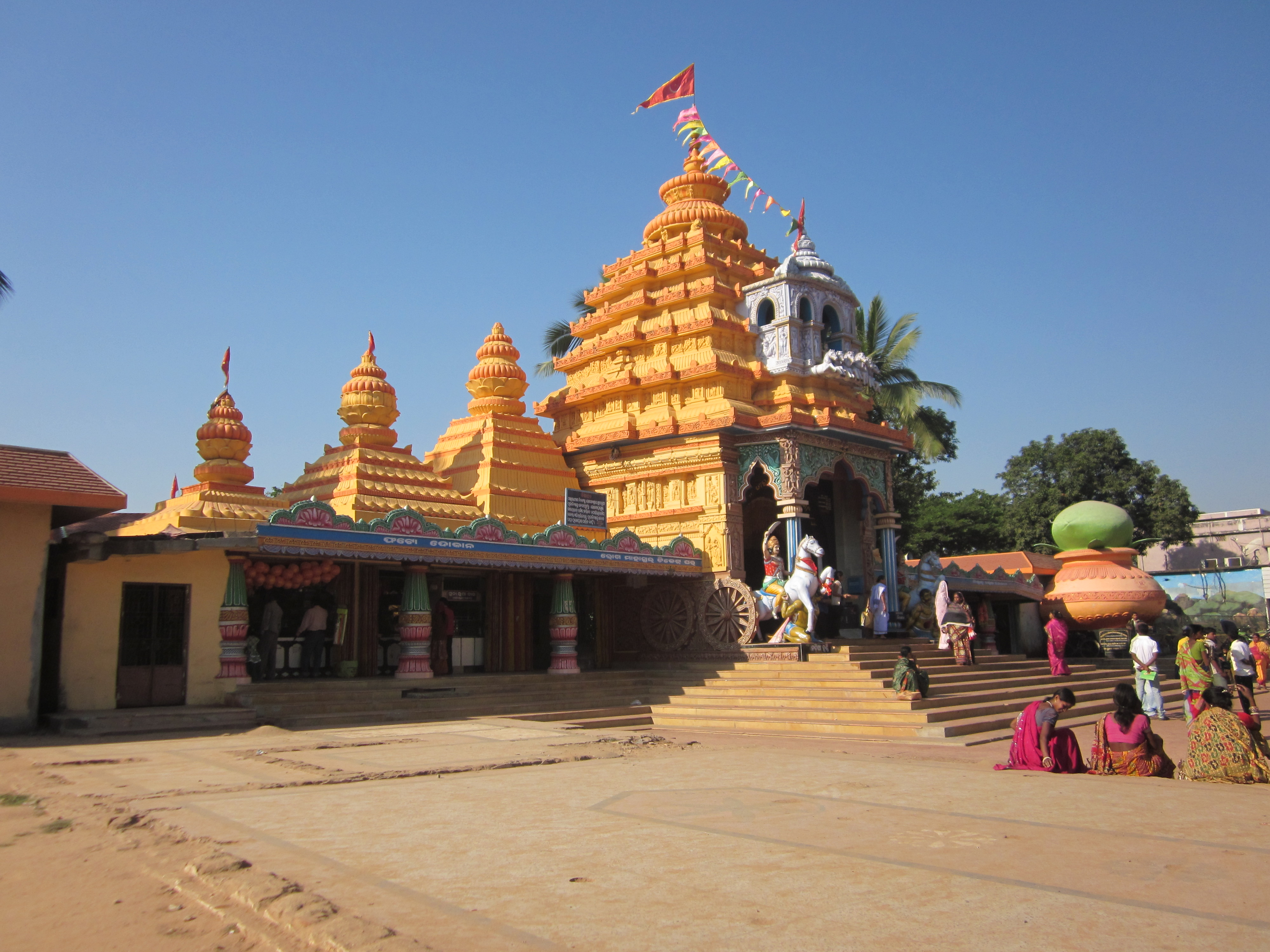
SIde view of Maa tarini Temple

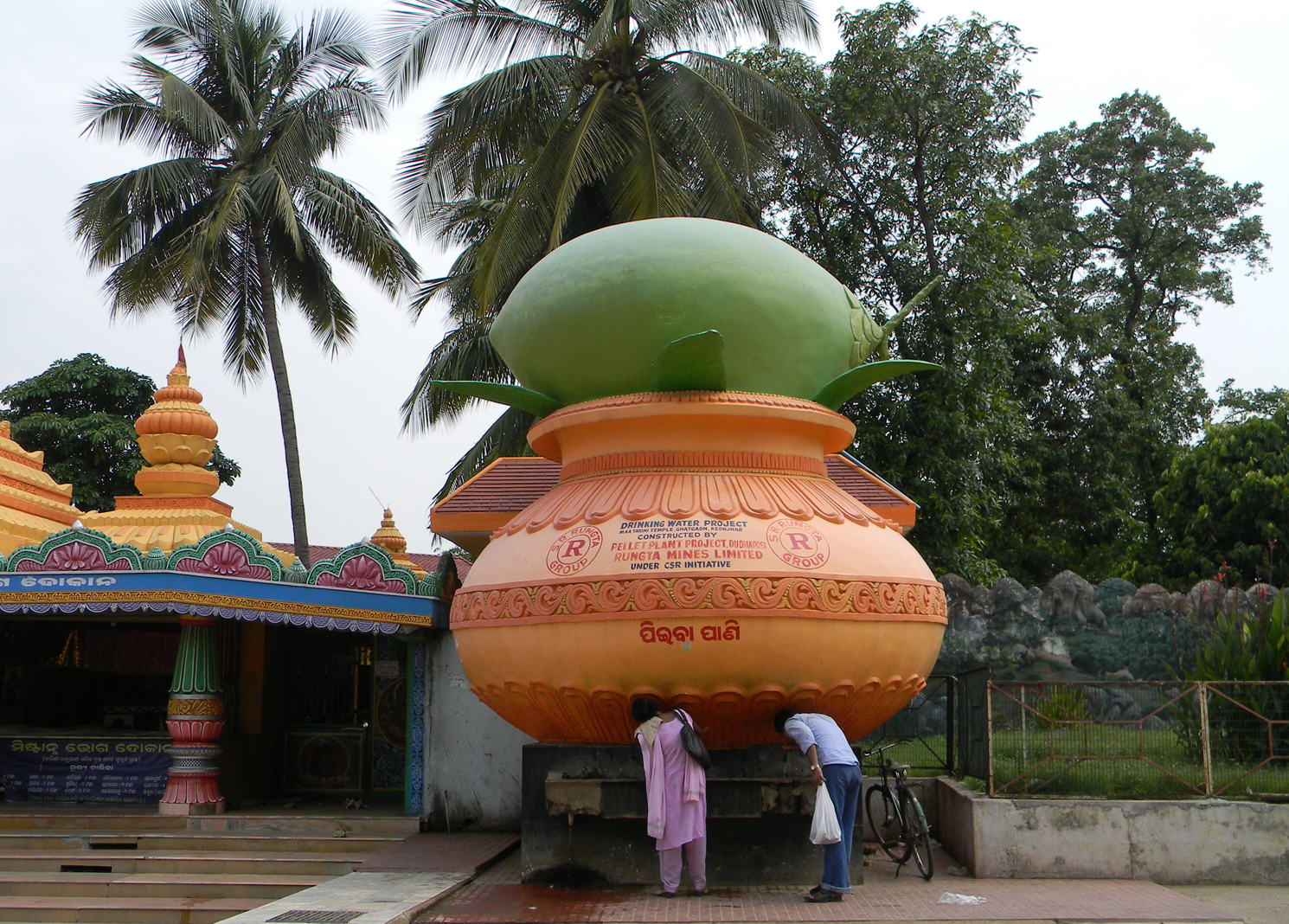
Drinking Water

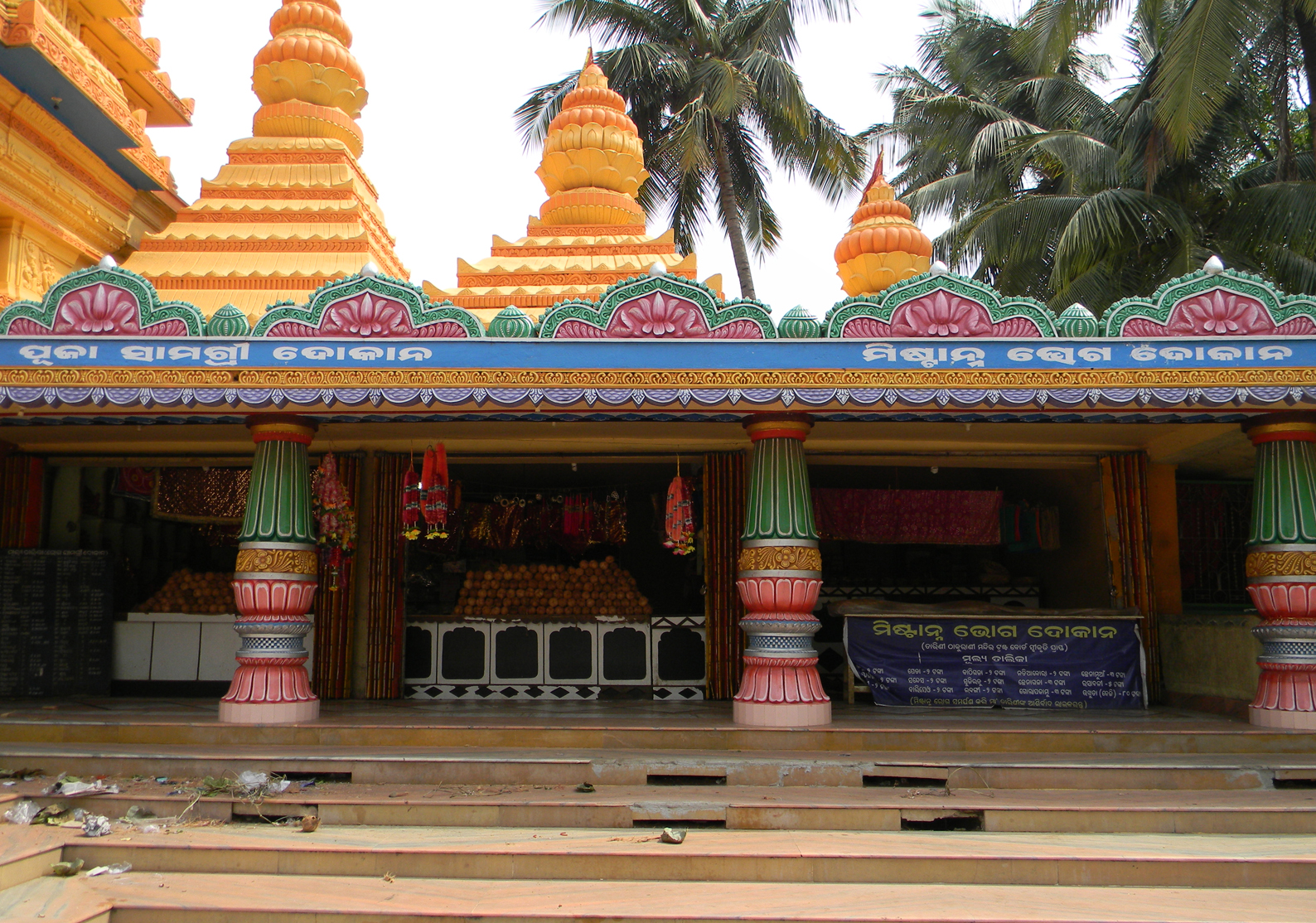
Shops inside temple campus
