= Getalsud Dam =

Getalsud Dam (Rukka Dam)
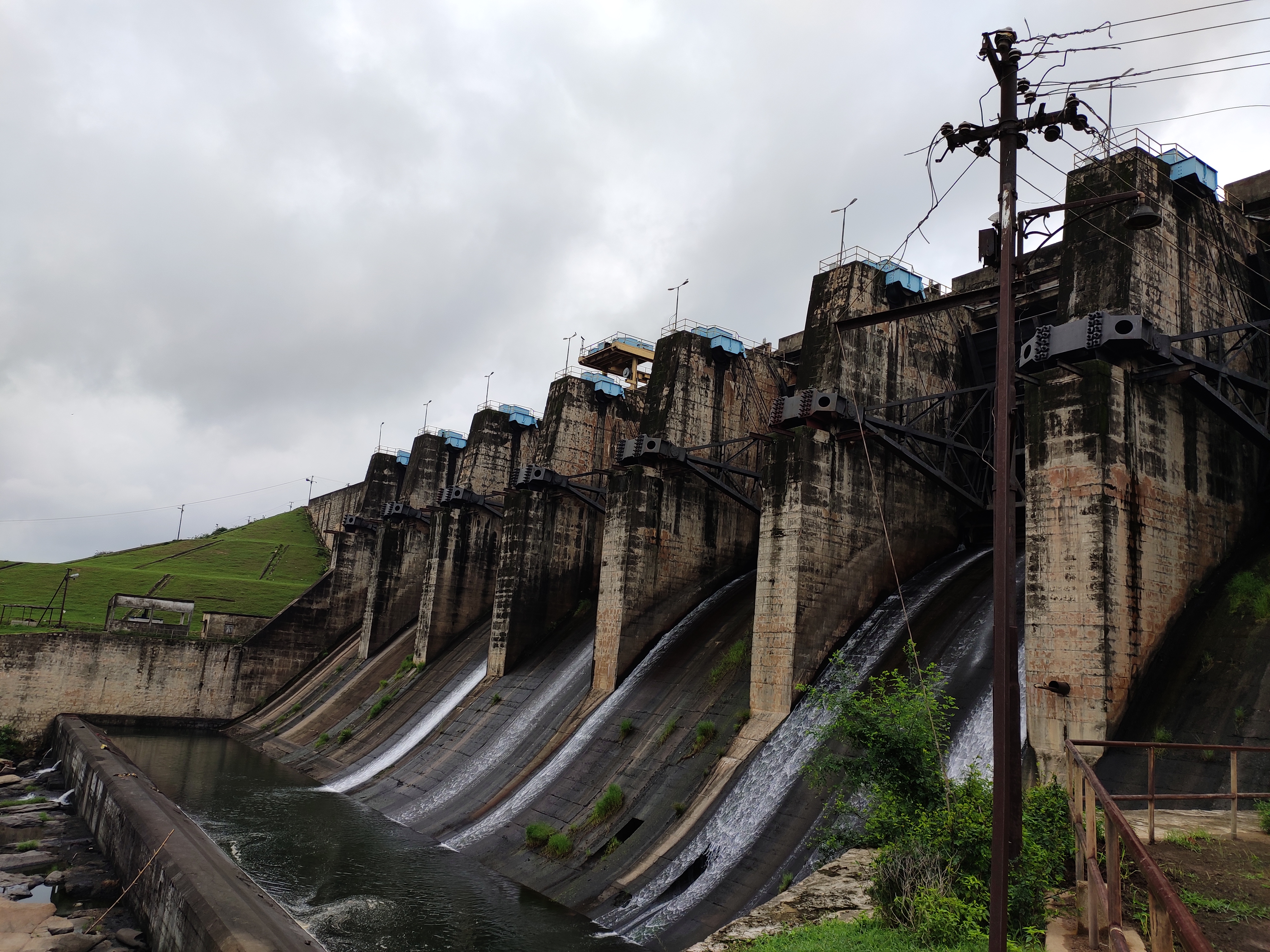
- Getalsud Dam, Jharkhand

- Location in Jharkhand
- Country: India
- Location: Ormanjhi, Ranchi, Jharkhand
- Coordinates: 23°27′24″N 85°33′19″E
- Status: Functional
- Opening date: 1971
- Owner: JSEB

Dam and spillways
- Type of dam: Concrete gravity dam
- Impounds: Subarnarekha River
- Height: 116 ft (35 m)

Reservoir
- Catchment area: 717 km^{2} (277 sq mi)
- Normal elevation: 1,954 ft (596 m)

Power Station
- Operator: JSEB
- Turbines: 2 x 65 MW Francis-type
- Installed capacity: 130 MW

Getalsud Dam is an artificial reservoir situated in Ormanjhi, Ranchi, Jharkhand. It was constructed across the Subarnarekha River and was opened in 1971. It is a popular picnic spot for the residents of Ranchi and Ramgarh District. The dam provides a small-scale fishing opportunity to the local people of Rukka. The main purpose of the dam is to fulfill the drinking water requirements of the residents of Ranchi. Apart from that, it is used for industrial purposes and generating electricity.

== Geography ==
Cities, towns and locations in Ranchi district in South Chotanagpur Division
M: municipality, CT: census town, R: rural/ urban centre, N: neighbourhood, T: tourist centre, D: dam, H: historical/ religious centre
Owing to space constraints in the small map, the actual locations in a larger map may vary slightly

=== Location ===
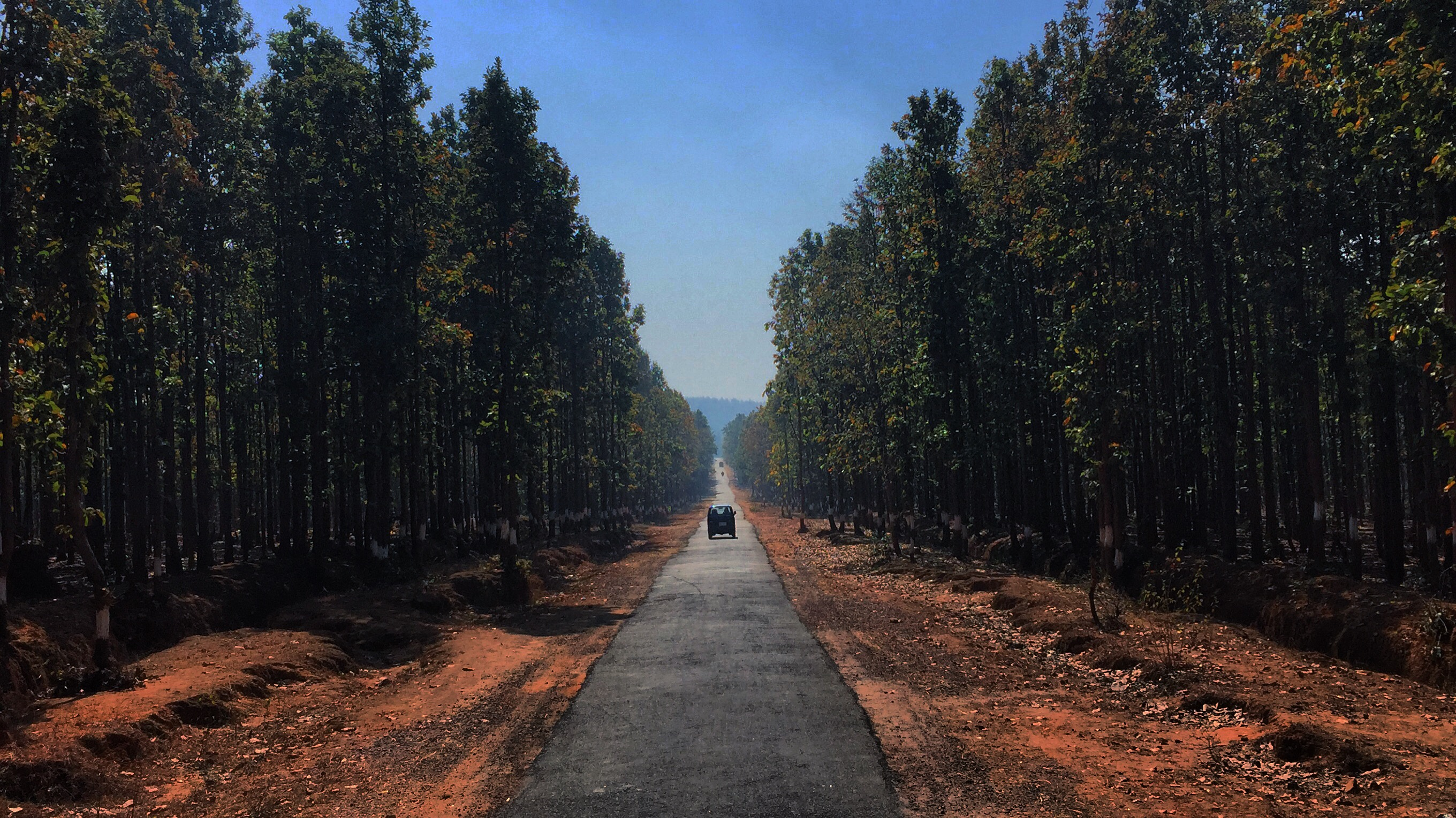
Way to Getalsud Dam

The dam is located on the north-eastern edge of Chota Nagpur Plateau. It is situated in Rukka Block, because of which it is locally known as Rukka Dam.The Getalsud Dam is around 35 km from Ranchi and around 30 km from Ramgarh.

Note: The map alongside presents some of the notable locations in the district. All places marked in the map are linked in the larger full screen map.

== Overview ==
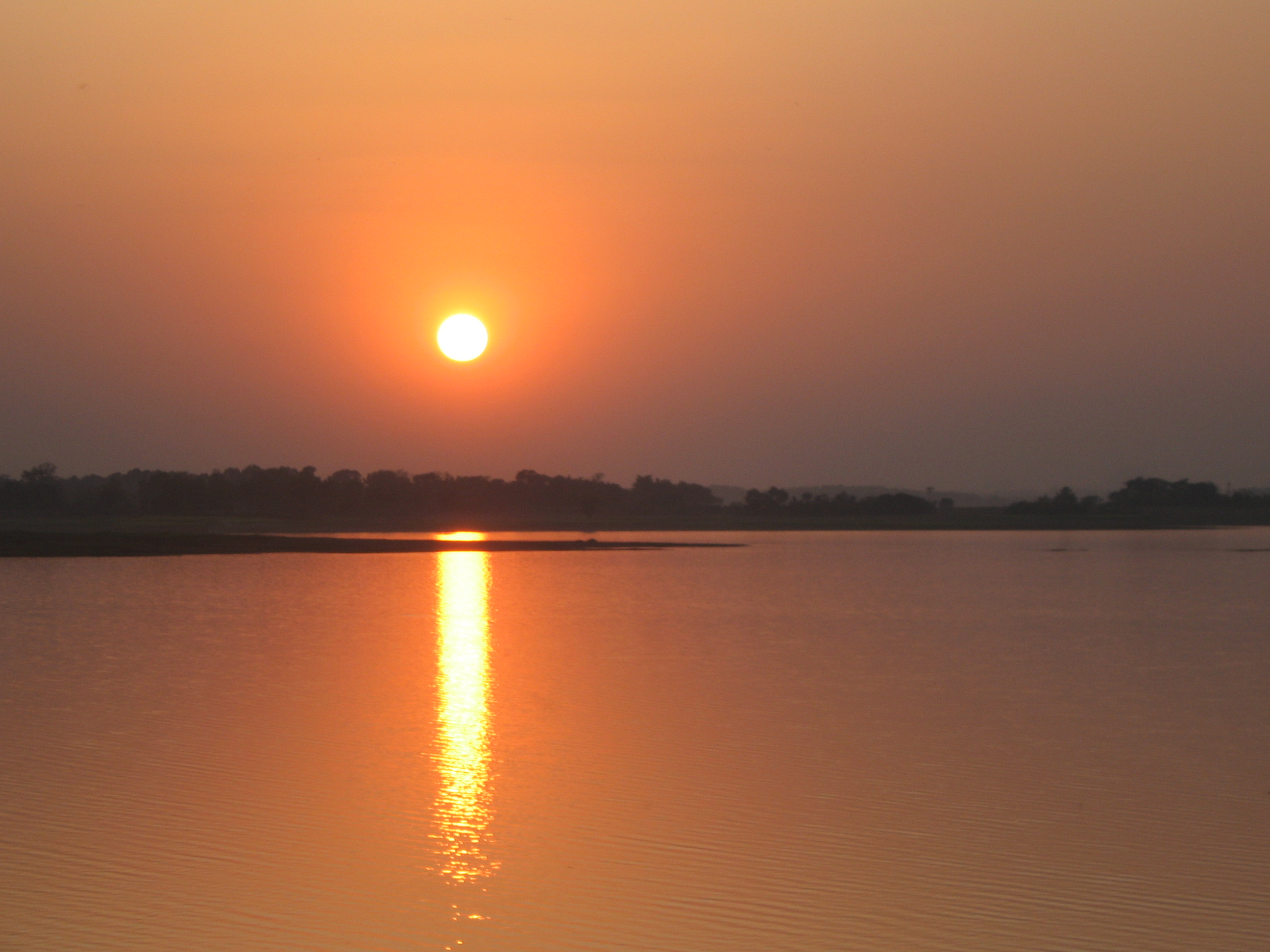
Sunset across Getalsud Dam

The Getalsud Dam is located on the Subarnarekha River. The reservoir, with a catchment area of 717 km^{2}, has a full reservoir level of 1,954 ft. It has gross storage capacity of 288.76 million cubic meters (MCM) It was envisaged to meet the drinking water demands of Ranchi city as well as industrial requirements of Heavy Engineering Corporation Ltd at Hatia and other factories. The power generation from the Getalsud Dam is stopped once the level reaches to 1917 ft to ensure that sufficient water is available for drinking purposes. The nearby areas to dam are also user for picnic spot by the people of Ranchi and Ramghar. Also you can find a huge rush during the time of New Year and Chhath.
