= Charhi =

- Census Town
- Location in Jharkhand, India Charhi (India)
- Coordinates: 23.876222°N 85.445222°E
- Country: India
- State: Jharkhand
- District: Hazaribagh

Government
  - Type: Federal democracy
- Elevation: 308 m (1,010 ft)

Population (2011)
  - Total: 6,842

Languages (*For language details see Churchu (community development block)#Language and religion)
  - Official: Hindi, Urdu
- Time zone: UTC+5:30 (IST)
- PIN: 825336 (Charhi)
- Telephone/ STD code: 06545
- Vehicle registration: JH 02
- Website: hazaribag.nic.in

Charhi is a census town in the Churchu CD block in the Hazaribagh Sadar subdivision of the Hazaribagh district in the Indian state of Jharkhand.

== Geography ==
Cities, towns and locations in Hazaribagh district in North Chotanagpur Division
Some census towns and locations around Hazaribagh city have been shown in the Hazaribagh City map
M: municipality, CT: census town, R: rural/ urban centre, T: tourist centre, D: dam, HS: hot spring
Owing to space constraints in the small map, the actual locations in a larger map may vary slightly

=== Location ===
Charhi is located at 23.876222°N 85.445222°E.

=== Area overview ===
Hazaribagh district is a plateau area and forests occupy around about 45% of the total area. It is a predominantly rural area with 92.34% of the population living in rural areas against 7.66% in the urban areas. There are many census towns in the district, as can be seen in the map alongside. Agriculture is the main occupation of the people but with the extension of coal mines, particularly in the southern part of the district, employment in coal mines is increasing. However, it has to be borne in mind that modern mining operations are highly mechanised. Four operational areas of Central Coalfields are marked on the map. All these areas are spread across partly this district and partly the neighbouring districts.

Note: The map alongside presents some of the notable locations in the district. All places marked in the map are linked in the larger full screen map. Urbanisation data calculated on the basis of census data for CD blocks and may vary a little against unpublished official data.

== Civic administration ==
=== Police station ===
Charhi police station serves the Churchu CD block.

== Demographics ==
According to the 2011 Census of India, Charhi had a total population of 6,842, of which 3,611 (53%) were males and 3,231 (47%) were females. Population in the age range 0–6 years was 840. The total number of literates in Charhi was 4,971 (82.82% of the population over 6 years).

== Infrastructure ==
According to the District Census Handbook 2011, Hazaribagh, Charhi covered an area of 3.79 km^{2}. Among the civic amenities, it had 5 km roads with open drains, the protected water supply involved hand pump, uncovered well. It had 1,188 domestic electric connections, 5 road lighting points. Among the educational facilities it had 6 primary schools, 3 middle schools, 5 secondary schools, the nearest senior secondary school at Hazaribagh 20 km away. Among the social, recreational and cultural facilities, it had 1 auditorium/ community hall. Three important commodities it manufactured were gate/ grill, furniture, soil item. It had the branch offices of 2 nationalised banks, 1 cooperative bank, 1 agricultural credit society.

== Economy ==
Projects in the Hazaribagh Area of Central Coalfields are: Parej East OC, Kedla UG, Kedla OC, Tapin OC, Jharkhand OC, Kedla Washery and Regional R/Workshop.

== Transport ==
Charhi railway station is a station on the Koderma–Hazaribagh–Barkakana–Ranchi line

National Highway 20 passes through Charhi.

== Education ==
Adarsh Inter College at Karukhap, PO Jarwa, PS Charhi was established in 2005. It offers courses in arts, science and commerce.

Marshi Marshal School at NH 33, PO+PS Charhi, Near State Bank of India, Charhi Branch. It offers courses up to Senior Secondary and it is affiliated with Jharkhand Academic Council (JAC) Board .

=== Skill training ===
Sanmat "Sri Someswar Nath Mahadev Trust" is running skill centre at Charhi for women to train and economically empower them. Sanmat being partner to Jharkhand skill development mission, Jharkhand Government.
