= Ghatgaon =

Ghatgaon Ghatagaon
- Census Town
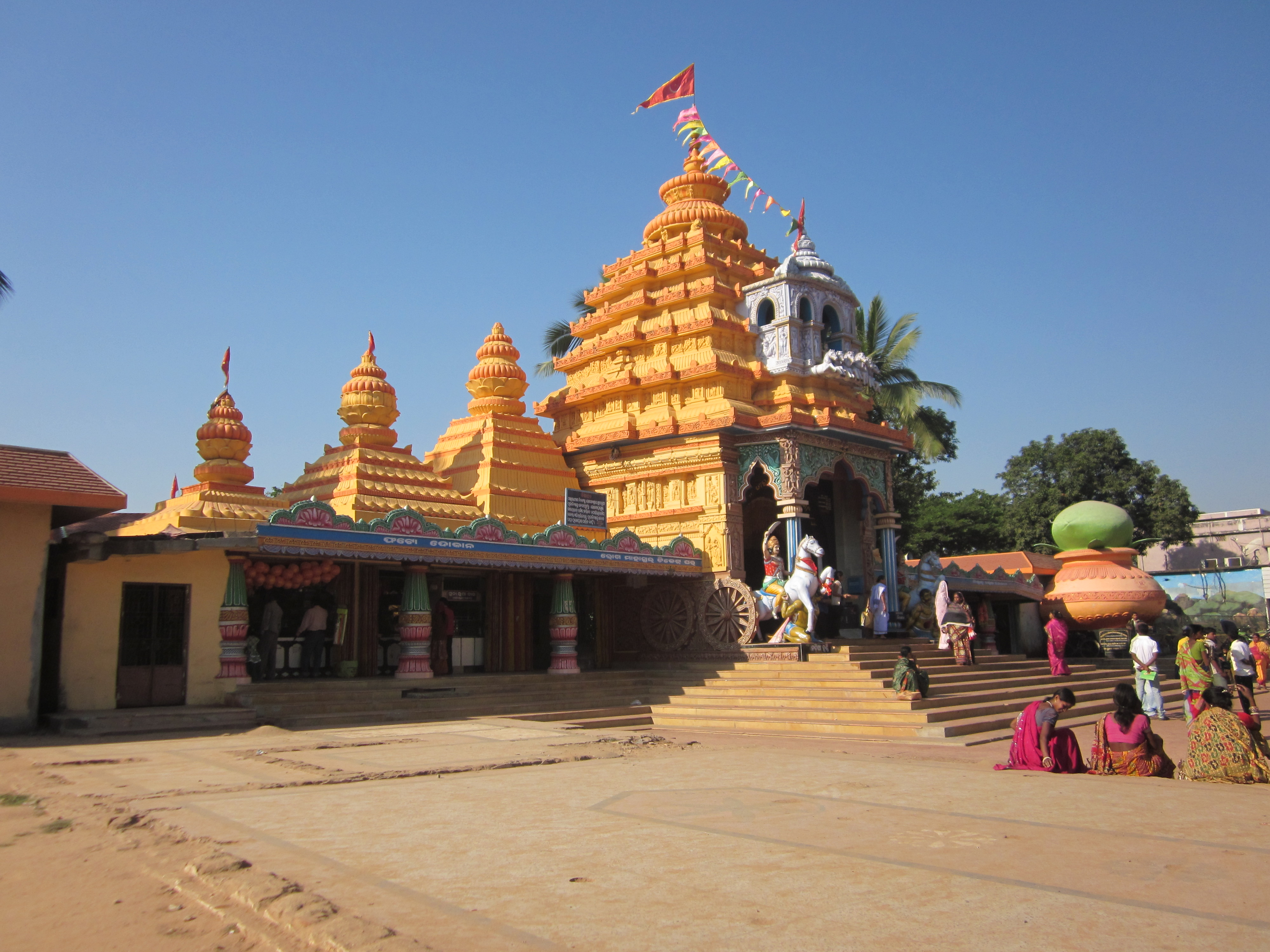
- Maa Tarini Temple of Ghatgaon

- Location in Odisha, India Ghatgaon (India)
- Coordinates: 21°24′0″N 85°53′0″E
- Country: India
- State: Odisha
- District: Kendujhar
- Named for: Maa Tarini
- Elevation: 330 m (1,080 ft)

Languages
  - Official: Odia
  - Other local language: Ho
- Time zone: UTC+5:30 (IST)
- PIN: 758027
- Telephone code: 6733
- Vehicle registration: OD-09
- Website: odisha.gov.in

Ghatagaon, is a Census town in Kendujhar District, Odisha, India.

== Geography ==
It is located at 21°24′0″N 85°53′0″E at an elevation of 330 m above MSL.

== Places of interest ==
Maa Tarini Temple: It is the main shrine of Maa Tarini who is regarded as the embodiments of Shakti. She is one of the chief presiding Goddess in Odia culture. Every year thousands of devotees visit the temple to worship Maa Tarini.

== Educational Institutions ==
- Tarini Thakurani (Degree) Mahavidyalaya
- Tarini Thakurani Higher Secondary School
- Tarini Girl's High School
- Ghatagaon Govt. Upper Primary School
- Kenduapada Nodal Primary School

== Transportation ==
By road

National Highway 20 passes through Ghatgaon. Buses are always available from many towns of Odisha like Kendujhar, Bhubaneswar, Cuttack, Bhadrak, Jajpur etc.

By rail

Nearest railway station is Harichandanpur railway station which is 16 km away.

By air

Nearest airport is Biju Patnaik Airport at Bhubaneswar which is 174 km away.
