= Panikoili =

Panikoili Alatri
- Village
- Interactive map of Panikoili
- Coordinates: 20.912229°N 86.229254°E
- Country: India
- State: Odisha
- District: Jajpur

Government
  - Type: Panchayat
  - Body: Panikoili G.P

Population
  - Total: 10,000

Languages
  - Official: Odia
- Time zone: UTC+5:30 (IST)
- PIN: 755043
- Telephone code: 06726
- Vehicle registration: OD-04
- Nearest city: Jajpur Keonjhar Road
- Climate: Tropical (Köppen)
- Website: odisha.gov.in

Panikoili is a Village in Jajpur district of Odisha state of eastern India.

It lies at the crossing of National Highway 16 and National Highway 20 (Previously NH 215). The closest significant towns are Jajpur and Keonjhar Road (now known as Byasanagar), about 10 km away. It lies on the center of Jajpur district. Panikoili is also the Police headquarter of Jajpur district.
