= Great Buddha (Bodh Gaya) =

Buddha Statue

The Great Buddha
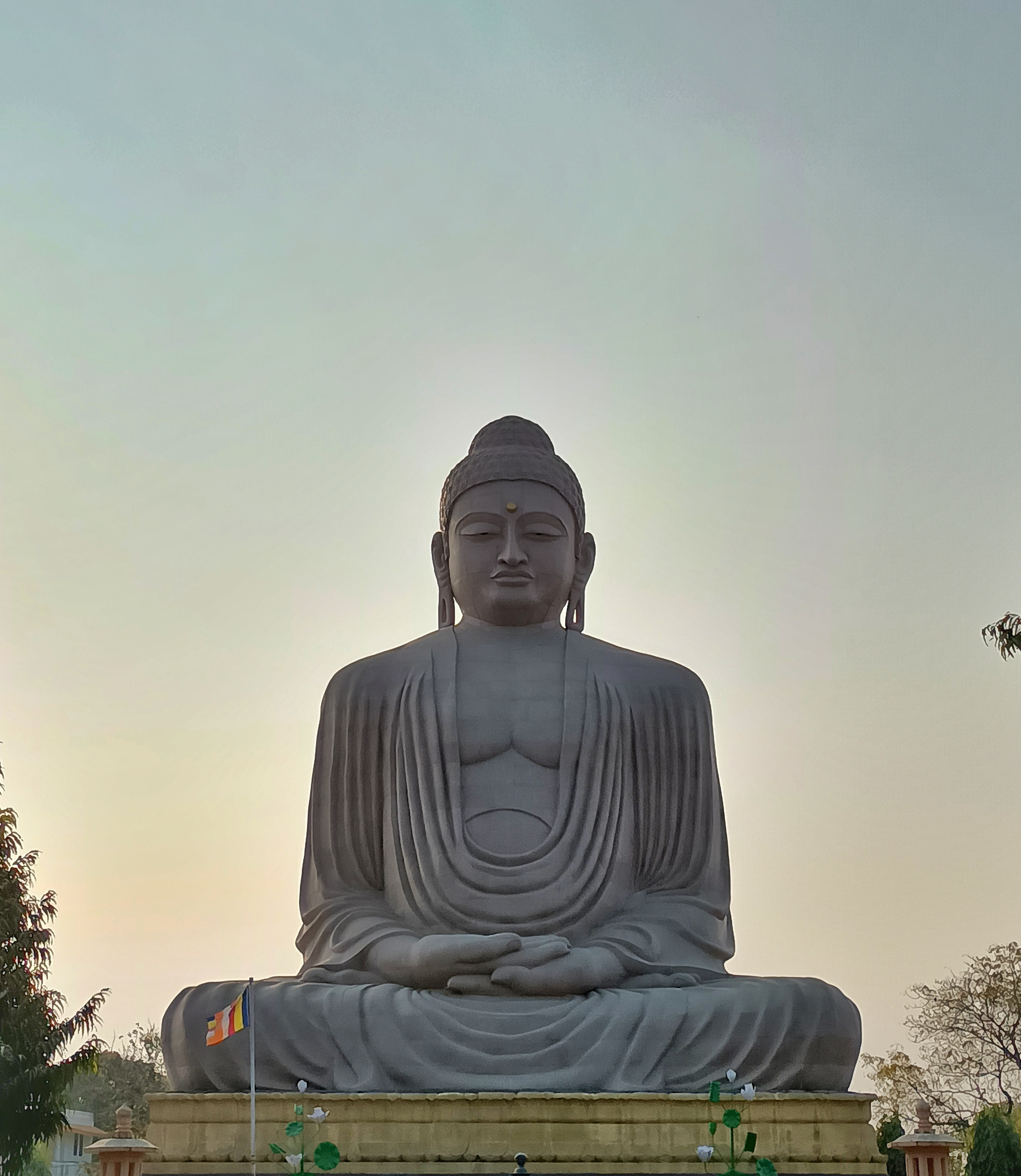
- The Great Buddha at Bodh Gaya

- Location of The Great Buddha, Bodh Gaya in Bihar, India
- Artist: V. Ganapati Sthapati
- Year: 1982 (started); 18 November 1989 (inaugurated)
- Type: Statue
- Medium: Mix of sandstone blocks and red granite.
- Dimensions: 19.5 m (64 ft) high /the height of the lotus 6 ft
- Location: Bodh Gaya, India; 24°41′25.7″N 84°58′54.5″E
- Owner: Daijokyo Buddhist Temple

The Great Buddha is a religious statue located at Bodh Gaya in Bihar, India. It is a Buddhist pilgrimage and tourist sight. The Great Buddha was possibly the largest Buddha statue in India at the time and was consecrated on 18 November 1989 by the 14th Dalai Lama. The foundation stone for the statue was laid in 1982.

The statue was designed by V. Ganapati Sthapati and took seven years to complete using the labor of 12,000 stonemasons. It is constructed from a combination of sandstone and red granite blocks. A hollow spiral staircase inside the statue leads from the ground up to the chest. Shelves on the interior walls display 16,300 small bronze images of the Buddha. The Great Buddha statue is located in a garden at the end of Temple Street and is surrounded by smaller sculptures of Buddha's ten principal disciples, five on each side.

The statue is 18.5 m (61 ft) high representing the Buddha seated in a meditation pose, or dhyana mudra, on a lotus in the open air. The total height of the construction is 80 ft (24 m) of which the Buddha makes up 64 ft (20 m), the lotus on which the Buddha sits 5 ft (1.5 m) and the lower pedestal 10 ft (3.0 m). The construction's width is nearly 60 ft (18 m) at its maximum.
