= Bodh Gaya =

Historical city in Bihar, India

- Town
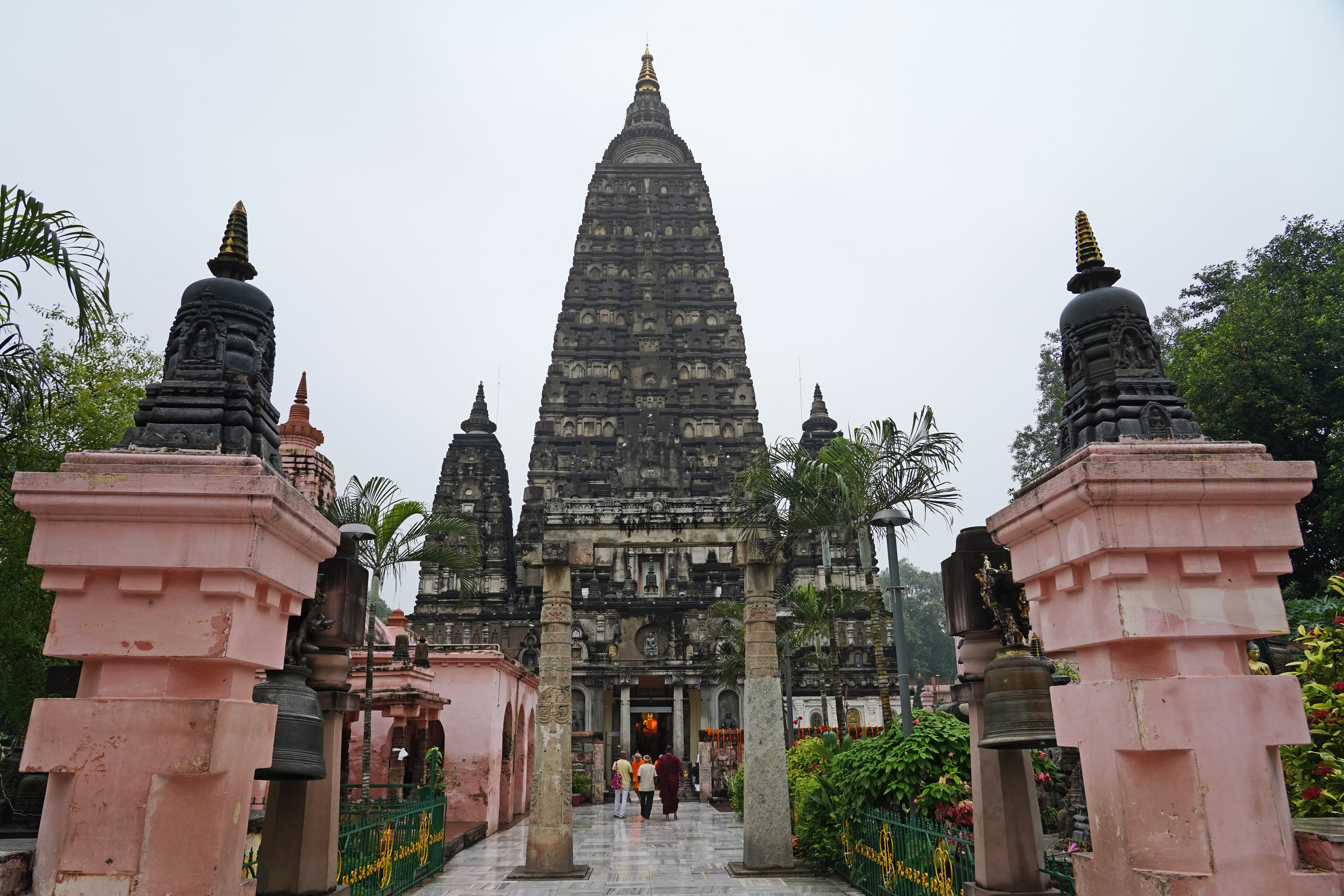
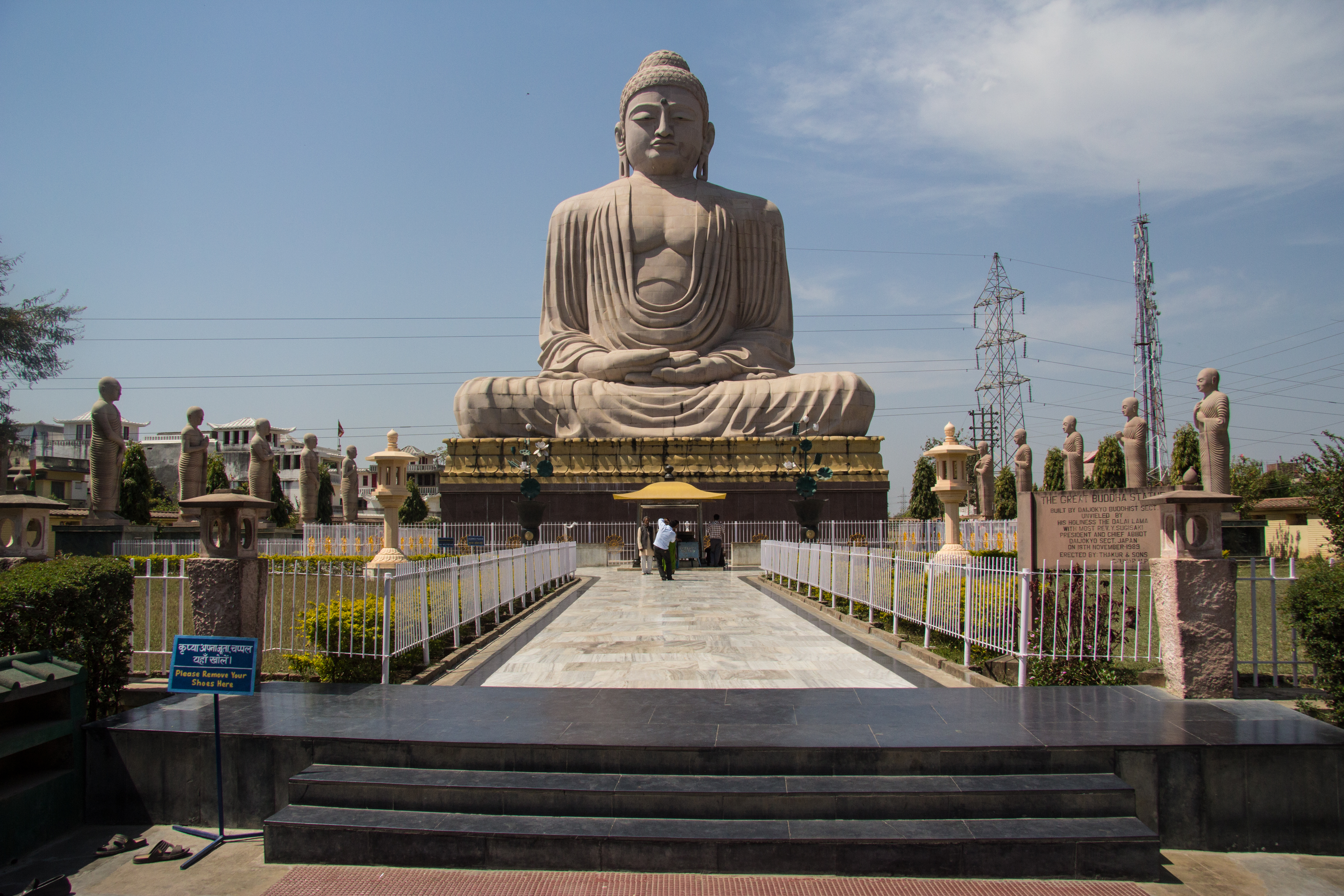
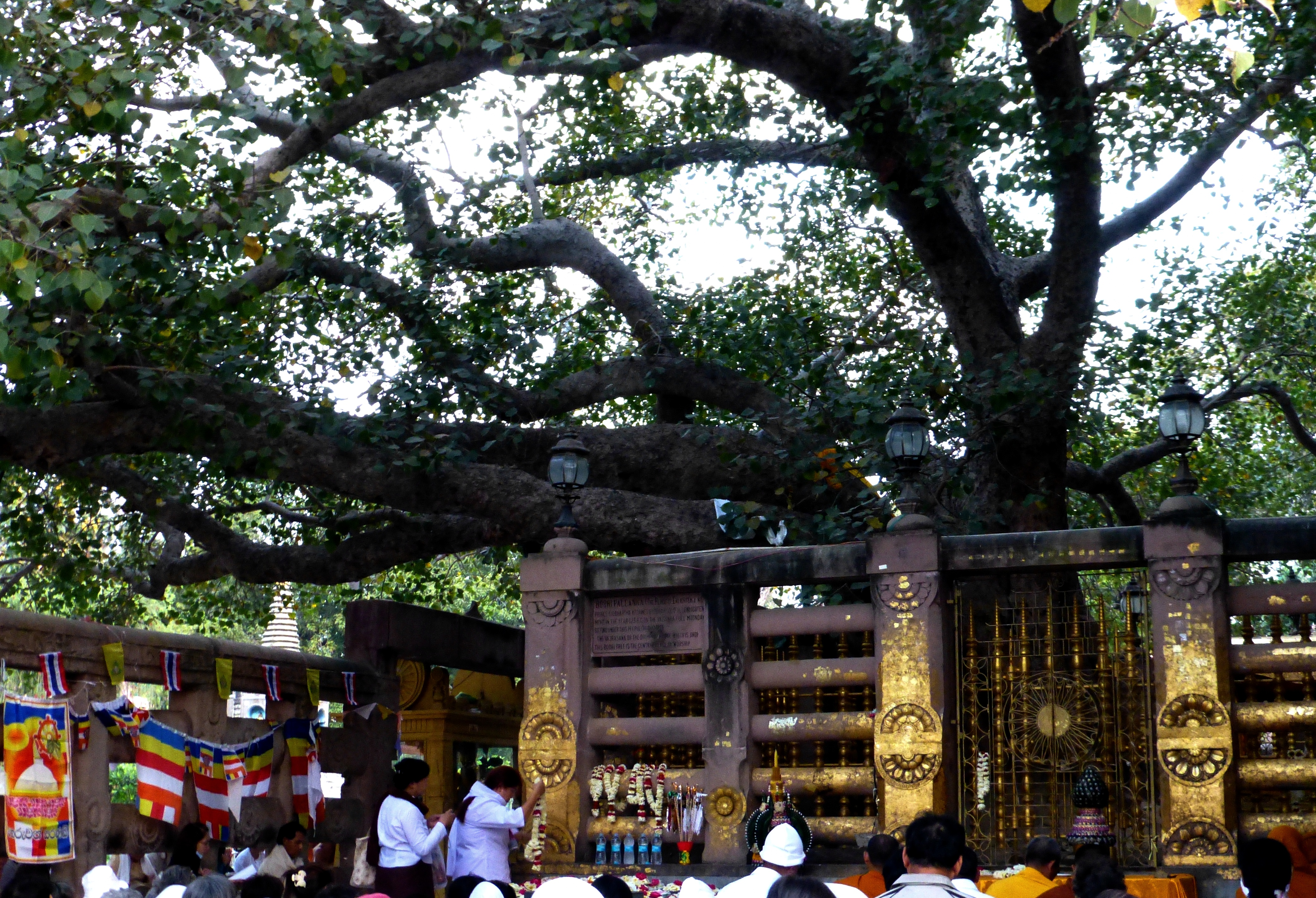
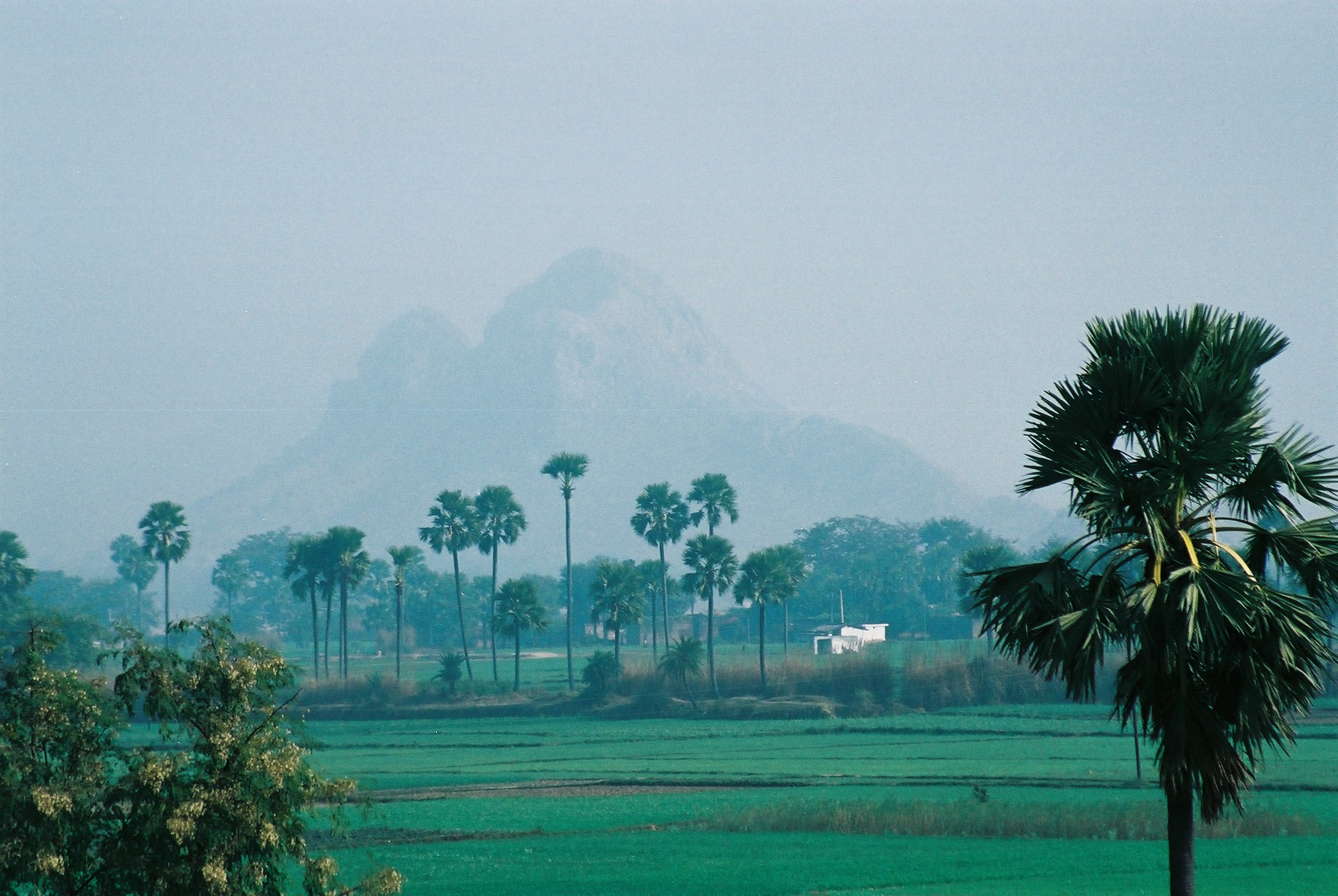
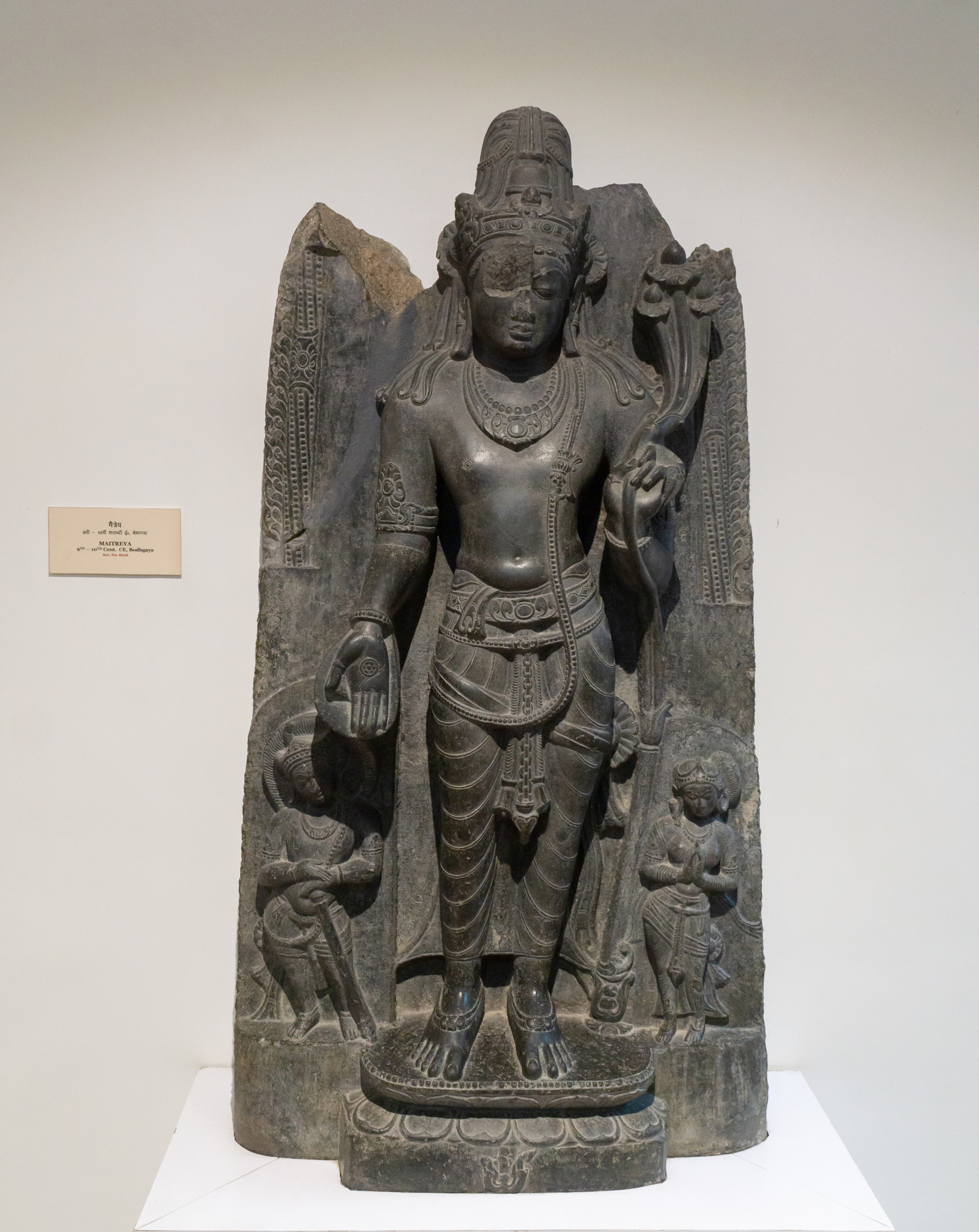
- The Mahabodhi Temple Great Buddha Statue The Bodhi Tree Mountain of Ashrams, Vindhya range Bodh Gayā Maitreya Buddha at ASI Museum

- Location within Bihar Location within India
- Coordinates: 24.6950°N 84.9925°E
- Country: India
- State: Bihar
- District: Gaya

Area (2015) (Note: Constituents of Bodh Gaya Plannina area are Bodh Gaya Nagar Panchayat, 32 villages in Bodh Gaya CD block and 3 villages in Gaya CD block of Gaya district.)
  - City: 20.2 km^{2} (7.8 sq mi)
  - Regional planning: 83.78 km^{2} (32.35 sq mi)

Population (2018)
  - Total: 48,184

Languages
  - Official: Hindi
- Time zone: UTC+5:30 (IST)
- PIN: 824231
- Vehicle registration: BR-02

Translations of Bodh Gayā
- Sanskrit: बोधगया (IAST: Bodhagayā)
- Pali: बोधगया, Classical: उरुवेला (Bodhagayā, Classical: Uruvelā)
- Bengali: বুদ্ধ গয়া
- Burmese: ဗုဒ္ဓဂါယာ
- Chinese: 菩提伽耶 (Pinyin: Pútíjiāyé)
- Indonesian: Bodh Gaya
- Japanese: ブッダガヤ/仏陀伽耶 (Rōmaji: Buddagaya)
- Khmer: ពុទ្ធគយា (UNGEGN: Bŭdh Geăyéa)
- Korean: 부다가야 (RR: Budagaya)
- Mon: ဗုဒ္ဓဂါယာ
- Sinhala: බුද්ධගයා
- Tamil: புத்தகயை
- Tibetan: བྱང་ཆུབ་སྙིང་པོ་
- Thai: พุทธคยา / โพธคยา (RTGS: Phutthakhaya / Phothakhaya)
- Vietnamese: Bồ Đề Đạo Tràng

Bodh Gayā is a religious site and place of pilgrimage associated with the Mahabodhi Temple complex, situated in the Gaya district in the Indian state of Bihar. It is famous for being the place where Gautama Buddha is said to have attained enlightenment (Pali: bodhi) under what became known as the Bodhi Tree. Since antiquity, Bodh Gayā has remained the object of pilgrimage and veneration for Buddhists. Archaeological finds, including sculptures, show that the site was in use by Buddhists since the Maurya period.

For Buddhists, Bodh Gayā is the most important of the four main pilgrimage sites related to the life of Gautama Buddha, the other three being Kushinagar, Lumbini, and Sarnath. In 2002, Mahabodhi Temple, located in Bodh Gayā, became a UNESCO World Heritage Site.

== History ==
Bodh Gayā is considered the holiest site in Buddhism. Known as Uruvelā in the Buddha's time, it is by the bank of the Lilājan River. The first temple at the site was built by Maurya Emperor Ashoka.

Traditionally, it is believed that the Buddha was born in 563 BCE on the next Baisakhi purnima (second full moon in calendar years that do not themselves start during full moon) in Lumbini, Nepal. As Siddhartha, he renounced his family at the age of 29 in 534 BCE, and travelled and meditated in search of truth. After practising self-mortification for six years at Uruvela (Buddhagaya) in Gaya, he gave up that practice because it did not give him liberation. Then he discovered the Noble Eightfold Path of his own and practised it, finally reaching enlightenment: complete freedom from lust (Rāga), hatred (Dvesha), and delusion (Mohā), also known as the Three poisons.

At this point, the Buddha was abandoned by the five men who had been his companions in his earlier austerities, as all they saw was an ordinary man; mocking his well-nourished appearance, they said, "Here comes the mendicant Gautama, who has turned away from asceticism. He is certainly not worth our respect." When they reminded him of his former vows, the Buddha replied, "Austerities only confuse the mind. In the exhaustion and mental stupor to which they lead, one can no longer understand the ordinary things of life, still less the truth that lies beyond the senses. I have given up extremes of either luxury or asceticism. I have discovered the Middle Way." This is explained as the path that is neither easy (his former life as a rich prince) nor hard (living in austere conditions, practising self-denial). Hearing this, the five ascetics became the Buddha's first disciples in Deer Park, Sarnath, 13 kilometres (8.1 mi) northeast of Varanasi.

Gautama's disciples began to visit the place during the full moon in the month of Vaisakha (April–May), as per the Hindu calendar. Over time, the place became known as Bodh Gayā, the day of enlightenment as Buddha Purnima, and the tree as the Bodhi Tree.

Bodh Gayā's history is documented by many inscriptions and pilgrimage accounts. Foremost among these are the accounts of the Chinese pilgrims Faxian in the 5th century and Xuanzang in the 7th century. The area was at the heart of a Buddhist civilisation for centuries, until it was conquered by Turkic armies in the 13th century.

From the 11th to 13th centuries, Bodh Gayā was under the control of local chieftains known as the Pithipatis of Magadha. One of their rulers, Acarya Buddhasena, has been recorded as making a grant to Sri Lankan monks near the Mahabodhi temple. In the 12th century, Muslim Turk armies led by Delhi Sultanate's Qutb al-Din Aibak and Bakhtiyar Khilji invaded and destroyed Bodh Gayā and nearby regions.

== Contemporary and historic names ==
The place name Bodh Gayā (also known as Bauddha Gyāh, Bodhgayā, Bodhi Gayā, Bodhīmaṇḍa, Boodh Gayā, Buddha Gayā and Budh Gyā) came into use in the 18th century. Historically, it was known as Uruvela, Dharmāranya, Jayapura, Sambodhī (Saṃ + bodhi, meaning 'Complete Enlightenment' in Ashoka's Major Rock Edict No.8), Vajrāsana (the 'Diamond Throne' of the Buddha), or Mahābodhī ('Great Enlightenment'). Bodh Gayā's main monastery used to be called the Bodhimanda-vihāra (Pali); it is now known as the Mahabodhi Temple.

== Mahabodhi Temple ==
The complex, about 110 kilometres (68 mi) from Patna, at 24°41′43″N 84°59′38″E, contains the Mahabodhi Temple with the Vajrasana or "diamond throne" and the Bodhi tree. This tree was originally a sapling of the Sri Maha Bodhi tree in Sri Lanka, itself grown from a what is claimed to be a sapling of the original Bodhi tree.

In approximately 250 BCE, about 200 years after the Buddha attained Enlightenment, Emperor Asoka visited Bodh Gayā to establish a monastery and shrine there.

Representations of this early temple are found at Sanchi, on the toraṇas of Stūpa I, dating from around 25 BCE, and on a relief carving from the stupa railing at Bhārhut, from the early Shunga period (c. 185 – c. 73 BCE).

== Other Buddhist temples ==
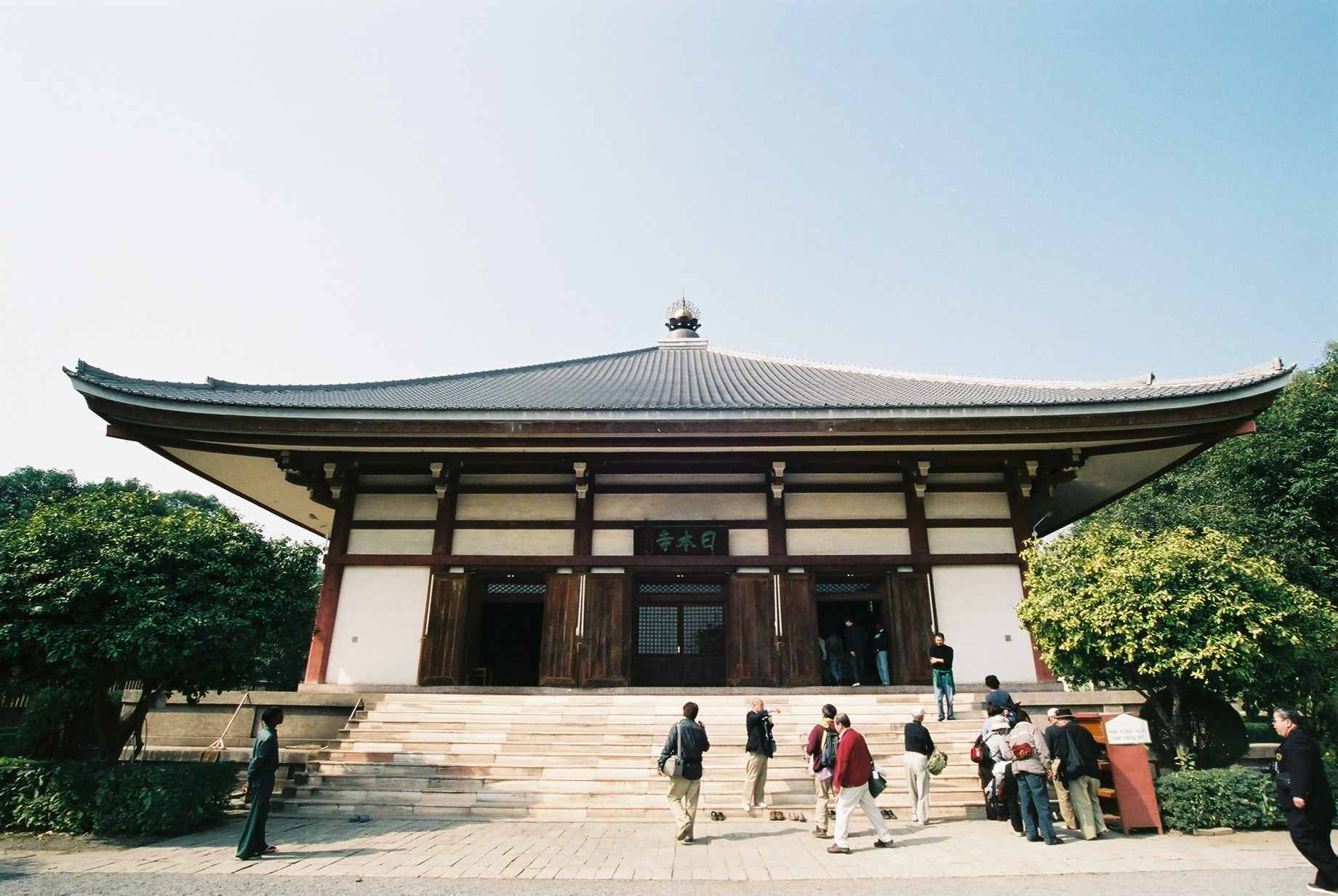
Nipponji Temple

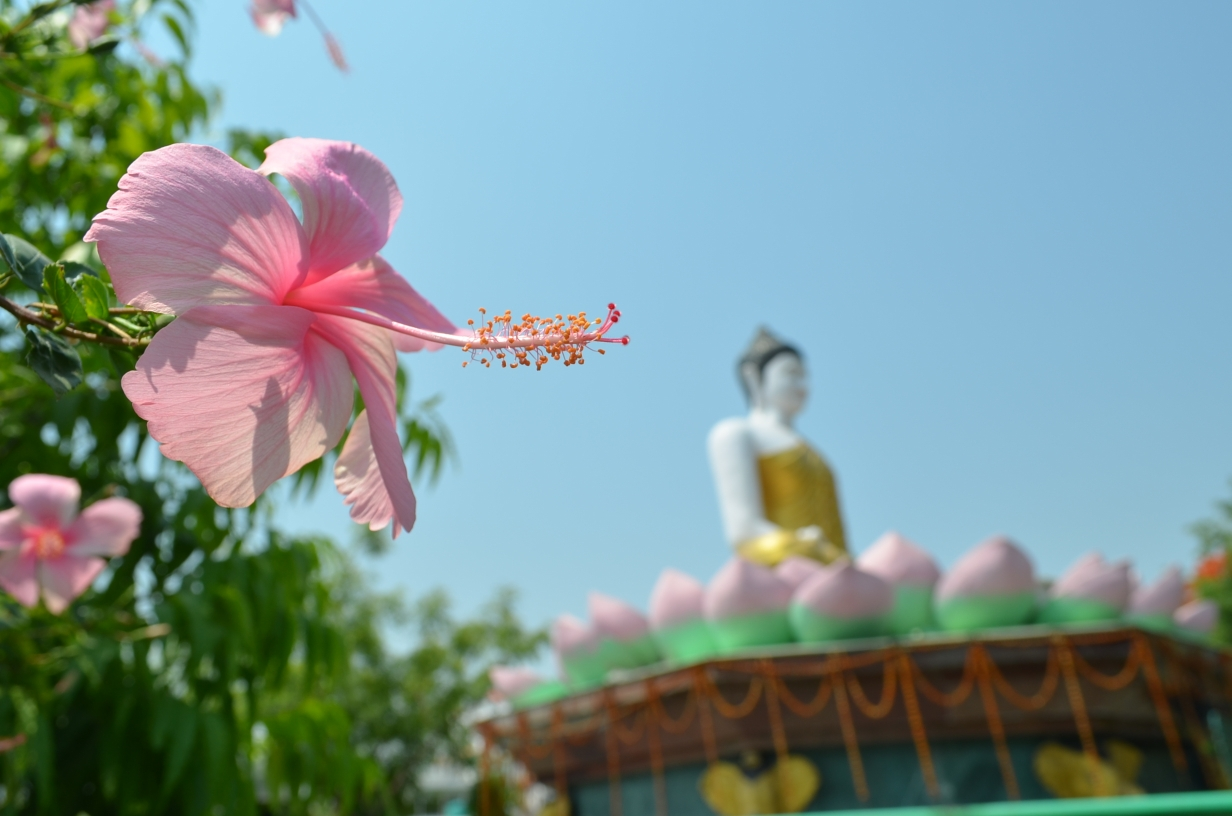
Bangladesh Buddhist Vihara

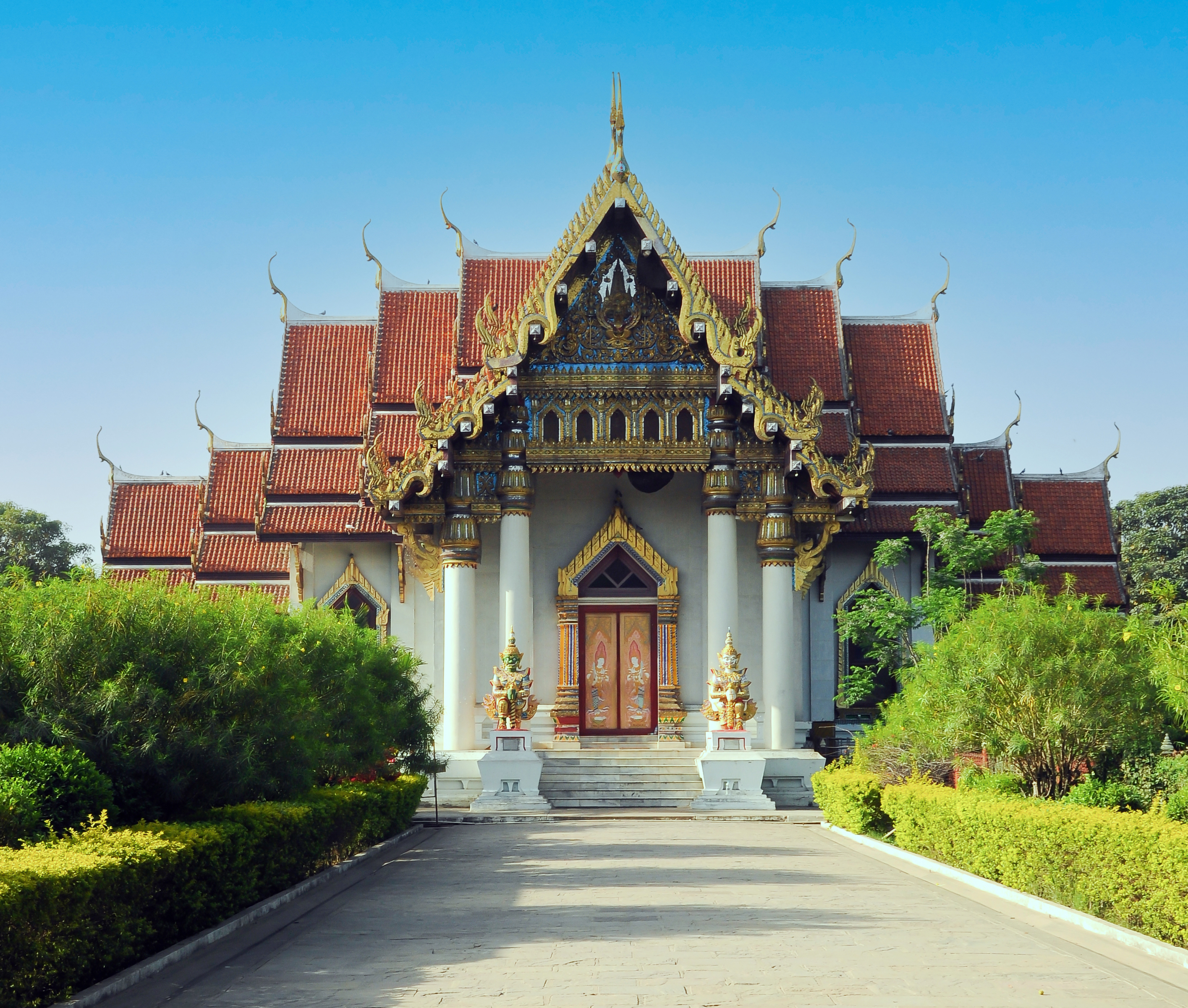
Wat Thai Buddhagaya

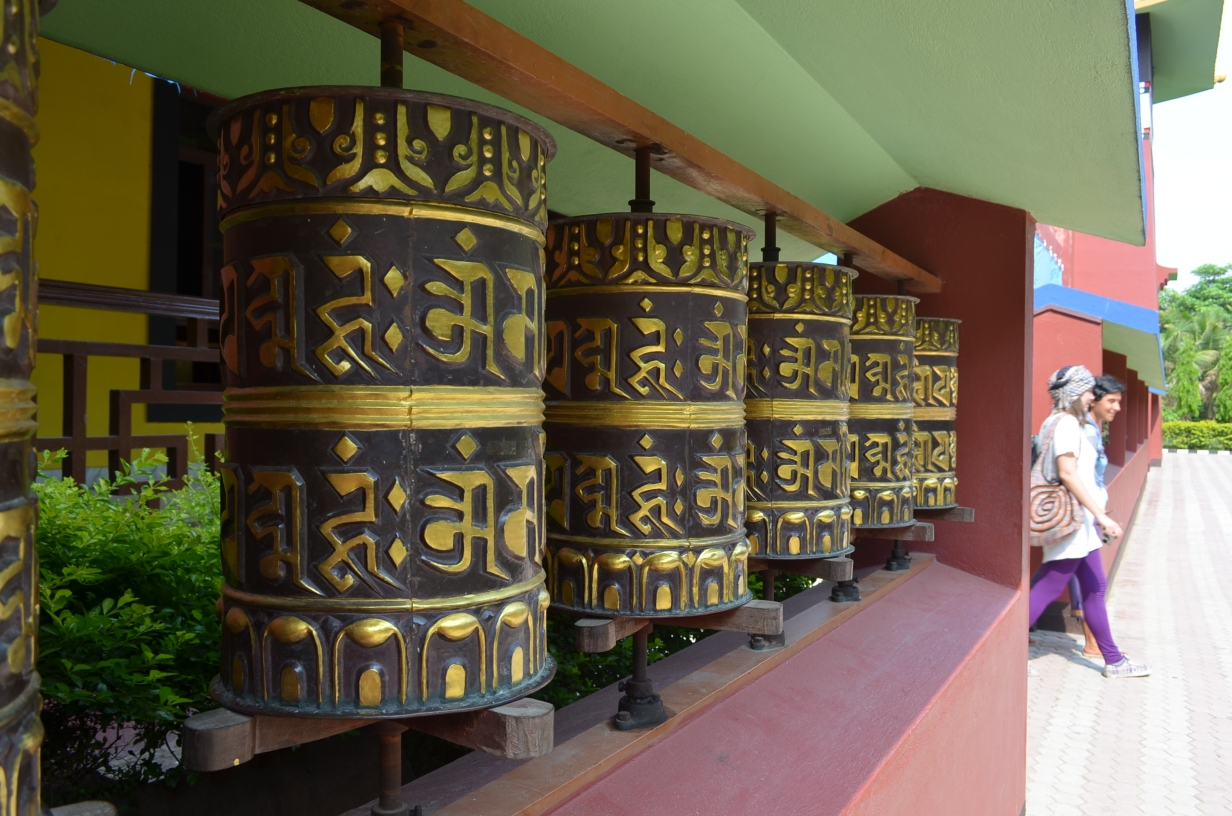
Prayer wheels at Tergar Monastery

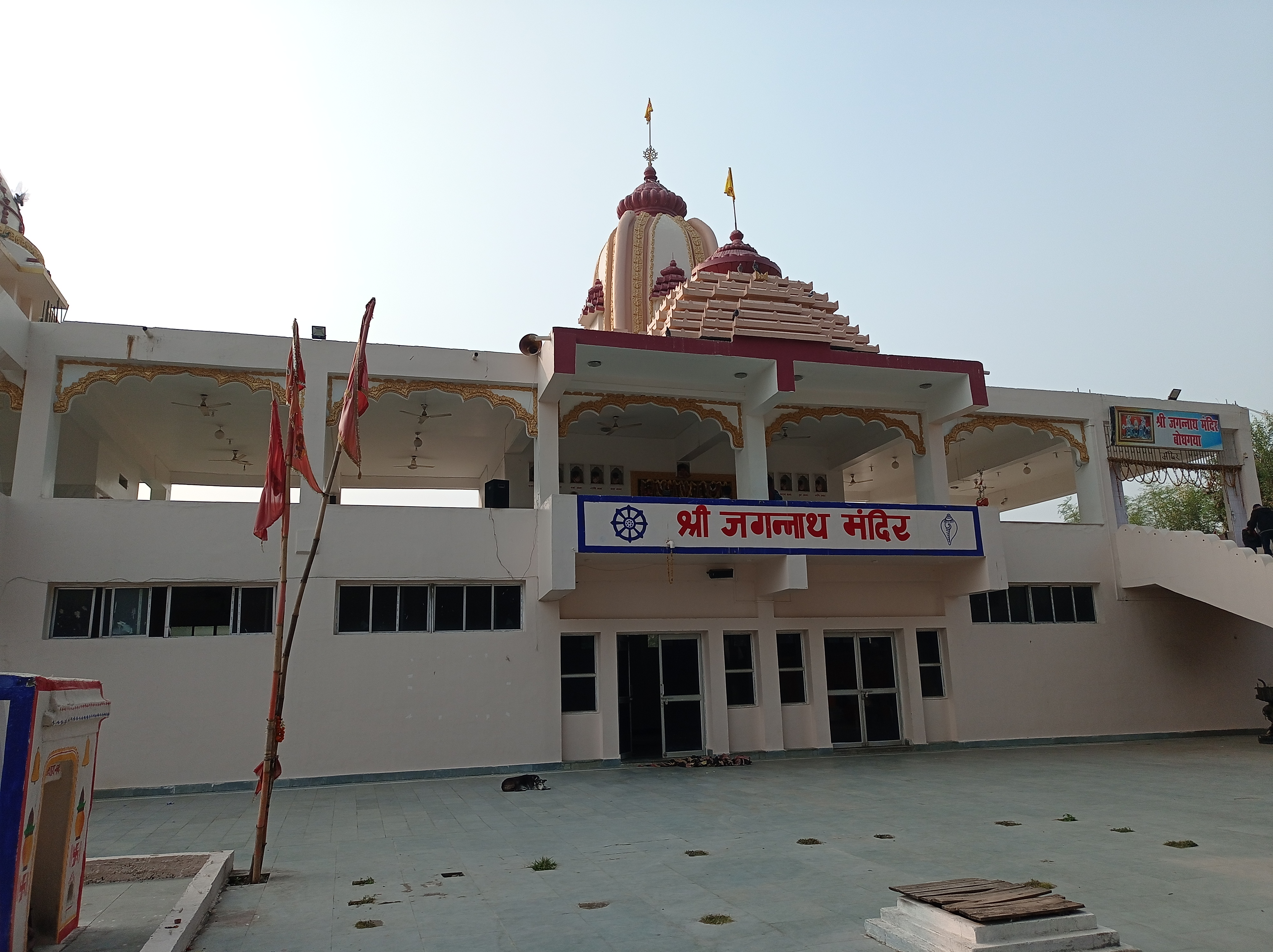
The Hindu Jagannath temple, located near the Mahabodhi Temple

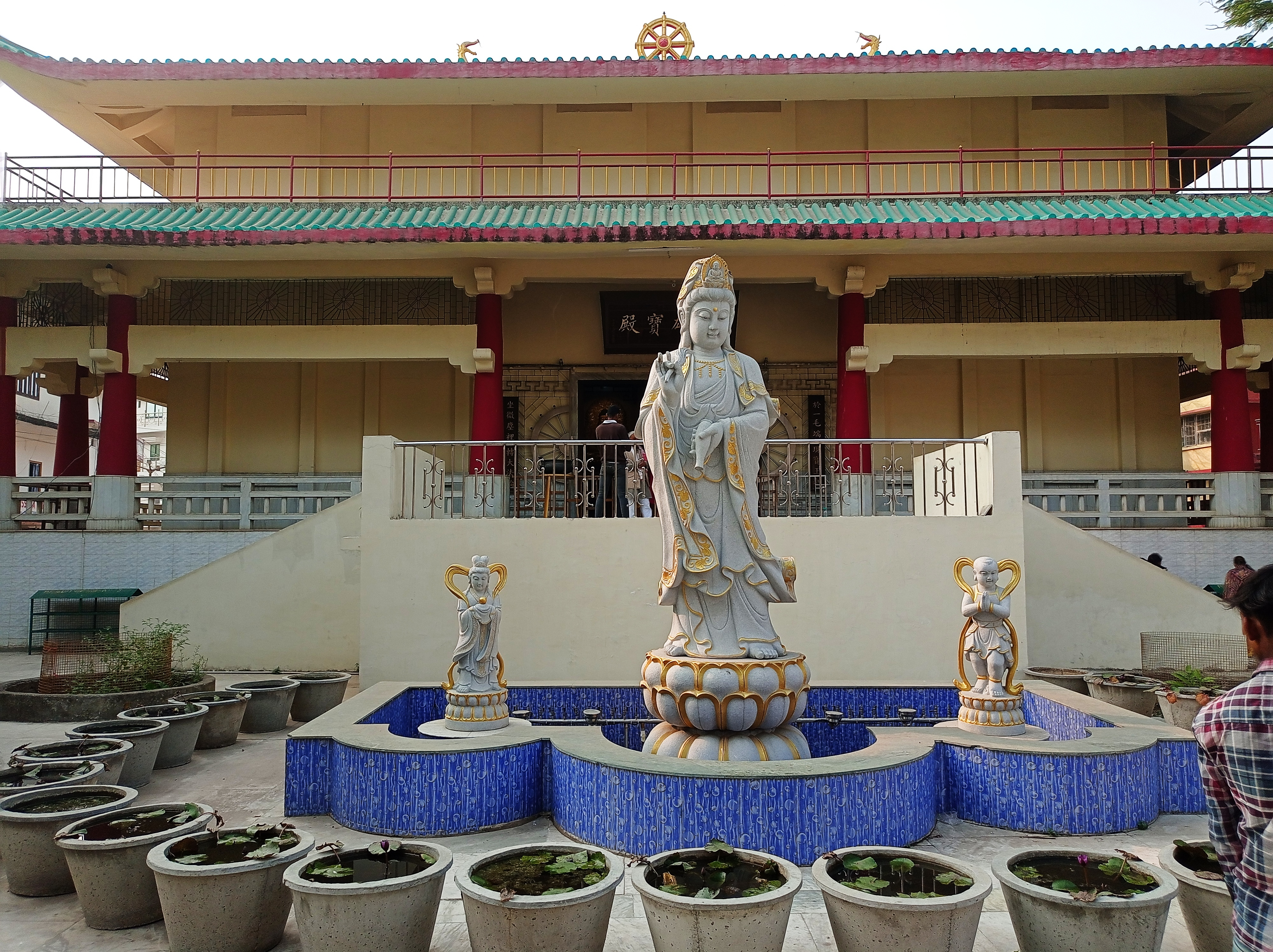
A Budhhist sculpture from the Chinese Temple complex in Bodh Gayā

Kittisirimegha of Sri Lanka, a contemporary of Samudragupta, erected with his permission a Sanghārāma near the Mahabodhi Temple, chiefly for the use of the Singhalese monks who went to worship the Bodhi tree. The circumstances in connection with the Sanghārāma are given by Xuanzang, who describes it as he saw it. It was probably here that Buddhaghosa met the Elder Revata, who persuaded him to come to Ceylon.

Several Buddhist temples and monasteries have been built by the people of Tibet, Mongolia, Nepal, Japan, Korea, Cambodia, Laos, Myanmar, Vietnam, Sikkim, Sri Lanka, Taiwan, Thailand, Bhutan, and China in a wide area around the Mahabodhi Temple. These buildings reflect their respective countries' architectural and decorative styles. The statue of the Buddha in the Chinese temple is 200 years old, and was brought from China. Japan's Nippon temple is shaped like a pagoda. The Myanmar (Burmese) temple is also pagoda-shaped and is reminiscent of Bagan. The Thai temple has a sloping, curved roof covered with golden tiles and contains a massive bronze statue of the Buddha. Next to the Thai temple is a 25-metre (82 ft) statue of the Buddha within a garden that has existed for over 100 years.

=== Sujata Stupa ===
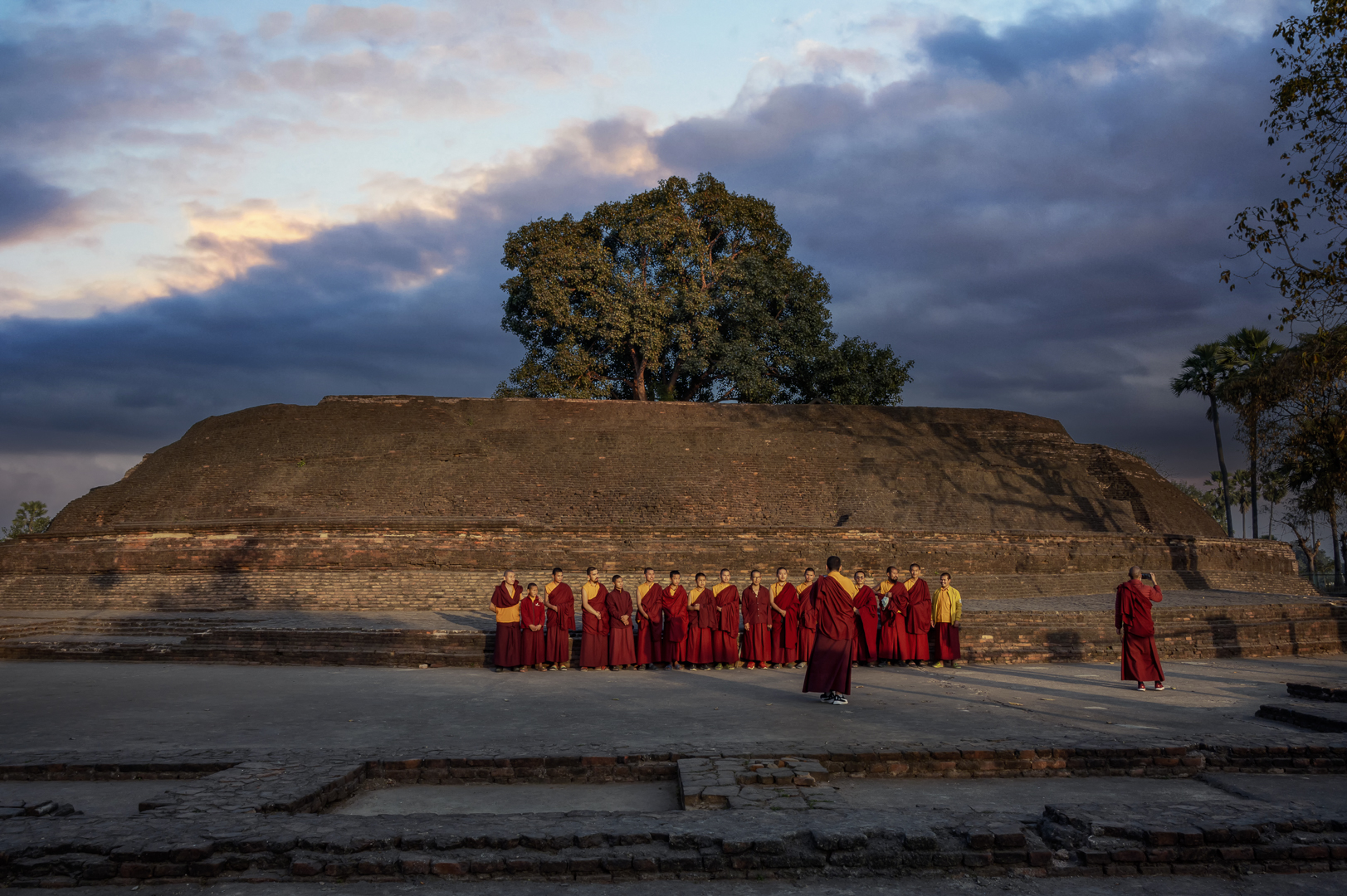
Buddhist monks standing in front of the Sujata Stupa

Across the Phalgu river is the Sujata Stupa, in the village of Bakraur. The stupa was dedicated to the milkmaid Sujata, who is said to have fed the Buddha milk and rice as he was sitting under a Banyan tree, ending his seven years of fasting and asceticism and allowing him to attain illumination through the Middle Way. The stupa was built in the 2nd century BCE, as confirmed by finds of black polished wares and punch-marked coins in the attending monastery.

=== Sujata Temple ===
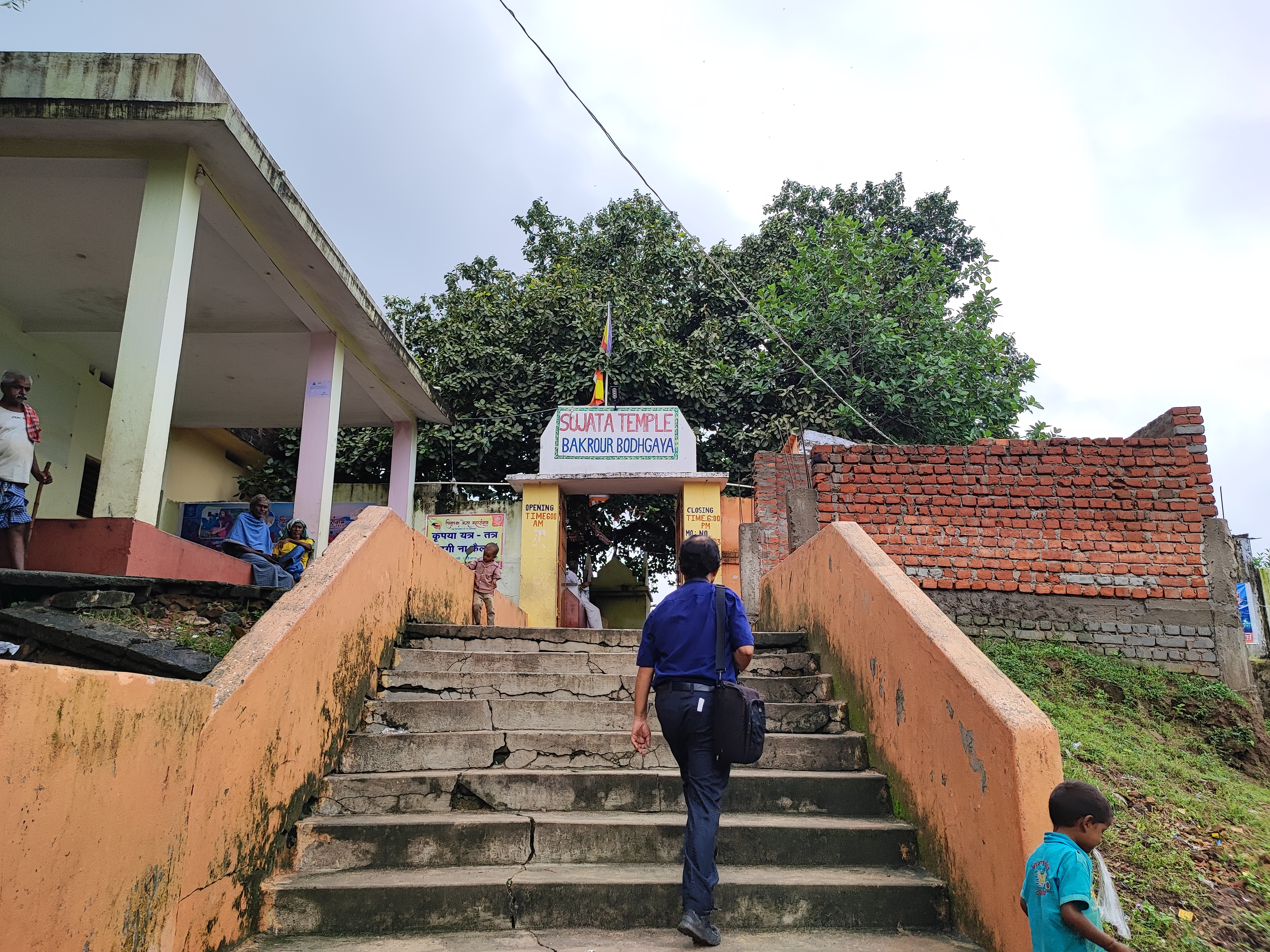
Stairway to Sujata Temple, Bakraur

The Sujata Temple, in Sujata Village in Bakrour, is a significant historical and religious site associated with the life of Siddhartha Gautama, who later became the Buddha. This temple commemorates the pivotal moment when Sujata, a village woman, offered Siddhartha a bowl of rice milk, providing him with nourishment after years of severe asceticism. This is said to have given Siddhartha the strength to pursue the Middle Path, ultimately leading to his enlightenment. The temple stands near the banks of the Niranjana River, symbolising the site where this transformative event took place. The architecturally modest Sujata Temple attracts pilgrims and tourists. The surrounding village and the serene landscape add to the temple's spiritual ambiance, making it a place of contemplation and homage.

== The Great Buddha Statue ==
An 80-foot (24 m) statue of the Buddha, known as The Great Buddha Statue, is in Bodh Gayā. It was unveiled and consecrated on 18 November 1989. The consecration ceremony was attended by the 14th Dalai Lama, who blessed the statue, the first great Buddha ever built in the history of India. Under the slogan "Spread Buddha's rays to the Whole World", Daijokyo spent seven years constructing the statue, mobilising 120,000 masons.

== Mahabodhi Temple bombings ==
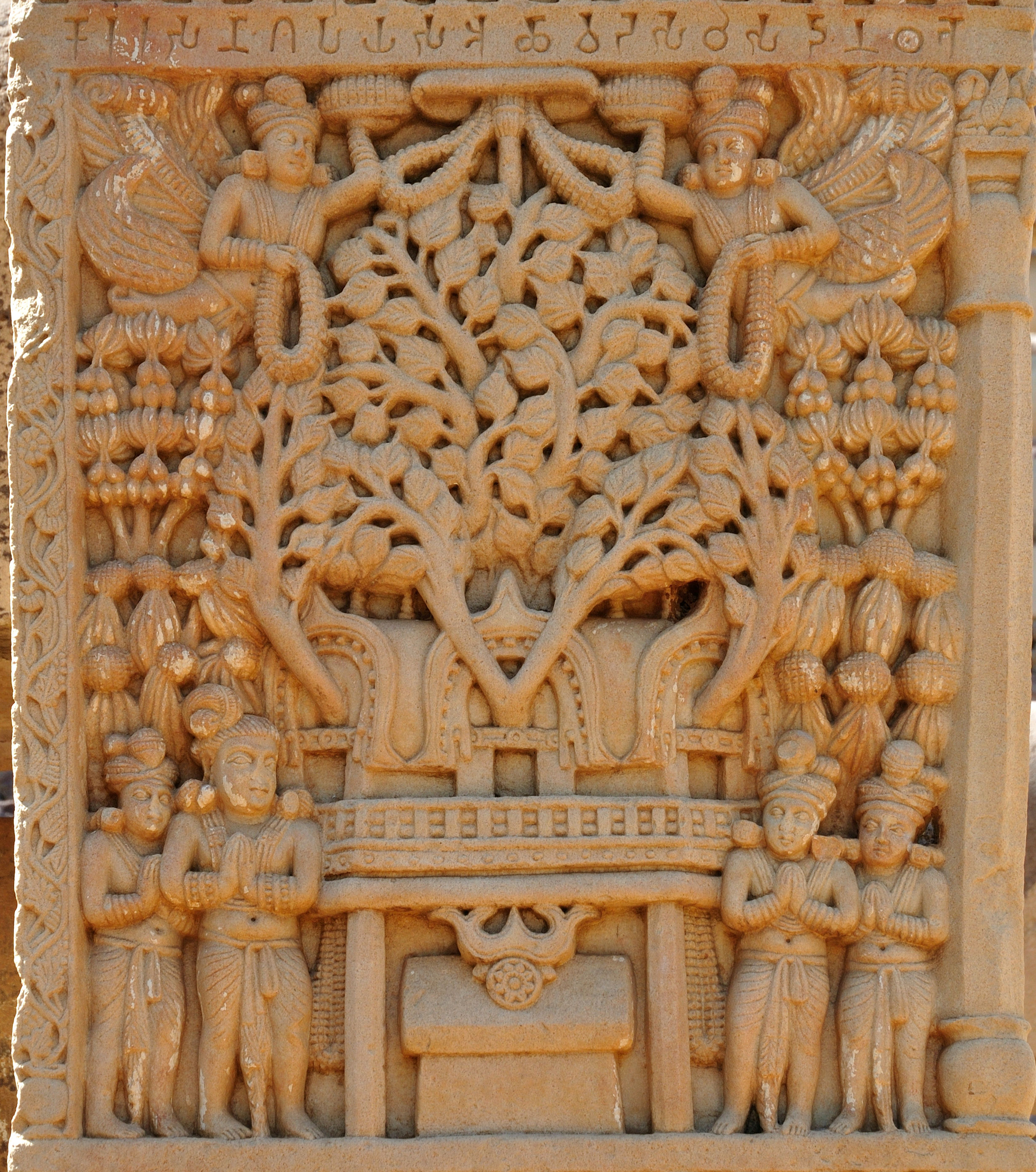
Illustration of the temple built by Asoka at Bodh Gayā around the Bodhi tree. Sculpture of the Satavahana period at Sanchi, 1st century CE.

On 7 July 2013, at around 5:15 a.m., there was a low-intensity bomb blast in the Mahabodhi Temple complex. This was followed by a series of nine low-intensity blasts that injured two monks, one Tibetan and one Burmese. These blasts were carried out by the Islamist terrorist organisation Indian Mujahideen. Police defused two other bombs, one under the Buddha statue and one near Karmapa Temple.

On 1 June 2018, a special National Investigation Agency (NIA) court of Patna sentenced five suspects in the case to life imprisonment.

== Demographics ==
At the 2001 census, Bodh Gaya had a population of 30,883. Males constitute 54% of the population and females 46%. Bodh Gaya has an average literacy rate of 51%, lower than the national average of 59.5%; with male literacy of 63% and female literacy of 38%. 8% of the population is under 6 years of age.

== Transportation ==
Map of Bodh Gaya in relation to other Eight Great Places Buddhist pilgrimage sites and notable nearby cities

- Buses have been introduced by the BSTDC between Patna and Bodh Gaya via Rajgir.
- A special caravan service called Wonder on Wheel, between Patna and Bodh Gaya, has been introduced by the Bihar Tourism Department.
- Gaya Airport is 7 kilometres (4 mi) from Bodh Gaya and about 10 kilometres (6 mi) from Gaya Junction railway station.
- Bodhgaya has restricted the use of auto rickshaws, cars, and buses to make the site more peaceful. A permit is required to use cars or buses, and the only taxi available is an electric rickshaw that is mostly noiseless.

=== Road ===
Bodh Gaya is connected by road with the India–Nepal border through the Birgunj–Raxaul crossing. Travellers from Kathmandu commonly enter India via Raxaul and reach Bodh Gaya through the road network connecting Raxaul, Mehsi, Muzaffarpur, Patna and Gaya. The Government of Bihar and the Government of India identify Bodh Gaya as a major destination on the Buddhist Circuit with road connectivity supported through the national highway network.

== Sister cities ==
Bodh Gaya has one official sister city:

- Nara Prefecture, Japan

== See also ==
- Cetiya
- Bodhgaya inscription of Mahanaman
- Sri Maha Bodhi
- Lumbini
- Sarnath
- Kusinagar
- Rajgir
- Bakraur
- Kurkihar hoard
- Buddhist pilgrimage
- Indian Institute of Management Bodh Gaya

== Bibliography ==
- Kinnard, Jacob N. (1998). When Is The Buddha Not the Buddha? The Hindu/Buddhist Battle over Bodhgayā and Its Buddha Image. Journal of the American Academy of Religion 66 (4), 817–839
- Geary, David; Sayers, Matthew R; Amar, Abhishek Singh (2012). Cross-disciplinary perspectives on a contested Buddhist site: Bodh Gaya jataka. London, New York: Routledge
