= Wat Thai Buddhagaya =

Buddhist monastery in India

- วัดไทยพุทธคยา
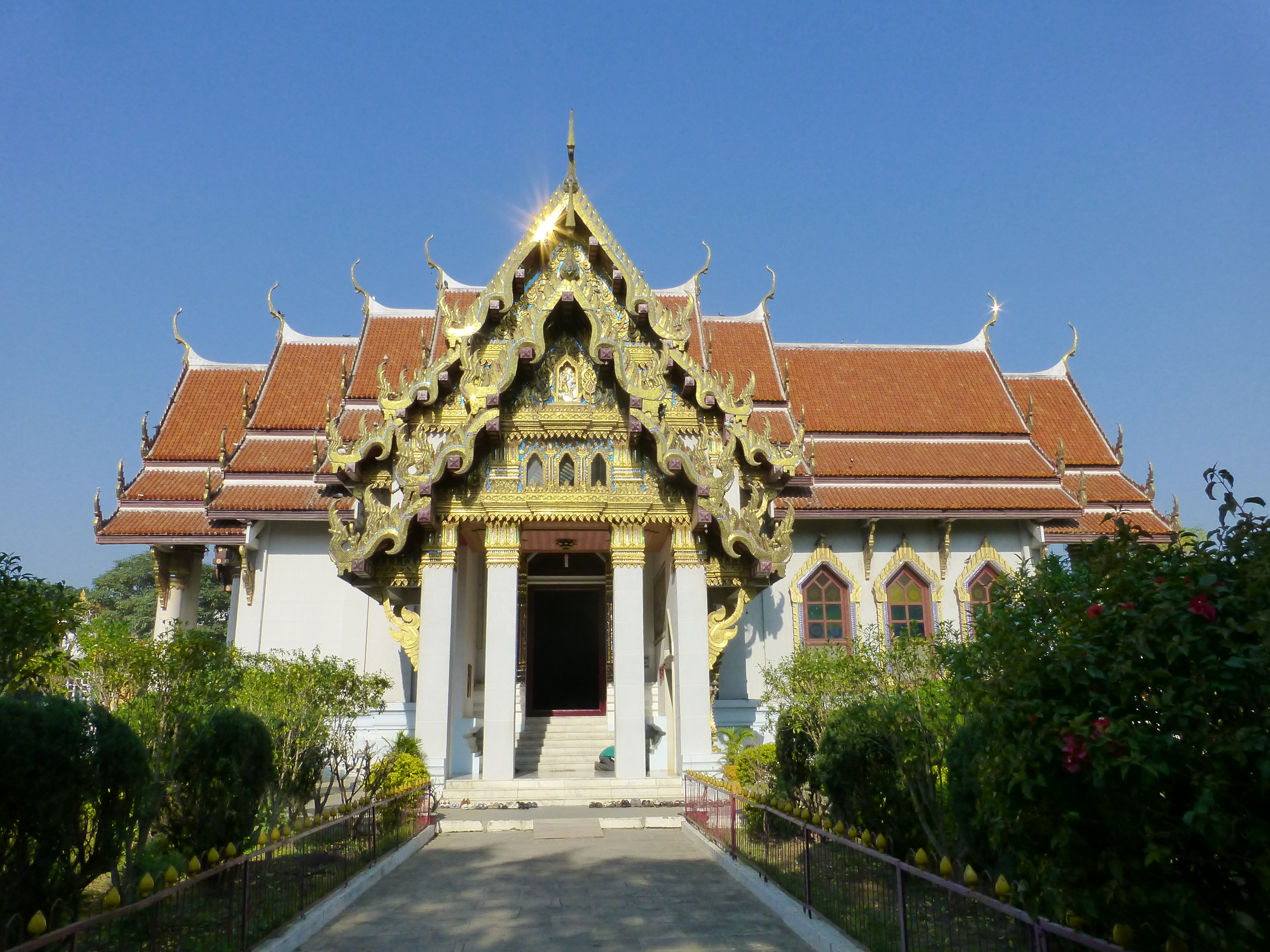
- Wat Thai Buddhagaya in Bodh Gaya

- Location in Bihar, India Wat Thai Buddhagaya (India)

Religion
- Affiliation: Theravada Buddhism

Location
- Location: Bodh Gaya, Gaya, Bihar
- Country: India
- Interactive map of Wat Thai Buddhagaya
- Coordinates: 24°41′38.81″N 84°59′05.99″E

Architecture
- Founder: Government of Thailand
- Completed: 1957

Wat Thai Buddhagaya (Thai: วัดไทยพุทธคยา; also spelled Wat Thai Buddha-Gayā) is a Thai Theravada Buddhist monastery in Bodh Gaya, Bihar, India. It was constructed by the Government of Thailand, at the invitation of the Government of India, as part of the development of foreign monasteries serving Buddhist pilgrimage at Bodh Gaya.

The monastery is also referred to as the Royal Thai Monastery, Bodhgaya. It is one of several monasteries established by Buddhist communities from different countries in the area around the Mahabodhi Temple complex.

== History ==
In the 1950s, India's first Prime Minister Jawaharlal Nehru promoted efforts to revitalise Buddhism in India, alongside the growth of international pilgrimage to Buddhist sacred sites such as Bodh Gaya.

According to Thailand's Ministry of Foreign Affairs, the Royal Thai Monastery, Bodhgaya was established in 1957, by invitation of Nehru, to mark the 25th Buddhist century. Thailand was the first country to build a monastery at Bodh Gaya, and the temple was constructed under a lease agreement between the governments of India and Thailand.

The same Ministry of Foreign Affairs account states that construction was carried out during the tenure of Phra Bahiddha-Nukara, then Thailand's ambassador to India.

== Architecture ==
Wat Thai Buddhagaya is built in a Thai temple style. The monastery acquired its present form in the 1970s, and its appearance was remodelled on Wat Benchamabophit (the "Marble Temple") in Bangkok.

The building has an outer shell of stainless steel with decorative mirror mosaics and a wooden main floor, with a marble-floored meditation room beneath the main structure; the temple is decorated with handmade sculptures made from a mixture of white cement, clay and epoxy, and the site includes Thai-style roofs, gardens, and a Buddha statue.

== Royal and state associations ==
Wat Thai Buddhagaya is sometimes referred to in Thai diplomatic communications as the Royal Thai Monastery, Bodhgaya. Thai government agencies and diplomatic missions have organised religious and cultural activities in cooperation with the monastery in connection with anniversaries of the Thai monarchy.

Thailand's Ministry of Foreign Affairs conducts an annual programme to present Royal Kathina robes at Buddhist temples overseas, including ceremonies held in Bodh Gaya in cooperation with Wat Thai Buddhagaya. According to reports by the ministry, ceremonies in Gaya are conducted by Thai diplomatic missions in India, with the abbot of Wat Thai Buddhagaya playing a leading role in the presentation of the robes.

== Gallery ==
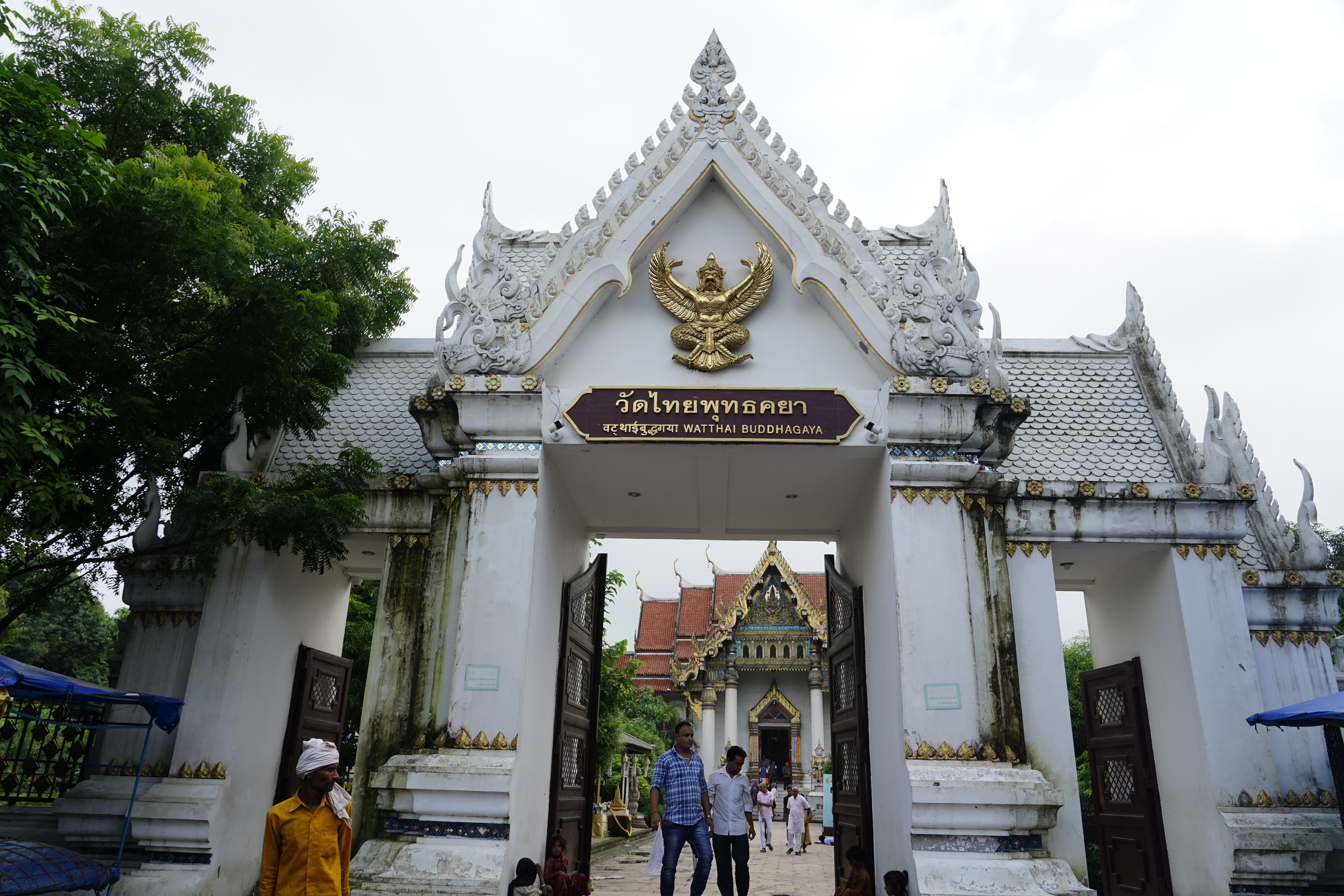
Entrance gate of Wat Thai Buddhagaya

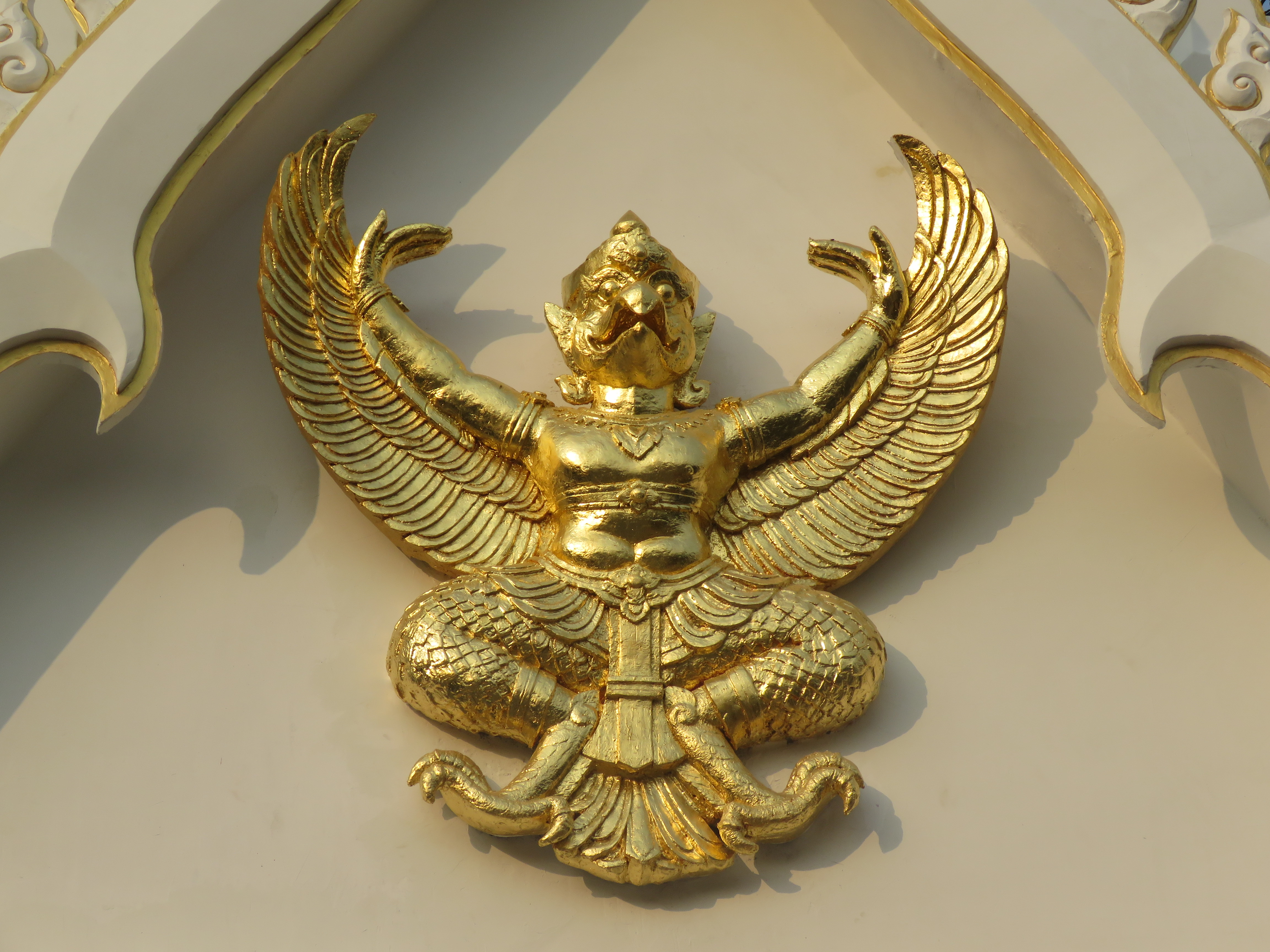
Garuda emblem displayed above the entrance gate

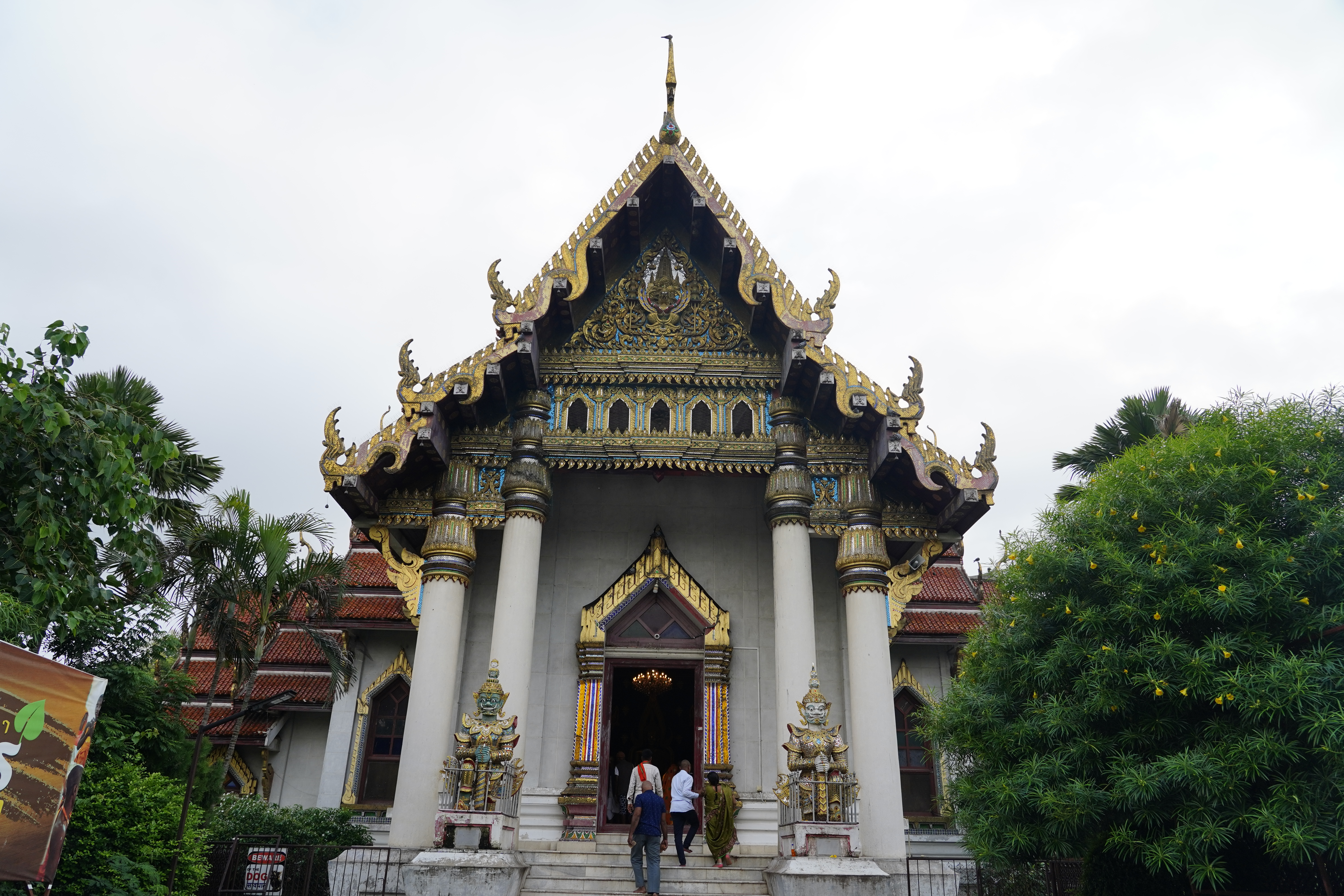
Facade of the main hall

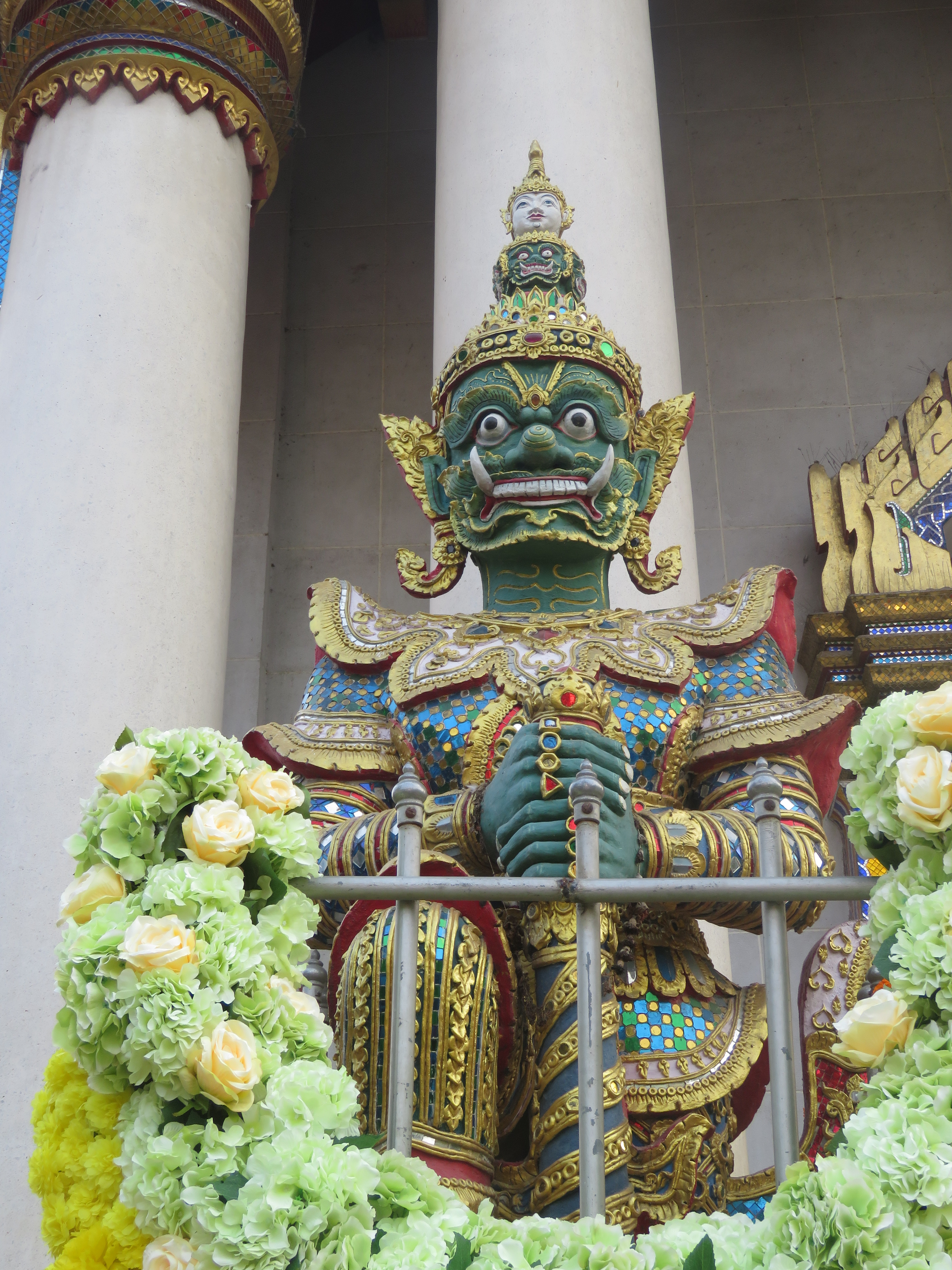
Guardian figure (yaksha) at the entrance of the main hall

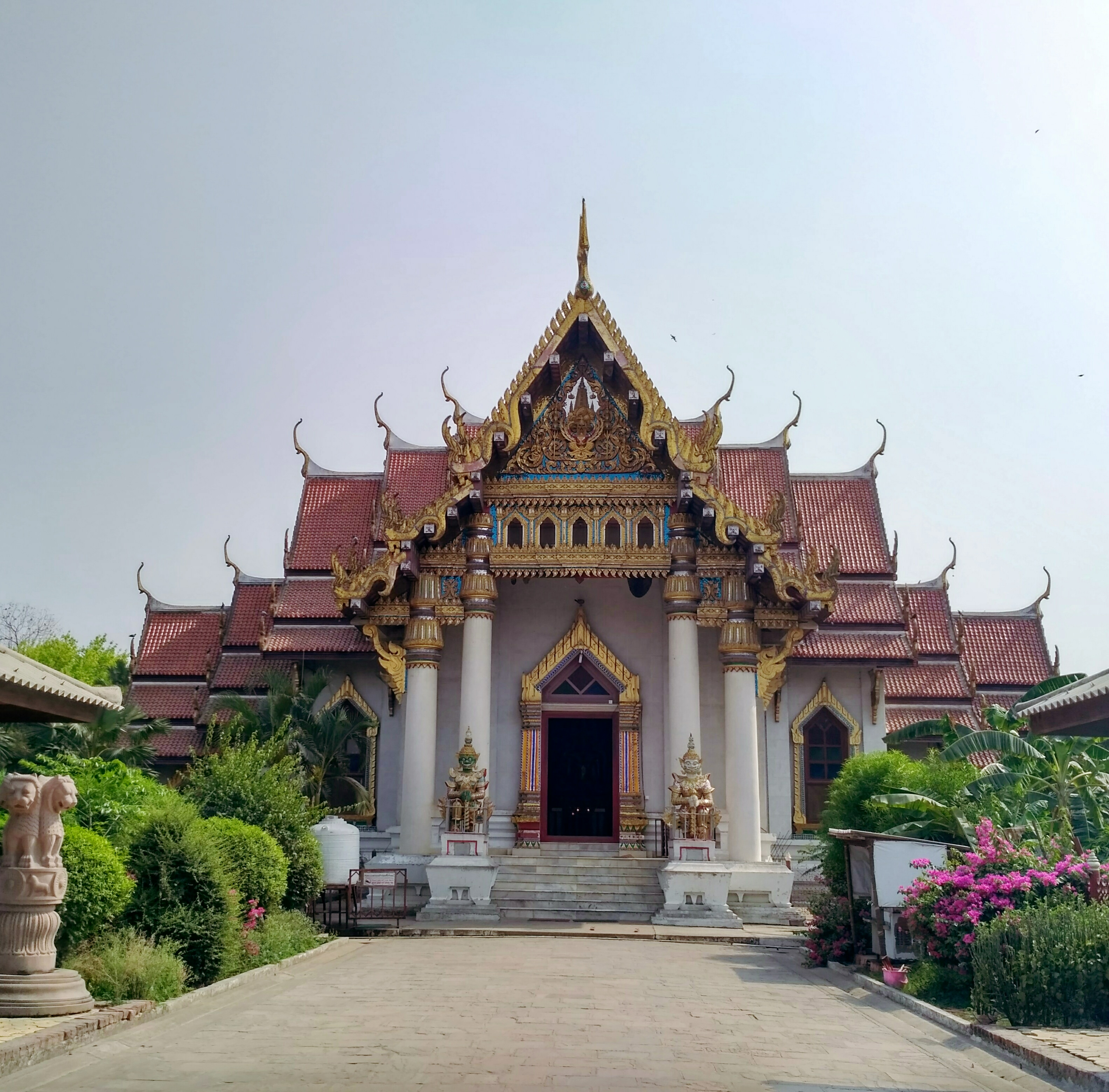

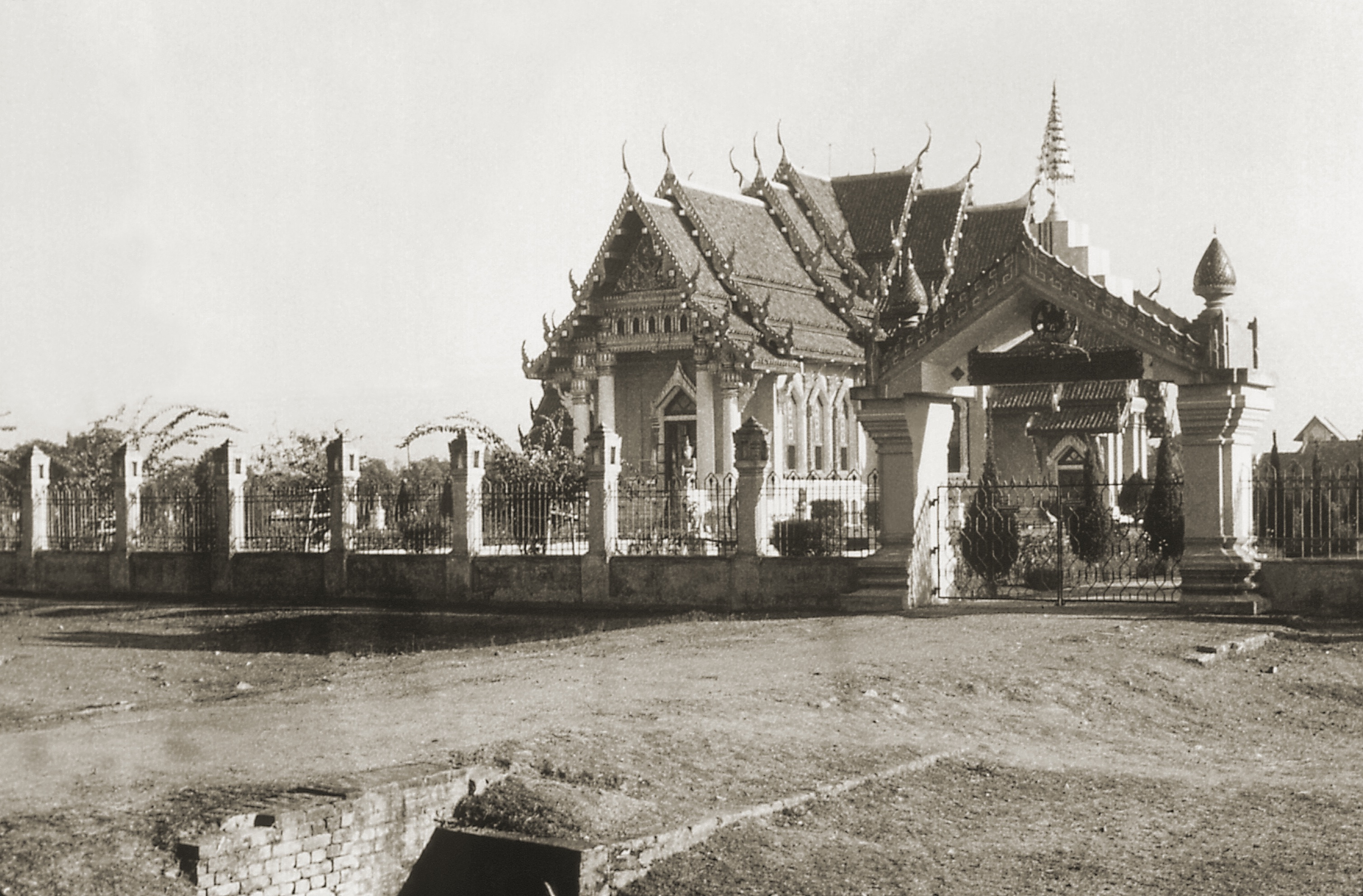
Exterior view of the main temple (1975)

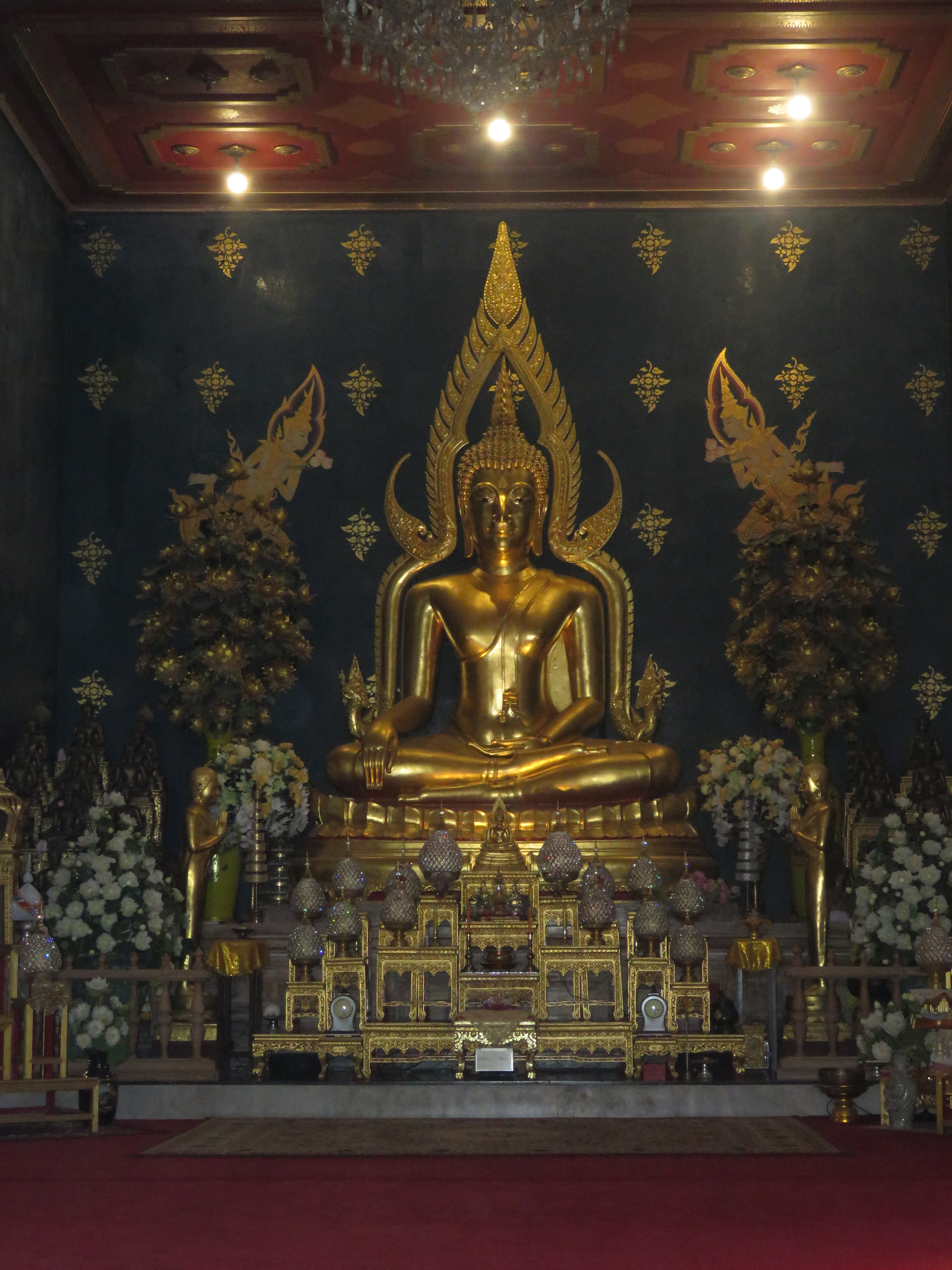
Main Buddha statue at Wat Thai Buddhagaya

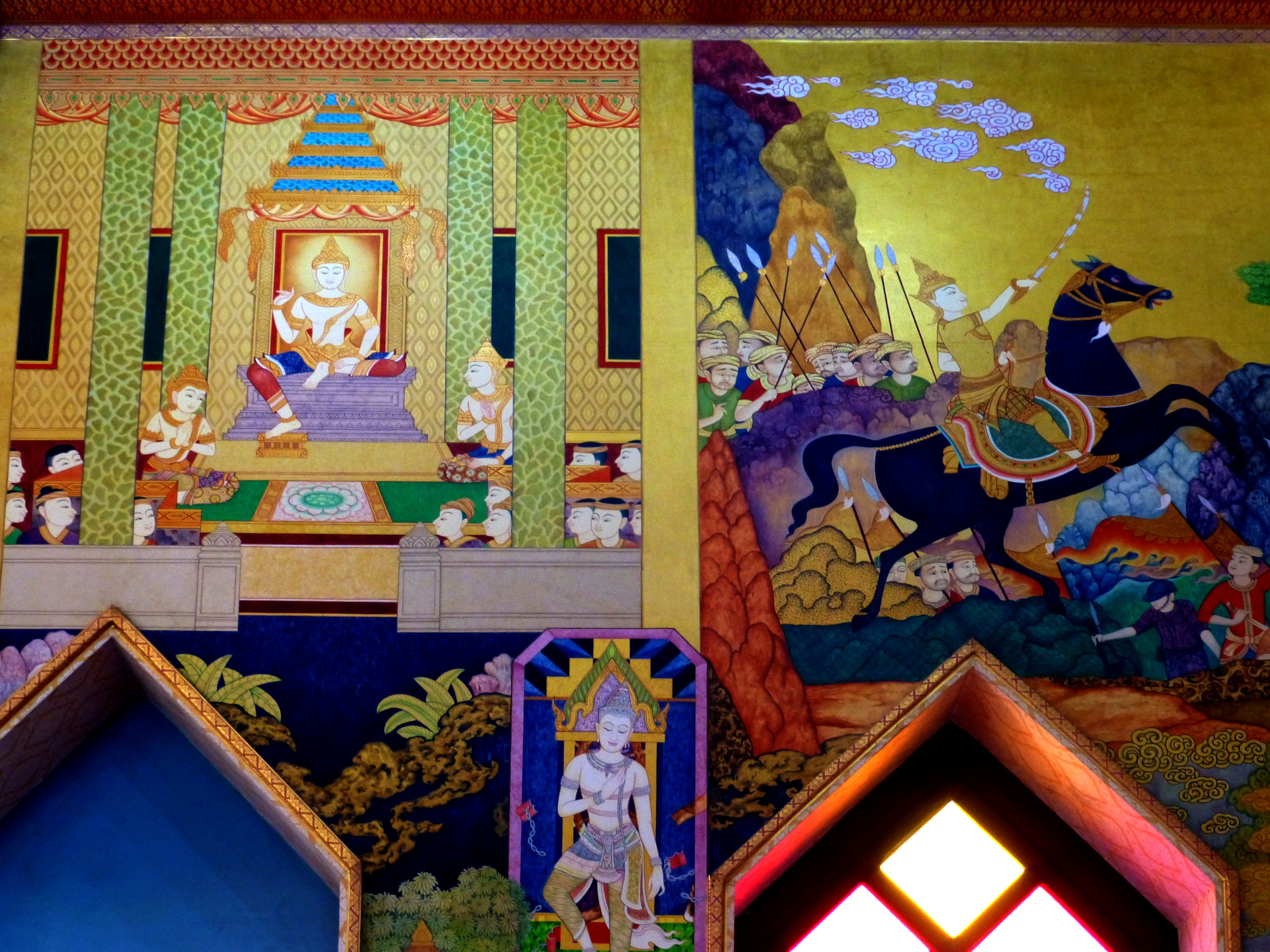
Mural of King Bhumibol Adulyadej's the Story of Mahajanaka, painted by Panya Vijinthanasarn.

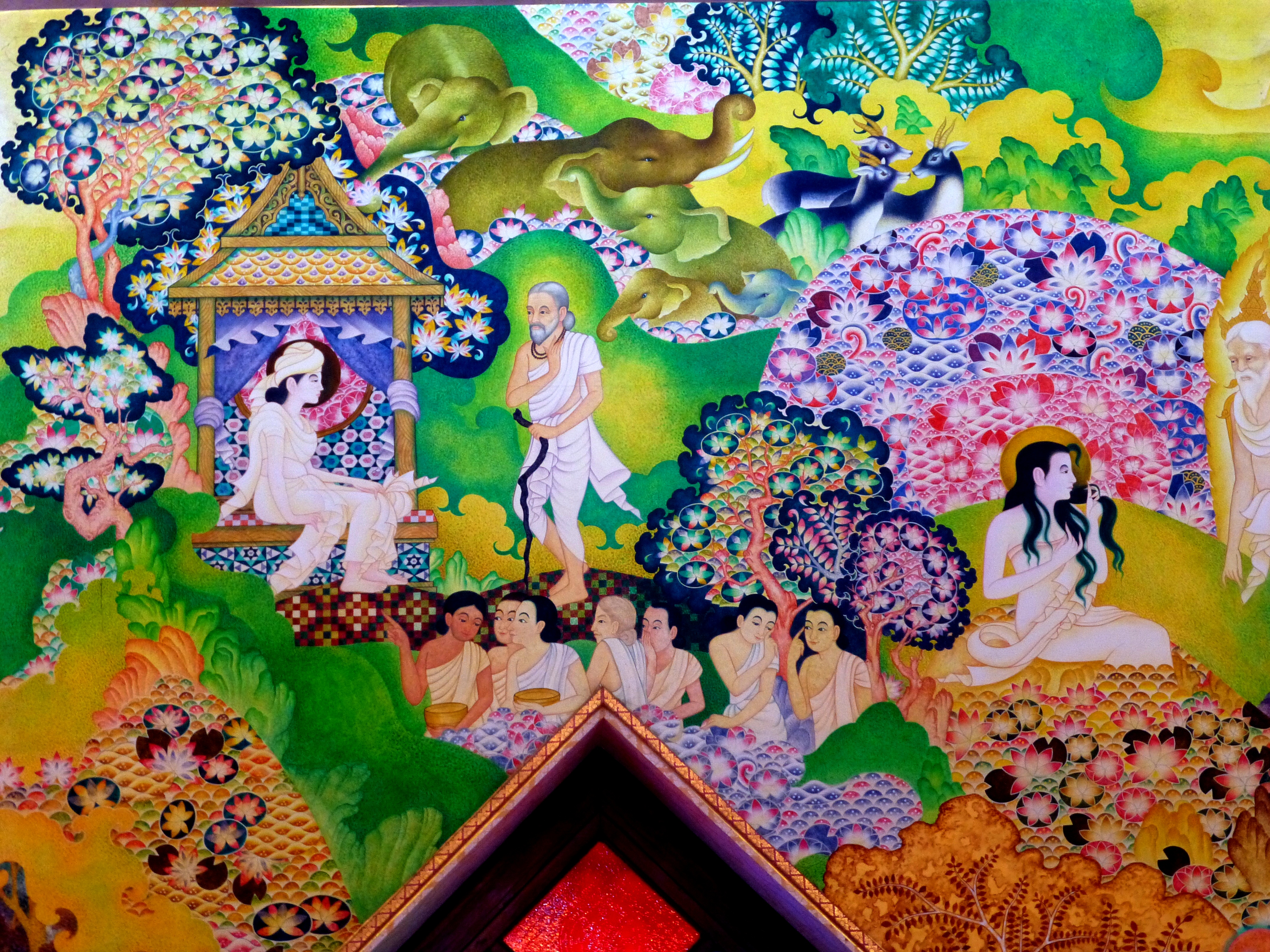
Mural of King Bhumibol Adulyadej's the Story of Mahajanaka, painted by Netikon Chin-yo.

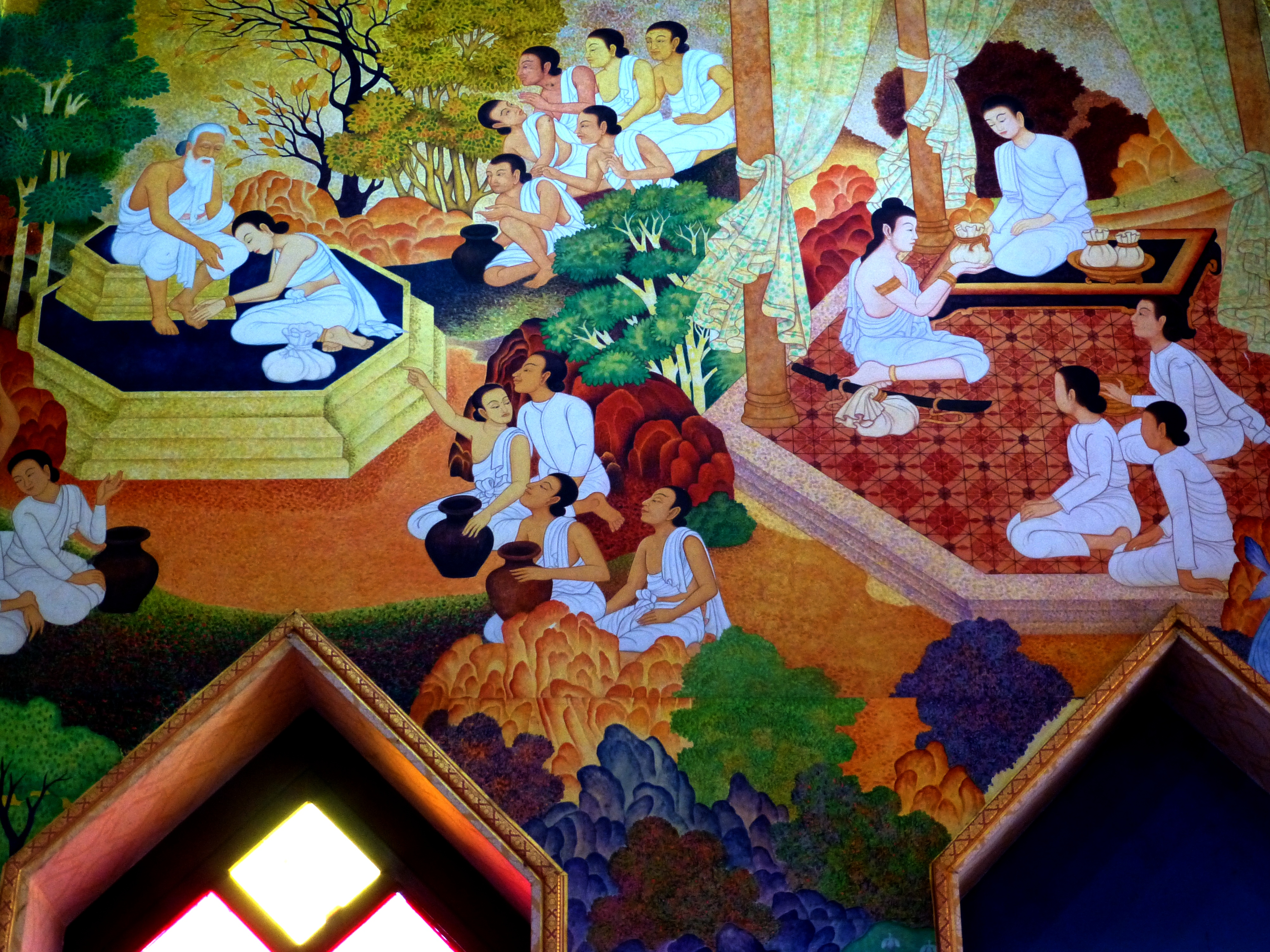
Mural of King Bhumibol Adulyadej's the Story of Mahajanaka, painted by Chintana Piamsiri.

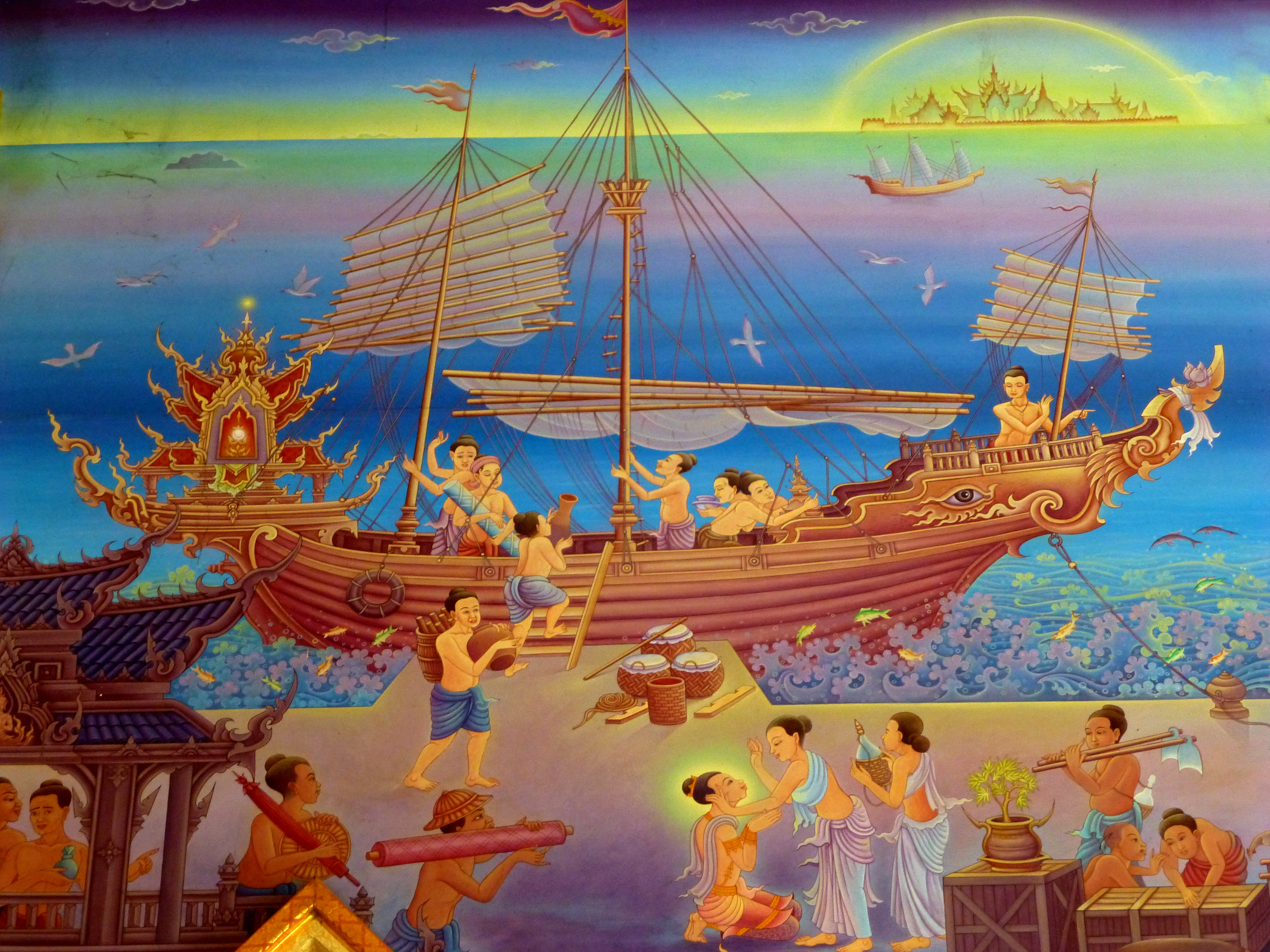
Mural of King Bhumibol Adulyadej's the Story of Mahajanaka, painted by Chalermchai Kositpipat.

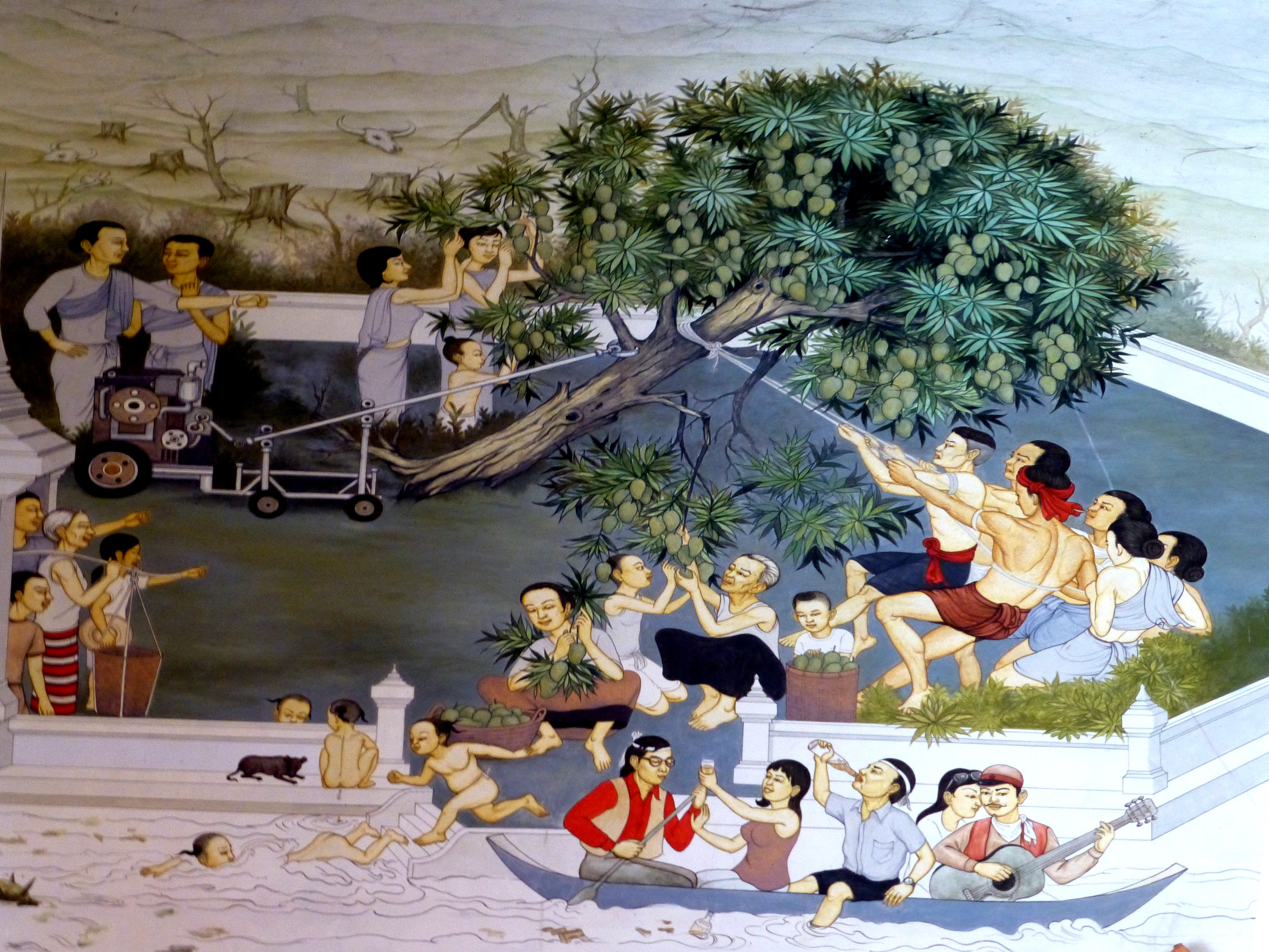
Mural of King Bhumibol Adulyadej's the Story of Mahajanaka, painted by Preecha Thaothong.
