= Archaeological Museum of Bodhgaya =

Archaeology museum in Bodhgaya, Bihar, India

Archaeological Museum, Bodhgaya
- Museum's entrance, August 2022
- Established: December 27, 1956; 69 years ago
- Location: Bodhgaya, Bihar, India
- Coordinates: 24°41′41″N 84°59′14″E
- Type: Archaeology museum
- Accreditation: Archaeological Survey of India
- Curator: Shanker Sharma

Archaeological Museum of Bodhgaya is a museum of archaeology in Bodhgaya, Bihar, India, located near the Mahabodhi Temple complex. Established by the Archaeological Survey of India in 1956, it features several sculptures, artifacts and antiquities pertaining to Buddhism and Hinduism from 2nd century BC to 11th century CE, including some objects and coins from Mauryan, Gupta and Mughal periods.

== Overview ==
Sandstone pillars, August 2022

The Archaeological Museum of Bodhgaya was inaugurated by the 14th Dalai Lama Tenzin Gyatso on 27 December 1956. The museum has three main galleries, along with the portico and corridor. There are some precisely carved pieces of sandstone and granite that include the museum's list of extraordinary collections. The images of Buddha, Maitreya, Manjusri, Avalokitesvara, Tara, Jambhala are showcased as some of the finest sculptures of Buddhist affiliation, whereas the historical Vedic art depicts incarnation scenes of Hindu gods like Vishnu and images of Ganesha, Uma Maheshwara, Kamadeva, Saptamatrika.

The portico contains a large colossal stone image of Lord Buddha standing in abhay mudra position engraved in a black slab. Storytelling stone railings carved in sandstone and granite belonging to the main Mahabodhi Temple complex can be seen by the visitors upon entering the museum gallery on the left. The sandstone railings can be dated back to 2nd century BCE from the Sunga period, while the granite railings are of 6th to 7th century CE.

=== Gallery No. 1 ===
The first gallery features some masterpiece images of Buddhist art that are displayed on pedestals, among which are the images of Lord Buddha in bhumisparsa, abhaya, dharmachakrapravartana and dhayana mudra positions. There are also some artifacts from the pre-historic to Pala period unearthed from excavations at Taradih and Sujatagarh (Bakraur) sites alongside miscellaneous objects including terracotta figures, beads and miniature pot, copper, iron, etc.

=== Gallery No. 2 ===
It showcases comparatively smaller images of both Buddhist and Brahmanical faiths. These include images of Pala-era Buddha, Tara, Nairotma, Avalokiteshvara, Jambhala, Uma-Maheshvara as well as incarnations of Vishnu, Navagrah, Dasavatara and Dikpala panels.
