= Sujata Stupa =

Buddhist stupa in Bihar, India

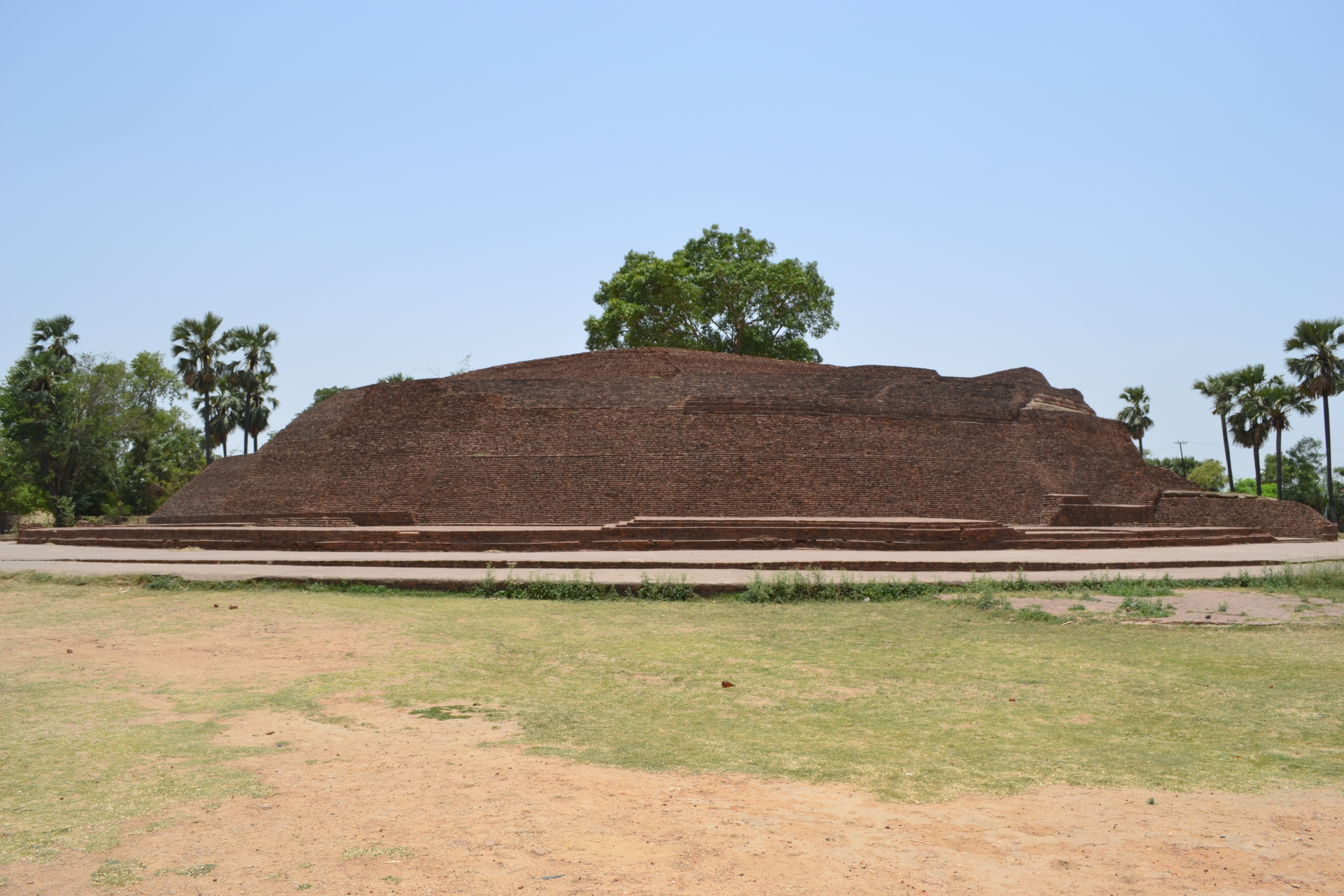
- General view of Sujata Stupa today.

- Location within India Location within Bihar

Religion
- Affiliation: Buddhism
- Ecclesiastical or organizational status: Stupa ruins
- Year consecrated: 2nd century BCE

Location
- Location: Bakraur, Bodh Gaya, India
- State: Bihar
- Interactive map of Sujata Stupa
- Sector: Gaya
- Coordinates: 24.6976432°N 85.0044857°E

Sujata Stupa, also Sujata Kuti stupa or Sujata Garh, is a Buddhist stupa located in the village of Senanigrama (Bakraur) slightly east of Bodh Gaya in the state of Bihar, India. It lies directly across the Phalgu River from the town of Bodh Gaya, where Gautama Buddha is said to have attained enlightenment. It is a walk of about 20 minutes, from Bodh Gaya to Sujata Stupa. It was initially built in the 2nd century BCE as confirmed by finds of Dark Grey polished wares and a punch-marked coin in the monastery nearby.

The stupa was dedicated to the milkmaid Sujata, from the village of Bakraur, who is said to have fed Gautama Buddha milk and rice at this spot as he was sitting under a Banyan tree, thereby ending his seven years of fasting and asceticism, and allowing him to attain illumination through the Middle Way.

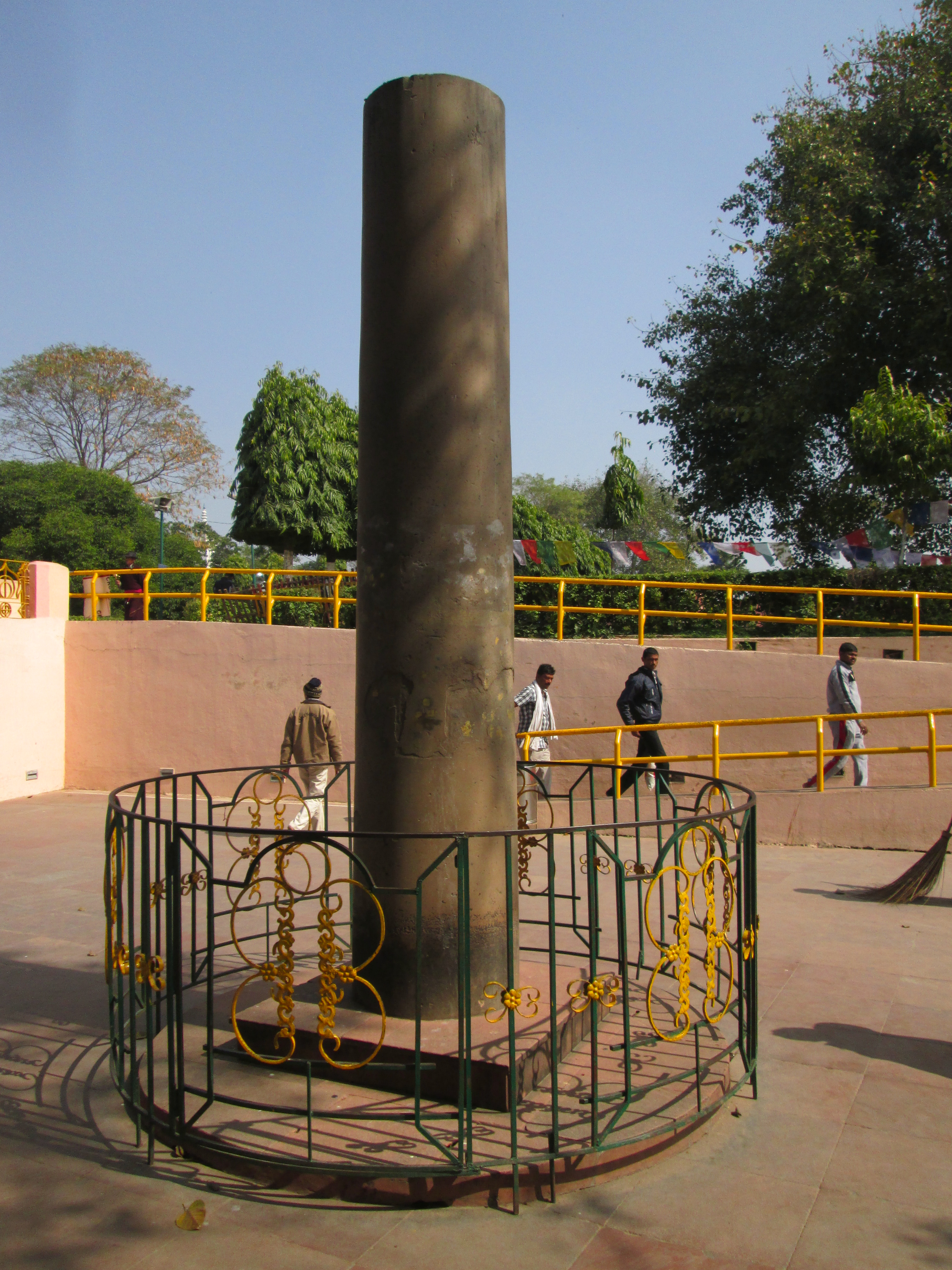
Pillar of Ashoka, originally located in front of Sujata Stupa, was brought to Bodh Gaya in 1956.

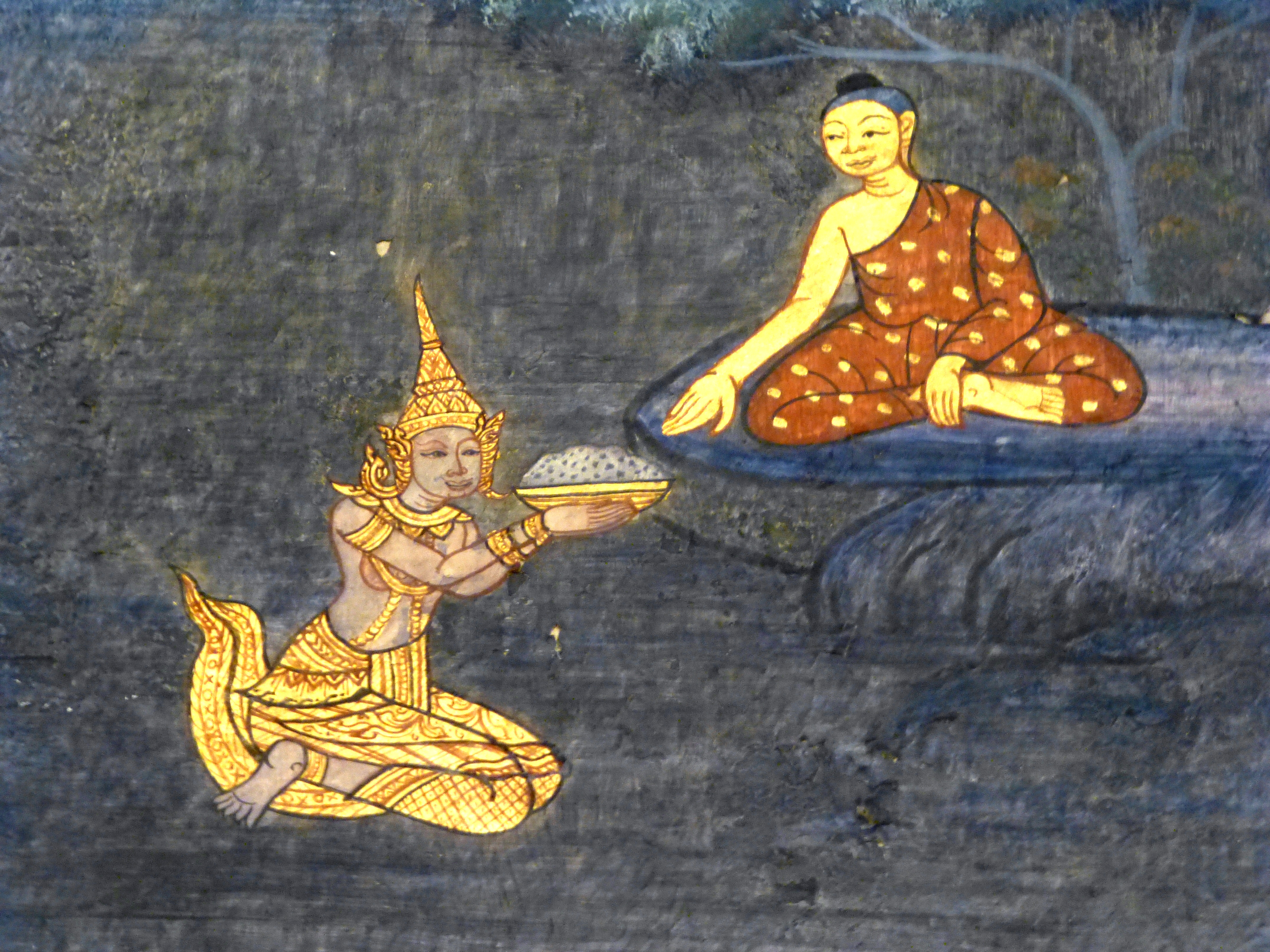
Sujata offers Milk-Rice to the Buddha (art of Ayutthaya).

The stupa was originally adorned with a pillar of Ashoka, which was quarried in part for building material in the 1800s, then placed at the Gol Pather intersection of Gaya, and finally moved to Bodh Gaya in 1956.

The stupa was an integral part of the original landscape at Bodh Gaya, and it was reinforced and enlarged several times over the centuries.

The Archaeological Survey of India made excavations in 1973-74 and 2001-06. A plaque found in the excavation has an inscription from the 8th-9th century CE that reads "Devapala Rajasya Sujata Griha", Devapala being interpreted as the 9th century Pala dynasty king, hence meaning "Sujata House, of King Devapala". This suggests that the last phase of construction of the stupa dates to Devapala in the 9th century CE, to commemorate the house where Sujata lived.

Before the discovery of this inscription, it was thought that this stupa had been dedicated to "Gandha-hasti", the "Perfumed elephant", and was therefore named "Gandha-hasti stupa". This interpretation was based on a description made by the 7th-century Chinese pilgrim Hiuen Tsiang (in 大唐西域記: Buddhist Records of the Western World) who recounted that when he crossed the river (Niranjana) and went to Bakraur, he encountered a stupa and a stone column at the place where Gandha-hasti used to dwell (referring to the place where the Buddha, in a previous life, was reborn as the offspring of a Perfumed elephant).
