= Lilajan River =

Nilanjan, Niranjana or Falgu River Flowing Through Bodh Gaya and Gaya

Lilājan River Niranjana River

Location
- Country: India
- State: Jharkhand and Bihar
- Cities: Jori, Hunterganj, Bodh Gaya

Physical characteristics
- Source: Simaria
  - location: Chatra district
- Mouth: Falgu River
  - location: Gaya district
  - coordinates: 24°43′41″N 85°00′47″E

The Lilājan River (also known by its Sanskrit name: Nirañjanā) is a river that flows through the Chatra and Gaya districts in the Indian states of Jharkhand and Bihar. It is also referred to as the Nilanjan, Niranjana or Falgu River.

== Course ==
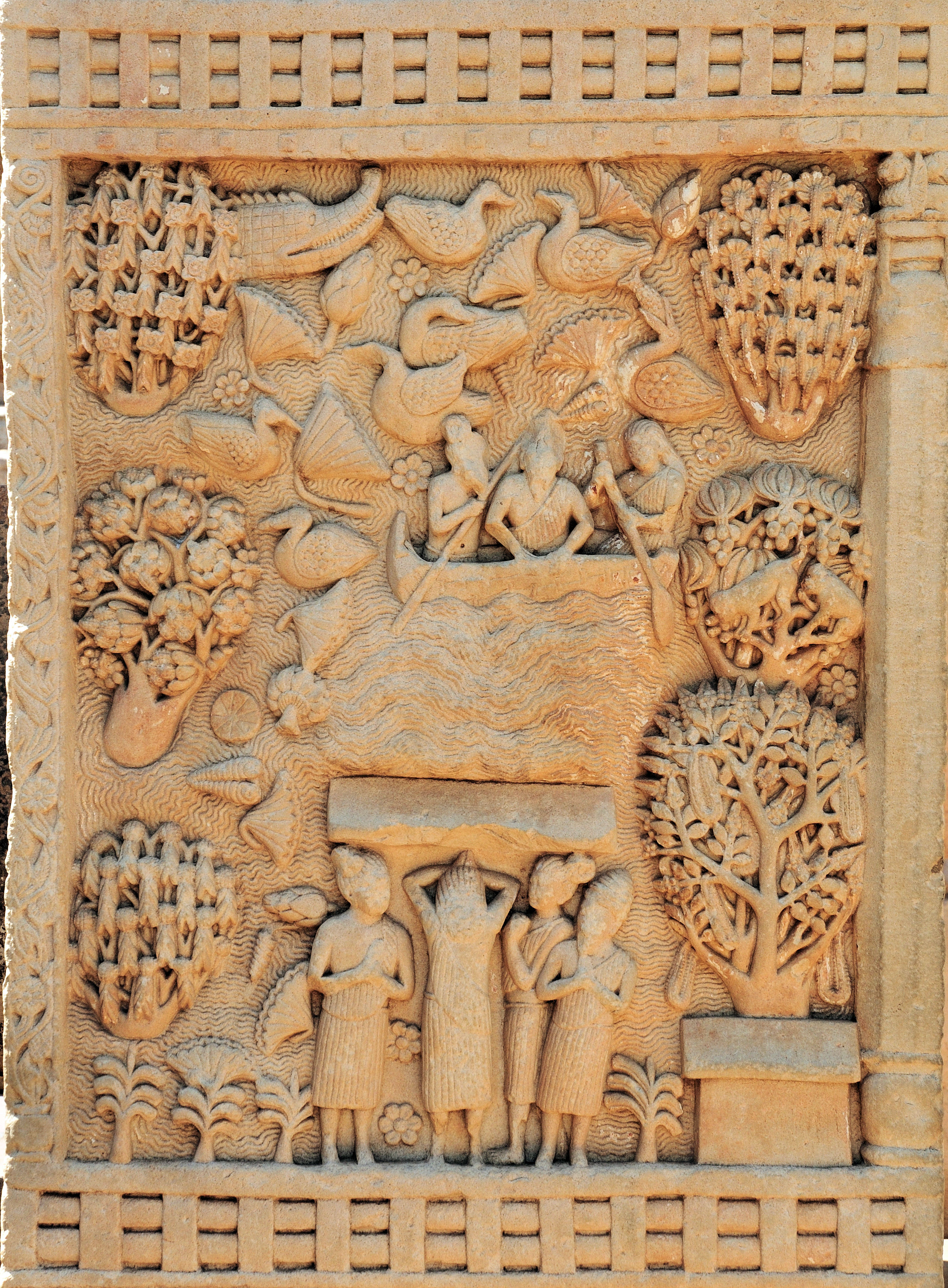
Miracle of the Buddha walking on the River Nairañjanā. The Buddha is not visible (aniconism), only represented by a path on the water, and his empty throne bottom right. Sanchi.

The Lilājan begins its journey north of Simaria in Chatra district on the Hazaribagh plateau, the western portion of which constitutes a broad watershed between the Damodar drainage on the south and the Lilājan and Mohana rivers on the north. It flows through a deep and rocky channel until it reaches the neighbourhood of Jori. There the hills begin to recede and the stream flows sluggishly over a wide sandy bed. From this point to the Gaya border beyond Hunterganj the river becomes sandy. It is dry in summer but disastrous during the rains. About 10 kilometres (6 mi) south of Gaya it unites with the Mohana River to form the Falgu River.

== Bichkiliya waterfalls ==
The water falls into a dah or natural reservoir in the Lilājan River. It is 11 kilometres (7 mi) west of Chatra – about half the distance is motorable, while the rest is only able to be traversed on foot.

== Buddhism ==
Before attaining Enlightenment, the prince Siddhārtha Gautama practiced asceticism for six years (ten or twelve years according to some accounts) on the banks of the river, residing in a forest near the village of Uruvilvā (Bodh Gaya). (Note: Bodh Gaya: Historically, the place was known as Uruvilvā in the Buddha’s time. It was not until the 18th or 19th century that the site came to be known as Bodh Gaya (consulted source: Juergensmeyer, Mark; Roof, Wade Clark (2011). Encyclopedia of Global Religion. SAGE Publications. p. 147-148. ISBN 9781452266565. Archived from the original on 12 March 2023.) After realizing that strict asceticism would not lead to Enlightenment, he recuperated after bathing in the river and receiving a bowl of milk-rice from the milkmaid Sujātā.

He sat under the nearby pippala tree, where he finally achieved Enlightenment. This tree became known as the Bodhi Tree, and the site became known as Bodh Gayā.
