= Gurdwara Guru Singh Sabha Kedli Kalan =

Gurdwara Guru Singh Sabha, Kedli Kalan
- Interactive map of the Gurdwara Guru Singh Sabha, Kedli Kalan area

General information
- Architectural style: Sikh architecture
- Location: Kedli Kalan, Hunterganj, Jharkhand, India
- Coordinates: 24.42597°N 84.82071°E
- Completed: 18th Century

Gurdwara Guru Singh Sabha, Kedli Kalan, is one of the oldest gurdwara of Eastern India.

== History ==
When Guru Nanak was on his first Udasi he travelled towards East of India and passed through Bihar. He came and stopped at Kedli Chatti (Kalan) situated on the banks of and he taught about Sikhism to local population which attracted a lot of locals.

Guru Tegh Bahadur, also visited the place while his travel towards Gaya and Patna from Varanasi. Gurdwara also have a 200 year old hand-written Guru Granth Sahib.

Few Nanakpanthi Hindus used to live here but later, some converted Agrahari Sikh from Eastern Uttar Pradesh used to come here for timber business and finally settled here after knowing the place related to the Udasi tour of Guruji. They also built a gurdwara at Dumari area of Hunterganj.

== See also ==
- Takht Sri Patna Sahib
