= Religion in Jharkhand =

Overview of religion in Jharkhand

Religion in Jharkhand
1. Hinduism (67.8%)
2. Islam (14.5%)
3. Sarnaism (12.5%)
4. Christianity (4.31%)
5. Sikhism (0.22%)
6. Others (0.41%)
7. Not stated (0.19%)

Hinduism is the majority religion in Jharkhand, followed by nearly 67.83% of total population as of 2011 census. Islam and Sarnaism are the next two largest religions with 14.53% and 12.52% adhering to them respectively.Christianity has a significant minority in the state, followed by 4.3%. A small numbers of Sikhs and other religion are also present.

Jharkhand is a diverse state of India and has a diverse religious population, where the majority of the population follow Hinduism, with Islam as the second most followed religion. The state has also a very high proportion of tribal population, where the majority religion is Sarnaism. In recent times, due to missionary activities, there has been a significant rise of Christianity in Jharkhand which is more than the national average population of Christians in India. Small communities of Agrahari Sikh and Jains also exist in the state.

== Demographics ==
Religion wise historical population of Jharkhand (incl. Bihar prior to 2001 census)
Religion Census	Total population	Hinduism	Islam	Christianity	Budhisim	Sikhism	Jainism	Other religions	Not Stated
1951	38,786,184	33,075,664	4,373,360	415,548	1,092	37,947	8,165	874,408	
1961	46,455,610	39,347,050	5,785,631	502,195	2,885	44,413	17,598	755,838	
1971	56,353,369	47,031,801	7,594,173	658,717	4,806	61,520	25,185	976,997	170
1981	69,914,734	58,011,070	9,874,993	740,186	3,003	77,704	27,613	1,179,878	287
1991	86,374,465	71,193,417	12,787,985	843,717	3,518	78,212	23,049	1,443,258	1,309
2001	26,945,829	18,475,681	3,731,308	1,093,382	5,940	83,358	16,301	3,514,472	25,387
2011	32,988,134	22,376,051	4,793,994	1,418,608	8,956	71,422	14,974	4,235,786	68,343

Population by religion (%)
S. No.	Religion	2001	2011
1.	Hinduism	68.50	67.83
2.	Islam	13.80	14.53
3.	Sarnaism	13.04	12.52
4.	Christianity	4.05	4.31
5.	Sikhism	0.31	0.22
6.	Others	0.8	0.41
7.	Not stated	n/a	0.19

== Islam ==
The first Muslim contingents arrived in the territory over 800 years ago and settled in the villages of Mundas. The first mosque of Jharkhand was built in 1661 in Dayoodnagar, followed by madrasas. In 1740, Hidamatullah Khan was nominated as jagirdar of Japla Hussainabad in Jharkhand. Baptist Hoffman, a German Jesuit linguist and missionary to the Mundas in India, mentioned that over the years, Mundari dialects have borrowed several words from Arabic and Persian. Other historical records such as Ranchi Gazetteers note that the history of Muslims in Jharkhand began during the reign of Sher Shah Suri. A large number of Muslims settled in the Chhota Nagpur region.

Muslims in Jharkhand have historically integrated into the society.

Islam is followed by 14.5% of the state's population. Muslims in Jharkhand are significant and diverse community, consisting of both indigenous and immigrants significantly. Industrial cities of Jamshedpur and Bokaro have Muslim families from Uttar Pradesh, Tamil Nadu, Andhra Pradesh and Telangana.

== See also ==
- Agrahari Sikh
- Christianity in Jharkhand
