= Kauleshwari Temple =

Temple in Jharkhand, India

- Location of Kauleswari Temple Kauleshwari Temple (India)

Religion
- Affiliation: Hindu
- Deity: Kauleshwari Devi (Sati / Kali)
- Status: Open

Location
- Location: Kolhua Hill, Hunterganj, Chatra district, Jharkhand
- Country: India
- Interactive map of Kauleshwari Temple
- Coordinates: 24.376273°N 84.864287°E

Architecture
- Completed: 10th century

Kauleshwari Temple is a pilgrimage centre where Kauleshwari Devi, a form of Sati/Kali, is worshipped. It is in the Chatra subdivision of Chatra district in Jharkhand, India.

== Geography ==
Cities, towns and locations in Chatra district in North Chotanagpur Division
M: municipality, CT: census town, R: rural/ urban centre, H: historical/ religious centre, P: power plant, T: tourist centre
Abbreviation used - TPS: thermal power station
Owing to space constraints in the small map, the actual locations in a larger map may vary slightly

=== Location ===
Kauleshwari Temple is located at 24.376273°N 84.864287°E on Kolhua Hill 6 miles (9.7 km) from Hunterganj, now known as Shaligram Ramnarayanpur. There is a bridge across the Lilajan River, which flows in between. Kolhua Hill is 1,575 feet (480 m) high. The hilltop offers a fascinating view of the area, referred to as akash lochan (sky eye).

Note: The map alongside presents some of the notable locations in the district. All places marked in the map are linked in the larger full screen map.

== Multi religious links ==
Thousands of devotees belonging to the Hindu, Jain and Buddhist communities visit the Kolhua Hill all round the year. The place is linked with both Ramayana and Mahabharata, the two Sanskrit epics of ancient India. While the Pandavas spent some days here during their exile (agyatvas), Rama, Sita and Lakshmana came here during their exile (vanvas). The place is also considered to be a Shakta pitha, as the womb of Sati fell here.

A footprint found on the hill is believed to be that of the 23rd Jain tirthankara Parshvanatha. The hill had a Jain temple built in 1682. It was destroyed by invaders and a new temple was built later. There is a cave where there is a 2-foot idol of Parshvanatha, in a sitting posture. There are many broken idols in the cave. It is believed that many idols were thrown into the lake located nearby. There is a rock-cut temple with images of rock-cut Digambar Jain idols.

Gautama Buddha, on attainment of enlightenment, spent some time here before proceeding to Sarnath for preaching. He also had his head shaved here. Now-a-days, many Buddhists, come to have their heads shaved here.

== Fair ==
During the Hindu festivals of Vasant Panchami and Ram Navami, Kolhua Mela is organised here.
