= Bakraur =

- Village
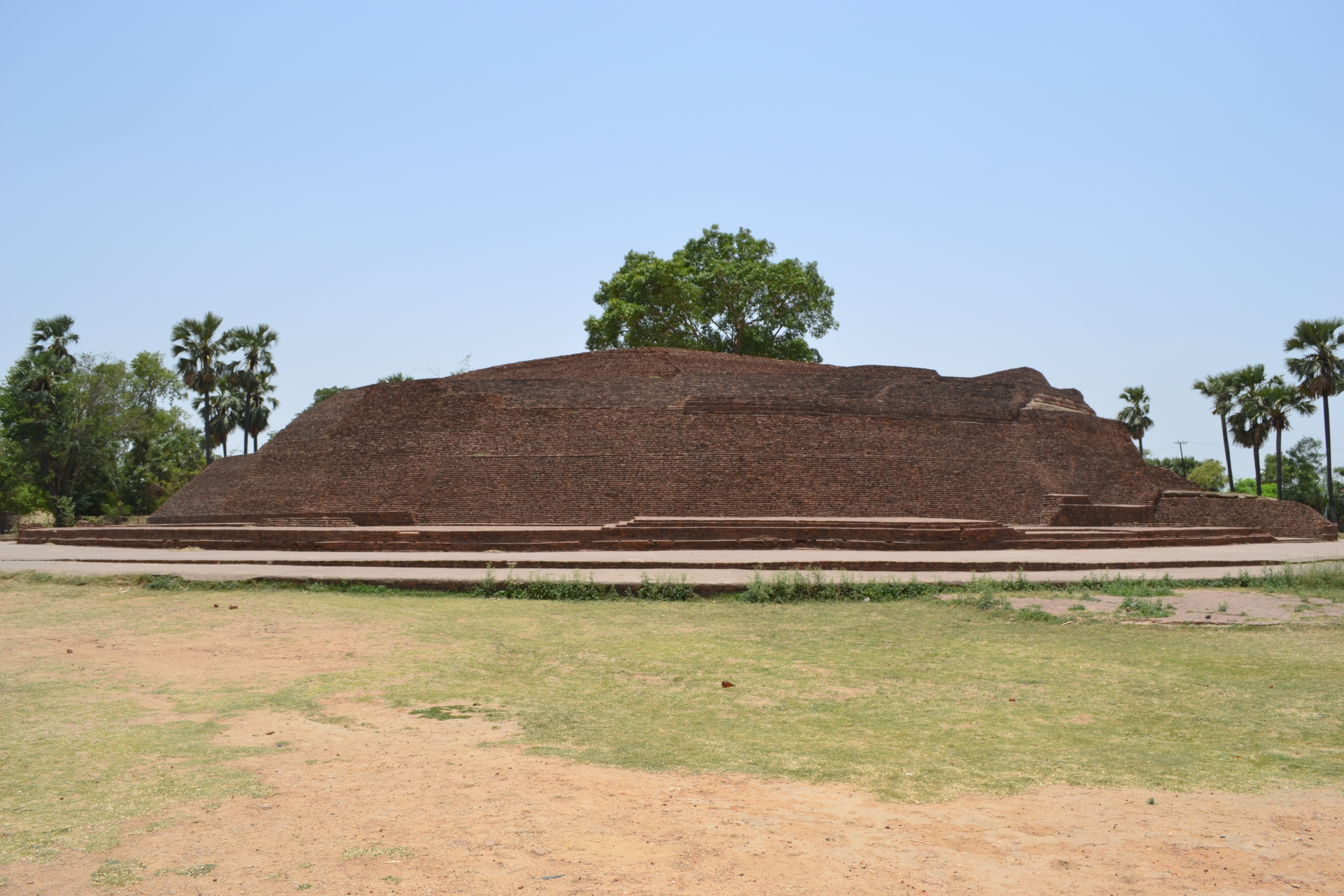
- Sujata Garh Stupa

- Location in Bihar, India Bakraur (India)
- Coordinates: 24.6979734°N 85.0034624°E
- Country: India
- State: Bihar
- District: Gaya
- Elevation: 74 m (243 ft)

Languages
  - Official: Magahi, Hindi
- Time zone: UTC+5:30 (IST)
- PIN: 824231
- Telephone code: 91-631
- Vehicle registration: BR-02

Bakraur, sometimes called Bakrour, is a village located slightly east of Bodh Gaya in the state of Bihar, India. It lies directly across the Phalgu River from the town of Bodh Gaya, where Gautama Buddha is said to have attained enlightenment.

The village of Bakraur is believed to be the home of Sujata, who is said to have fed Gautama Buddha milk and rice shortly before he attained Enlightenment. A stupa dedicated to Sujata has been erected in Bakraur (photo).

== See also ==
- List of Monuments of National Importance in Bihar
