= Madhupayasa =

Madhupāyāsa is a Pali language term appearing in certain versions of the Tipitaka in Thailand. It is mentioned in the life story of the Buddha as his first meal following six years of extreme asceticism, given to him by Sujata. It probably refers to a honey-infused kheer or pāyāsa, a rice pudding dish dating back to Ancient India. Today, the name is used for a group of sweetened rice dishes made as offerings in Buddhist festivals in Thailand.
