= Hunterganj =

Hunterganj Shaligram Ramnarayanpur
- Town
- Location in Jharkhand, India Hunterganj (India)
- Coordinates: 24°27′0″N 84°49′0″E
- Country: India
- State: Jharkhand
- District: Chatra

Area
  - Total: 15 km^{2} (5.8 sq mi)
- Elevation: 169 m (554 ft)

Population
  - Total: 100,000
  - Density: 6,700/km^{2} (17,000/sq mi)

Languages (*For language details see Shaligram Ramnarayanpur (community development block)#Language and religion)
  - Official: Hindi, Urdu
- Time zone: UTC+5:30 (IST)
- PIN: 825420
- Vehicle registration: JH
- Coastline: 0 kilometres (0 mi)
- Nearest city: Gaya
- Sex ratio: 10:7 ♂/♀
- Lok Sabha constituency: Chatra
- Climate: natural (Köppen)
- Avg. summer temperature: 35 °C (95 °F)
- Avg. winter temperature: 15 °C (59 °F)
- Website: chatra.nic.in

Hunterganj (Shaligram Ramnarayapur), is a historic town in the Chatra subdivision of the Chatra district, Jharkhand, India.

== Etymology ==
The town is now named after Shaligram Singh and Ram Narayan Singh, two eminent freedom fighters of Chatra district (then Hazaribagh district).

== Geography ==
Cities, towns and locations in Chatra district in North Chotanagpur Division
M: municipality, CT: census town, R: rural/ urban centre, H: historical/ religious centre, P: power plant, T: tourist centre
Abbreviation used - TPS: thermal power station
Owing to space constraints in the small map, the actual locations in a larger map may vary slightly

=== Location ===
It is located at 24°27′0″N 84°49′0″E at an elevation of 169 m above MSL.

Hunterganj is an old town. The nearest railway station is at Gaya and the nearest airport is Gaya Airport. Hunterganj is on NH 99 and stands on the banks of Lilajan River.

=== Area overview ===
The map alongside shows that the forests (mark the light shading), covering around 60% of Chatra district, are evenly spread across the district. It is a plateau area with an elevation of about 450 metres (1,476 ft) above mean sea level. Efforts are on to get the first unit of the NTPC Limited’s North Karanpura Thermal Power Station (3x660 MW), ready in 2021.North Karanpura Coalfield of Central Coalfields Limited, spread over 1,230 square kilometres (470 sq mi) in the southern part of the district, with spill over to neighbouring districts, and having coal reserves of 14 billion tonnes is among the biggest in India. The map provides links to three CCL operational areas.

Note: The map alongside presents some of the notable locations in the district. All places marked in the map are linked in the larger full screen map.

== Civic administration ==
=== Police station ===
Hunterganj police station serves Shaligram Ramnarayanpur CD block.

=== CD block HQ ===
Headquarters of Shaligram Ramnarayanpur CD block is at Hunterganj.

== Places of Interest ==
- Kauleshwari Temple, one of the shaktipeethas of state situated at Kolhua Hill.
- Shri Kolhua Pahad Digambar Jain Teerth Kshetra, the place where Jain tirthankar, Shitalnatha got enlightened. Many temples and a cave related to 4th century are found here.
- Gurdwara Guru Singh Sabha Kedli Kalan, a historic place visited by Guru Nanak while his first Udasi tour and Guru Tegh Bahadur while his travel toward east. It also have 200 years old handwritten Guru Granth Sahib.
- Jori Pahari Temple, a temple dedicated to Hindu god, Hanuman, situated at Jori Hill in Jori Kalan

== Education ==
R.N.M. College at Hunterganj is affiliated with the Vinoba Bhave University.
