= Mohana River =

Mohana River Mohani River

Location
- Country: India
- State: Jharkhand, Bihar
- City: Itkhori

Physical characteristics
- Source: Korambe Pahar
  - location: Hazaribagh district
- Mouth: Falgu River
  - location: Gaya district
  - coordinates: 24°43′41″N 85°00′47″E

The Mohana River (also called Mohani River/Mohane River) flows through the Hazaribagh, Chatra and Gaya districts in the Indian states of Jharkhand and Bihar.

== Course ==
The Mohana originates on Korambe Pahar on the Hazaribagh plateau near Bendi village, 19.3 kilometres (12.0 mi) from Hazaribagh It drains the upper part of the plateau. The western portion of the Hazaribagh plateau constitutes a broad watershed between the Damodar drainage on the south and the Lilajan (also called Niranjana) and Mohana rivers on the north.

The Mohana then runs north past Itkhori, descends into the Gaya Plains, and crosses the Grand Trunk Road / NH 2 at the foot of the Danua pass. Near Itkhori it intersects the Chatra-Chauparan Road with its wide and sandy channel. 3.2 kilometres (2.0 mi) below Bodh Gaya it unites with the Lilajan (Niranjana) to form the Falgu. When it goes past the Barabar Hills, it again takes the name of Mohana, and divides into two branches.

== Waterfalls ==
In the long range of hills south of the border of Gaya district, well inside Chatra district, there are two waterfalls of the Mohana. The first at Tamasin is at the head of deep valley where the river plunges abruptly down a high steep face of black rock in to a shady pool below and then dashes down a gloomy gorge of strangely contorted rock; the lower falls at Hariakhal presents a scene of more placid beauty, as here the river, issuing through a picturesque glen, glides down the sloping slide of red rocks into a still, large pond surrounded by high wooden banks. Tamasin is 26 kilometres (16 mi) from Chatra town.
