= Sujata (milkmaid) =

Lay woman who offered milk rice to Samana Gotama before his Enlightenment

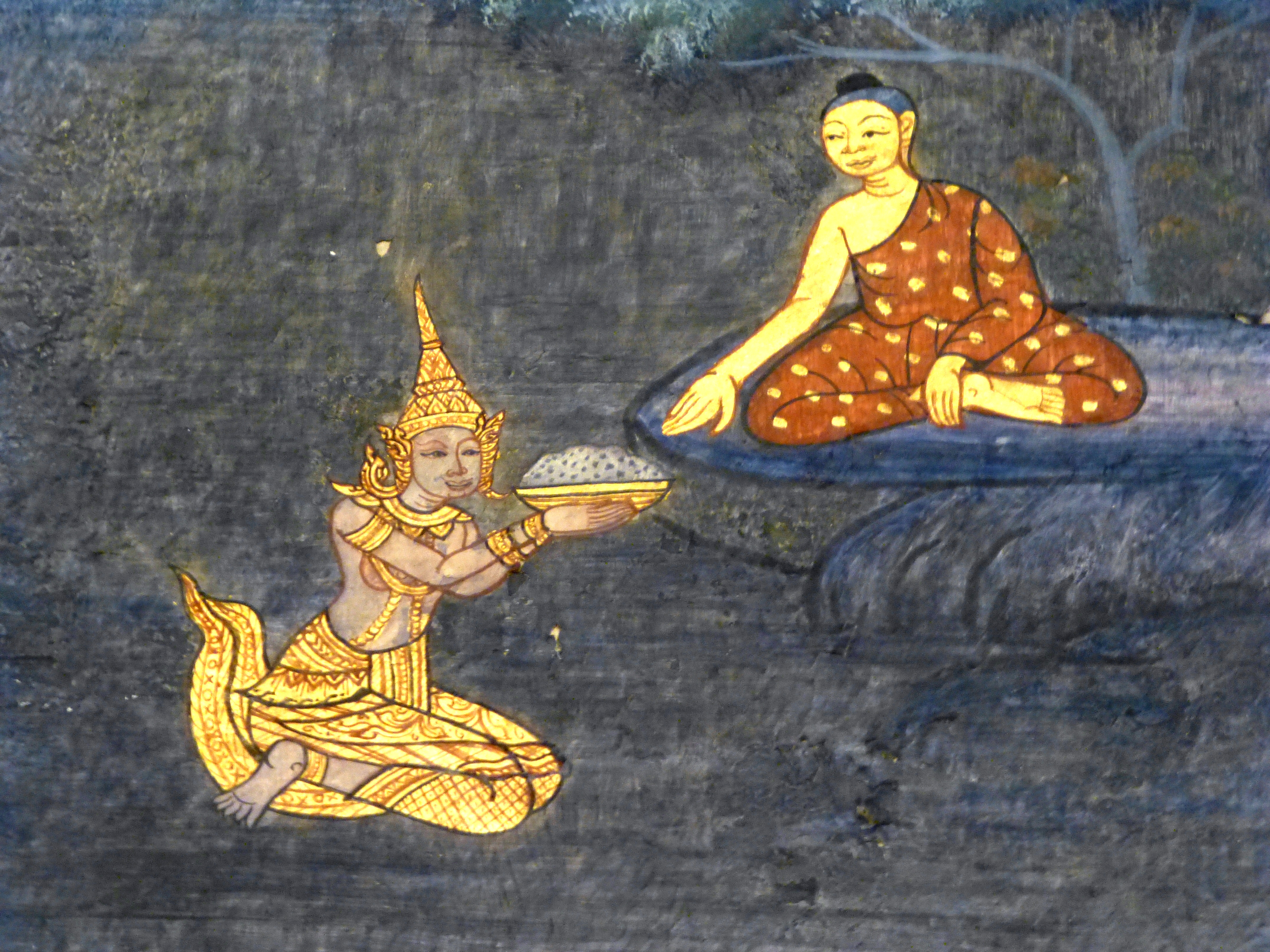
- Sujata offers Milk-Rice to the Buddha (art of Ayutthaya).

Personal life
- Known for: Offering kheer, thus breaking the seven year-long fast of Gautama Buddha, opening the way to his enlightenment.

Religious life
- Religion: Buddhism

Sujata, also Sujātā, or Nandabala , was a farmer's wife, who is said to have fed Gautama Buddha a bowl of kheer, a milk-rice pudding, ending his six years of asceticism. Such was his emaciated appearance that she wrongly believed him to be a tree-spirit nature deity that had granted her wish of having a child. The gift provided him enough strength to cultivate the Middle Way, develop jhana, and attain Bodhi, thereafter becoming known as the Buddha

In a previous life, she is said to have met Padumuttara Buddha, who predicted that one day she would be the first lay disciple of a Buddha of the future.

The village of Bakraur near Bodh Gaya is believed to be her home. The Sujata Stupa was dedicated to her there in the 2nd century BCE. There is also the Sujata Temple, which today is a place of pilgrimage and a popular tourist site.

== Story ==
The main sources used by the authors mentioned below are the Lalitavistara Sūtra, Chapter 18 (Note: Only a few authors are cited in this article, as it would have been difficult to name them all.), and Aśvaghoṣa, which, in his poem Buddhacharita, Canto 12, mentions Sujata under the name Nandabala. Sujata, sometimes called Nandabala, was the daughter of a wealthy landowner named Seniya (Note: According to Alexander Cunningham Sujata's father was called "Nandika": Maha Bodhi or the great Buddhist Temple under the Bodhi Tree at Bodh Gaya, p.2, 1892..), from the village of Sanani (now called Bakraur), near the forest of Uruvela (now called Bodh Gaya (Note: Bodh Gaya: Historically, the place was known as Uruvela in the Buddha’s time. It was not until the 18th or 19th century that the site came to be known as Bodh Gaya (consulted source: Juergensmeyer, Mark; Roof, Wade Clark (2011). Encyclopedia of Global Religion. SAGE Publications. pp. 147–148. ISBN 9781452266565. Archived from the original on 12 March 2023.)), which is situated by the bank of the Lilajan River.

Single, she wanted to find a good husband and have a child. The villagers told her that inside the banyan tree was a god who could grant her wish. So she began to make a daily offering, imploring the Deva to fulfil her double wish. Finally, she married and gave birth to a son (Note: Sujata's son was called Yasa. He later became a disciple of the Buddha and was ordained as a bhikkhu by him.).

Every year since then, on the full moon day of the Vaisakha month, she has placed a bowl of payasa (or kheer, rice pudding), at the foot of the tree as an offering to thank the deity. More than twenty years passed during which Sujata never forgot to make her annual thank-you offering.

At the same time, she addressed another prayer to the eight hundred Brahmins, asking them:

May the Bodhisatta finally receive an offering of food from me, attain enlightenment and become a Buddha!

One night, Sujata dreamt that a Deva was saying to her:

Bodhisatta had put aside his austerities and desired to partake of good and nourishing food, and now shall your prayer be accomplished.

A few days later, on the day of the full moon in May, she dreamt of the Deva again. She understood then that the day she had been waiting for so long had arrived.

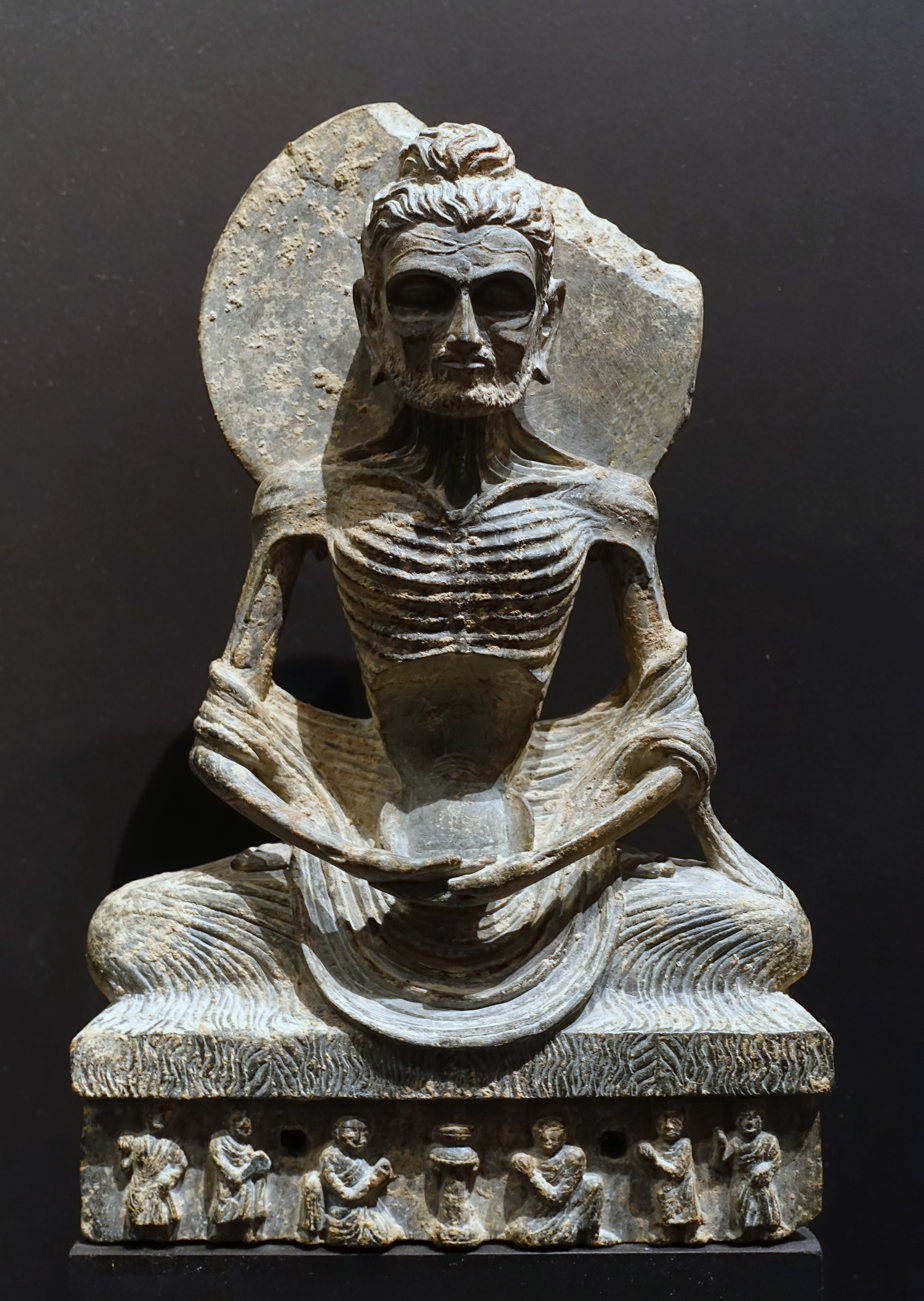
The fasting Buddha, receiving the gift of Sujata in the bottom relief (Gandhara, 2nd century CE).

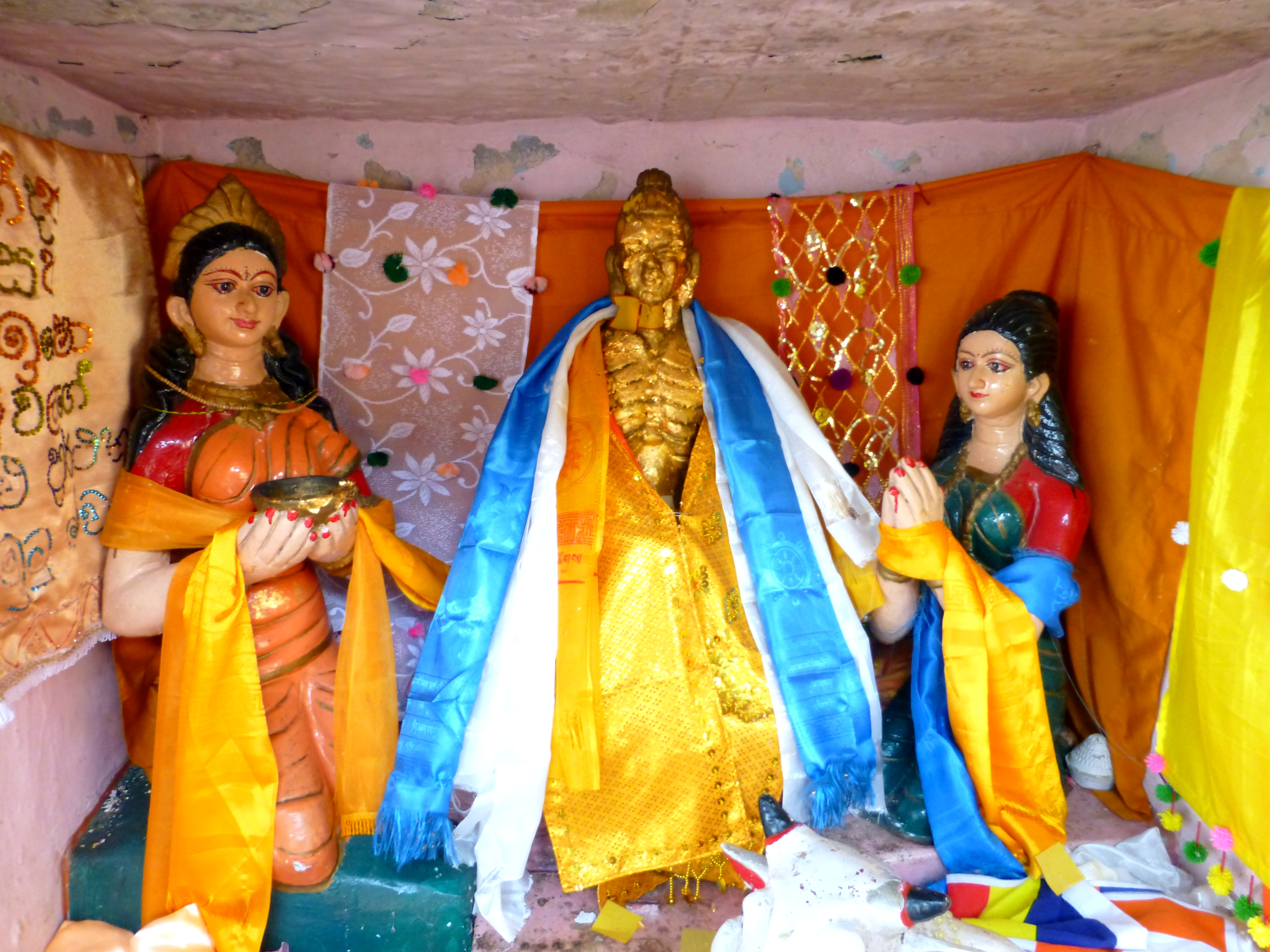
Sujata, the Bodhisatta and Punna. A votive altar at Sujata Temple in Bakraur.

She got up straight away and went to her father's herd. Making her offerings of payasa for so many years, she knew how to get the best milk: first, take the milk of 1000 cows, with which she fed another 500, repeating the same operation several times, with 250, then 125, etc., until she had the food to feed the last 8 cows (Note: The milk of 8 cows: symbolically this number probably refers to the Noble Eightfold Path.) whose milk was used to prepare the offering cakes. She called this operation « working the milk in and in ».

She sent her maid, named Punna (Note: Her name was Punna, Urmita or Uttara according to some accounts.), to the foot of the tree to make preparations for the ritual. When the girl saw a skeletal-looking man sitting in a meditation posture, she thought he was the tree Deva. She quickly ran to inform Sujata who arrived immediately. She was delighted to see who she assumed to be the guardian spirit of the tree. Bowing, she handed him the golden bowl containing the offering and said:

May your wish come true as mine did!

Siddhartha accepted, got up and walked to the river, taking the bowl with him. After bathing, he divided the rice cake into 49 pieces and ate them. When he had finished, he took the golden bowl and threw it into the river, saying:

If I can succeed in becoming a Buddha today, let this bowl go upstream, but if not, let it go downstream.

The golden bowl went upstream, remaining in the middle of the river, before sinking to the bottom. Siddhartha understood and returned to sit at the foot of the tree until he reached enlightenment. Sujata occupies a special place in the history of Buddhism, as she was both the last person to speak with the future Buddha and the first to speak to him after his Enlightenment. One day, when Buddha Gautama was talking about the main female lay disciples, he told the monks:

Bhikkhus, among My female lay-disciples who were the earliest to get established in the Refuges, Sujata, daughter of Seniya the householder, is the foremost.

== Sujata previous life ==
At the time of Padumuttara Buddha, the future Sujata was the daughter of a rich man from the town of Hamsavati. As she listened to the holy man speak, she saw the first female lay disciple take Three refuges. She told herself that one day she too would do the same. She made an offering to Padumuttara, and expressed her wish to him. He predicted that one day, she too would become the first disciple of a Buddha to come. Thousands of years passed and the young girl was reborn. She was Sujata, and her wish would be granted by Buddha Gautama.

== Sujata Stupa and Temple in Bakraur ==
A Stupa and a Temple dedicated to Sujata have been built in Bakraur, a village on the other side of the river about 2 km from Bodh Gaya.

The Sujata Stupa was built in the 2nd century BCE, as confirmed by finds of black polished wares and punch-marked coins in the attending monastery. It was built on the supposed site of her house, which was located on the other side of the river, opposite the Mahabodhi temple.

The Temple is of more recent construction (dating from the 19th/20th centuries (Note: Sujata Temple: the precise date of construction is not given in any of the sources consulted.)). It is both a place of pilgrimage and a tourist attraction.

Sujata Stupa and Temple in Bakraur.

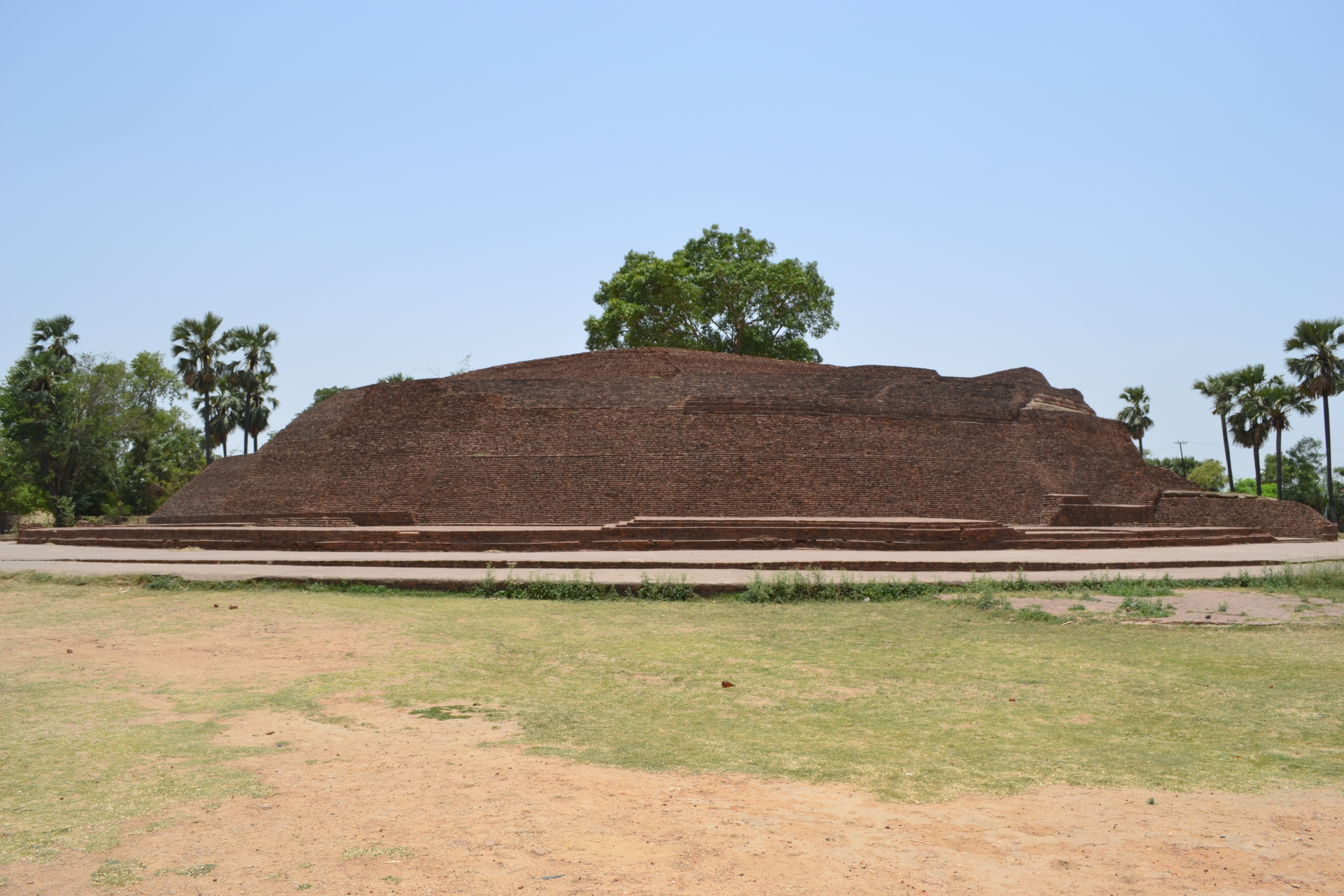
Sujata Stupa.
Ruins seen from afar.

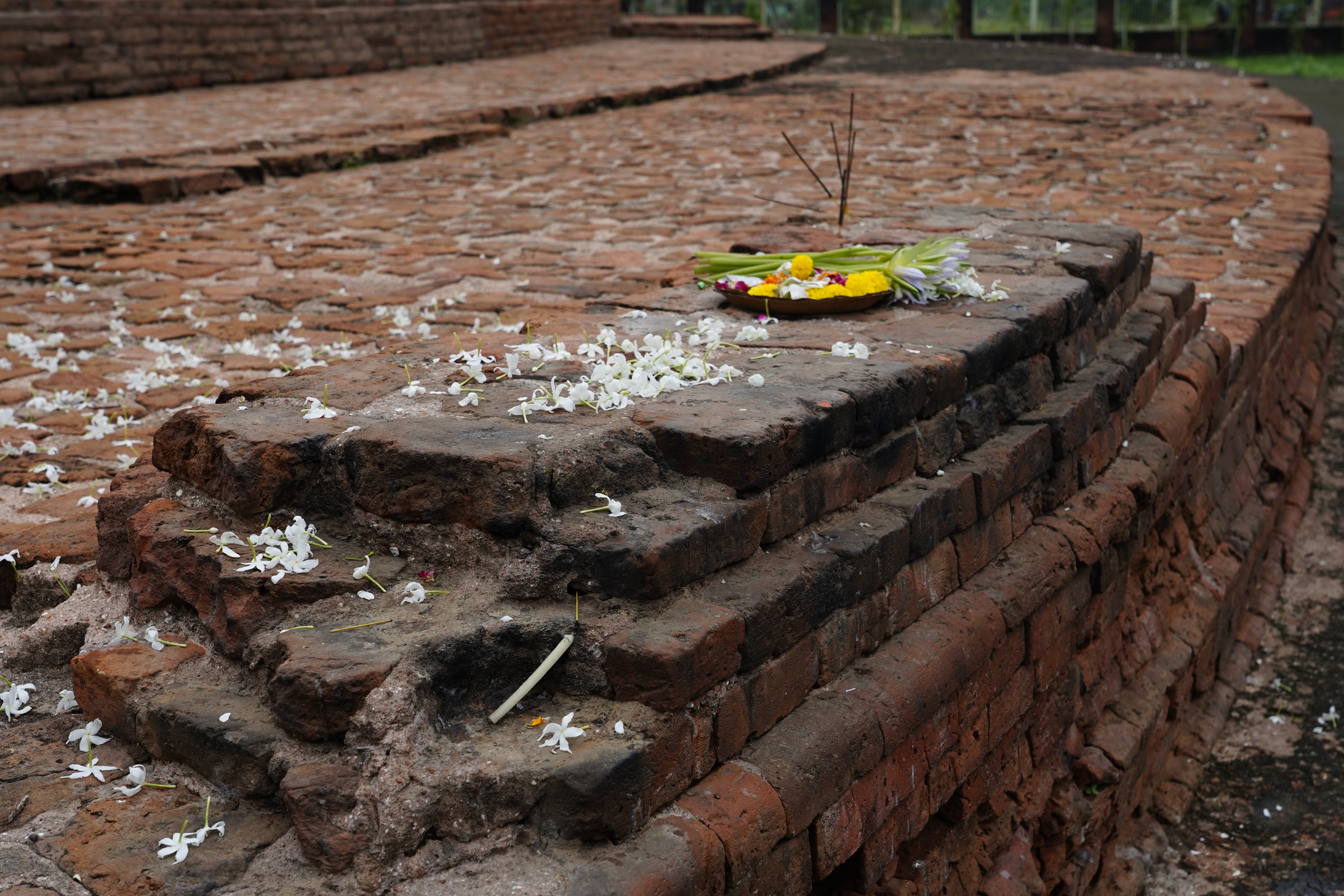
Sujata Stupa
Offering at the ruins.

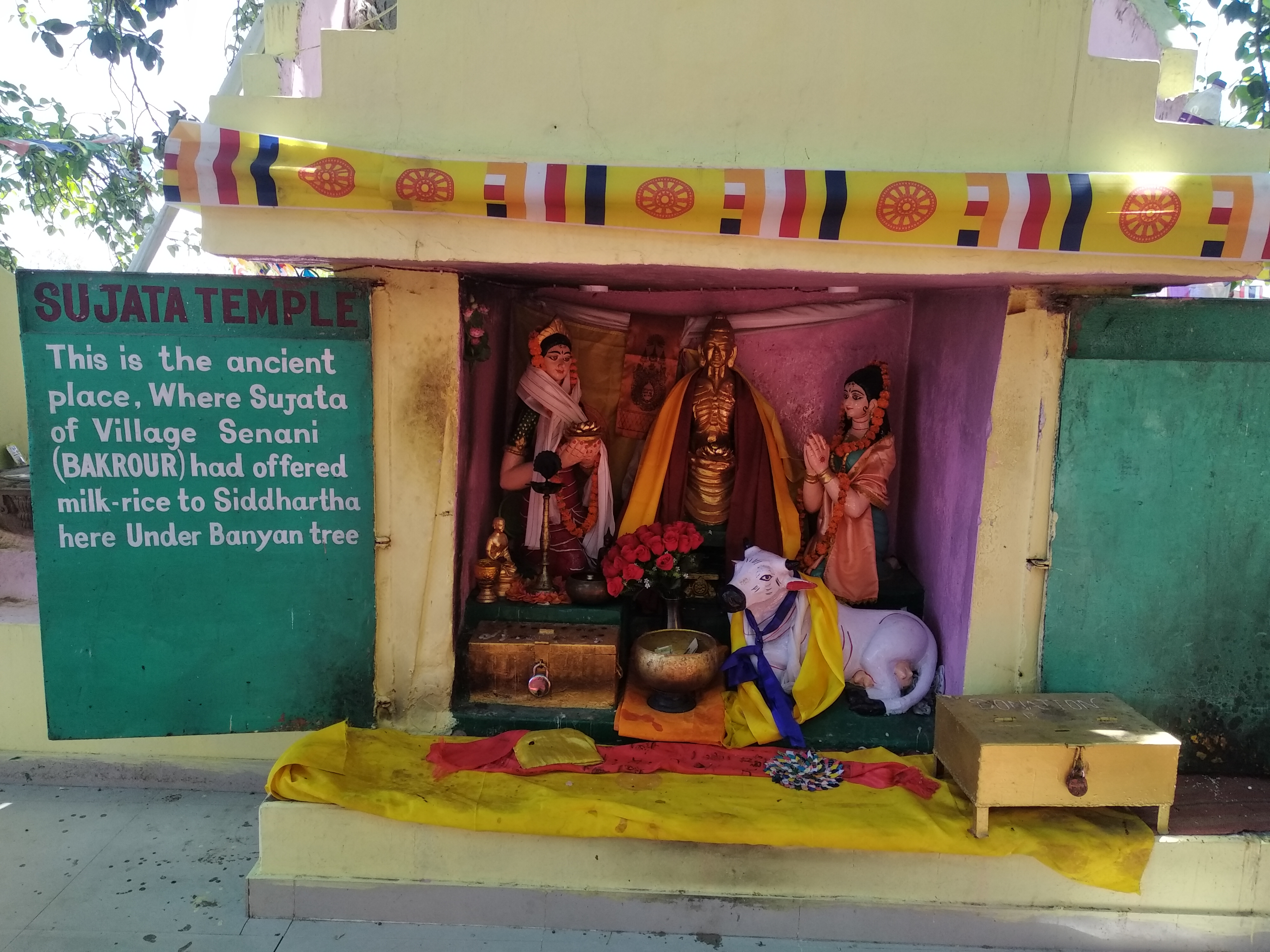
Sujata Temple.
A votive altar.

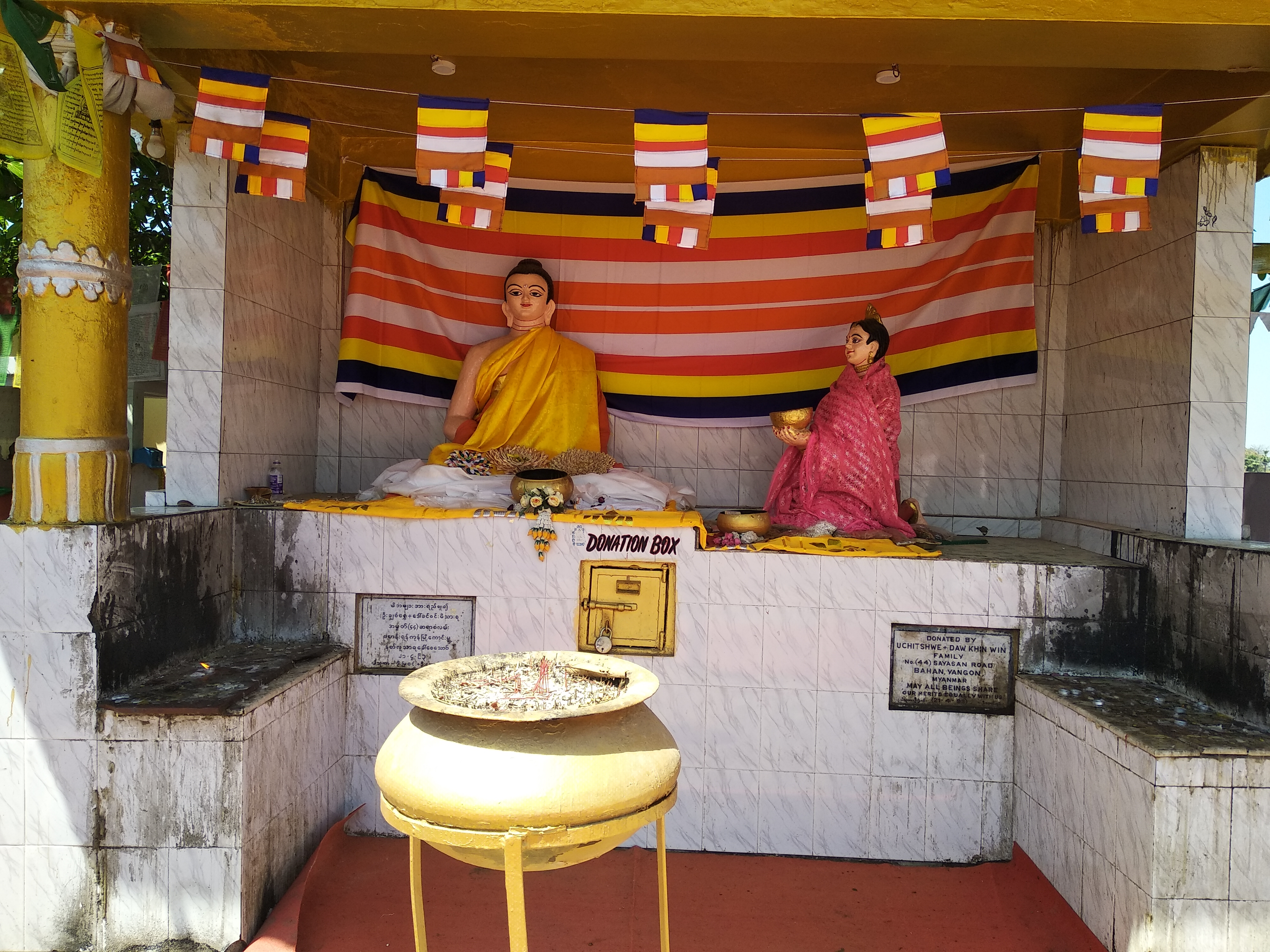
Sujata Temple.
A votive altar.

== Gallery ==
Some representations of Sujata offering rice pudding to Buddha.

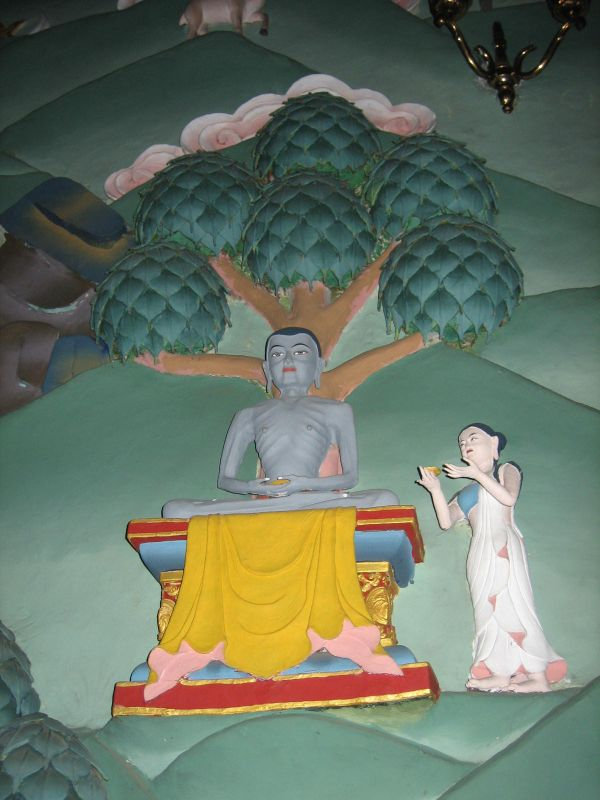
Unidentified temple in Bhutan.

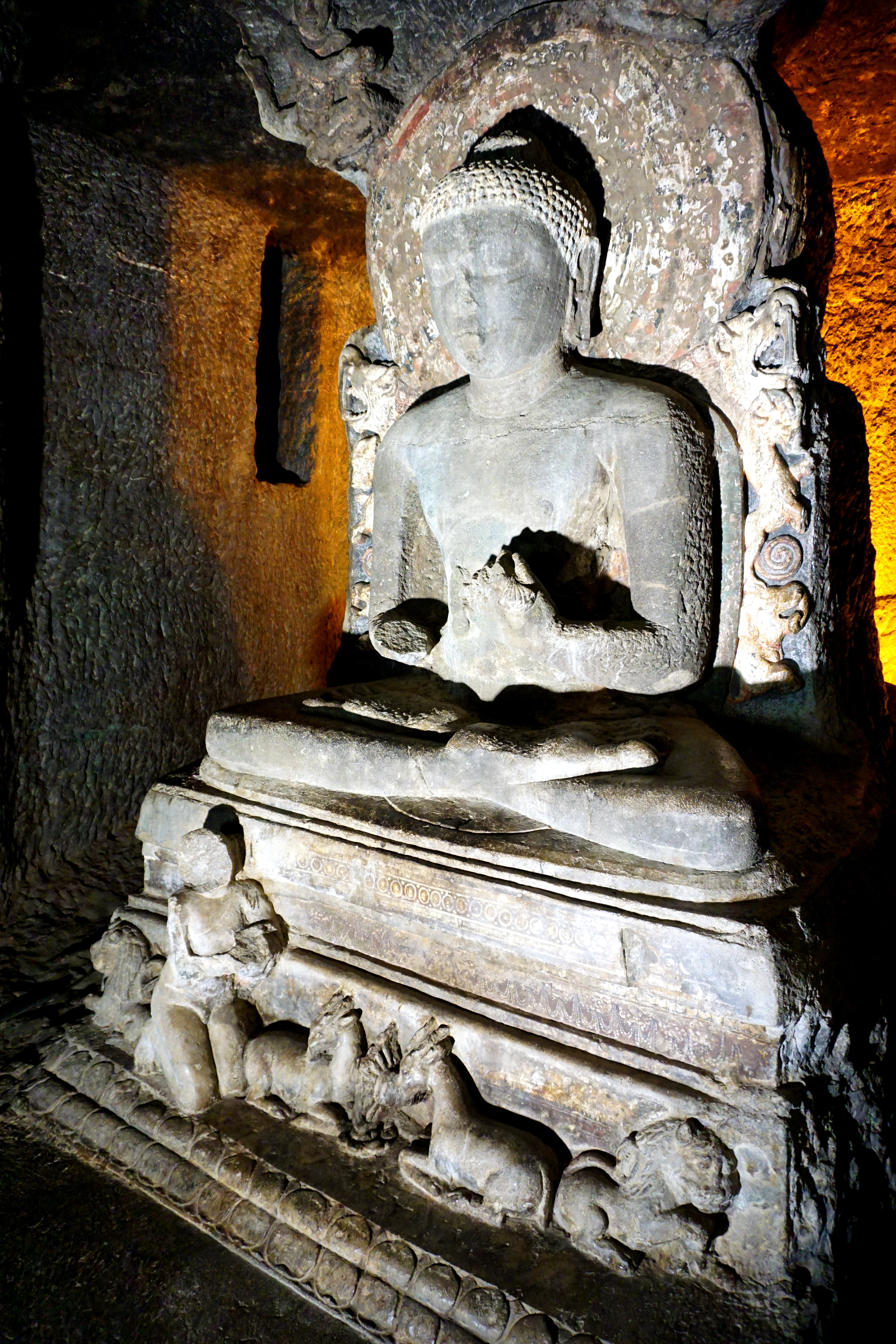
Ajanta (Cave 11), India.

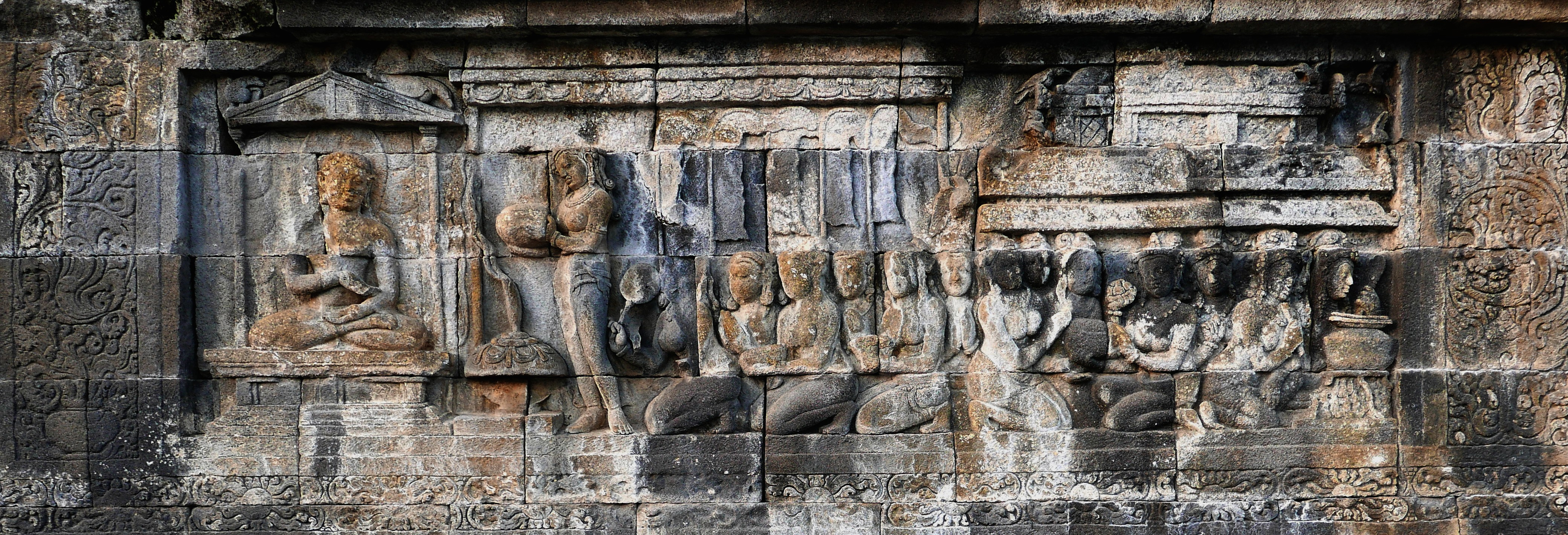
Borobudur Temple, Lalitavistara, Indonesia.

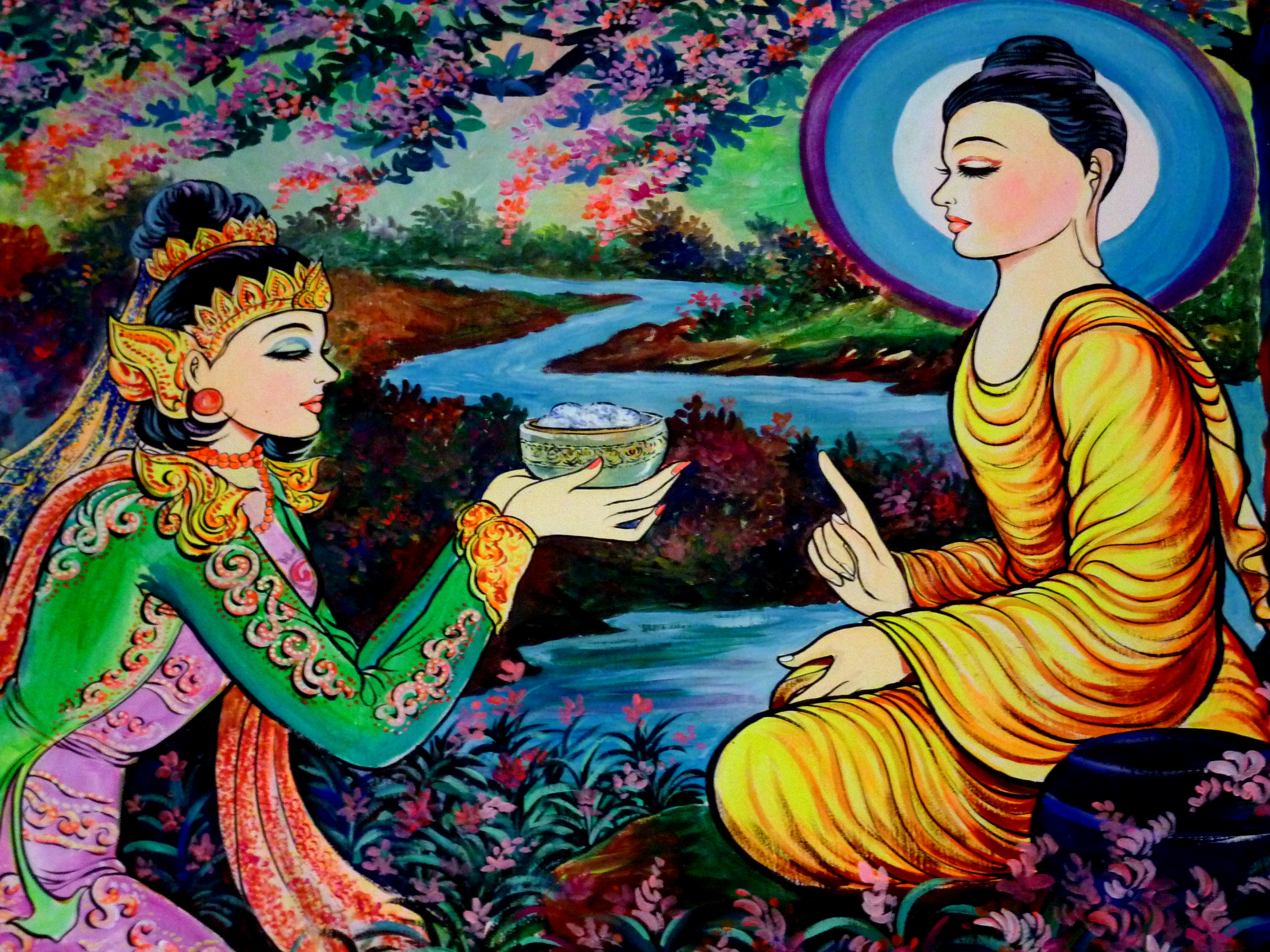
Wat Olak Vadu,
Kedah, Malaysia.

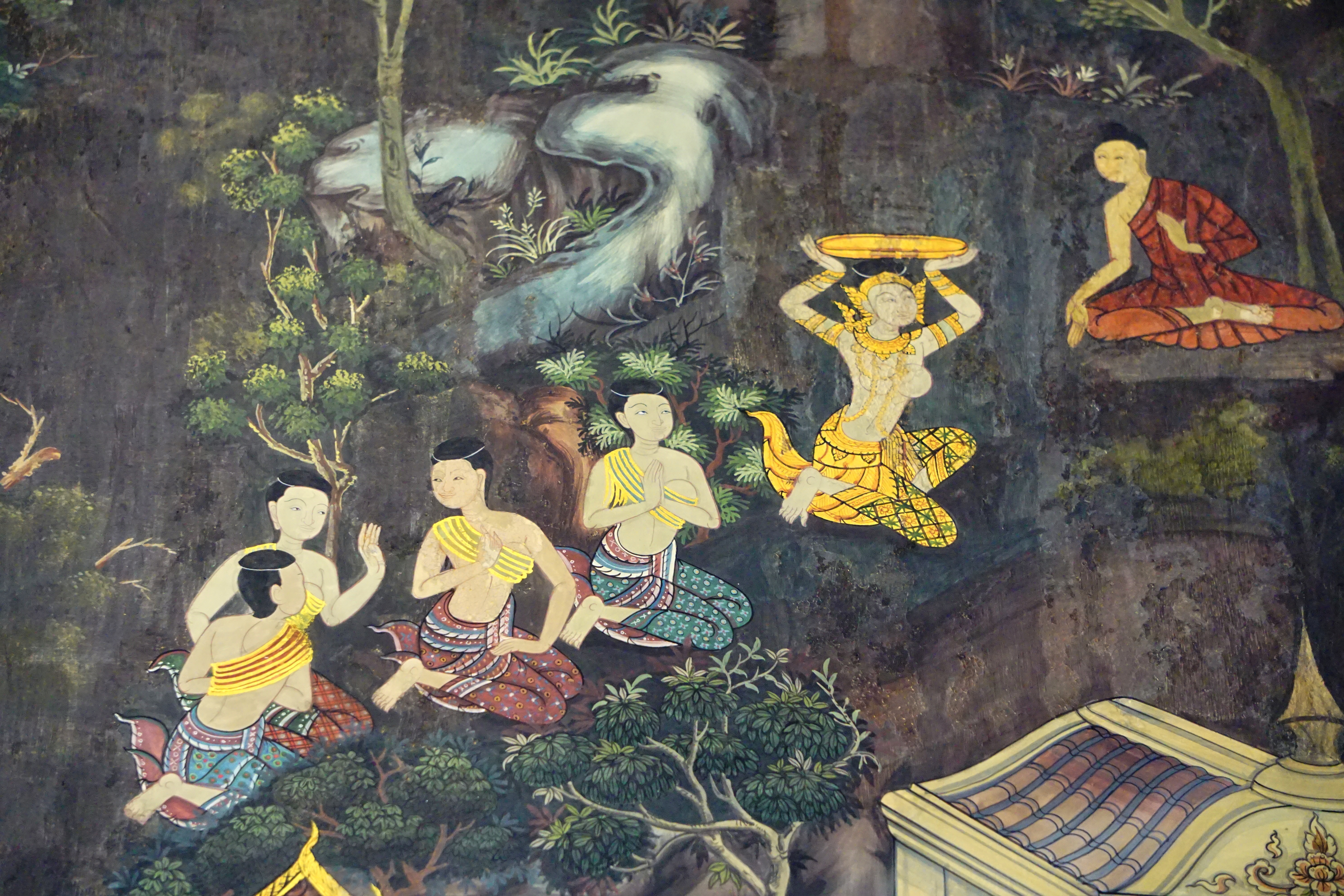
Wat Pho Temple, Bangkok, Thailand.

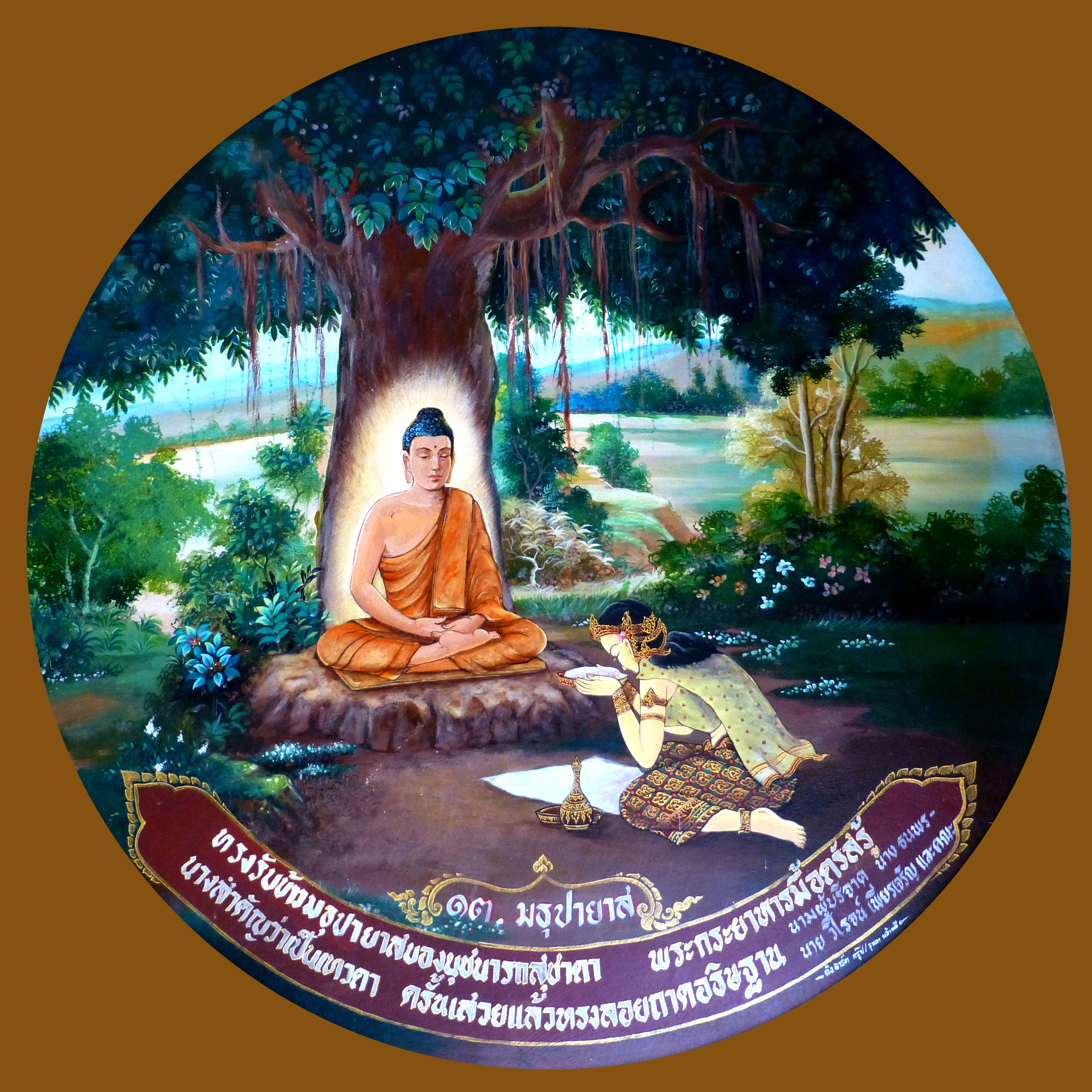
Traimongkhon Temple, Hat Yai, Thailand.

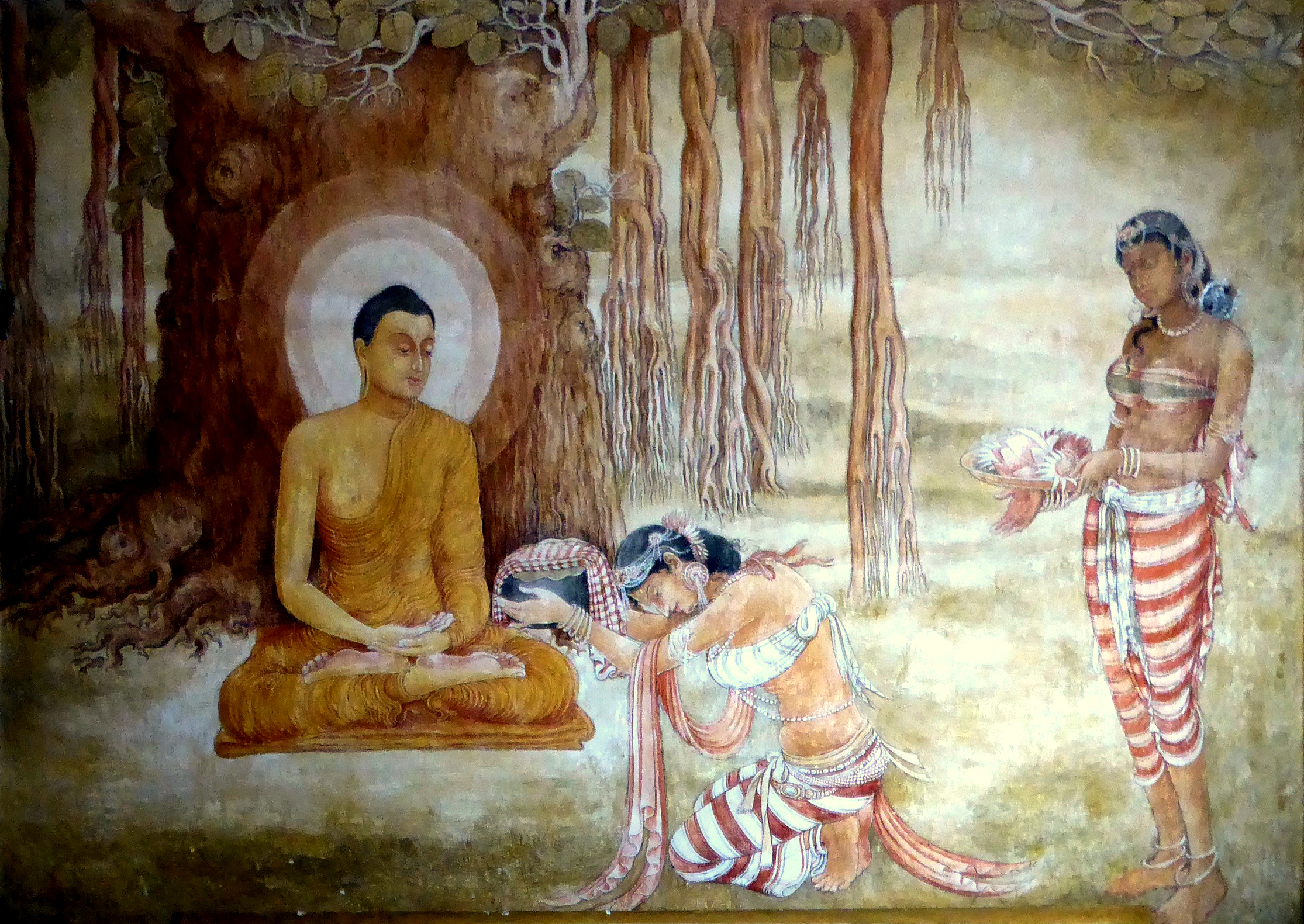
Kelaniya Temple, Kelaniya, Sri Lanka.

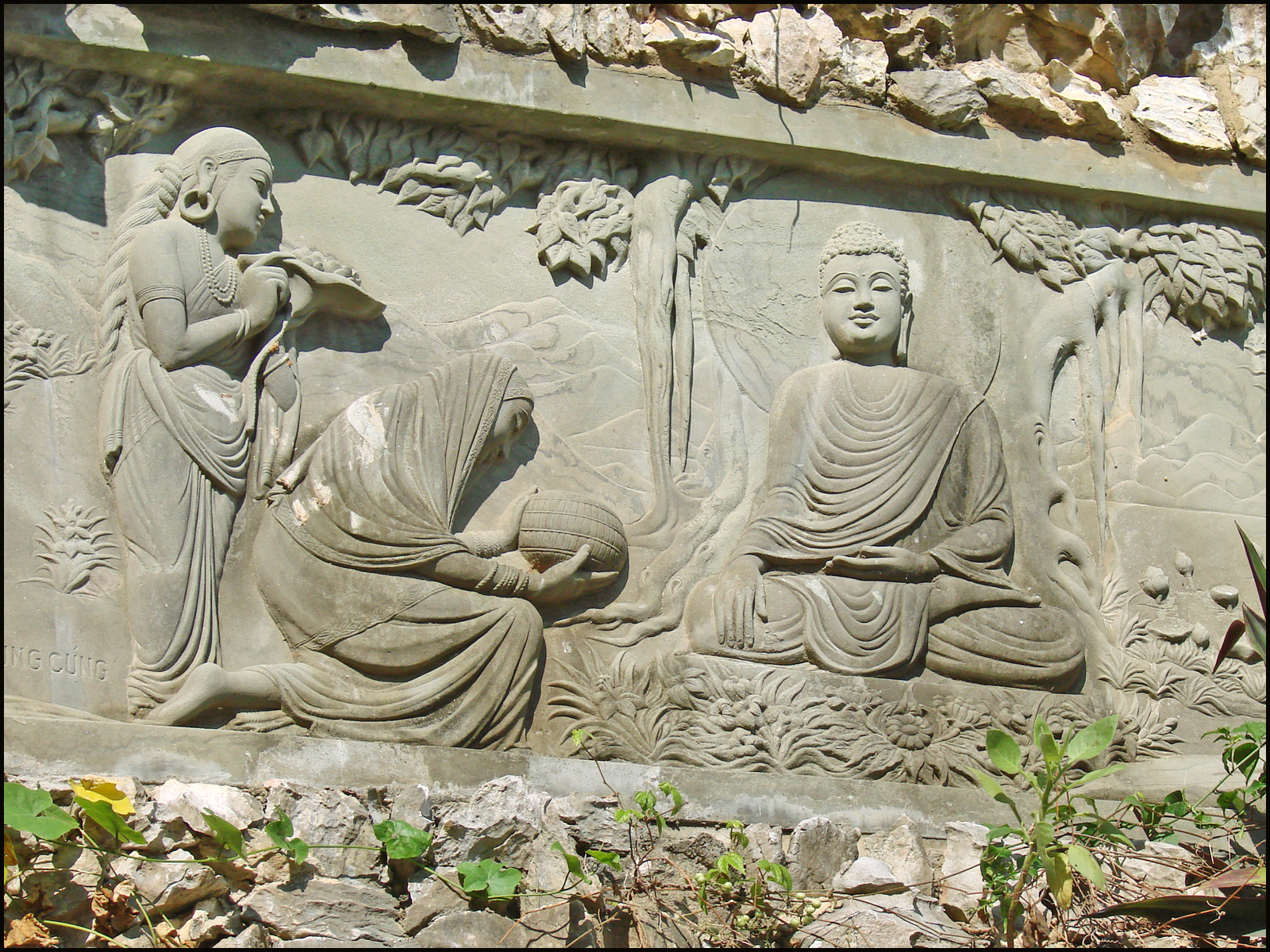
Marble Mountains,
Da Nang, Vietnam.

== Bibliography ==
- Alice Collet (2014). Women in Early Indian Buddhism: Comparative Textual Studies. Oxford University Press. p. 274. ISBN 9780199326044..
- Mingun Sayadaw (1991–1998). The Great chronicles of Buddhas, 6 volumes. Ti Ni Publishing Centre, Yangon. pp. 3583 (6 vol).. This is a translation from Burmese into English by U Ko Lay and U Tin Lwin. Each of the 6 volumes is in 2 parts, making a total of 12 books. The original Burmese text is the work of the Venerable Mingun Sayadaw, who wrote it from 1956 to 1969.. A more recent digital edition (2008) is available online (see details in the "External links" section).
