= Jori Kalan =

Jori
- Town
- Location in jharkhand, India Jori (India)
- Coordinates: 24.2045100°N 84.8770400°E
- Country: India
- State: Jharkhand
- District: Chatra

Population (2011)
  - Total: 14,323

Languages
  - Official: Hindi
- Time zone: UTC+5:30 (IST)
- PIN: 825403
- Telephone code: 06550
- Vehicle registration: JH 13
- Lok Sabha constituency: Chatra
- Vidhan Sabha constituency: Chatra
- Website: chatra.nic.in

Jori Kalan is also known as Jori, is a small town in Chatra district in state of Jharkhand, India. The town is separated into two parts the one main town Jori Kalan and another part of the town is Jori Khurd.

== Introduction ==
Jori is located on the bank of river Lilajan also known as Falgu and all the sides of the town fortress with mountains. Town is scattered in radius of 5 kilometers and connecting too many villages around it.

== Civilians ==
According to census 2011 total number of households 1301 where 7711 people are residing out of them 4,057 are males and 3,654 are females, which represents poor Sex ratio in compare to other developed cities. Total 75.23% population of Jori is literate, percentage of literate male is 81.56% and female 68.04%. Where other of part of Jori, Jori Khurd is doing fabulous in literacy where 100% male and females are literate. The major issue civilians are facing are lack of employment, most of the educated youth are unemployed because there is no source of income and industrial development is yet too happen in this area. Major source of employment is Agriculture that is completely based on the monsoon.

== Tourism ==
=== Kali Mandir ===
Kali Mandir is a prominent Hindu temple in Jori which is famous for performing the ritual of marriage. Every year hundreds of Groom and Bride visit this temple to perform the ritual of marriage and bond themselves in the precious relation of husband and wife.

=== Kauleshwari Hill and Temple ===
Kauleshwari hill lies 5 km away in right direction of the town which is 1750 feet high from the sea level. On the top of the Kauleshwari hill there are Hindu temples of Goddess Kauleshwari, people said this temple is from ancient period and famous from vedic period.

=== Shri Digamber Jain Siddha Kshetra ===
This sacred site is believed to be where Lord Shitalnathji's Tapa and Gyan Kalyanaks took place. Some think it may be the 'Kotishila' mentioned in the Nirwaan Kund scripture. The place is also refer as Parasgiri Tirthkshetra, and located on Koluha Pahad near to Kuleswari Temple.

== Transportation ==
Transportation is good since it is located on NH 22 but only during the day hours, there is no transportation service during night. Nearest city is Gaya, Bihar which is 60 km away and other nearest city is Hazaribagh, Jharkhand which is 80 km away. Nearest Railway station is Gaya station code GAYA and nearest Airport is in Bodhgaya Airport (airport code: GAY) at distance of 50 km.

== Map ==
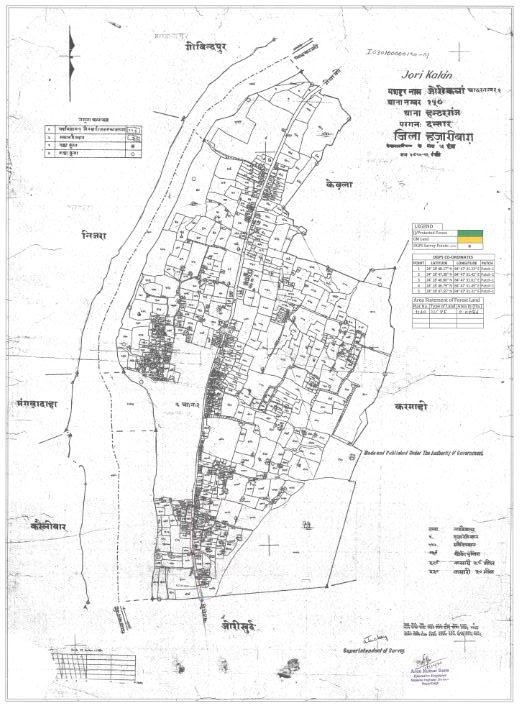
