= Agrahari Sikh =

Sikh community in India

The Agrahari Sikhs are a Sikh community found in Eastern India, including the states of West Bengal, Bihar and Jharkhand. Agrahari is a sub caste of Vaishya Bania caste and they have a common gotra, the Kashyap. Agrahari Sikhs and Punjabi Sikhs are two distinct ethno religious groups.

== History ==
Agrahari Sikhs have lived for centuries in Bihar and Jharkhand. In the presence of Guru Sahib, Agraharis adopted the Khalsa Panth for protecting their life and religion. Agrahari Sikhs are of non-Punjabi background.

Agrahari Sikhs are settled in Sasaram, Gaya in Bihar, Kolkata city of West Bengal, Dumari (Hunterganj), Kedli Chatti (of Jharkhand) and even other places of Bihar and Jharkhand. They are also found in some parts of Uttar Pradesh. Agrahari Sikhs maintain separate Sikh Temples in Bihar and West Bengal.
