= Phalgu River =

River in India

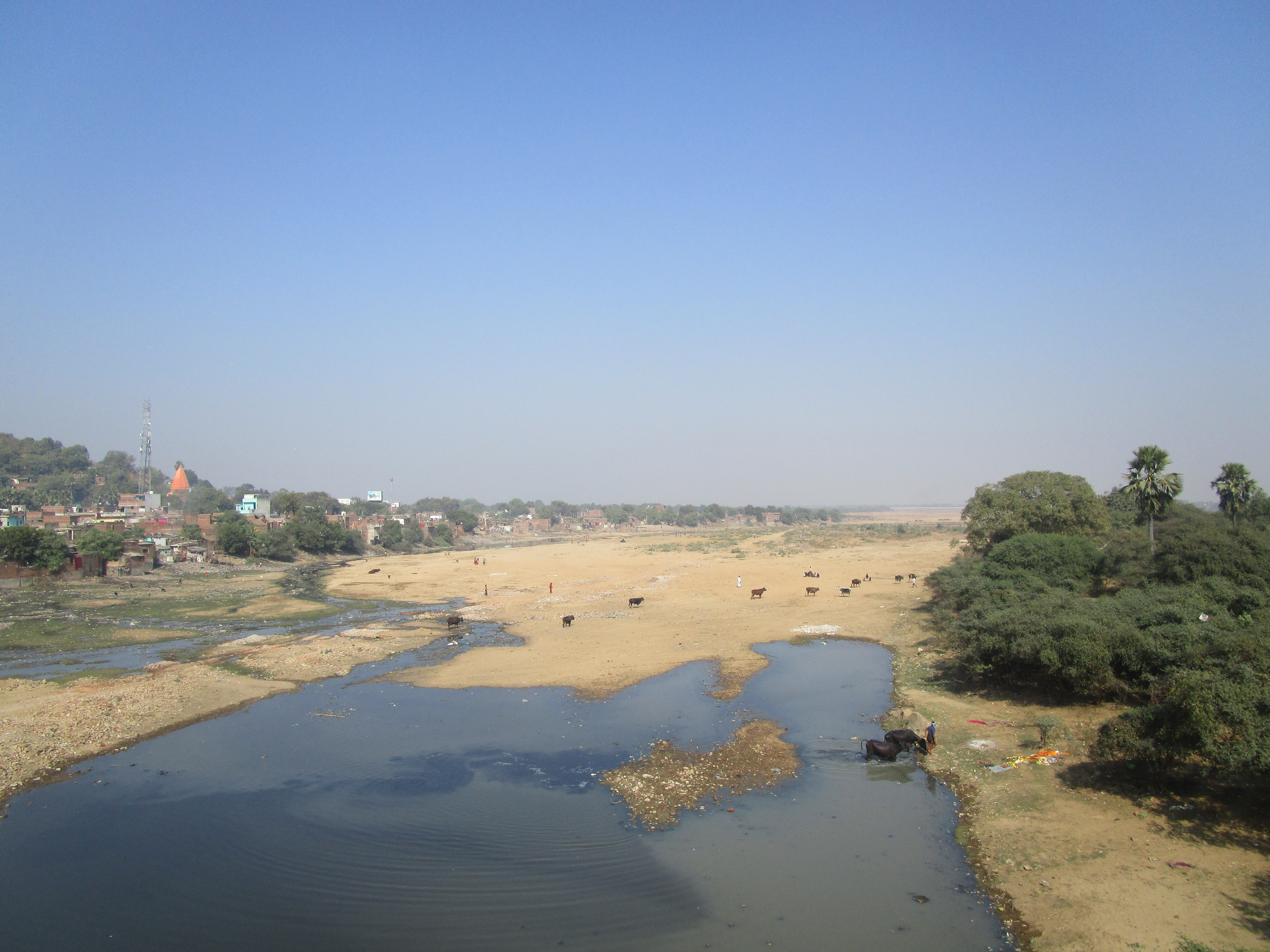
- Phalgu River at Gaya

Location
- Country: India
- State: Bihar, Jharkhand
- District: Gaya

Physical characteristics
- Source: Confluence of Lilajan and Mohana rivers
  - location: near Gaya
  - coordinates: 24°43′41″N 85°00′47″E
- Mouth: Punpun River

The Phalgu or Falgu, a river that flows past Gaya, India in the Indian state of Bihar, is a sacred river for Hindus and Buddhists.

In Hinduism, the river is regarded as the physical embodiment of Vishnu. Its banks, particularly near the iconic Vishnupad Mandir, serve as a major pilgrimage site for pindadaan (ancestral rites), especially during the annual Pitru Paksha period. According to the Ramayana, the river's subterranean course at Gaya is the result of a curse placed upon it by Sita.

In Buddhism, the Phalgu (historically known as the Niranjana) holds profound significance as the site where Gautama Buddha practiced asceticism prior to attaining enlightenment.

== Course ==
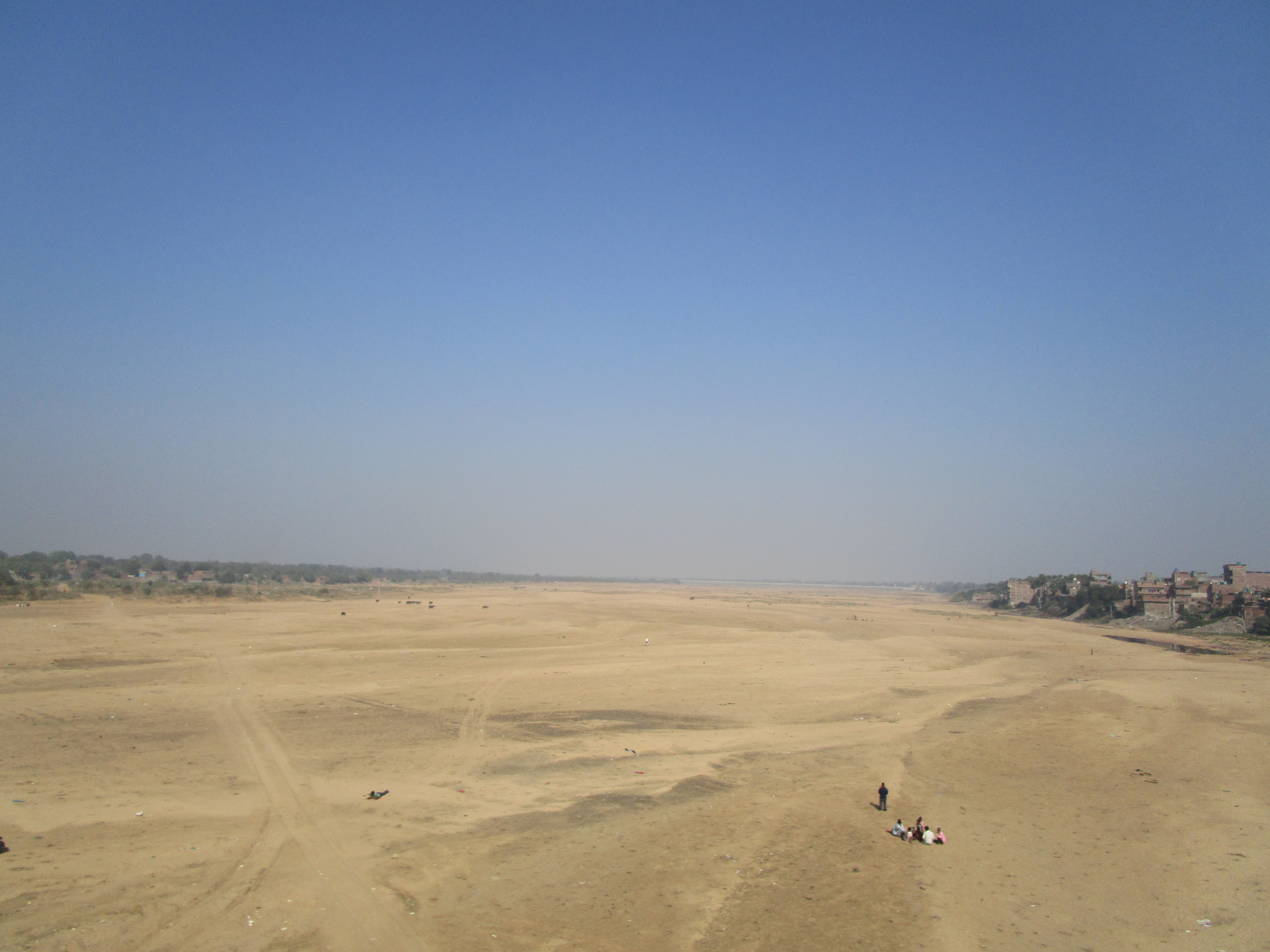
Phalgu River at Gaya in winter

The Phalgu is formed by the confluence, some 3 kilometres (2 mi) below Bodh Gaya, of the Lilajan (also called Niranjan or Nilanjan) and the Mohana, two large hill streams each of which is over 270 metres (300 yd) wide. The Phalgu is called the Niranjana in the'cRamayana'c. The united stream flows on to the north past the town of Gaya, where it attains a breadth of over 820 metres (900 yd). The Phalgu here passes by a high rocky bank, on the steep sides of which are many paved stairs leading down to the river bed, while high above are the Vishnupad Mandir, with many minor shrines around it. It then runs in a north-easterly direction for about 27 kilometres (17 mi), and opposite the Barabar hills it again takes the name of Mohana, and divides into two branches which eventually flow into a branch of the Punpun.

The Phalgu like its confluent streams, Lilajan and Mohana, is subject to high floods during the monsoons but in other seasons of the year it dwindles to a stream wandering through a wide expanse of sand.

== In Hinduism ==
According to the Ramayana, Rama, along with his brothers and Sita, came to Gaya to perform the sacred rites for his father, Dasharatha. When the brothers were bathing in the river, Sita was sitting on the banks, playing with the sand. Suddenly, Dasharatha appeared out of the sand and asked for the pinda (ancestral offering), saying he was hungry. Sita asked him to wait until his sons returned so she could give him the traditional pinda of rice and sesame seeds, but he refused to wait, asking her to give him offerings made of the sand in his hand. Having no other option, in the presence of five witnesses—the Akshayavat, the Phalgu River, a cow, a Tulsi plant, and a Brahmin—she gave him the pinda he desired. Soon, Rama returned and started the rituals, but when Dasharatha did not appear, Sita explained what had happened. When Rama expressed disbelief that his father would accept offerings made of sand, Sita asked her witnesses to tell him the truth. Only the Akshayavat took her side and told the truth, while the other four lied. In her anger, Sita cursed the Phalgu River henceforth to have no water at Gaya; the cow to no longer be worshipped from the front as all others are: only its backside would be worshipped; the Tulsi plant to no longer grow at Gaya; and the Gaya Brahmins to never be satisfied and always crave more. She then blessed the Akshayavat saying that all who came to Gaya would perform the pindadaan at the tree as well.

According to the Gaya Mahatmya, part of the Vayu Purana, the river is considered the physical embodiment of Vishnu himself. The text notes that the river sacredly flows past Gaya as a primary site where offerings must be made for the souls of ancestors. Local tradition recorded in Puranic lore also holds that the river formerly flowed with milk.

In modern Hindu belief, the soul wanders after death until pindadan, a religious service seeking salvation for the dead from the cycle of rebirth, is performed. The fortnight-long Pitru Paksha period—the 15 days of the waning moon during the Hindu month of Ashvin—is considered especially auspicious for this offering, traditionally performed on the banks of the Phalgu at Gaya. Hindu devotees offering pindadan traditionally shave their heads, take a holy dip in the river, and head for the Baitarni pond, with prayers performed at the Vishnupad Temple led by local priests known as Gayawal Pandas.
