= 2024 Indian general election in Jharkhand =

Election in Jharkhand, India

- 13 May - 01 June 2024

All 14 Jharkhand seats in the Lok Sabha
- Opinion polls
- Turnout: 66.77% (▼0.03%)
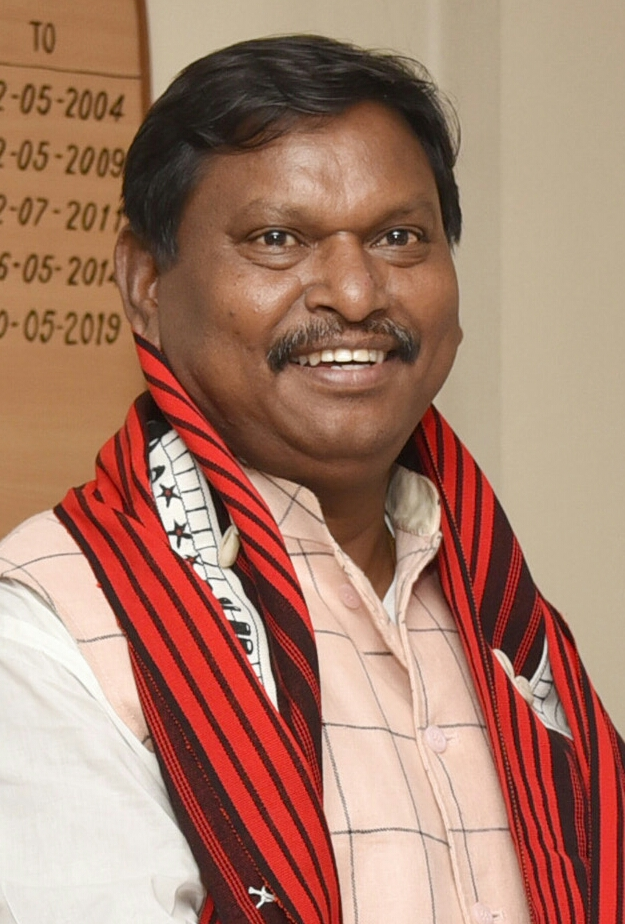

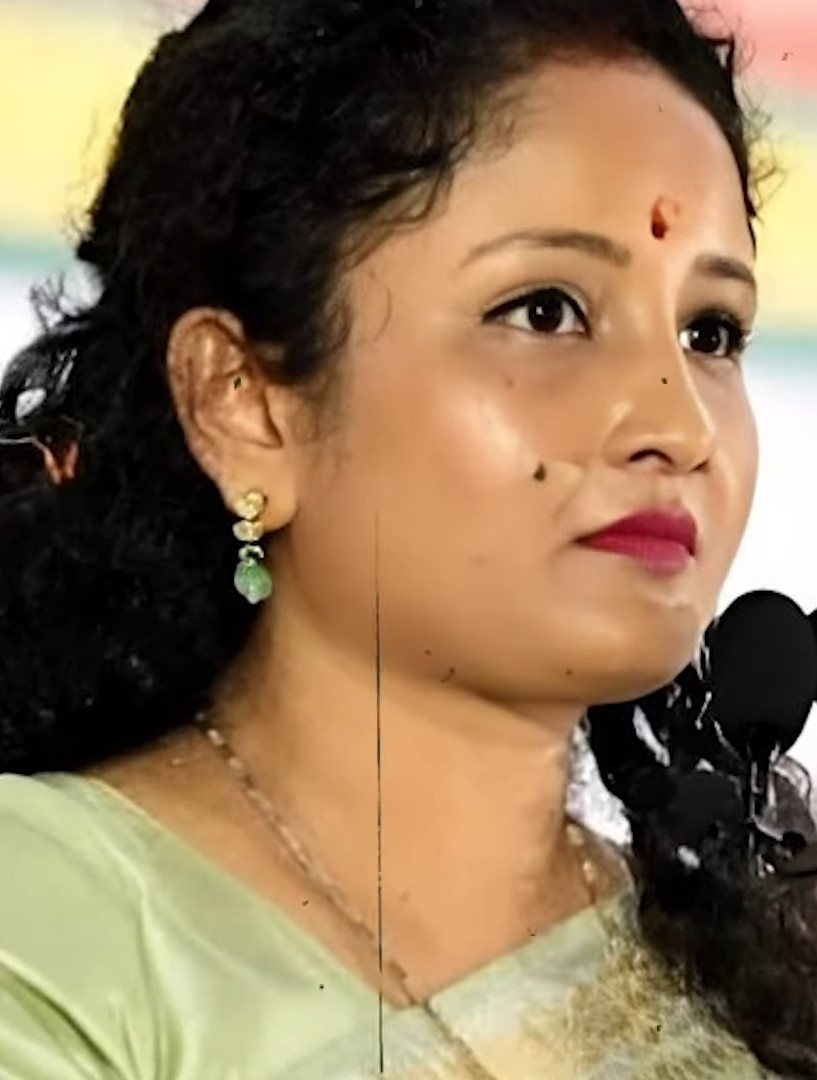
Leader	Arjun Munda	Kalpana Soren
Alliance	NDA	INDIA
Leader since	2019	2024
Leader's seat	Khunti (lost)	Did not contest
Last election	56.00%, 12 seats	34.58%, 2 seat
Seats won	9	5
Seat change	▼3	▲3
Popular vote	81,33,129	67,33,099
Percentage	47.17%	39.05%
Swing	▼8.78%	▲4.39%
Prime Minister before election
Narendra Modi
BJP
Prime Minister after election
Narendra Modi
BJP

The 2024 Indian general election was held in Jharkhand from 13 May 2024 to 1 June 2024 to elect 14 members of the 18th Lok Sabha.

== Election schedule ==
Phase wise schedule of 2024 Indian general election in Jharkhand

Poll event	Phase			
Poll event	IV	V	VI	VII
Notification date	18 April	26 April	29 April	7 May
Last date for filing nomination	25 April	3 May	6 May	14 May
Scrutiny of nomination	26 April	4 May	7 May	15 May
Last Date for withdrawal of nomination	29 April	6 May	9 May	17 May
Date of poll	13 May	20 May	25 May	1 June
Date of counting of votes/Result	4 June 2024			
No. of constituencies	4	3	4	3

== Parties and alliances ==
=== National Democratic Alliance ===
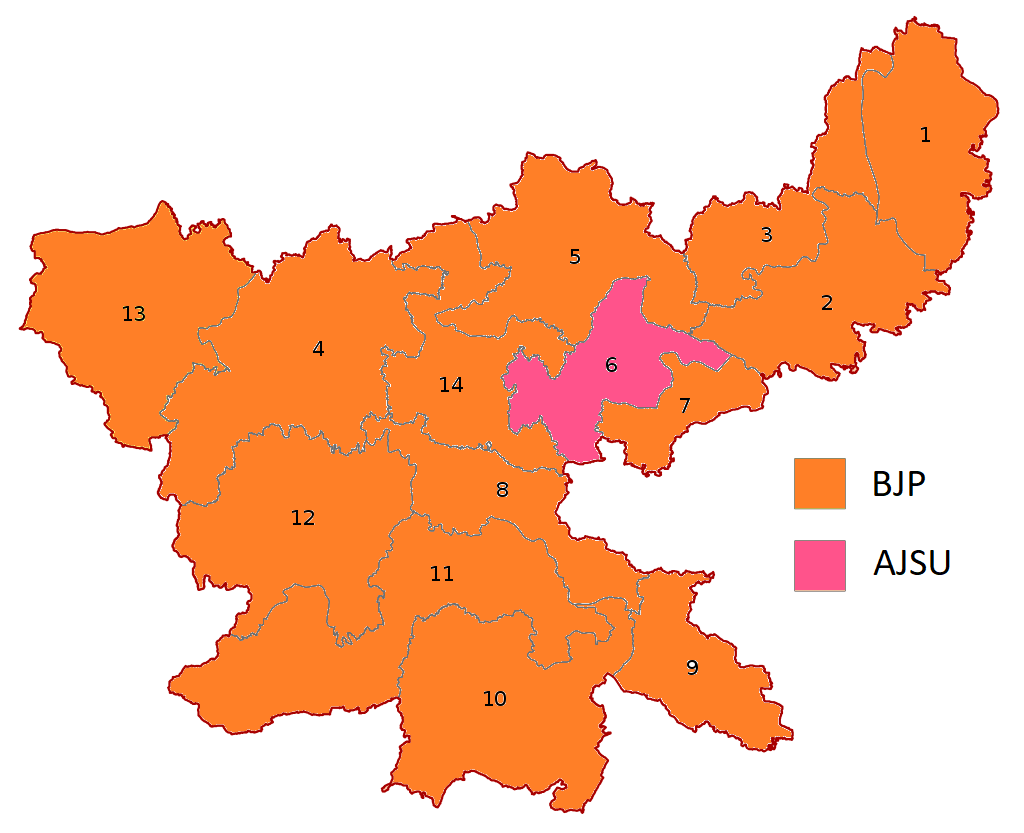
National Democratic Alliance

Party	Flag	Symbol	Leader	Seats contested
Bharatiya Janata Party			Arjun Munda	13
All Jharkhand Students Union			Sudesh Mahto	1
Total				14

=== Indian National Developmental Inclusive Alliance ===
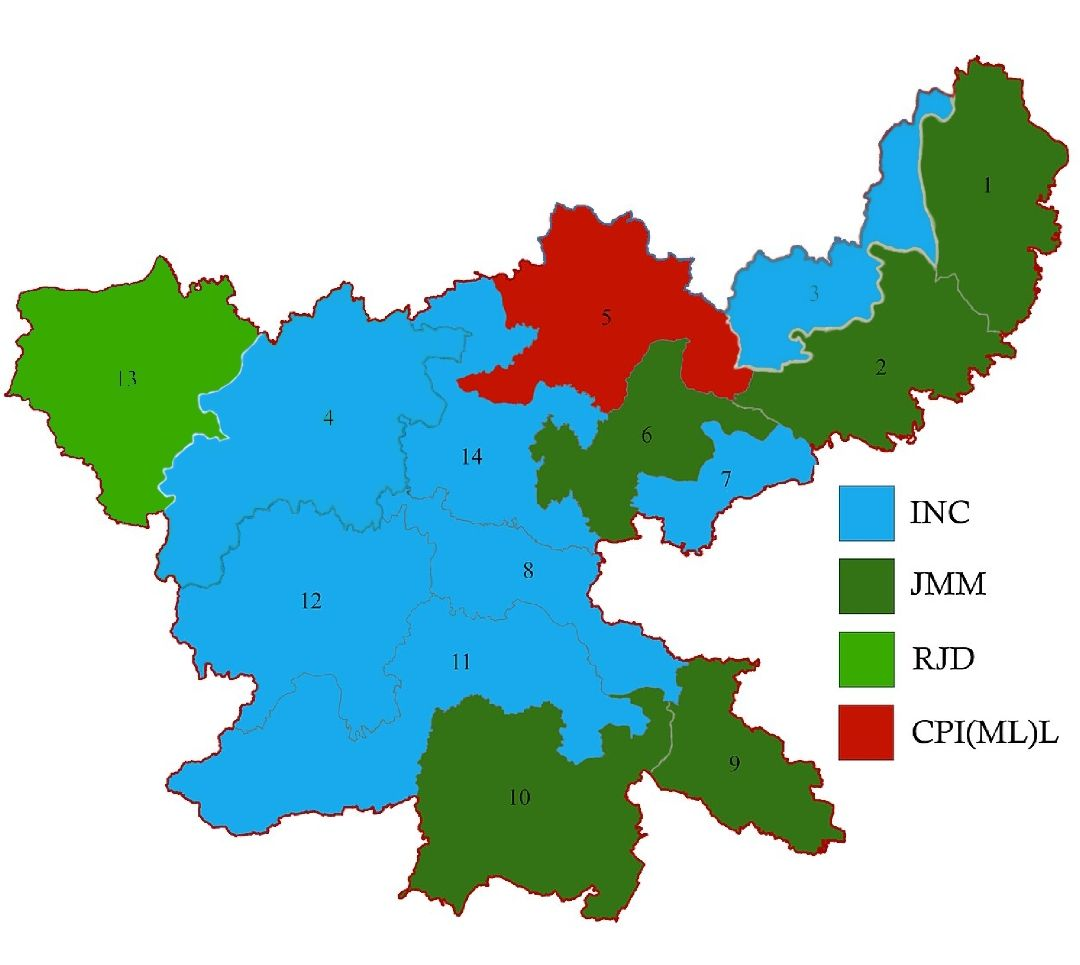
Indian National Developmental Inclusive Alliance

Party	Flag	Symbol	Leader	Seats contested
Indian National Congress			Rajesh Thakur	7
Jharkhand Mukti Morcha			Champai Soren	5
Communist Party of India (Marxist–Leninist) Liberation			Vinod Kumar Singh	1
Rashtriya Janata Dal			Abhay Kumar Singh	1
Total				14

=== Others ===
Party	Flag	Symbolic	Leader	Seats contested
Communist Party of India			Mahendra Pathak	4
Communist Party of India (Marxist)				1

== Candidates ==
Constituency		NDA		INDIA	
#	Name	Party	Candidate	Party	Candidate
1	Rajmahal (ST)	BJP	Tala Marandi	JMM	Vijay Kumar Hansdak
2	Dumka (ST)	BJP	Sita Soren	JMM	Nalin Soren
3	Godda	BJP	Nishikant Dubey	INC	Pradeep Yadav
4	Chatra	BJP	Kalicharan Singh	INC	Krishna Nand Tripathi
5	Kodarma	BJP	Annpurna Devi	CPI(ML)L	Vinod Kumar Singh
6	Giridih	AJSU	Chandra Prakash Ch.	JMM	Mathura Prasad Mahto
7	Dhanbad	BJP	Dulu Mahato	INC	Anupama Singh
8	Ranchi	BJP	Sanjay Seth	INC	Yashashwini Sahay
9	Jamshedpur	BJP	Bidyut Baran Mahato	JMM	Samir Mohanty
10	Singhbhum (ST)	BJP	Geeta Koda	JMM	Joba Majhi
11	Khunti (ST)	BJP	Arjun Munda	INC	Kalicharan Munda
12	Lohardaga (ST)	BJP	Sameer Oraon	INC	Sukhdeo Bhagat
13	Palamu (SC)	BJP	Vishnu Dayal Ram	RJD	Mamta Bhuiyan
14	Hazaribagh	BJP	Manish Jaiswal	INC	Jai Prakash Bhai Patel

== Surveys and polls ==
=== Opinion polls ===
Polling agency	Date published	Margin of error				Lead
Polling agency	Date published	Margin of error	NDA	INDIA	Others	Lead
ABP News-CVoter	March 2024	±5%	12	2	0	NDA
India TV-CNX	March 2024	±3%	13	1	0	NDA
India Today-CVoter	February 2024	±3-5%	12	2	0	NDA
Times Now-ETG	December 2023	±3%	11-13	1-3	0	NDA
India TV-CNX	October 2023	±3%	13	1	0	NDA
Times Now-ETG	September 2023	±3%	9-11	3-5	0	NDA
Times Now-ETG	August 2023	±3%	10-12	2-4	0	NDA

Polling agency	Date published	Margin of error				Lead
Polling agency	Date published	Margin of error	NDA	INDIA	Others	Lead
ABP News-CVoter	March 2024	±5%	52%	35%	13%	17
India Today-CVoter	February 2024	±3-5%	56%	30%	14%	26

=== Exit polls ===
Polling agency				Lead
Polling agency	NDA	INDIA	Others	Lead
TV9 Bharatvarsh- People's Insight - Polstrat	12	1	1	NDA
Actual results	9	5	0	NDA

== Voter turnout ==
=== Phase wise ===
Phase	Poll date	Constituencies	Voter turnout (%)
IV	13 May 2024	Singhbhum (ST), Khunti (ST), Lohardaga (ST), Palamu (SC)	66.01%
V	20 May 2024	Chatra, Kodarma, Hazaribagh	63.21%
VI	25 May 2024	Giridih, Dhanbad, Ranchi, Jamshedpur	65.39%
VII	1 June 2024	Rajmahal (ST), Dumka (ST), Godda	
Total			

=== Constituency wise ===
Constituency		Poll date	Turnout	Swing
1	Rajmahal (ST)	1 June 2024	70.78%	▼1.27%
2	Dumka (ST)	1 June 2024	73.87%	▲0.44%
3	Godda	1 June 2024	68.63%	▼0.94%
4	Chatra	20 May 2024	63.69%	▼1.28%
5	Kodarma	20 May 2024	61.81%	▼4.87%
6	Giridih	25 May 2024	67.23%	▲0.11%
7	Dhanbad	25 May 2024	62.06%	▲1.59%
8	Ranchi	25 May 2024	65.36%	▲0.87%
9	Jamshedpur	25 May 2024	67.68%	▲0.49%
10	Singhbhum (ST)	13 May 2024	69.32%	▲0.06%
11	Khunti (ST)	13 May 2024	69.93%	▲0.68%
12	Lohardaga (ST)	13 May 2024	66.45%	▲0.15%
13	Palamu (SC)	13 May 2024	61.27%	▼3.07%
14	Hazaribagh	20 May 2024	64.39%	▼0.46%

== Results ==
=== Results by alliance or party ===
Alliance/ Party		Popular vote			Seats		
Alliance/ Party		Votes	%	±pp	Contested	Won	+/−
NDA	BJP	76,81,990	44.60	▼7.00	13	8	▼3
NDA	AJSU	4,51,139	2.62	▼1.78	1	1	Steady
NDA	Total	81,33,129	47.22	▼8.78	14	9	▼3
INDIA	INC	33,19,345	19.19	▲3.39	7	2	▲1
INDIA	JMM	25,17,556	14.60	▲2.90	5	3	▲2
INDIA	RJD	4,81,555	2.77	▼0.33	1	0	Steady
INDIA	CPI(M-L)L	4,14,643	2.41	▼1.91	1	0	Steady
INDIA	Total	67,33,099	38.97	▲4.39	14	5	▲3
Others		6,28,519	3.65	▲0.28	114	0	Steady
IND		15,51,763	9.00	▲4.80	102	0	Steady
NOTA		1,95,472	1.13	▼0.13			
Total		1,72,41,982	100%	Steady	244	14	Steady
Votes Cast		1,72,41,982	66.74%				
Total Electors		2,58,33,046					

=== Results by constituency ===
Constituency		Poll%	Winner				Runner Up				Margin	%
#	Name	Poll%	Candidate	Party	Votes	%	Candidate	Party	Votes	%	Margin	%
1	Rajmahal (ST)	70.78% ▼	Vijay Kumar Hansdak	JMM	6,13,371	50.35%	Tala Marandi	BJP	4,35,107	35.72%	1,78,264	14.63%
2	Dumka (ST)	73.87% ▲	Nalin Soren	JMM	5,47,370	46.23%	Sita Soren	BJP	5,24,843	44.32%	22,527	1.91%
3	Godda	68.63% ▼	Nishikant Dubey	BJP	6,93,140	49.57%	Pradeep Yadav	INC	5,91,327	42.29%	1,01,813	7.28%
4	Chatra	63.69%▼	Kalicharan Singh	BJP	5,74,556	52.89%	Krishna Nand Tripathi	INC	3,53,597	32.55%	2,20,959	20.34%
5	Kodarma	61.81%▼	Annpurna Devi	BJP	7,91,657	57.79%	Vinod Kumar Singh	CPI(M-L)L	4,14,643	30.27%	3,77,014	27.52%
6	Giridih	67.23% ▲	Chandra Prakash Ch.	AJSU	4,51,139	35.67%	Mathura Prasad Mahto	JMM	3,70,259	29.27%	80,880	6.40%
7	Dhanbad	62.06% ▲	Dulu Mahato	BJP	7,89,172	55.26%	Anupama Singh	INC	4,57,589	32.04%	3,31,583	23.22%
8	Ranchi	65.36% ▲	Sanjay Seth	BJP	6,64,732	45.91%	Yashashwini Sahay	INC	5,44,220	37.59%	1,20,512	8.32%
9	Jamshedpur	67.68% ▲	Bidyut Baran Mahato	BJP	7,26,174	56.84%	Samir Mohanty	JMM	4,66,392	36.5%	2,59,782	20.34%
10	Singhbhum (ST)	69.32% ▲	Joba Majhi	JMM	5,20,164	51.62%	Geeta Koda	BJP	3,51,762	34.91%	1,68,402	16.71%
11	Khunti (ST)	69.93% ▲	Kali Charan Munda	INC	5,11,647	54.62%	Arjun Munda	BJP	3,61,972	38.64%	1,49,675	15.98%
12	Lohardaga (ST)	66.45% ▲	Sukhdeo Bhagat	INC	4,83,038	49.95%	Sameer Oraon	BJP	3,43,900	35.56%	1,39,138	14.39%
13	Palamu (SC)	61.27% ▼	Vishnu Dayal Ram	BJP	7,70,362	55.39%	Mamta Bhuiyan	RJD	4,81,555	34.63%	2,88,807	20.76%
14	Hazaribagh	64.39% ▼	Manish Jaiswal	BJP	6,54,163	51.76%	Jai Prakash Bhai Patel	INC	3,77,927	29.88%	2,76,686	21.88%

=== Assembly segments wise lead of Parties ===
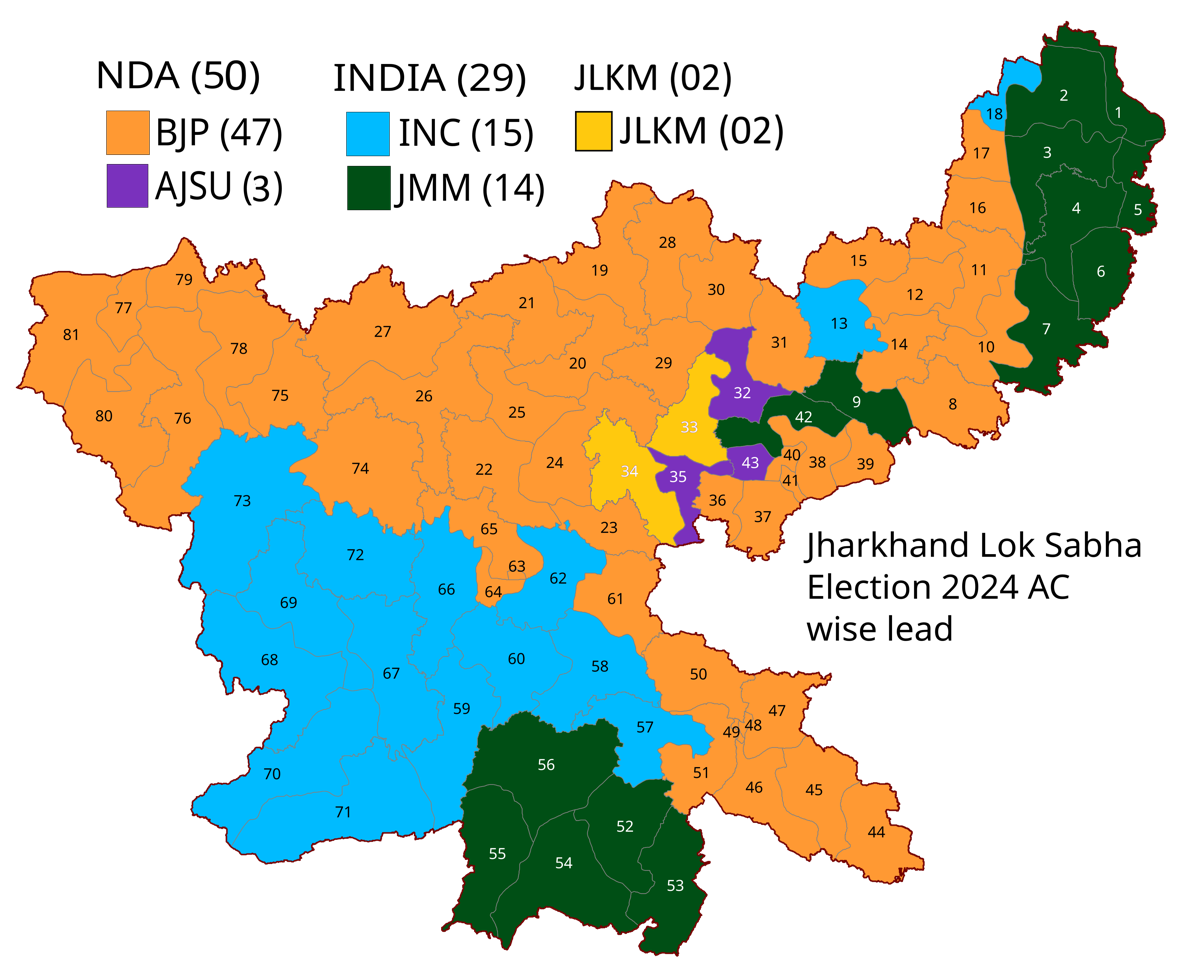
Assembly wise leads for NDA, INDIA and JLKM in lok sabha 2024 Jharkhand

Party		Assembly segments	Current Position in the Assembly (as of 2024 election)
NDA	BJP	47	21
NDA	AJSU	3	1
NDA	JD(U)	(Note: Did Not Contest)	1
NDA	LJP(RV)	(Note: Did Not Contest)	1
NDA	Total	50	24
INDIA	INC	15	16
INDIA	JMM	14	34
INDIA	RJD	0	4
INDIA	CPI(ML)L	0	2
INDIA	Total	29	56
JLKM	JLKM	2	1
JLKM	Total	2	1

=== Assembly Segment wise leads ===
Constituency		Winner				Runner Up				Margin
#	Name	Candidate	Party	Votes	%	Candidate	Party	Votes	%	Margin
1-Rajmahal (ST) Lok Sabha constituency
1	Rajmahal	Vijay Hansdak	JMM	1,09,642	46.07	Tala Marandi	BJP	1,06,045	44.55	3,597
2	Borio (ST)	Vijay Hansdak	JMM	77,537	41.29	Tala Marandi	BJP	74,876	39.87	2,661
3	Barhait (ST)	Vijay Hansdak	JMM	76,068	48.39	Tala Marandi	BJP	52,629	33.48	23,439
4	Litipara (ST)	Vijay Hansdak	JMM	80,348	49.50	Tala Marandi	BJP	54,970	33.87	25,378
5	Pakur	Vijay Hansdak	JMM	1,59,343	58.23	Tala Marandi	BJP	80,557	29.44	78,786
6	Maheshpur (ST)	Vijay Hansdak	JMM	1,04,355	55.58	Tala Marandi	BJP	61,467	32.74	42,888
2-Dumka (ST) Lok Sabha constituency
7	Sikaripara (ST)	Nalin Soren	JMM	87,980	51.88	Sita Soren	BJP	62,639	36.94	25,341
8	Nala	Sita Soren	BJP	95,700	49.93	Nalin Soren	JMM	74,041	38.63	21,659
9	Jamtara	Nalin Soren	JMM	1,26,013	53.84	Sita Soren	BJP	90,859	38.82	35,154
10	Dumka (ST)	Sita Soren	BJP	89,211	48.94	Nalin Soren	JMM	78,778	43.22	10,433
11	Jama (ST)	Sita Soren	BJP	74,932	46.01	Nalin Soren	JMM	69,246	42.52	5,686
14	Sarath	Sita Soren	BJP	1,07,373	45.84	Nalin Soren	JMM	1,06,241	45.36	1,132
3-Godda Lok Sabha constituency
12	Jarmundi	Nishikant Dubey	BJP	1,07,082	56.82	Pradeep Yadav	INC	62,684	33.26	44,398
13	Madhupur	Pradeep Yadav	INC	1,28,833	48.16	Nishikant Dubey	BJP	1,19,956	44.84	8,877
15	Deoghar (SC)	Nishikant Dubey	BJP	1,53,449	52.84	Pradeep Yadav	INC	1,11,711	38.46	41,738
16	Poreyahat	Nishikant Dubey	BJP	1,01,676	47.20	Pradeep Yadav	INC	93,136	43.24	8,540
17	Godda	Nishikant Dubey	BJP	1,07,698	50.53	Pradeep Yadav	INC	90,601	42.51	17,097
18	Mahagama	Pradeep Yadav	INC	99,139	46.41	Nishikant Dubey	BJP	99,018	46.36	121
4-Chatra Lok Sabha constituency
26	Simaria (SC)	Kalicharan Singh	BJP	1,40,884	57.95	Krishna Nand Tripathi	INC	66,271	27.26	74,613
27	Chatra (SC)	Kalicharan Singh	BJP	1,43,867	54.64	Krishna Nand Tripathi	INC	76,022	28.87	67,845
73	Manika (ST)	Krishna Nand Tripathi	INC	72,045	43.30	Kalicharan Singh	BJP	70,459	42.35	1,586
74	Latehar (SC)	Kalicharan Singh	BJP	96,840	47.36	Krishna Nand Tripathi	INC	79,579	38.92	17,261
75	Panki	Kalicharan Singh	BJP	1,16,862	59.28	Krishna Nand Tripathi	INC	54,193	27.49	62,669
5-Kodarma Lok Sabha constituency
19	Kodarma	Annpurna Devi	BJP	1,59,250	64.48	Vinod Singh	CPI(ML)L	62,141	25.16	97,109
20	Barkatha	Annpurna Devi	BJP	1,52,750	65.22	Vinod Singh	CPI(ML)L	55,874	23.86	96,876
28	Dhanwar	Annpurna Devi	BJP	1,17,425	54.20	Vinod Singh	CPI(ML)L	73,338	33.85	44,087
29	Bagodar	Annpurna Devi	BJP	1,35,480	56.01	Vinod Singh	CPI(ML)L	76,229	31.52	59,251
30	Jamua (SC)	Annpurna Devi	BJP	1,15,578	56.71	Vinod Singh	CPI(ML)L	61,112	29.98	54,466
31	Gandey	Annpurna Devi	BJP	1,06,702	49.11	Vinod Singh	CPI(ML)L	82,251	37.86	24,451
6-Giridih Lok Sabha constituency
32	Giridih	CP Choudhary	AJSU	86,901	44.39	Mathura Mahto	JMM	72,082	36.82	14,819
33	Dumri	Jairam Mahato	JLKM	90,541	41.97	CP Choudhary	AJSU	55,421	25.69	35,120
34	Gomia	Jairam Mahato	JLKM	70,828	33.00	CP Choudhary	AJSU	66,488	30.97	4,340
35	Bermo	CP Choudhary	AJSU	84,651	39.96	Mathura Mahto	JMM	59,183	27.94	25,468
42	Tundi	Mathura Mahto	JMM	73,771	32.99	CP Choudhary	AJSU	72,838	32.57	933
43	Baghmara	CP Choudhary	AJSU	81,597	42.64	Mathura Mahto	JMM	51,140	26.72	30,457
7-Dhanbad Lok Sabha constituency
36	Bokaro	Dulu Mahato	BJP	1,67,044	55.53	Anupama Singh	INC	1,02,141	33.95	64,903
37	Chandankiyari (SC)	Dulu Mahato	BJP	1,00,177	49.79	Anupama Singh	INC	43,717	21.73	56,460
38	Sindri	Dulu Mahato	BJP	1,28,476	49.97	Anupama Singh	INC	87,239	33.93	41,237
39	Nirsa	Dulu Mahato	BJP	1,39,319	59.73	Anupama Singh	INC	70,979	30.43	68,340
40	Dhanbad	Dulu Mahato	BJP	1,51,379	58.96	Anupama Singh	INC	89,412	34.82	61,967
41	Jharia	Dulu Mahato	BJP	96,028	57.98	Anupama Singh	INC	58,870	35.55	37,158
8-Ranchi Lok Sabha constituency
50	Ichagarh	Sanjay Seth	BJP	96,724	43.78	Yashaswini Sahay	INC	58,784	26.61	37,940
61	Silli	Sanjay Seth	BJP	57,281	34.82	Devendra Mahto	JLKM	49,362	30.00	7,919
62	Khijri (ST)	Yashaswini Sahay	INC	1,13,868	44.88	Sanjay Seth	BJP	97,535	38.45	16,333
63	Ranchi	Sanjay Seth	BJP	1,11,678	56.45	Yashaswini Sahay	INC	80,854	40.87	30,824
64	Hatia	Sanjay Seth	BJP	1,56,593	52.18	Yashaswini Sahay	INC	1,30,023	43.32	26,570
65	Kanke (SC)	Sanjay Seth	BJP	1,39,164	47.05	Yashaswini Sahay	INC	1,19,271	40.33	19,893
9-Jamshedpur Lok Sabha constituency
44	Baharagora	Bidyut Mahto	BJP	1,01,784	53.84	Samir Mohanty	JMM	71,959	38.06	29,825
45	Ghatsila (ST)	Bidyut Mahto	BJP	88,047	46.37	Samir Mohanty	JMM	87,252	45.96	795
46	Potka (ST)	Bidyut Mahto	BJP	1,11,554	49.02	Samir Mohanty	JMM	99,507	43.73	12,047
47	Jugasalai (SC)	Bidyut Mahto	BJP	1,39,852	56.83	Samir Mohanty	JMM	83,093	33.77	56,759
48	Jamshedpur East	Bidyut Mahto	BJP	1,45,482	75.12	Samir Mohanty	JMM	40,712	21.02	1,04,770
49	Jamshedpur West	Bidyut Mahto	BJP	1,33,172	61.08	Samir Mohanty	JMM	77,474	35.54	55,698
10-Singhbhum (ST) Lok Sabha constituency
51	Seraikella (ST)	Geeta Koda	BJP	1,18,773	45.45	Joba Manjhi	JMM	98,488	37.69	20,285
52	Chaibasa (ST)	Joba Manjhi	JMM	1,04,833	63.15	Geeta Koda	BJP	45,338	27.31	59,495
53	Majhgaon (ST)	Joba Manjhi	JMM	95,164	62.46	Geeta Koda	BJP	35,171	23.09	59,993
54	Jaganathpur (ST)	Joba Manjhi	JMM	70,082	50.62	Geeta Koda	BJP	49,105	35.47	20,977
55	Manoharpur (ST)	Joba Manjhi	JMM	76,263	53.68	Geeta Koda	BJP	48,587	34.20	27,676
56	Chakardharpur (ST)	Joba Manjhi	JMM	71,159	50.95	Geeta Koda	BJP	52,032	37.26	19,127
11-Khunti (ST) Lok Sabha constituency
57	Kharsawan (ST)	Kalicharan Munda	INC	89,910	50.97	Arjun Munda	BJP	74,960	42.49	14,950
58	Tamar (ST)	Kalicharan Munda	INC	75,786	48.29	Arjun Munda	BJP	69,798	44.48	5,988
59	Torpa (ST)	Kalicharan Munda	INC	79,260	59.75	Arjun Munda	BJP	43,840	33.05	35,420
60	Khunti (ST)	Kalicharan Munda	INC	96,399	62.30	Arjun Munda	BJP	48,804	31.54	47,595
70	Simbdega (ST)	Kalicharan Munda	INC	81,691	50.14	Arjun Munda	BJP	72,273	44.36	9,418
71	Kolebira (ST)	Kalicharan Munda	INC	80,951	57.38	Arjun Munda	BJP	48,401	34.31	32,550
12-Lohardaga (ST) Lok Sabha constituency
66	Mandar (ST)	Sukhdeo Bhagat	INC	1,31,383	52.65	Samir Oraon	BJP	82,466	33.05	48,917
67	Sisai (ST)	Sukhdeo Bhagat	INC	88,282	51.67	Samir Oraon	BJP	62,288	36.45	25,994
68	Gumla (ST)	Sukhdeo Bhagat	INC	81,242	51.32	Samir Oraon	BJP	61,799	39.04	19,443
69	Bishunpur (ST)	Sukhdeo Bhagat	INC	77,895	43.72	Samir Oraon	BJP	63,076	35.41	14,819
72	Lohardaga (ST)	Sukhdeo Bhagat	INC	97,310	49.18	Samir Oraon	BJP	70,056	35.41	27,254
13-Palamu (SC) Lok Sabha constituency
76	Daltonganj	Vishnu Dayal Ram	BJP	1,55,023	62.42	Mamta Bhuiyan	RJD	72,747	29.29	82,276
77	Bishrampur	Vishnu Dayal Ram	BJP	1,19,685	56.76	Mamta Bhuiyan	RJD	69,188	32.81	50,497
78	Chhatarpur (SC)	Vishnu Dayal Ram	BJP	95,985	50.48	Mamta Bhuiyan	RJD	71,382	37.54	24,603
79	Hussainabad	Vishnu Dayal Ram	BJP	88,445	50.24	Mamta Bhuiyan	RJD	68,972	39.18	19,473
80	Garhwa	Vishnu Dayal Ram	BJP	1,50,077	55.94	Mamta Bhuiyan	RJD	92,415	34.45	57,662
81	Bhawnathpur	Vishnu Dayal Ram	BJP	1,53,075	54.67	Mamta Bhuiyan	RJD	98,964	35.34	54,111
14-Hazaribagh Lok Sabha constituency
21	Barhi	Manish Jaiswal	BJP	1,33,167	64.26	Jai Prakash Patel	INC	51,988	25.09	81,179
22	Barkagaon	Manish Jaiswal	BJP	1,33,579	52.23	Jai Prakash Patel	INC	74,548	29.15	59,031
23	Ramgarh	Manish Jaiswal	BJP	1,08,110	43.33	Jai Prakash Patel	INC	70,517	28.26	37,593
24	Mandu	Manish Jaiswal	BJP	1,18,677	43.01	Jai Prakash Patel	INC	86,609	31.39	32,068
25	Hazaribagh	Manish Jaiswal	BJP	1,53,883	59.04	Jai Prakash Patel	INC	87,799	33.76	65,904

== See also ==
- 2024 Indian general election in Karnataka
- 2024 Indian general election in Kerala
- 2024 Indian general election in Ladakh
