= 2019 Indian general election in Jharkhand =

Indian lower house election in Jharkhand

- 29 April 2019; 6,12,19 May 2019

14 seats
- Turnout: 66.80% (▲2.98%)
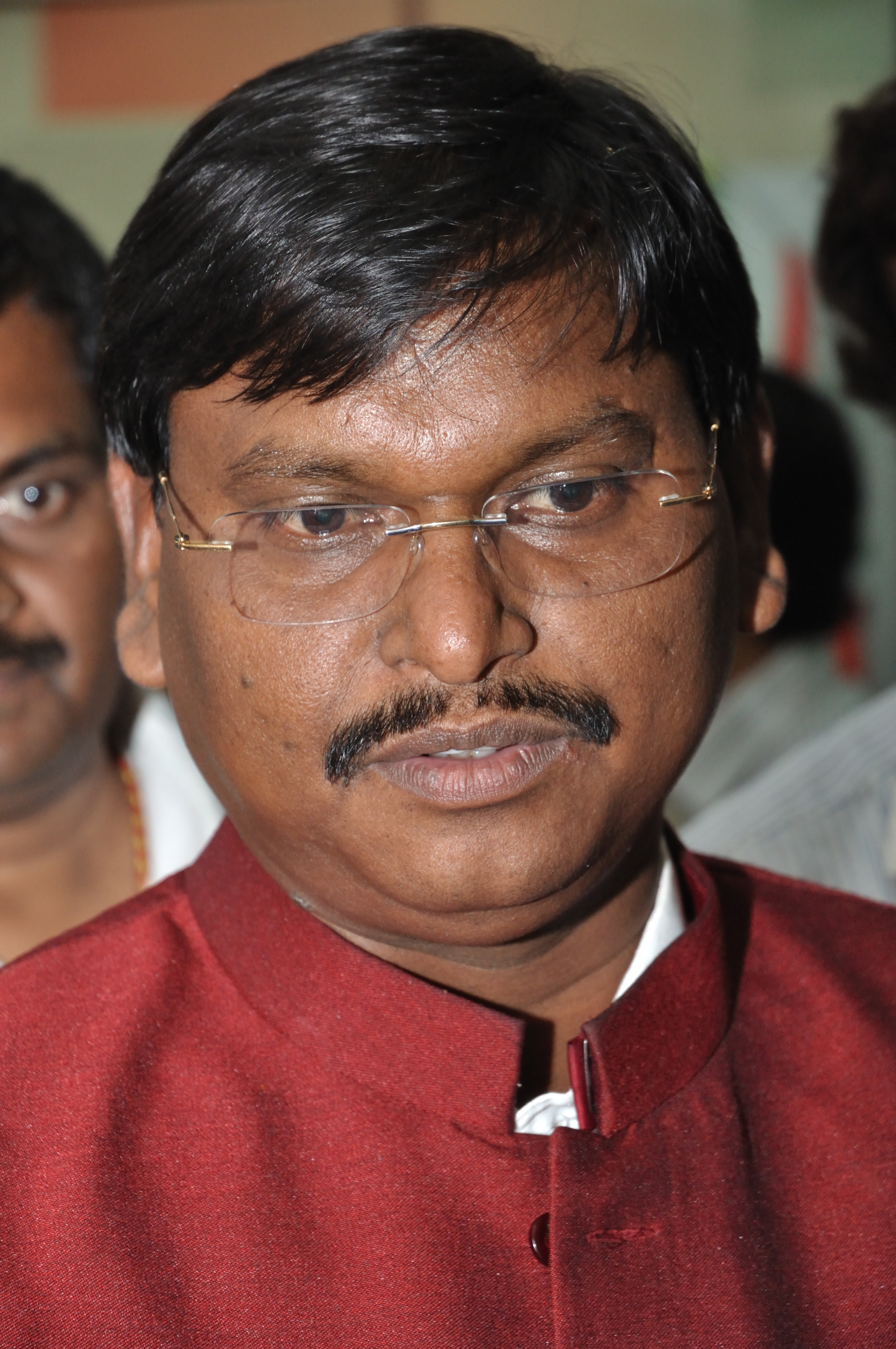

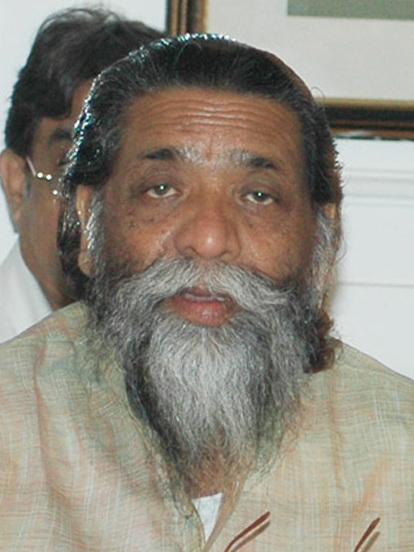
Leader	Arjun Munda	Shibu Soren
Alliance	NDA	UPA
Leader's seat	Khunti (won)	Dumka (lost)
Last election	12	2
Seats won	12	2
Seat change	Steady	Steady
Percentage	56.00%	34.58%
Swing	▲12.20%	▼1.72%
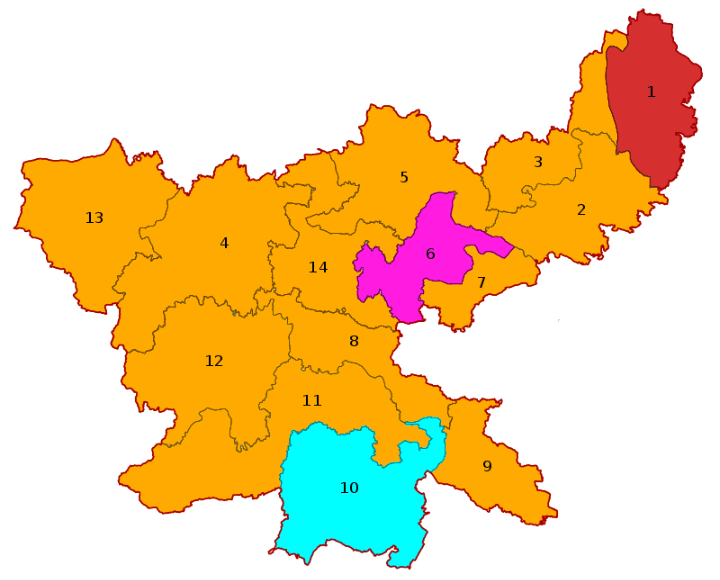
- Jharkhand
Prime Minister before election
Narendra Modi
BJP
Prime Minister after election
Narendra Modi
BJP

The 2019 Indian general elections were held in India between 29 April to 19 May 2019 to constitute the 17th Lok Sabha.

== Parties and alliances ==
Alliance	Party	Flag	Symbol	Leader	Seats contested
NDA	Bharatiya Janata Party			Arjun Munda	13
NDA	All Jharkhand Students Union			Sudesh Mahato	1
UPA	Indian National Congress			Alamgir Alam	7
UPA	Jharkhand Mukti Morcha			Shibu Soren	4
UPA	Jharkhand Vikas Morcha			Babulal Marandi	2
UPA	Rashtriya Janata Dal			Lalu Prasad Yadav	1

== Candidates ==
Constituency		NDA		UPA	
No.	Name	Party	Candidate	Party	Candidate
1	Rajmahal (ST)	BJP	Hemlal Murmu	JMM	Vijay Hansdak
2	Dumka (ST)	BJP	Sunil Soren	JMM	Shibu Soren
3	Godda	BJP	Nishikant Dubey	JVM(P)	Pradeep Yadav
4	Chatra	BJP	Sunil Kumar Singh	INC	Manoj Kumar Yadav
5	Kodarma	BJP	Annapurna Devi Yadav	JVM(P)	Babulal Marandi
6	Giridih	AJSU	Chandra Prakash Chaudhary	JMM	Jagarnath Mahto
7	Dhanbad	BJP	Pashupati Nath Singh	INC	Kirti Azad
8	Ranchi	BJP	Sanjay Seth	INC	Subodh Kant Sahay
9	Jamshedpur	BJP	Bidyut Baran Mahato	JMM	Champai Soren
10	Singhbhum (ST)	BJP	Laxman Giluwa	INC	Geeta Koda
11	Khunti (ST)	BJP	Arjun Munda	INC	Kali Charan Munda
12	Lohardaga (ST)	BJP	Sudarshan Bhagat	INC	Sukhdeo Bhagat
13	Palamau (SC)	BJP	Vishnu Dayal Ram	RJD	Ghuran Ram
14	Hazaribagh	BJP	Jayant Sinha	INC	Gopal Sahu

== Opinion polling ==
Date published	Polling agency			Lead
Date published	Polling agency	NDA	UPA	Lead
9 April 2019	Times Now - VMR	11	3	8
8 April 2019	News Nation	9	5	4
6 April 2019	India TV - CNX	10	4	6
5 April 2019	Jan Ki Baat	9-11	3-5	6-8
30 March 2019	VDP Associates	7	7	–
24 Jan 2019	Republic TV - Cvoter	5	9	4
05 Jan 2019	VDP Associates	4	10	6

Date published	Polling agency					Lead
Date published	Polling agency	NDA	UPA	JMM	JVM	Lead
Jan 2019	Republic TV - Cvoter	41.9%	46.5%		10.1%	4.6%

== Results ==
Alliance / Party		Popular vote			Seats		
Alliance / Party		Votes	%	±pp	Contested	Won	+/−
NDA	BJP	76,23,987	50.96	▲10.86	13	11	▼1
NDA	AJSU	6,48,277	4.33	▲0.53	1	1	▲1
NDA	Total	82,72,264	55.29	Steady	14	12	Steady
UPA	INC	23,38,466	15.63	▲2.13	7	1	▲1
UPA	JMM	17,22,635	11.51	▲2.11	4	1	▼1
UPA	JVM(P)	7,50,799	5.02	▼7.28	2	0	Steady
UPA	RJD	3,61,478	2.42	▲0.72	1 + 1	0	Steady
UPA	Total	51,73,378	34.58	Steady	14 + 1	2	Steady
Others		7,05,704	4.71	Steady	105	0	Steady
IND		6,21,247	4.15	Steady	95	0	Steady
NOTA		1,89,365	1.27	Steady			
Total		1,49,61,958	100%	-	243	14	-

== Results by Constituency ==
Constituency		Winner				Runner Up				Margin	%
#	Name	Candidate	Party	Votes	%	Candidate	Party	Votes	%	Margin	%
1	Rajmahal	Vijay Kumar Hansdak	JMM	507,830	48.46	Hemlal Murmu	BJP	408,635	39.00	99,195	9.46
2	Dumka	Sunil Soren	BJP	484,923	47.26	Shibu Soren	JMM	437,333	42.63	47,590	4.63
3	Godda	Nishikant Dubey	BJP	637,610	53.39	Pradeep Yadav	JVM	453,383	37.96	184,227	15.43
4	Chatra	Sunil Kumar Singh	BJP	528,077	57.03	Manoj Yadav	INC	150,206	16.22	377,871	40.81
5	Kodarma	Annpurna Devi	BJP	753,016	62.25	Babulal Marandi	JVM	297,416	24.59	455,600	37.66
6	Giridih	Chandra Prakash	AJSU	648,277	58.55	Jagarnath Mahto	JMM	399,930	36.12	248,347	22.43
7	Dhanbad	Pashupati Nath Singh	BJP	827,234	66.01	Kirti Azad	INC	341,040	27.21	486,194	38.80
8	Ranchi	Sanjay Seth	BJP	706,510	57.18	Subodh Sahay	INC	423,730	34.29	282,780	22.89
9	Jamshedpur	Bidyut Baran Mahato	BJP	679,632	59.39	Champai Soren	JMM	377,542	32.99	302,090	26.40
10	Singhbhum	Geeta Koda	INC	431,815	49.10	Laxman Giluwa	BJP	359,660	40.89	72,155	8.21
11	Khunti	Arjun Munda	BJP	382,638	45.94	Kali Charan Munda	INC	381,193	45.77	1,445	0.17
12	Lohardaga	Sudarshan Bhagat	BJP	371,595	45.41	Sukhdeo Bhagat	INC	361,232	44.14	10,363	1.27
13	Palamau	Vishnu Dayal Ram	BJP	755,659	62.43	Ghuran Ram	RJD	278,053	22.97	477,606	39.46
14	Hazaribagh	Jayant Sinha	BJP	728,798	67.40	Gopal Ps. Sahu	INC	249,250	23.05	479,548	44.35

== Assembly segments wise lead of parties ==
Party	Assembly segments	Position in Assembly (as of 2014& 2019 election)
Bharatiya Janata Party	57	25
Indian National Congress	11	16
Jharkhand Mukti Morcha	7	30
All Jharkhand Students Union	6	2
Others	–	8
Total	81	

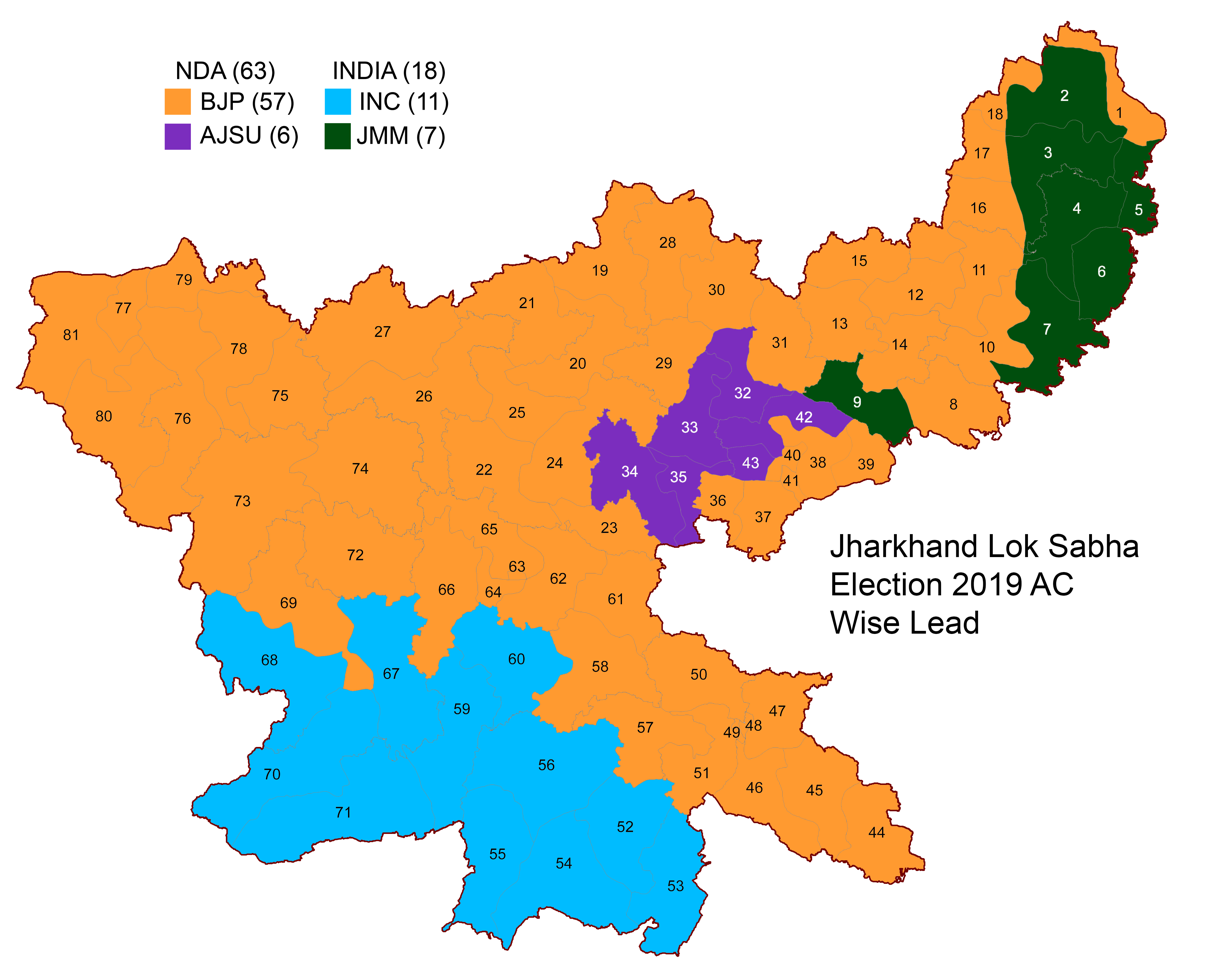
Jharkhand Lok Sabha Election 2019 AC Wise Lead

== Post-election Union Council of Ministers from Jharkhand ==
#	Name	Constituency	Designation	Department	From	To	Party
1	Arjun Munda	Khunti	Cabinet Minister	Ministry of Tribal Affairs	31 May 2019	9 June 2024	BJP
1	Arjun Munda	Khunti	Cabinet Minister	Ministry of Agriculture and Farmers' Welfare	7 Dec 2023	9 June 2024	BJP
2	Mukhtar Abbas Naqvi	Rajya Sabha	Cabinet Minister	Ministry of Minority Affairs	31 May 2019	6 July 2022	BJP
3	Annpurna Devi	Kodarma	MoS	Ministry of Education	7 July 2021	9 June 2024	BJP

=== Assembly Segment wise leads ===
Constituency		Winner				Runner Up				Margin
#	Name	Candidate	Party	Votes	%	Candidate	Party	Votes	%	Margin
1-Rajmahal (ST) Lok Sabha constituency
1	Rajmahal	Hemlal Murmu	BJP	1,03,062	51.73	Vijay Hansdak	JMM	80,262	40.29	22,800
2	Borio (ST)	Vijay Hansdak	JMM	76,301	45.76	Hemlal Murmu	BJP	65,307	39.17	10,994
3	Barhait (ST)	Vijay Hansdak	JMM	62,921	45.72	Hemlal Murmu	BJP	49,299	35.82	13,622
4	Litipara (ST)	Vijay Hansdak	JMM	71,504	48.97	Hemlal Murmu	BJP	55,035	37.69	16,469
5	Pakur	Vijay Hansdak	JMM	1,25,966	54.83	Hemlal Murmu	BJP	76,771	33.41	49,195
6	Maheshpur (ST)	Vijay Hansdak	JMM	89,635	54.01	Hemlal Murmu	BJP	58,212	35.08	31,423
2-Dumka (ST) Lok Sabha constituency
7	Sikaripara (ST)	Shibu Soren	JMM	70,614	47.13	Sunil Soren	BJP	61,774	41.23	8,840
8	Nala	Sunil Soren	BJP	91,121	53.63	Shibu Soren	JMM	57,271	33.71	33,850
9	Jamtara	Shibu Soren	JMM	98,519	50.00	Sunil Soren	BJP	82,530	41.89	15,989
10	Dumka (ST)	Sunil Soren	BJP	78,623	48.86	Shibu Soren	JMM	68,758	42.73	9,865
11	Jama (ST)	Sunil Soren	BJP	68,527	47.03	Shibu Soren	JMM	60,573	41.57	7,954
14	Sarath	Sunil Soren	BJP	1,01,173	50.55	Shibu Soren	JMM	80,423	40.18	20,750
3-Godda Lok Sabha constituency
12	Jarmundi	Nishikant Dubey	BJP	95,683	60.05	Pradeep Yadav	JVM(P)	45,780	28.73	49,903
13	Madhupur	Nishikant Dubey	BJP	1,08,663	48.73	Pradeep Yadav	JVM(P)	95,882	43.00	12,781
15	Deoghar (SC)	Nishikant Dubey	BJP	1,50,786	61.01	Pradeep Yadav	JVM(P)	75,000	30.35	75,786
16	Poreyahat	Nishikant Dubey	BJP	90,841	48.53	Pradeep Yadav	JVM(P)	78,277	41.82	12,564
17	Godda	Nishikant Dubey	BJP	98,285	52.97	Pradeep Yadav	JVM(P)	74,455	40.12	23,830
18	Mahagama	Nishikant Dubey	BJP	91,125	48.80	Pradeep Yadav	JVM(P)	81,283	43.53	9,842
4-Chatra Lok Sabha constituency
26	Simaria (SC)	Sunil Kumar Singh	BJP	1,31,092	63.21	Manoj Yadav	INC	31,083	14.99	1,00,009
27	Chatra (SC)	Sunil Kumar Singh	BJP	1,26,172	56.62	Shubhash Yadav	RJD	36,022	16.17	90,150
73	Manika (ST)	Sunil Kumar Singh	BJP	63,935	43.60	Manoj Yadav	INC	38,120	25.99	25,815
74	Latehar (SC)	Sunil Kumar Singh	BJP	94,995	53.69	Manoj Yadav	INC	41,506	23.46	5,489
75	Panki	Sunil Kumar Singh	BJP	1,10,011	65.27	Manoj Yadav	INC	20,051	11.90	89,960
5-Kodarma Lok Sabha constituency
19	Kodarma	Annapurna Devi	BJP	1,58,413	72.84	Babu Lal Marandi	JVM(P)	41,734	19.19	1,16,679
20	Barkatha	Annapurna Devi	BJP	1,56,068	72.62	Babu Lal Marandi	JVM(P)	38,765	18.04	1,17,303
28	Dhanwar	Annapurna Devi	BJP	95,279	49.40	Babu Lal Marandi	JVM(P)	62,164	32.23	33,115
29	Bagodar	Annapurna Devi	BJP	1,34,909	63.46	Raj Kumar Yadav	CPI(ML)L	34,225	16.10	1,00,684
30	Jamua (SC)	Annapurna Devi	BJP	1,15,733	62.16	Babu Lal Marandi	JVM(P)	51,064	27.43	64,669
31	Gandey	Annapurna Devi	BJP	91,594	49.72	Babu Lal Marandi	JVM(P)	77,024	41.81	14,570
6-Giridih Lok Sabha constituency
32	Giridih	CP Choudhary	AJSU	95,248	55.75	Jagarnath Mahto	JMM	65,293	38.21	29,955
33	Dumri	CP Choudhary	AJSU	1,08,877	56.90	Jagarnath Mahto	JMM	71,173	37.20	37,704
34	Gomia	CP Choudhary	AJSU	1,18,477	62.87	Jagarnath Mahto	JMM	60,389	32.05	58,088
35	Bermo	CP Choudhary	AJSU	1,12,971	58.84	Jagarnath Mahto	JMM	70,522	36.73	42,449
42	Tundi	CP Choudhary	AJSU	1,06,737	55.71	Jagarnath Mahto	JMM	74,099	38.68	32,638
43	Baghmara	CP Choudhary	AJSU	1,04,555	61.69	Jagarnath Mahto	JMM	56,792	33.51	47,763
7-Dhanbad Lok Sabha constituency
36	Bokaro	Pasupati Nath Singh	BJP	1,81,699	67.34	Kirti Azad	INC	74,758	27.70	1,06,941
37	Chandankiyari (SC)	Pasupati Nath Singh	BJP	1,24,601	71.90	Kirti Azad	INC	32,806	18.93	91,795
38	Sindri	Pasupati Nath Singh	BJP	1,37,740	62.27	Kirti Azad	INC	67,163	30.37	70,577
39	Nirsa	Pasupati Nath Singh	BJP	1,41,013	68.75	Kirti Azad	INC	48,867	23.82	92,146
40	Dhanbad	Pasupati Nath Singh	BJP	1,48,300	63.86	Kirti Azad	INC	71,366	30.73	76,934
41	Jharia	Pasupati Nath Singh	BJP	91,351	61.93	Kirti Azad	INC	45,181	30.63	46,170
8-Ranchi Lok Sabha constituency
50	Ichagarh	Sanjay Seth	BJP	1,18,211	62.04	Subodh Kant Sahay	INC	49,337	25.89	68,874
61	Silli	Sanjay Seth	BJP	86,765	60.43	Subodh Kant Sahay	INC	36,174	25.19	50,591
62	Khijri (ST)	Sanjay Seth	BJP	1,04,871	48.29	Subodh Kant Sahay	INC	85,272	39.26	19,599
63	Ranchi	Sanjay Seth	BJP	1,02,217	57.55	Subodh Kant Sahay	INC	71,408	40.20	30,809
64	Hatia	Sanjay Seth	BJP	1,44,728	57.77	Subodh Kant Sahay	INC	95,278	38.03	49,450
65	Kanke (SC)	Sanjay Seth	BJP	1,47,191	58.53	Subodh Kant Sahay	INC	85,131	33.85	62,060
9-Jamshedpur Lok Sabha constituency
44	Baharagora	Bidyut Baran Mahato	BJP	93,275	54.00	Champai Soren	JMM	62,009	35.90	31,266
45	Ghatsila (ST)	Bidyut Baran Mahato	BJP	87,087	49.00	Champai Soren	JMM	73,298	41.24	13,789
46	Potka (ST)	Bidyut Baran Mahato	BJP	1,07,090	52.47	Champai Soren	JMM	80,118	39.25	26,972
47	Jugsalai (SC)	Bidyut Baran Mahato	BJP	1,35,421	61.03	Champai Soren	JMM	66,774	30.09	68,647
48	Jamshedpur East	Bidyut Baran Mahato	BJP	1,34,317	76.89	Champai Soren	JMM	32,762	18.76	1,01,555
49	Jamshedpur West	Bidyut Baran Mahato	BJP	1,21,794	63.39	Champai Soren	JMM	62,391	32.47	59,403
10-Singhbhum (ST) Lok Sabha constituency
51	Seraikella (ST)	Laxman Giluwa	BJP	1,40,603	60.55	Geeta Koda	INC	77,644	33.44	62,959
52	Chaibassa (ST)	Geeta Koda	INC	91,678	63.61	Laxman Giluwa	BJP	37,982	26.35	53,696
53	Majhgaon (ST)	Geeta Koda	INC	88,418	66.26	Laxman Giluwa	BJP	29,092	21.80	59,326
54	Jaganathpur (ST)	Geeta Koda	INC	57,056	47.61	Laxman Giluwa	BJP	44,148	36.84	12,908
55	Manoharpur (ST)	Geeta Koda	INC	58,264	46.49	Laxman Giluwa	BJP	52,152	41.61	6,112
56	Chakardharpur (ST)	Geeta Koda	INC	58,485	47.34	Laxman Giluwa	BJP	55,182	44.66	3,303
11-Khunti (ST) Lok Sabha constituency
57	Kharsawan (ST)	Arjun Munda	BJP	88,852	56.61	Kali Charan Munda	INC	55,971	35.66	32,881
58	Tamar (ST)	Arjun Munda	BJP	86,352	60.58	Kali Charan Munda	INC	44,871	31.48	41,481
59	Torpa (ST)	Kali Charan Munda	INC	65,122	54.38	Arjun Munda	BJP	43,964	36.71	21,158
60	Khunti (ST)	Kali Charan Munda	INC	72,812	53.97	Arjun Munda	BJP	51,410	38.11	21,402
70	Simbdega (ST)	Kali Charan Munda	INC	71,894	48.24	Arjun Munda	BJP	66,122	44.37	5,772
71	Kolebira (ST)	Kali Charan Munda	INC	69,798	54.87	Arjun Munda	BJP	44,866	35.27	24,932
12-Lohardaga (ST) Lok Sabha constituency
66	Mandar (ST)	Sudarshan Bhagat	BJP	91,442	44.69	Sukhdeo Bhagat	INC	90,254	44.11	1,188
67	Sisai (ST)	Sukhdeo Bhagat	INC	71,978	48.83	Sudarshan Bhagat	BJP	61,504	41.72	10,474
68	Gumla (ST)	Sukhdeo Bhagat	INC	69,313	48.37	Sudarshan Bhagat	BJP	62,628	43.71	6,685
69	Bishunpur (ST)	Sudarshan Bhagat	BJP	73,255	48.57	Sukhdeo Bhagat	INC	59,946	39.75	13,309
72	Lohardaga (ST)	Sudarshan Bhagat	BJP	80,698	48.11	Sukhdeo Bhagat	INC	68,577	40.88	12,121
13-Palamu (SC) Lok Sabha constituency
76	Daltonganj	Vishnu Dayal Ram	BJP	1,45,935	67.66	Ghurand Ram	RJD	46,842	21.72	99,093
77	Bishrampur	Vishnu Dayal Ram	BJP	1,18,583	63.11	Ghurand Ram	RJD	39,379	20.96	79,204
78	Chattarpur (SC)	Vishnu Dayal Ram	BJP	1,00,126	59.98	Ghurand Ram	RJD	39,565	23.70	60,561
79	Hussainabad	Vishnu Dayal Ram	BJP	94,858	60.22	Ghurand Ram	RJD	39,410	25.02	55,448
80	Garhwa	Vishnu Dayal Ram	BJP	1,37,947	58.57	Ghurand Ram	RJD	60,694	25.77	77,253
81	Bhawanathpur	Vishnu Dayal Ram	BJP	1,55,791	64.03	Ghurand Ram	RJD	51,077	20.99	1,04,714
14-Hazaribagh Lok Sabha constituency
21	Barhi	Jayant Sinha	BJP	1,24,120	69.15	Gopal Prasad Sahu	INC	36,837	20.52	87,283
22	Barkagaon	Jayant Sinha	BJP	1,43,197	66.87	Gopal Prasad Sahu	INC	47,064	21.98	96,133
23	Ramgarh	Jayant Sinha	BJP	1,49,018	69.19	Gopal Prasad Sahu	INC	49,700	23.08	99,318
24	Mandu	Jayant Sinha	BJP	1,58,989	65.69	Gopal Prasad Sahu	INC	55,442	22.91	1,03,547
25	Hazaribagh	Jayant Sinha	BJP	1,52,035	66.65	Gopal Prasad Sahu	INC	59,979	26.30	92,056
