= Singhbhum Lok Sabha constituency =

Constituency of the Indian parliament in Jharkhand

Coordinates: 22.47°N 85.47°E

Singhbhum JH-10
- Lok Sabha constituency
- Interactive map of Singhbhum Lok Sabha constituency

Constituency details
- Country: India
- Region: East India
- State: Jharkhand
- Assembly constituencies: Seraikella; Chaibasa; Majhgaon; Jaganathpur; Manoharpur; Chakradharpur
- Established: 1957
- Reservation: ST

Member of Parliament
- 18th Lok Sabha
- Incumbent Joba Majhi
- Party: JMM
- Alliance: INDIA
- Elected year: 2024
- Preceded by: Geeta Koda

Singhbhum Lok Sabha constituency is one of the 14 Lok Sabha (parliamentary) constituencies in Jharkhand state in eastern India. This constituency is reserved for the candidates belonging to the Scheduled tribes. This constituency covers the entire West Singhbhum district and part of Seraikela Kharsawan district.

== Assembly segments ==
Singhbhum Lok Sabha constituency comprises the following six Vidhan Sabha (legislative assembly) segments:

#	Name	District	Member	Party	2024 Lead
51	Seraikella (ST)	Seraikela Kharsawan	Champai Soren	BJP	BJP
52	Chaibasa (ST)	West Singhbhum	Deepak Birua	JMM	JMM
53	Majhgaon (ST)	West Singhbhum	Niral Purty	JMM	JMM
54	Jaganathpur (ST)	West Singhbhum	Sona Ram Sinku	INC	JMM
55	Manoharpur (ST)	West Singhbhum	Jagat Majhi	JMM	JMM
56	Chakradharpur (ST)	West Singhbhum	Sukhram Oraon	JMM	JMM

== Members of Parliament ==
Year	Winner	Party
1957	Shambhu Charan Godsora	Jharkhand Party
1962	Hari Charan Soy	Jharkhand Party
1967	Kolai Birua	Jharkhand Party
1971	Moran Singh Purty	Jharkhand Party
1977	Bagun Sumbrui	Jharkhand Party
1980	Bagun Sumbrui	Indian National Congress (I)
1984	Bagun Sumbrui	Indian National Congress
1989	Bagun Sumbrui	Indian National Congress
1991	Krishna Marandi	Jharkhand Mukti Morcha
1996	Chitrasen Sinku	Bharatiya Janata Party
1998	Vijay Singh Soy	Indian National Congress
1999	Laxman Giluwa	Bharatiya Janata Party
2004	Bagun Sumbrui	Indian National Congress
2009	Madhu Koda	Independent
2014	Laxman Giluwa	Bharatiya Janata Party
2019	Geeta Koda	Indian National Congress
2024	Joba Majhi	Jharkhand Mukti Morcha

== Election results ==
=== 2024 ===
2024 Indian general election: Singhbhum
Party	Candidate	Votes	%	±%
JMM	Joba Majhi	520,164	51.62	
BJP	Geeta Koda	3,51,762	34.91	
Independent	Damodar Singh Hansda	44,292	4.40	
NOTA	None of the above	23,982	2.38	
Majority		1,68,402	16.71	
Turnout		10,11,759	69.80	
JMM gain from INC		Swing		

=== 2019 ===
2019 Indian general elections: Singhbhum
Party	Candidate	Votes	%	±%
INC	Geeta Koda	431,815	49.11	
BJP	Laxman Giluwa	3,59,660	40.90	
NOTA	None of the above	24,270	2.76	
Majority		72,155	8.21	
Turnout		8,79,516	69.26	+0.26
INC gain from BJP		Swing		

=== 2014 ===
2014 Indian general elections: Singhbhum
Party	Candidate	Votes	%	±%
BJP	Laxman Giluwa	3,03,131	38.11	
JBSP	Geeta Koda	2,15,607	27.11	
INC	Chitrasen Sinku	1,11,796	14.06	
JVM(P)	Dashrath Gagrai	35,681	4.49	
JDP	Salkhan Murmu	25,547	3.21	
NOTA	None of the Above	27,037	3.40	
Majority		87,524	11.00	
Turnout		7,95,352	69.00	
BJP gain from Independent		Swing		

=== 2009 ===
2009 Indian general elections: Singhbhum
Party	Candidate	Votes	%	±%
Independent	Madhu Koda	2,56,827	44.14	
BJP	Barkuwar Gagrai	1,67,154	28.73	
INC	Bagun Sumbrui	95,604	16.43	
Majority		89,673	15.46	
Turnout		5,81,827	60.77	
Independent gain from INC		Swing		

== See also ==
- West Singhbhum district
- List of constituencies of the Lok Sabha
