= Vijay Singh Soy =

Indian politician

Member of Parliament, Lok Sabha
- In office 1998–1999
- Preceded by: Chitrasen Sinku
- Succeeded by: Laxman Giluwa
- Constituency: Singhbhum

Personal details
- Born: 11 November 1956 (age 69) Pindki, Singhbhum district, Bihar (Presently Jharkhand, India)
- Party: Indian National Congress
- Spouse: Kuni Soy

Vijay Singh Soy was an Indian politician. He was a Member of Parliament, representing Singhbhum in the Lok Sabha the lower house of India's Parliament as a member of the Indian National Congress
