= Deodhar, Majhgaon (Jharkhand) =

Village in West Singhbhum

Deodhar ଦେଓଧର
- Village
- Location within Jharkhand Location within Odisha Location within India
- Coordinates: 22.1087273°N 85.9840498°E
- Country: India
- State: Official: Jharkhand, Particular: Odisha
- Official District: Paschimi Singhbhum (West Singhbhum), Jharkhand
- Elevation: 244 m (801 ft)

Population (2011)
  - Total: 395
  - Estimate (2027): 495

Languages
  - Official: Hindi, Ho, Oriya
- Time zone: UTC+5:30 (IST)

Deodhar is a Village in Majhgaon Subdivision of West Singhbhum district of Jharkhand. It lies in Budha Rana Range. It has population of 395 people according to the 2011 census.
