= Bagun Sumbrai =

Indian politician (1924–2018)

Bagun Sumbrui

Member of Parliament, Lok Sabha
- In office 23 March 1977 — 28 November 1989
- Preceded by: Moran Singh Purty
- Succeeded by: Krishna Marandi
- Constituency: West Singhbhum
- In office 16 May 2004 — 16 May 2009
- Preceded by: Laxman Giluwa
- Succeeded by: Madhu Koda
- Constituency: West Singhbhum

Personal details
- Born: 24 February 1924 West Singhbhum, Jharkhand, British India
- Died: 22 June 2018 (aged 94) Jamshedpur, Jharkhand, India
- Party: Jharkhand Party; Indian National Congress
- Spouse: Anita Kumari
- Children: 4 sons

Bagun Sumbrui (24 February 1924 – 22 June 2018) was an Indian politician and a former member of the 14th Lok Sabha. He represented the Singhbhum constituency of Jharkhand, and was a member of the Indian National Congress (INC) political party.

== Profile ==
Position Held

1967–69 Member, Bihar Legislative Assembly

1967–68 Member, Public Accounts Committee, Bihar Legislative Assembly Member, Bihar Legislative Assembly (2nd term)

1969–72 Minister, Forests Production, Transport, Welfare and Sports, Government of Bihar

1972–77 Member, Bihar Legislative Assembly (3rd term), Member, S.T., S.C. and B.C. Welfare Committee

1977–79 Re-elected to 6th Lok Sabha

1980-84 Re-elected to 7th Lok Sabha (2nd term)

1989–91 Elected to 9th Lok Sabha (4th term)

1990 Member, Committee on Papers Laid on the Table

1984–89 Re-elected to 8th Lok Sabha (3rd term)

2000 Member, Committee on the Welfare of Scheduled Castes and Scheduled Tribes Member, Bihar & Jharkhand Legislative Assembly (4th term) Member, Consultative Committee, Ministry of Labour and Welfare Cabinet Minister for Tribal Welfare, Government of Bihar

2002–04 Member, Jharkhan Legislative Assembly Deputy Speaker, Jharkhand Legislative Assembly Member, Committee on Rural Development Member, Committee on Papers Laid on the Table

2004 Re-elected to 14th Lok Sabha (5th term) Member, Committee on Public Undertakings Acting Speaker, Jharkhand Legislative Assembly Member, Committee on Coal

== Other information ==
President, All India Jharkhand Party 1968–79; Member, (i) Working Committee, Janata Party, Bihar, 1979-March 1980; and (ii) Working Committee, Bharatiya Janata Party, Bihar

Sumbrai died on 22 June 2018 at the age of 94 in Jamshedpur.
