= Moran Singh Purty =

Indian politician (born 1934)

Member of Parliament, Lok Sabha
- In office 1971–1977
- Preceded by: Kolai Birua
- Succeeded by: Bagun Sumbrai
- Constituency: Singhbhum, Bihar

Personal details
- Born: 8 January 1934 Barukuti, Kuida, Singhbhum district, Bihar, British India (present-day Jharkhand, India)
- Party: Jharkhand Party

Moran Singh Purty (born 8 January 1934) is an Indian politician. He was a Member of Parliament, representing Singhbhum, Bihar in the Lok Sabha the lower house of India's Parliament as a member of the Jharkhand Party.
