= Baliaposi =

Baliaposi Baliyaposi, Balliaposi
- Village
- Interactive map of Baliaposi
- Location within Jharkhand Location within India Location within Asia
- Coordinates: 22°07′18″N 85°47′00″E
- Country: India
- State: Jharkhand
- District: West Singhbhum estate

Area
  - Total: 5.43 km^{2} (2.10 sq mi)
- Elevation: 413 m (1,355 ft)

Population (2011)
  - Total: 1,789
  - Density: 329/km^{2} (853/sq mi)

Languages
  - Official: Hindi, Ho, Odia
- Time zone: UTC+5:30 (Indian Standard Time)
- PIN: 833214
- Vehicle registration: JH-06
- Website: chaibasa.nic.in

Baliaposi (also known as Baliyaposi, Balliaposi) [Odia Pronunciation: Βαλιγιαποσι] is a village located in West Singhbhum district of Jharkhand, India. It has population of 1,789 in 364 households according to the 2011 Census.

== Geography ==
Baliaposi is surrounded by many villages. At north, it is bordered by Tirilpi and Barmita, At north-west it is bordered by Bichaburu. On West it is bordered by Regudsai. At south it is bordered by Khairpal(Koyo) and Sadomsoya and At east it is bordered by Gurgawn.

The elevation is 413m (1,355ft).

== Demographics ==
As per 2011 census, Baliaposi has a population of 1,789 (making up 2.46% of the Majhgaon Subdivision's population, 0.11908105898938% of the West Singhbhum's population) with 862 being males and 927 being females. The children population is 306, making 17.1% of the population.

=== Literacy ===
The average literacy is 50.78%, both lower than 66.41% state average and that 72.98% of national average. Male literacy is 63.27% and Female Literacy is 38.76%.

=== Castes ===
Type of Castes in Baliaposi:
1. Scheduled Castes 17 (0.95%)
2. Scheduled Tribes 1,147 (64.1%)
3. Non Indigenous 625 (34.9%)
Source: Census of India

As per 2011 census, Baliaposi has a scheduled tribes population of 1,147 people and the non-indigenous Population are 625. The Scheduled Castes is 17.

=== Projection ===
Projection 2011 - 2036*
Year	Population
2011	1,789 (-%)
2012	1,824 (+1.95%)
2013	1,750 (−4.05%)
2014	1,848 (+5.60%)
2015	1,900 (+2.81%)
2016	1,925 (+1.31%)
2017	1,932 (+0.36%)
2018	2,025 (+4.81%)
2019	2,025 (-%)
2020	2,098 (+3.60%)
2021	2,117 (+0.90%)
2022	2,137 (+0.94%)
2023	2,245 (+5.05%)
2024	2,365 (+5.34%)
2025	2,360 (−0.21%)
2026	2,400 (+1.69%)
2036	3,642 (+51.75%)
