= Sanlisia =

Sanlisia is a village in the Tonto CD block of West Singhbhum district, in Jharkhand, India.As of 2011 census, Talaburuwith Sanlisia has a population of 1,149 of which 576 are males and 573 are females.
