= Mauda, Jharkhand =

Mauda
- Village
- Interactive map of Mauda
- Location within Jharkhand Location within India
- Coordinates: 22°19′48″N 85°57′41″E
- Country: India
- State: Jharkhand
- District: West Singhbhum

Area
  - Total: 4.85 km^{2} (1.87 sq mi)
- Elevation: 244 m (801 ft)

Population (2011)
  - Total: 1,750
  - Estimate (2036): 2,384
  - Density: 361/km^{2} (935/sq mi)

Languages
  - Official: Ho, Odia, Hindi
- Time zone: UTC+5:30 (IST)
- PIN: 833201
- Vehicle registration: JH-06
- Website: chaibasa.nic.in

Mauda is a village on Tantnagar-Bharbharia Road in Manjhari of West Singhbhum district of Jharkhand, India. It is situated at 3 kilometres (1.9mi) from Sub-district headquarters, Bharbharia and 37 kilometres (22.9mi) from district headquarters, Chaibasa. The population is 1,750 people, in 344 households, as per 2011 census. The greater mauda population is 9,784 people, making up 14.3% of Manjhari's population.

== Demographics ==
As per available latest census, Mauda had a population of 1,750.

Male Population is 864 and Female Population is 886.

=== Castes ===
1. Not indigenous (40.5%)
2. Scheduled tribes (59.5%)
3. Scheduled castes (0.00%)

Out of 1,750 people, 1,042 are Scheduled tribes, and the remaining 708 are not indigenous. There are no scheduled castes.

=== Employment ===
The total number of workers are 915, which makes up 52.28% of the population.

=== Education ===
The literacy rate of the village is 49.86%, which is lower than national average of 72.98%. There are 724 educated people in village.

=== Projection ===
In 2027 population will be likely 2,189 with 439 being added since 2011. In 2036 population will be likely 2,384 with 634 being added since 2011.

1. Cultivators (32.0%)
2. Agricultural labourers (14.0%)
3. Household Industries (1.14%)
4. Other services (5.14%)
Source: Census of India
