= Krishna Marandi =

Indian politician

Member of Parliament, Lok Sabha
- In office 1991–1996
- Preceded by: Bagun Sumbrai
- Succeeded by: Chitrasen Sinku
- Constituency: Singhbhum, Bihar

Personal details
- Born: 19 August 1954 (age 71) Haludhani, Singhbhum district, Bihar (Presently Jharkhand, India)
- Party: Jharkhand Mukti Morcha
- Spouse: Moti Marandi

Krishna Marandi is an Indian politician. He was a Member of Parliament, representing Singhbhum, Bihar in the Lok Sabha the lower house of India's Parliament as a member of the Jharkhand Party
