= Madhu Koda =

Indian politician (born 1971)

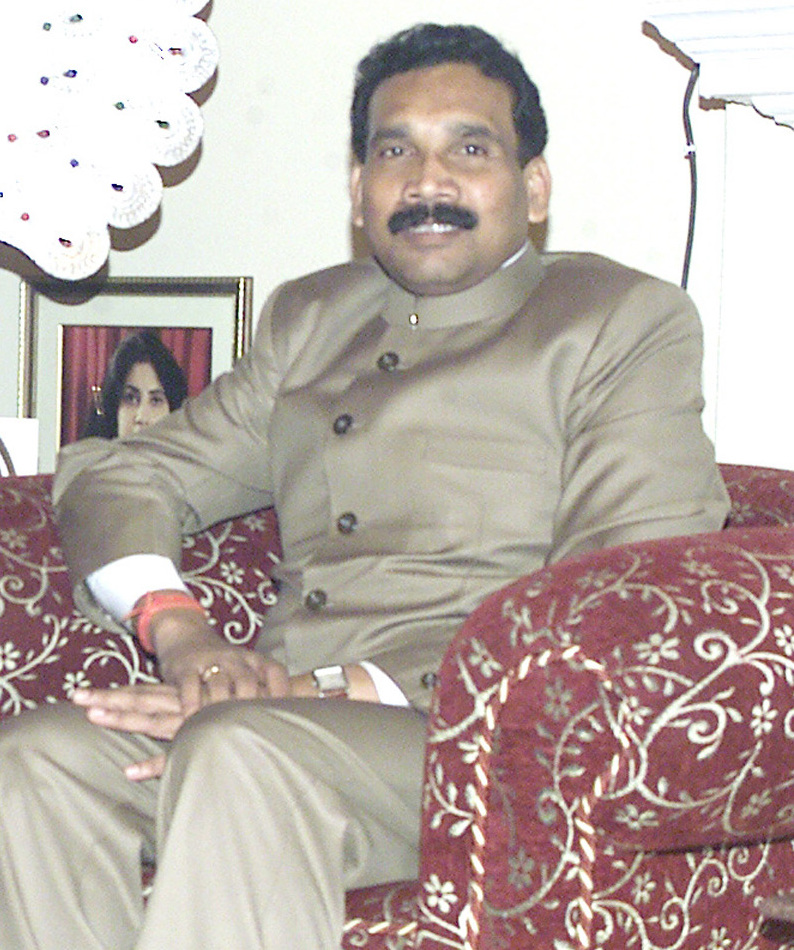

Member of Parliament, Lok Sabha
- In office 16 May 2009 – 16 May 2014
- Preceded by: Bagun Sumbrai
- Succeeded by: Laxman Giluwa
- Constituency: Singhbhum

4th Chief Minister of Jharkhand
- In office 14 September 2006 – 23 August 2008
- Preceded by: Arjun Munda
- Succeeded by: Shibu Soren

Member of the Jharkhand Legislative Assembly
- In office 2000–2009
- Succeeded by: Geeta Koda
- Constituency: Jagannathpur

Minister of Panchayat Raj and Rural Development, Jharkhand
- In office 2003–2005

Minister of Mining Geology and Cooperative, Jharkhand
- In office 2005–2006

Minister of State, Rural Engineering Organisation, Jharkhand
- In office 2000–2003

Personal details
- Born: 6 January 1971 (age 55) Gua, Jharkhand, India
- Party: Bhartiya Janta Party
- Spouse: Geeta Koda (m. 2004)
- Children: 1 daughter

Madhu Koda (born 6 January 1971) is an Indian politician who had served as the Chief Minister of Jharkhand from 2006 to 2008 (UPA alliance). He was sworn in as the fifth Chief Minister of Jharkhand on 18 September 2006, and remained in office until he resigned on 27 August 2008.

Koda is the third independent legislator to assume the office of chief minister of an Indian state, including Bishwanath Das in Orissa in 1971 and Flinder Anderson Khonglam in Meghalaya in 2002.

His wife Geeta Koda, MP from West Singhbhum district is among the six MLAs representing smaller regional parties led by Hemant Soren formed on 13 July 2013. In December 2017, he was convicted by a court of law and sentenced to three-years in jail and fined ₹25 lakh (US$26,000).

== Personal life ==
Madhu Koda was born in Vill. Gua, District. West Singhbhum in Jharkhand. An ethnic Ho, his father is Rasika Koda, a tribal farmer, who lives in Vill. Pathhatu in District. Singhbhum. He is a graduate from IGNOU centre, Bhubneshwar. His father wanted Madhu to have a "normal life" and remain a farmer or iron worker, but after experiencing corruption in the iron industry, he eventually began a career in politics.

Koda is married to Geeta Koda, who is an MLA from his previous constituency Jaganathpur from the Jai Bharat Samanta Party. They have two daughters.

== Political career ==
Madhu Koda began his political career as an activist with the All Jharkhand Students Union. He won in the 2000 Bihar Assembly elections from Jaganathpur as a Bharatiya Janata Party (BJP) candidate. On 15 November 2000 the state of Jharkhand was carved out from the southern part of Bihar. Koda's constituency Jaganathpur was included in Jharkhand and he became a member of the Jharkhand Legislative Assembly. Babulal Marandi of BJP became the first CM of Jharkhand on 15 November 2000.

In this government, Madhu became the Minister of State, Rural Engineering Organisation (Ind. Charge). But there was revolt against Marandi by rebels and he finally resigned. Arjun Munda took over and became the CM on 18 March 2003 and in this government Koda became the minister of Panchayati Raj of Special Arrangement.

During the 2005 Assembly Elections in Jharkhand, the BJP denied Koda a ticket. He contested as an Independent candidate and won from Jaganathpur once again, defeating his nearest rival from the Indian National Congress by over ten thousand votes. Koda extended his support to the BJP-led NDA.

On 2 March 2005, after much political bargaining and quid pro quo Shibu Soren of Congress-JMM alliance was invited to form the government in Jharkhand by the Governor of Jharkhand, Syed Sibtey Razi.

He resigned as Chief Minister nine days later, on 11 March, following his failure to obtain a vote of confidence in the assembly. Then Arjun Munda of BJP-led NDA became the CM, whom Koda supported and he was appointed the Minister of Mining Geology and Cooperative.

In September 2006, Madhu and three other independent legislators withdrew support to the Munda government, bringing it into the minority and led to resignation of Munda The United Progressive Alliance decided on him as consensus candidate to become Chief Minister and Koda became the next CM of Jharkhand on 14 September 2006.

His government included the representatives of the Jharkhand Mukti Morcha, Rashtriya Janata Dal, Jaua Manjhi group, Nationalist Congress Party, All India Forward Bloc, three independent MLAs (besides himself), and the outside support of the Indian National Congress. On 12 August 2008 Shibu Soren again staked claim for the post of CM and wanted Koda to resign. On 17 August 2008 JMM withdrew support from the Koda government, and Koda resigned on 23 August 2008 from the post of CM of Jharkhand. Koda became the UPA in charge of Jharkhand state. Shibu Soren again became the CM of Jharkhand on 27 August 2008.

But Soren suffered a humiliating defeat in the assembly bypoll on 8 January 2009 from Tamar constituency and failed to enter the Jharkhand assembly. He was defeated by Gopal Krishna Patar of Jharkhand Party, now a MLA from JD(U) – a constituent of NDA – by a margin of 9,062 votes. Soren resigned on 12 January 2009 and after this President's rule was imposed in Jharkhand on 19 January 2009 and till 29 December 2009. Koda then won the MP seat from Singhbhum parliamentary constituency again as an independent candidate, the results of which were declared on 16 May 2009.

In the next assembly elections of Jharkhand held 25 November 2009, his wife Geeta Koda won from his constituency Jaganathpur from Jai Bharat Samanta Party, the results of which were declared on 23 December 2009. In 2014 Jharkhand Assembly Election, Madhu Koda lost from the Majhgao constituency. Koda was defeated by Jharkhand Mukti Morcha (JMM) candidate Nial Purty by over 20,000 votes.

== Mining scam conviction ==
It was alleged that Madhu Koda was involved in a mining scam that occurred in Jharkhand in India. It was alleged by investigative agencies that Madhu Koda took huge bribes for illegally allotting iron ore and coal mining contracts in Jharkhand when he was the chief minister of the state. As per estimates, Koda and his associates collected over ₹4,000 crore (US$420 million) by allotting mines to business houses. On orders of Jharkhand High Court CBI is investigating the scam.

Koda was arrested by state police's vigilance wing on 30 November 2009 in connection with the mining scam. On 31 July 2013, he was released on bail from Birsa Munda Prison in Ranchi.

A special money-laundering court in Delhi attached Koda's properties worth ₹144 crore (US$15 million) in a disproportionate assets case against his alleged associates. It found that the properties were involved in the offence of laundering under the provisions of The Prevention Of Money Laundering Act (PMLA) in a case probed by Enforcement Directorate (ED). Some of the attached assets also belonged to Anil Adinath Bastawde, who was arrested by the ED in January 2013 from Jakarta and Manoj B Punamiya, an associate of Koda and an accused in the case. ED sources had said the amount of scam, which had allegedly taken place during Koda's regime between 2006 and 2008 had gone up to ₹3,400 crore (US$350 million) in the course of investigation and the amount excluded Bastawde's assets, who was an absconder for a long time. In December 2017, the court of justice Bharat Parashar convicted Madhu Koda and awarded him a three-year jail term and imposed a fine of ₹25 lakh (US$26,000).
