= Chakradharpur Assembly constituency =

Constituency of the Jharkhand legislative assembly in India

Coordinates: 22.678°N 85.627°E

Chakradharpur
- Constituency No. 56 for the Jharkhand Legislative Assembly

Constituency details
- Country: India
- Region: East India
- State: Jharkhand
- District: West Singhbhum
- Lok Sabha constituency: Singhbhum
- Established: 2000
- Total electors: 181,771
- Reservation: ST

Member of Legislative Assembly
- 5th Jharkhand Legislative Assembly
- Incumbent Sukhram Oraon
- Party: JMM
- Alliance: MGB
- Elected year: 2024

Chakradharpur Assembly constituency is an assembly constituency in the Indian state of Jharkhand.

Most successful parties after separate Jharkhand state.
1. JMM (80.0%)
2. BJP (20.0%)

== Members of the Legislative Assembly ==
Election	Member	Party
Bihar Legislative Assembly
1952	Sukhdeo Manjhi	Jharkhand Party
1957	Shyamal Kumar Pasari	Jharkhand Party
1957	Haricharan Soy	Jharkhand Party
1962	Rudra Sarangi	Independent politician
1967	M. Majhi	Bharatiya Jana Sangh
1969	Maricharan Soy	Independent politician
1972	Theodore Bodra	Indian National Congress
1977	Jagarnath Bakira	Janata Party
1980	Devendra Manjhi	Jharkhand Mukti Morcha
1985	Jagarnath Bakira	Bharatiya Janata Party
1990	Bahadur Oraon	Jharkhand Mukti Morcha
1995	Laxman Giluwa	Bharatiya Janata Party
2000	Chumnu Oraon	Bharatiya Janata Party
Jharkhand Legislative Assembly
2005	Sukhram Oraon	Jharkhand Mukti Morcha
2009	Laxman Giluwa	Bharatiya Janata Party
2014	Shashibhushan Samad	Jharkhand Mukti Morcha
2019	Sukhram Oraon	Jharkhand Mukti Morcha
2024	Sukhram Oraon	Jharkhand Mukti Morcha

== Election results ==
=== Assembly election 2024 ===
2024 Jharkhand Legislative Assembly election: Chakradharpur
Party	Candidate	Votes	%	±%
JMM	Sukhram Oraon	58,639	40.64%	▲3.87
BJP	Shashibhushan Samad	49,329	34.19%	▲7.68
Independent	Vijay Singh Gagrai	20,148	13.96%	New
JLKM	Basanti Purty	7,933	5.50%	New
Independent	Damayanti Nag	1,594	1.10%	New
Independent	Laxmi Hasda	970	0.67%	New
NOTA	None of the Above	3,444	2.39%	▲0.49
Margin of victory		9,310	6.45%	▼3.81
Turnout		1,44,290	69.18%	▲3.60
Registered electors		2,08,581		▲14.75
JMM hold		Swing	▲3.87	

=== Assembly election 2019 ===
2019 Jharkhand Legislative Assembly election: Chakradharpur
Party	Candidate	Votes	%	±%
JMM	Sukhram Oraon	43,832	36.77%	▼15.60
BJP	Laxman Giluwa	31,598	26.51%	▼4.36
JVM(P)	Shashibhusan Samad	17,487	14.67%	▲12.74
AJSU	Ramlal Munda	17,232	14.46%	New
API	Champai Boipai	1,412	1.18%	▼0.49
Independent	Marshal Soy	1,111	0.93%	New
Jharkhand Party	Sukhdeo Hembrom	813	0.68%	New
NOTA	None of the Above	2,264	1.90%	▼0.45
Margin of victory		12,234	10.26%	▼11.25
Turnout		1,19,203	65.58%	▼5.96
Registered electors		1,81,771		▲5.76
JMM hold		Swing	▼15.60	

=== Assembly election 2014 ===
2014 Jharkhand Legislative Assembly election: Chakradharpur
Party	Candidate	Votes	%	±%
JMM	Shashibhusan Samad	64,396	52.37%	▲24.54
BJP	Navami Oraon	37,948	30.86%	▲2.73
INC	Vijay Singh Samad	6,441	5.24%	▼7.48
JVM(P)	Alok Mundu	2,376	1.93%	New
API	Sukhan Ram Hasda	2,056	1.67%	New
Rashtriya Deshaj Party	Bagun Soy	1,976	1.61%	New
Independent	Ramlal Munda	1,942	1.58%	New
NOTA	None of the Above	2,890	2.35%	New
Margin of victory		26,448	21.51%	▲21.21
Turnout		1,22,953	71.54%	▲5.85
Registered electors		1,71,874		▲17.72
JMM gain from BJP		Swing	▲24.24	

=== Assembly election 2009 ===
2009 Jharkhand Legislative Assembly election: Chakradharpur
Party	Candidate	Votes	%	±%
BJP	Laxman Giluwa	26,984	28.14%	▲1.98
JMM	Sukhram Oraon	26,694	27.83%	▼22.24
INC	Sukhdeo Hembrom	12,202	12.72%	New
AJSU	Dashrath Gagrai	12,189	12.71%	▲7.73
JBSP	Avinash Purty	5,827	6.08%	New
RJD	Raja Hembrom	2,022	2.11%	New
AITC	Indra Nath Ho	1,504	1.57%	New
Margin of victory		290	0.30%	▼23.62
Turnout		95,908	65.69%	▲8.20
Registered electors		1,46,002		▲0.53
BJP gain from JMM		Swing	▼21.94	

=== Assembly election 2005 ===
2005 Jharkhand Legislative Assembly election: Chakradharpur
Party	Candidate	Votes	%	±%
JMM	Sukhram Oraon	41,807	50.07%	▲27.62
BJP	Laxman Giluwa	21,835	26.15%	▼4.04
AJSU	Dashrath Gagrai	4,156	4.98%	New
UGDP	Budhram Oraon	3,843	4.60%	▼10.62
CPI	Ladu Jonko	2,284	2.74%	▲1.34
LJP	Shashibhusan Samad	1,963	2.35%	New
Jharkhand Party	Jidan Soy	1,956	2.34%	▼1.22
Margin of victory		19,972	23.92%	▲16.18
Turnout		83,494	57.49%	▼2.55
Registered electors		1,45,234		▲8.59
JMM gain from BJP		Swing	▲19.88	

=== Assembly election 2000 ===
2000 Bihar Legislative Assembly election: Chakradharpur
Party	Candidate	Votes	%	±%
BJP	Chumnu Oraon	24,243	30.19%	New
JMM	Sukhdeo Hembrom	18,030	22.45%	New
INC	Somay Gagrai	17,838	22.21%	New
UGDP	Sukhlal Soy	12,224	15.22%	New
Jharkhand Party	Thomas Purty	2,861	3.56%	New
RJD	Ramesh Oraon	2,661	3.31%	New
CPI	Chandu Kui	1,124	1.40%	New
Margin of victory		6,213	7.74%	
Turnout		80,298	61.28%	
Registered electors		1,33,746		
BJP win (new seat)				

== See also ==
- List of constituencies of the Jharkhand Legislative Assembly
