= Kolai Birua =

Indian politician

Member of Parliament, Lok Sabha
- In office 1967–1971
- Preceded by: Hari Charan Soy
- Succeeded by: Moran Singh Purty
- Constituency: Singhbhum, Bihar

Personal details
- Born: 15 February 1933 (age 93) Demkapada, Singhbhum district, Bihar, British India (Presently Jharkhand, India)
- Party: Jharkhand Party

Kolai Birua (born 15 February 1933) is an Indian politician. He was a Member of Parliament, representing Singhbhum, Bihar in the Lok Sabha the lower house of India's Parliament as a member of the Jharkhand Party.
