= Benisagar =

Village in Jharkhand, India

Benisagar Bēnishāgar
- Village in West Singhbhum, Jharkhand
- Benusagar
- Interactive map of Benisagar
- Location within Jharkhand Location within India Location within Asia
- Coordinates: 21°59′9.614″N 85°53′8.084″E
- Country: India
- State: Jharkhand
- District: West Singhbhum
- Block: Majhhgaon
- Gram Panchayat: Kharpos

Area
  - Total: 1.71 km^{2} (0.66 sq mi)
- Elevation: 391 m (1,283 ft)

Population (2011)
  - Total: 667
  - Density: 390/km^{2} (1,010/sq mi)

Demographics
  - Sex ratio: 1091
  - Literacy: 51.01%
  - Households: 137
- Time zone: UTC+5:30 (IST)
- PIN: 833214
- Vehicle registration: JH-06/OD-11
- Website: chaibasa.nic.in

Benisagar (Bēnishāgar) is a village in Kharpos gram panchayat, Majhgaon subdivision, West Singhbhum district, in Jharkhand, India. The archeological remains features rich history and proving that Singhbhum civilization existed. Benisagar Dak Bangla, is located just near the site. Benisagar temple complex is that similar to that site. Benisagar lake.

== Etymology ==
Benisagar is named after Benu Raja who excavated the large tank situated in the village named after the said tank.

== History ==
Benu Raja excavated the large tank. Colonel Tickel who visited this place in 1840 first reported it. Further in 1875, J.D Belgar visited this place and noticed some scriptures with certain details based on which he ascribed the date of site to the 7th century. As per the local tradition, Benu Raja excavates the tank. However, it has not been archeologically ascertained.

The excavations carried out by the Archeological Survey of India towards southeast and eastern embankment of the tank has brought to the light the two Panchayatana temple complex, secular structures, number of sculptural remains including the images of Surya, Bhairava, Lakulisha, Agni, Kubera, etc. Apart fron these, a stone seal having inscription "Priyangu Dheyam Chatuvidya(Chaturvidya)" that means a person by a name Priyangu, well versed in four vedas has also discovered from the site. The script of the inscription is Brahmi and the language is Sanskrit which may be datable on paleographically 5th century. On the basis of finds, it may be said that the site was inhabited from 5th century to 16/17th century.

Archeological Survey of India, Ranchi Circle has conducted scientific clearance work in the field season 2009–10 at Benisagar, in West Singhbhum district. During the course of scientific clearance, a number of Panchayatana temple exposed within the modern boundary wall and has found the sculptures of Agni, Ganesh, Mahisasurmardani, Surya, Brahma Sirochhedak, Bhairav, Lakulisa, a panel of stone depicting erotic scenes and many more sculptures fragments, yamuna, Shiva lingas, large number of temple architectural fragments, door lintels, door jambs were also traced.

== Geography ==
Benisagar is 15 kilometres (9.3 mi) away from Majhganw, 74 kilometres (46 mi) from Chaibasa, 125 kilometres (78 mi) from Jamshedpur, and 207 kilometres (129 mi) from Ranchi. Benisagar is to border Tiraposi by the west, Punduaburu by the north, Janumpi by the east, and Khuntapada by the south. Benisagar has a land area of 171 ha.

== Demographics ==
As of 2011 census, Benisagar had a population of 667 people, with 319 being males and 348 being females, making the sex ratio of 1091 females per 1000 males. Children population is 120, making 17.99% up of the population. Despite having Rich history, Benisagar faces a low literacy rate at 51.01% with male literacy being at 62.21% and female literacy at 40.7%. Benisagar has a scheduled tribes of 455 with 221 Male scheduled tribes and 234 Female scheduled tribes. Number of households is 137. Unemployed rate is 38.53%, indicating good employment despite low literacy.

== Transport ==
=== Railways ===
Badampahar is the nearest railway station. It is in Odisha. Usually it has memu trains (Badampahar-Tatanagar), but it has additional weekly trains like Rourkela express and Shalimar express.

=== Airways ===
Nearst airport is at Sonari Airport at 96.548 kilometres (59.992 mi) aerial.

=== Bus ===
Benisagar Bus stand is located here. Buses run from Chakradharpur to Karanjia via Chāībāsa. At most there are 10-12 buses in a day (6am - 6pm).
