= Sukhram Oraon =

Indian politician

Member of the Jharkhand Legislative Assembly

Sukhram Oraon is an Indian politician and an MLA elected from Chakradharpur constituency of Jharkhand state as a member of Jharkhand Mukti Morcha in 2005 and 2019 Jharkhand Legislative election.

He defeated BJP state president and former MP Laxman Giluwa by a margin of 12,334 votes in the 2019 election. This is the second time Oraon defeated Laxman Giluwa.
