= Sona Ram Sinku =

Indian politician

Sonaram Sinku
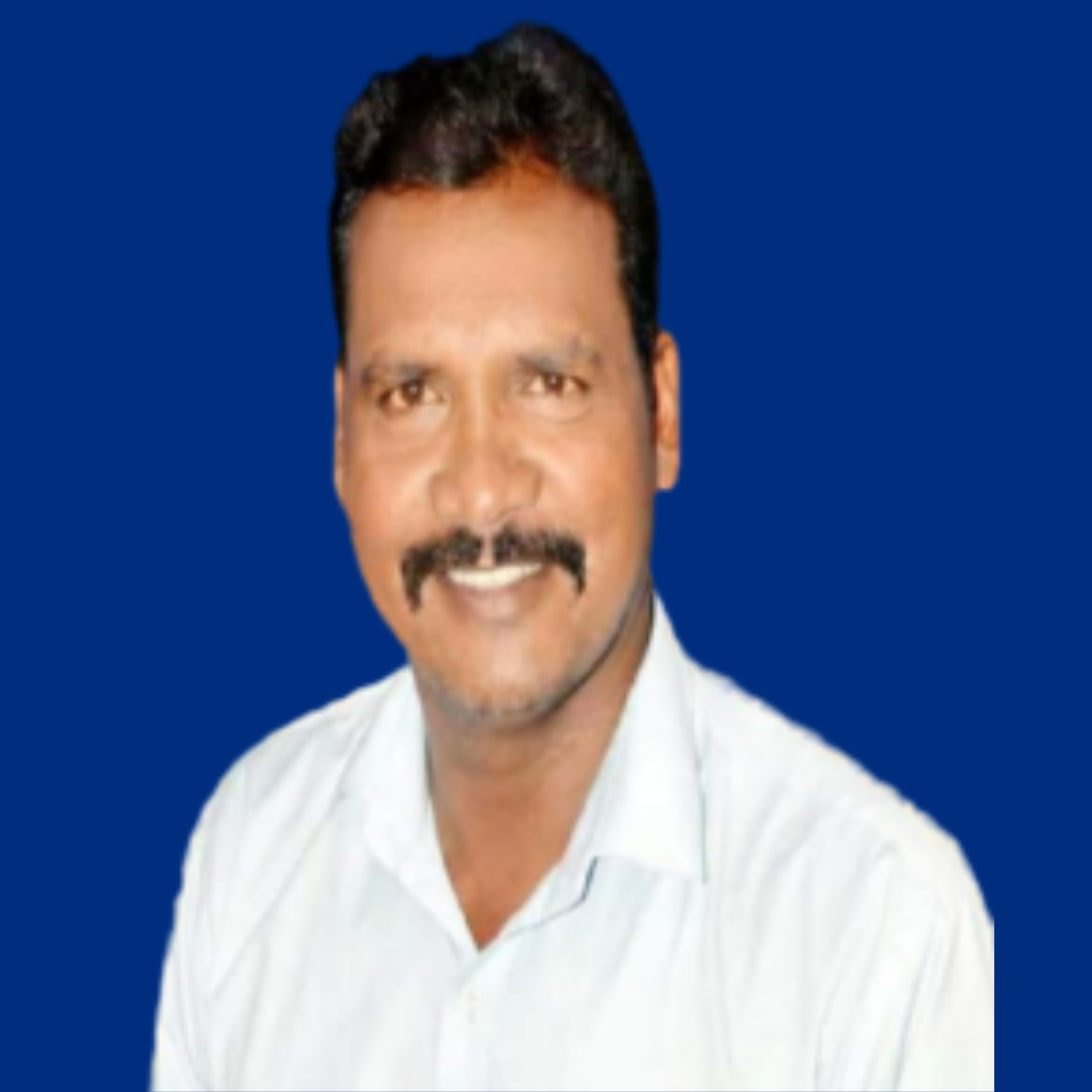

MLA, Jharkhand Vidhan Sabha
- Incumbent
- Assumed office 2019
- Preceded by: Geeta Koda
- Constituency: Jagannathpur

Personal details
- Born: 9 October 1973 (age 53) Jagannathpur, India
- Party: Indian National Congress
- Spouse: 2
- Children: 4
- Occupation: Farmer

Sonaram Sinku is an Indian politician from Jharkhand and a member of the Indian National Congress. He was elected as a member of the Legislative Assembly of Jharkhand from Jaganathpur Assembly constituency in 2019 and retained his seat in the 2024 assembly elections.

On February 21, 2025, Sonaram Sinku was appointed a member of the Tribes Advisory Council in the Jharkhand government. Later, on March 4, 2025, he was appointed the Deputy Chief Whip of Jharkhand government. With this appointment, he was accorded the status of a Minister of State in the Jharkhand government.

In the 2024 Jharkhand Vidhan Sabha elections, Sinku defeated Geeta Koda, the wife of former Jharkhand Chief Minister Madhu Koda and a former Member of Parliament.

On 19 August 2026, Sinku was appointed President of the West Singhbhum District Congress Committee under the Congress's Sangathan Srijan Abhiyan. The appointment was announced by the Indian National Congress in an official press release dated 19 August 2026.

== Early life ==
Sona Ram Sinku was born in a farmer's family and rose to prominence through his active involvement in grassroots politics. During the 1990s, when Jharkhand was part of Bihar, he became a key figure in the movement advocating for the creation of a separate Jharkhand state.
