= Geeta Koda =

Indian politician

Member of Parliament, Lok Sabha
- In office 17 June 2019 – 04 June 2024
- Preceded by: Laxman Giluwa
- Succeeded by: Joba Majhi
- Constituency: Singhbhum

Personal details
- Born: 26 September 1983 (age 42) Singhbhum, Jharkhand, India
- Party: Jai Bharat Samanta Party (2009-2018) Indian National Congress (2018-2024) Bharatiya Janata Party (2024-)
- Spouse: Madhu Koda (m. 2004)

Geeta Koda (Hindi pronunciation: [giːt̪aː koːɽaː]) is an Indian politician and a member of Bharatiya Janata Party and a former Member of Parliament from Singhbhum Lok Sabha constituency. Earlier she was associated with Jai Bharat Samanta Party. On 26 February 2024 she left Indian National Congress and joined BJP on the same day.

== Political career ==
Koda was a member of the Jharkhand Legislative Assembly from the Jaganathpur constituency in West Singhbhum district. She is an ethnic Ho, a scheduled tribe. She is married to Madhu Koda, the former Chief Minister of Jharkhand.

In February 2017, Koda was appointed a member of the Commonwealth Women Parliamentarians Steering Committee (India Region) by Sumitra Mahajan, Speaker of the Lok Sabha.

She was defeated by Jharkhand Mukti Morcha's politician Joba Majhi in 2024 Indian general election. In the 2024 Jharkhand Assembly Election she was defeated by Indian National Congress's candidate Sona Ram Sinku from Jaganathpur Assembly constituency which she & her husband Madhu Kora have represented from 2000-2019.

== Awards and honors ==
- Champions of Change Award in 2019, for her work in Social Welfare (Aspirational Districts). The award was conferred by Shri Pranab Mukherjee at Vigyan Bhavan New Delhi on 20 January 2020.
