= Majhgaon Assembly constituency =

Constituency of the Jharkhand legislative assembly in India

Coordinates: 23.21°N 84.10°E

Majhgaon
- Constituency No. 53 for the Jharkhand Legislative Assembly

Constituency details
- Country: India
- Region: East India
- State: Jharkhand
- District: West Singhbhum
- Lok Sabha constituency: Singhbhum
- Established: 2000
- Total electors: 192,939
- Reservation: ST

Member of Legislative Assembly
- 6th Jharkhand Legislative Assembly
- Incumbent Niral Purty
- Party: JMM
- Alliance: MGB
- Elected year: 2024

Majhgaon Assembly constituency is an assembly constituency in the Indian state of Jharkhand.

Most successful parties after separate Jharkhand state.
1. JMM (80.0%)
2. BJP (20.0%)

== Members of the Legislative Assembly ==
Election	Member	Party
Bihar Legislative Assembly
Before 1957: Constituency did not exist
1957	Saran Balmuchu	Jharkhand Party
1962	Saran Balmuchu	Janata Party
1967	Purna Chandra Birua	Independent politician
1969	Purna Chandra Birua	Independent politician
1972	Debendra Nath Champia	Independent politician
1977	Gobardhan Nayak	Janata Party
1980	Devendra Nath Champia	Indian National Congress
1985	Devendra Nath Champia	Indian National Congress
1990	Devendra Nath Champia	Indian National Congress
1995	Gobardhan Nayak	Janata Dal
2000	Barkuwar Gagrai	Bharatiya Janata Party
Jharkhand Legislative Assembly
2005	Niral Purty	Jharkhand Mukti Morcha
2009	Barkuwar Gagrai	Bharatiya Janata Party
2014	Niral Purty	Jharkhand Mukti Morcha
2019	Niral Purty	Jharkhand Mukti Morcha
2024	Niral Purty	Jharkhand Mukti Morcha

== Election results ==
=== Assembly election 2024 ===
2024 Jharkhand Legislative Assembly election: Majhgaon
Party	Candidate	Votes	%	±%
JMM	Niral Purty	94,163	60.96%	▲9.38
BJP	Barkuwar Gagrai	34,560	22.37%	▲6.72
Independent	Madhav Chandra Kunkal	16,139	10.45%	New
Independent	Saroti Deogam	1,398	0.91%	New
BAP	Bahalen Champia	1,133	0.73%	New
NOTA	None of the Above	3,770	2.44%	▲1.93
Margin of victory		59,603	38.59%	▲2.66
Turnout		1,54,464	71.27%	▲3.19
Registered electors		2,16,721		▲12.33
JMM hold		Swing	▲9.38	

=== Assembly election 2019 ===
2019 Jharkhand Legislative Assembly election: Majhgaon
Party	Candidate	Votes	%	±%
JMM	Niral Purty	67,750	51.58%	▲16.31
BJP	Bhupendra Pingua	20,558	15.65%	▼6.92
Bhartiya Azad Sena	Barkuwar Gagrai	13,502	10.28%	New
AJSU	Nandlal Birua	7,653	5.83%	New
Independent	Madhav Chandra Kunkal	5,170	3.94%	New
JVM(P)	Joseph Purty	2,660	2.03%	▼2.48
Independent	Ashok Birua	2,259	1.72%	New
NOTA	None of the Above	669	0.51%	▼2.15
Margin of victory		47,192	35.93%	▲27.22
Turnout		1,31,352	68.08%	▼5.12
Registered electors		1,92,939		▲10.04
JMM hold		Swing	▲16.31	

=== Assembly election 2014 ===
2014 Jharkhand Legislative Assembly election: Majhgaon
Party	Candidate	Votes	%	±%
JMM	Niral Purty	45,272	35.27%	▲9.89
JBSP	Madhu Kora	34,090	26.56%	▲17.79
BJP	Barkuwar Gagrai	28,969	22.57%	▼13.01
JVM(P)	Sukhdeo Biruli	5,777	4.50%	New
INC	Devendra Nath Champia	4,652	3.62%	▼6.08
JPP	Subhash Chandra Pingua	2,383	1.86%	New
BSP	Vinay Kumar Pingua	2,073	1.62%	New
NOTA	None of the Above	3,408	2.66%	New
Margin of victory		11,182	8.71%	▼1.48
Turnout		1,28,346	73.20%	▲5.65
Registered electors		1,75,337		▲22.02
JMM gain from BJP		Swing	▼0.30	

=== Assembly election 2009 ===
2009 Jharkhand Legislative Assembly election: Majhgaon
Party	Candidate	Votes	%	±%
BJP	Barkuwar Gagrai	34,534	35.58%	▼3.17
JMM	Niral Purty	24,644	25.39%	▼19.35
INC	Anil Kumar Buriuly	9,416	9.70%	New
JBSP	Roshan Pat Pingua	8,513	8.77%	New
Independent	Sukhdeo Biruli	4,145	4.27%	New
UGDP	Chandra Mohan Birua	3,552	3.66%	New
Independent	Lankeshwar Tamsoy	2,752	2.84%	New
Margin of victory		9,890	10.19%	▲4.20
Turnout		97,069	67.55%	▲4.92
Registered electors		1,43,692		▲3.70
BJP gain from JMM		Swing	▼9.16	

=== Assembly election 2005 ===
2005 Jharkhand Legislative Assembly election: Majhgaon
Party	Candidate	Votes	%	±%
JMM	Niral Purty	38,827	44.74%	▲21.80
BJP	Barkuwar Gagrai	33,626	38.74%	▲5.50
RJD	Goberdhan Nayak	4,006	4.62%	▼3.49
BSP	Manoher Sinku	2,666	3.07%	▲0.67
AJSU	Jaipal Singh Bodra	2,567	2.96%	New
Independent	Harish Chandra Alda	2,126	2.45%	New
Jharkhand Party	Gopal Sirka	1,594	1.84%	New
Margin of victory		5,201	5.99%	▼4.31
Turnout		86,788	62.63%	▲2.79
Registered electors		1,38,565		▲9.53
JMM gain from BJP		Swing	▲11.50	

=== Assembly election 2000 ===
2000 Bihar Legislative Assembly election: Majhgaon
Party	Candidate	Votes	%	±%
BJP	Barkuwar Gagrai	25,163	33.24%	New
JMM	Niral Purty	17,364	22.94%	New
INC	Devendra Nath Champia	14,537	19.20%	New
RJD	Gobardhan Nayak	6,133	8.10%	New
Independent	Chitrsen Sinku	3,487	4.61%	New
Independent	Amar Kalundia	2,444	3.23%	New
BSP	Radha Kishan Birua	1,820	2.40%	New
Margin of victory		7,799	10.30%	
Turnout		75,699	61.95%	
Registered electors		1,26,505		
BJP win (new seat)				

== See also ==
- Vidhan Sabha
- List of states of India by type of legislature
