= Chitrasen Sinku =

Indian politician

Member of Parliament, Lok Sabha
- In office 1996 – 1997
- Constituency: Singhbhum

Personal details
- Born: 27 September 1950 (age 75)
- Party: Indian National Congress
- Occupation: Politician

Chitrasen Sinku (born 27 September 1950) is an Indian politician and a member of the 11th Lok Sabha. He was elected as a Member of Parliament representing the Singhbhum constituency in Jharkhand.
