= Jaganathpur Assembly constituency =

Constituency of the Jharkhand legislative assembly in India

Coordinates: 22.716°N 85.957°E

Jaganathpur
- Constituency No. 54 for the Jharkhand Legislative Assembly

Constituency details
- Country: India
- Region: East India
- State: Jharkhand
- District: West Singhbhum
- Lok Sabha constituency: Singhbhum
- Established: 2000
- Total electors: 174,375
- Reservation: ST

Member of Legislative Assembly
- 5th Jharkhand Legislative Assembly
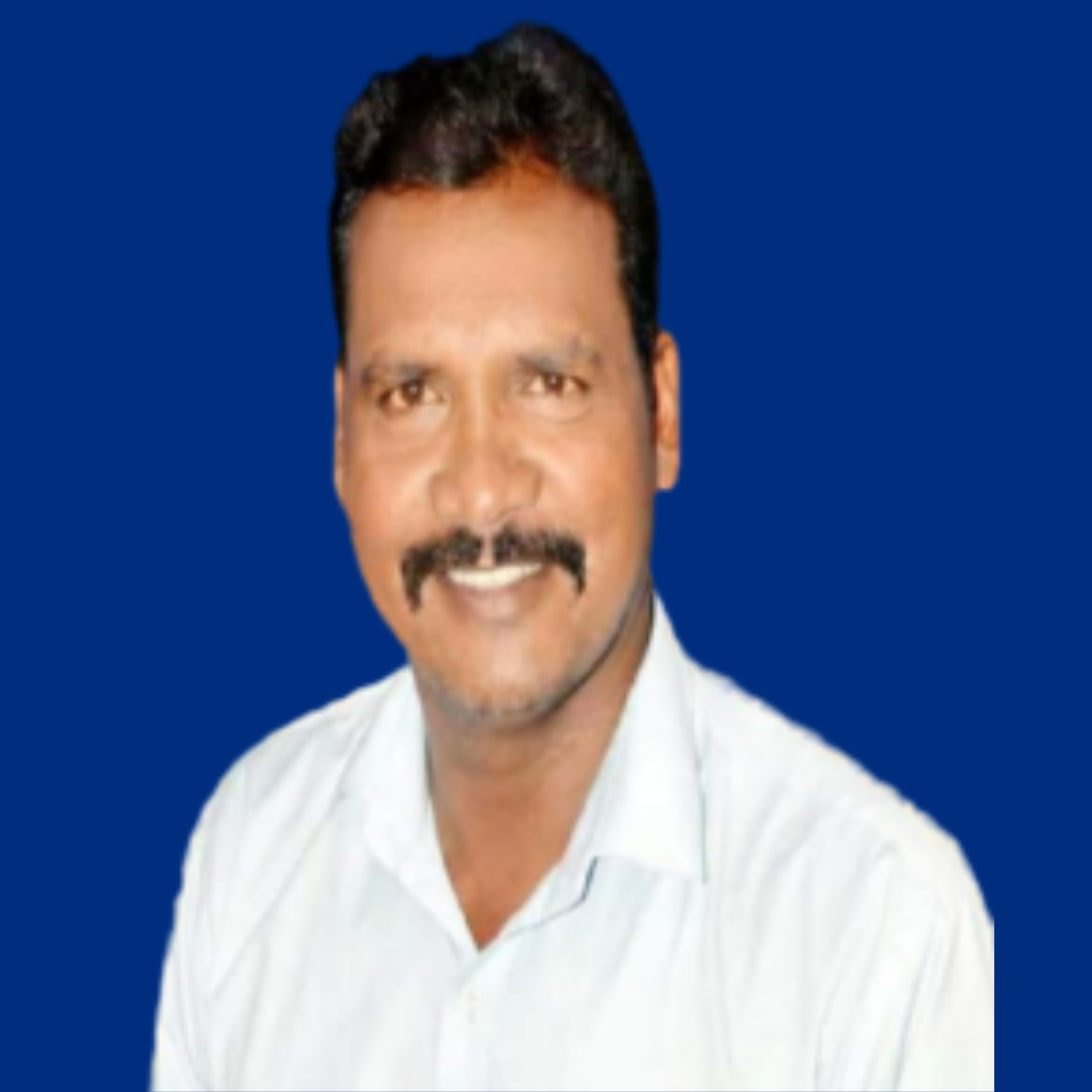
- Incumbent Sona Ram Sinku
- Party: INC
- Alliance: MGB
- Elected year: 2024

Jaganathpur Assembly constituency is an assembly constituency in the Indian state of Jharkhand.

Most successful parties after separate Jharkhand state.
1. JBSP (40.0%)
2. INC (40.0%)
3. Independent (20.0%)

== Members of the Legislative Assembly ==
Election	Member	Party
Bihar Legislative Assembly
Before 1967: Constituency did not exist
1967	V. Pareya	Indian National Congress
1969	Mangal Singh Lamai	Independent politician
1972	Sidiu Hembrom	Indian National Congress
1977	Barju Hansda	Janata Party
1980	Mangal Singh Lamai	Independent politician
1985	Ankura Ho Doreiburu	Indian National Congress
1990	Mangal Singh Lamai	Janata Dal
1995	Mangal Singh Bobonga	Jharkhand People's Party
2000	Madhu Koda	Bharatiya Janata Party
Jharkhand Legislative Assembly
2005	Madhu Koda	Independent politician
2009	Geeta Koda	Jai Bharat Samanta Party
2014	Geeta Koda	Jai Bharat Samanta Party
2019	Sona Ram Sinku	Indian National Congress
2024	Sona Ram Sinku	Indian National Congress

== Election results ==
=== Assembly election 2024 ===
2024 Jharkhand Legislative Assembly election: Jaganathpur
Party	Candidate	Votes	%	±%
INC	Sona Ram Sinku	57,065	40.89%	▲12.27
BJP	Geeta Koda	49,682	35.60%	▲21.11
Independent	Mangal Singh Bobonga	12,559	9.00%	New
Independent	Mansingh Tiriya	6,316	4.53%	New
JLKM	Lakshmi Narayan Laguri	3,900	2.79%	New
Jharkhand Party	Laxmi Narayan Gagrai	2,342	1.68%	New
Independent	Jwala Korah	1,835	1.31%	New
NOTA	None of the Above	5,183	3.71%	▲0.11
Margin of victory		7,383	5.29%	▼4.93
Turnout		1,39,556	70.26%	▲5.13
Registered electors		1,98,634		▲13.91
INC hold		Swing	▲12.27	

=== Assembly election 2019 ===
2019 Jharkhand Legislative Assembly election: Jaganathpur
Party	Candidate	Votes	%	±%
INC	Sona Ram Sinku	32,499	28.62%	▲22.32
JVM(P)	Mangal Singh Bobonga	20,893	18.40%	▲16.26
BJP	Sudhir Kumar Sundi	16,450	14.49%	▼6.64
AJSU	Mangal Singh Suren	14,222	12.52%	New
Independent	Laxmi Suren	6,617	5.83%	New
AITC	Sunny Sinku	5,062	4.46%	New
Independent	Mansingh Tiriya	4,415	3.89%	New
NOTA	None of the Above	4,092	3.60%	▼0.74
Margin of victory		11,606	10.22%	▼11.50
Turnout		1,13,558	65.12%	▼5.80
Registered electors		1,74,375		▲9.14
INC gain from JBSP		Swing	▼14.22	

=== Assembly election 2014 ===
2014 Jharkhand Legislative Assembly election: Jaganathpur
Party	Candidate	Votes	%	±%
JBSP	Geeta Koda	48,546	42.84%	▼2.39
BJP	Mangal Singh Suren	23,935	21.12%	▲7.23
JMM	Mangal Singh Bobonga	19,834	17.50%	▲7.52
INC	Sunny Sinku	7,142	6.30%	New
Independent	Mansingh Tiriya	2,968	2.62%	New
JVM(P)	Prashant Kumar Champiya	2,420	2.14%	▼7.67
Independent	Roya Purti	1,981	1.75%	New
NOTA	None of the Above	4,919	4.34%	New
Margin of victory		24,611	21.72%	▼9.62
Turnout		1,13,321	70.92%	▲10.97
Registered electors		1,59,777		▲16.65
JBSP hold		Swing	▼2.39	

=== Assembly election 2009 ===
2009 Jharkhand Legislative Assembly election: Jaganathpur
Party	Candidate	Votes	%	±%
JBSP	Geeta Koda	37,145	45.23%	New
BJP	Sonaram Birua	11,405	13.89%	▲5.83
JMM	Mangal Singh Suren	8,195	9.98%	New
JVM(P)	Mangal Singh Bobonga	8,052	9.80%	New
Independent	Kishore Kumar Laguri	3,057	3.72%	New
AJSU	Jeetendra Bobonga	2,015	2.45%	▼7.39
Rashtriya Deshaj Party	Tiril Tiriya	1,721	2.10%	New
Margin of victory		25,740	31.34%	▲11.13
Turnout		82,127	59.96%	▲4.00
Registered electors		1,36,974		▲4.77
JBSP gain from Independent		Swing	▲8.49	

=== Assembly election 2005 ===
2005 Jharkhand Legislative Assembly election: Jaganathpur
Party	Candidate	Votes	%	±%
Independent	Madhu Koda	26,882	36.74%	New
INC	Mangal Singh Sinku	12,095	16.53%	▼7.70
UGDP	Jwala Korah	8,438	11.53%	▼2.51
AJSU	Mangal Singh Bobonga	7,201	9.84%	New
BJP	Jawhar Lal Banra	5,895	8.06%	▼25.95
Independent	Sunita Sundi	4,875	6.66%	New
Independent	Sanatan Chatomba	1,695	2.32%	New
Margin of victory		14,787	20.21%	▲10.43
Turnout		73,162	55.96%	▼4.25
Registered electors		1,30,744		▲3.70
Independent gain from BJP		Swing	▲2.73	

=== Assembly election 2000 ===
2000 Bihar Legislative Assembly election: Jaganathpur
Party	Candidate	Votes	%	±%
BJP	Madhu Koda	25,818	34.01%	New
INC	Sonaram Birua	18,394	24.23%	New
JMM	Mangal Singh Bobonga	11,720	15.44%	New
UGDP	Jawala Kora	10,660	14.04%	New
BSP	Shital Hembrom	5,342	7.04%	New
RJD	Kapileshwar Dongo	2,526	3.33%	New
Jharkhand Party	Sadhu Charan Tiria	497	0.65%	New
Margin of victory		7,424	9.78%	
Turnout		75,915	61.90%	
Registered electors		1,26,077		
BJP win (new seat)				

== See also ==
- Vidhan Sabha
- List of states of India by type of legislature
