= Kali Charan Munda =

Indian politician

Member of Parliament, Lok Sabha
- Incumbent
- Assumed office 4 June 2024
- Preceded by: Arjun Munda
- Constituency: Khunti

Personal details
- Born: 10 November 1961 (age 64)
- Party: Indian National Congress

Kali Charan Munda (Hindi pronunciation: [kaːliː t͡ʃəɾəɳ mʊɳɖaː]) is an Indian politician and currently serving as Member of Parliament of Lok Sabha from Khunti. He belongs to the Indian National Congress. Kali Charan Munda has been serving as a member of the Committee on Labour, Textiles and Skill Development since 26 September 2024.

== See also ==
- 18th Lok Sabha
- Indian National Congress
