= Jai Bharat Samanta Party =

- Abbreviation: JBSP
- President: Madhu Koda
- Chairman: Geeta Koda
- Founder: Madhu Koda
- Founded: 2009
- Dissolved: 2018
- Merged into: Indian National Congress
- Headquarters: Jharkhand, India
- Ideology: Social democracy Populism
- Political position: Centre
- ECI Status: State Party
- Alliance: UPA (2009-2018)

The Jai Bharat Samanta Party was a political party in India. It was led by Madhu Koda, former Chief Minister of Jharkhand.

The party fielded nine candidates in the October 2009 Jharkhand Legislative Assembly election. One was elected: Geeta Koda, in the Jaganathpur constituency. In total, the party mustered 93,280 votes (0.91% of the votes in the state). On 1 November 2018, it merged into the Indian National Congress party.
