= Laxman Giluwa =

Indian politician (1964–2021)

Member of parliament, Lok Sabha
- In office 16 May 2014 – 23 May 2019
- Preceded by: Madhu Koda
- Succeeded by: Geeta Koda
- Constituency: Singhbhum

Personal details
- Born: 20 December 1964 Jaanta, Jharkhand, India
- Died: 29 April 2021 (aged 56) Jamshedpur, Jharkhand, India
- Party: Bharatiya Janata Party
- Spouse: Smt. Malati Giluwa
- Children: 4 (2 sons, 2 daughters)
- Education: Ranchi University
- Occupation: Agriculturist
- As of 15 December, 2016

Laxman Giluwa (20 December 1964 – 29 April 2021; Hindi pronunciation: [ləkʂməɳ gɪlʊʋaː]) was an Indian politician and president of the Jharkhand unit of Bharatiya Janata Party. His home state was Jharkhand in India and was a member of the 13th Lok Sabha of the Singhbhum constituency from 1999 to 2004. He also contested in the 2014 Lok Sabha election in Singhbhum district with the ticket of Bharatiya Janata Party.

== Personal life ==
He married on 10 August 1996, to Malati Giluwa. Together, they had four children: two sons and two daughters. He received a B.Com. from the Ranchi University, Ranchi (Bihar) Giluwa. Died from COVID-19 in April 2021.

== Positions held ==
- 1991 Member, District Council, Ernakulam, Kerala
- 1999 Elected to 13th Lok Sabha
- 1999-2000 Member, Committee on Science and Technology, Environment and Forests
- 2000-2004 Member, Consultative Committee, Ministry of Railways
