= West Singhbhum district =

West Singhbhum district Paschimi Singhbhum district
- District of Jharkhand
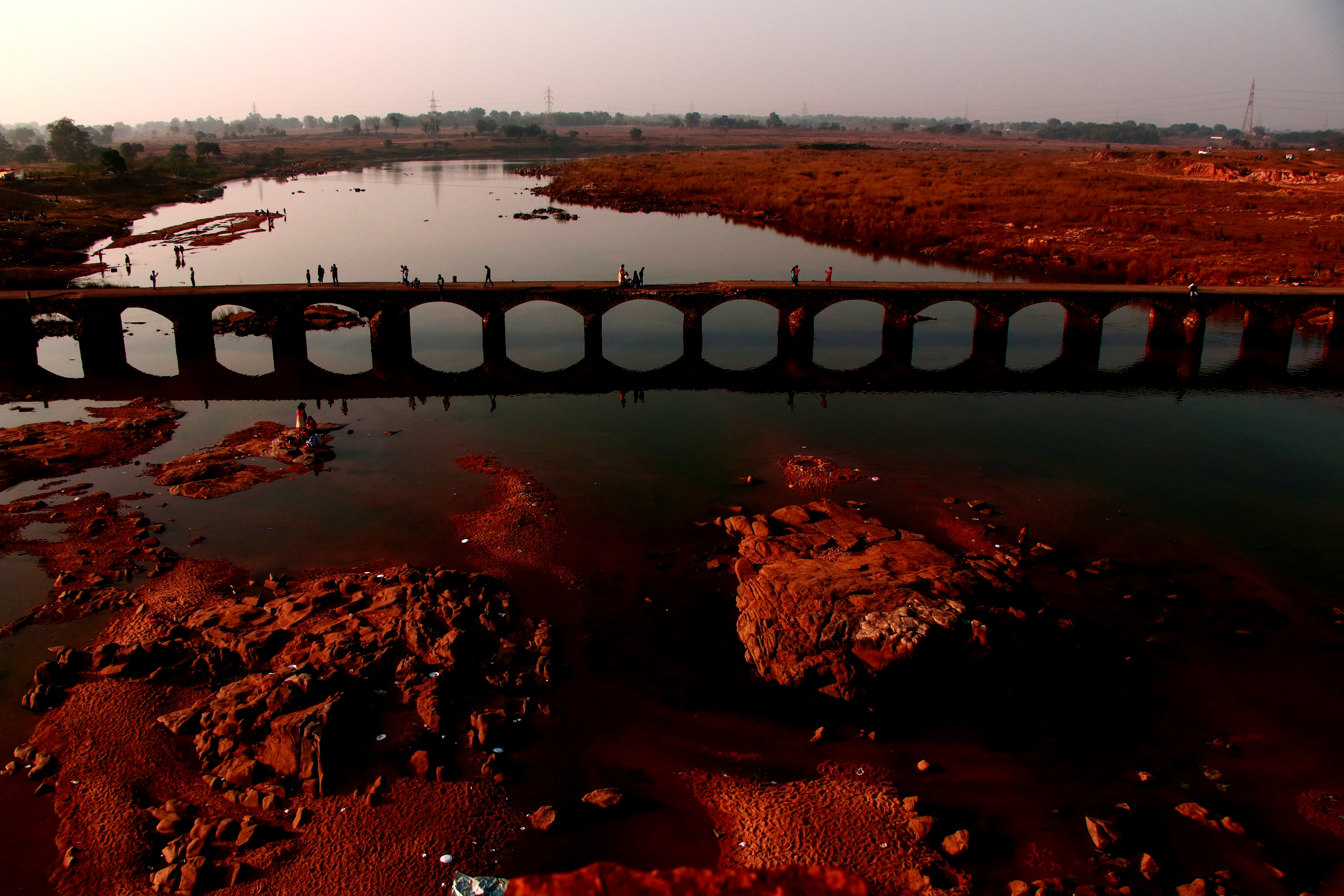
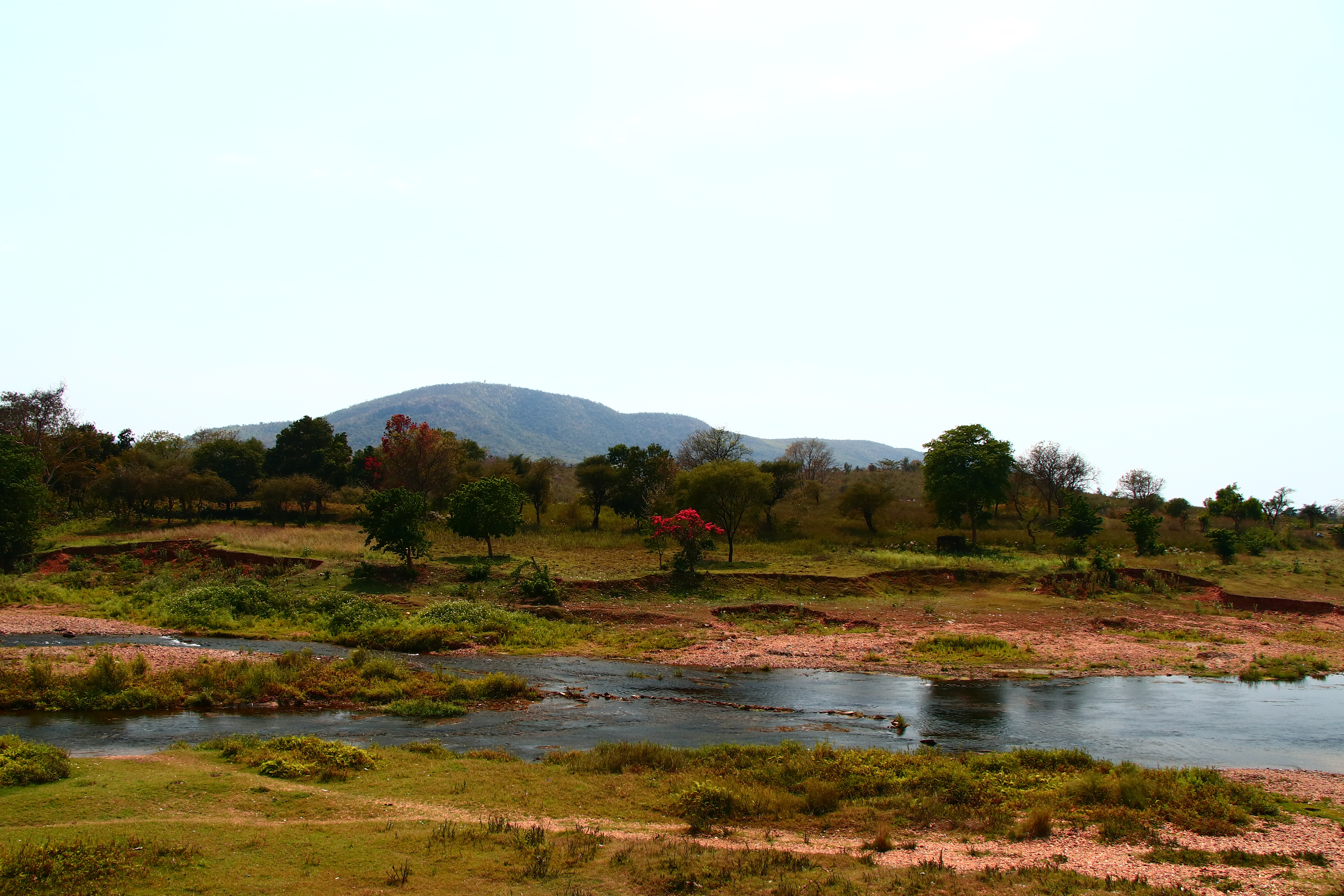
- Kuju River near Chaibasa; Bottom: Sanjay River near Chakradharpur
- Interactive map of West Singhbhum district
- Country: India
- State: Jharkhand
- Division: Kolhan
- Headquarters: Chaibasa

Government
  - Deputy Commissioner: Shri Manish Kumar (IAS)
  - Lok Sabha constituencies: Singhbhum (shared with Seraikela Kharsawan district)
  - Vidhan Sabha constituencies: Chaibasa, Majhgaon, Jaganathpur, Manoharpur, Chakradharpur

Area
  - Total: 7,224 km^{2} (2,789 sq mi)

Population (2011)
  - Total: 1,502,338
  - Density: 208.0/km^{2} (538.6/sq mi)

Demographic
  - Literacy rate: 67.70 %
  - Sex ratio: 958

Language
  - Official: Hindi and English
  - Regional: Ho, Mundari, Odia and Santali
- Time zone: UTC+05:30 (IST)
- Vehicle registration: JH-06
- Average annual precipitation: 1422 mm
- Website: chaibasa.nic.in

West Singhbhum district or Pashchimi Singhbhum district is one of the 24 districts of Jharkhand state, India. It came into existence on 16 January 1990, when the old Singhbhum district (then in Bihar) was bifurcated. Chaibasa is the district headquarter.

The district is bounded on north by Khunti district, on the east by Saraikela Kharsawan district of Jharkhand, on the southeast by Mayurbhanj district of Odisha, on the south by Kendujhar district of Odisha, and on the west by Simdega district of Jharkhand and Sundergarh district of Odisha.West Singhbhum district is located in southern part of Jharkhand

== History ==
Several Iron slags, microlith, Potsherds have been discovered from Singhbhum district which are from 1400 BCE according to Carbon dating age.

Remains of a large city was excavated by Archaeological Survey of India in the village of Benisagar in West Singhbhum, suggesting continuous habitation in the region from 5th to the 16th-17th century.

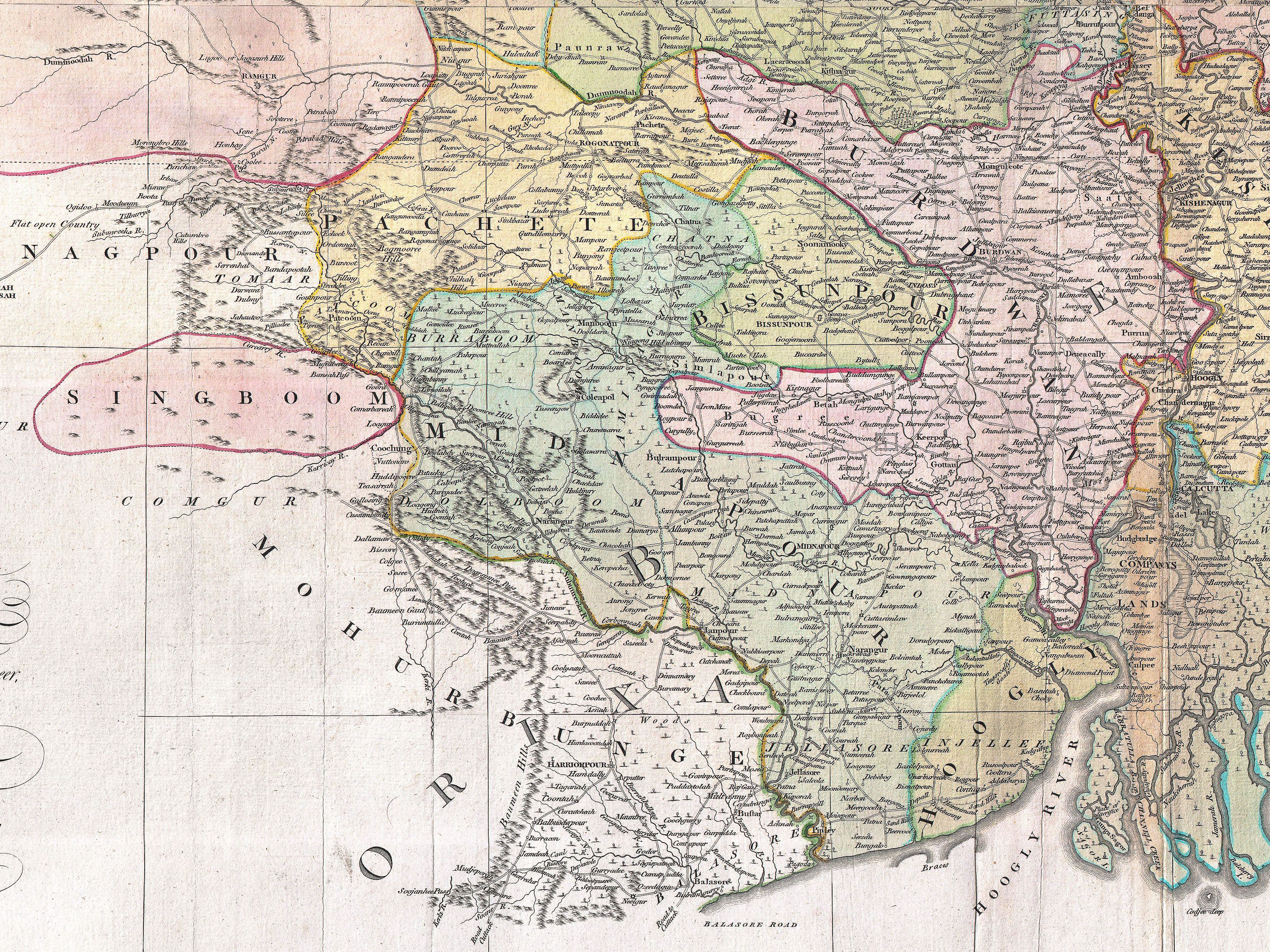
Singhbhum on James Rennell's Mid-18th Century Map.

West Singhbhum is one of the oldest districts of Jharkhand. After the British conquest of Kolhan in 1837, a new district was consequently constituted to be known as Singhbhum with Chaibasa as its headquarters. Subsequently, three districts, namely East Singhbhum, West Singhbhum and Seraikela Kharsawan have been carved out of erstwhile Singhbhum district.

West Singhbhum district came into existence when the old Singhbhum District bifurcated in 1990. With 9 community development blocks the Eastern part became East Singhbhum district with Jamshedpur as its headquarters and with remaining 23 blocks the larger Western part became West Singhbhum district with Chaibasa as its headquarters. In 2001 West Singhbhum again divided into two parts. With 8 blocks Saraikela-Kharsawan district came into existence. At present West Singhbhum remains with 18 blocks and three administrative sub-divisions.

One account suggests that the name is taken from the 'Singh Bonga' the principal deity of the district's tribal Bhumij-Munda population.

It is currently a part of the Red Corridor.

== Geography ==
"The Singhbhum region is possibly Earth's earliest continental land exposed to the air...." Priyadarshi Chowdhury, a geologist at Australia's Monash University is an interesting recent discovery.

West Singhbhum district forms the Southern part of the newly created Jharkhand state and is the largest district in the state. The district spreads from 21.97°N to 23.60°N and from 85.00°E to 86.90°E. The district is situated at an average height of 244 metres above sea level and covers an area of 7629.679 km^{2}.

The district is covered with hills alternating with valleys, steep mountains, and deep forests on the mountain slopes. It contains some of the best Sal tree forests and the famous Saranda forest. There are plenty of waterfalls and a large variety of wild life like elephants, bison, tigers, leopards, bear, wild dogs and wild boars. Sambar Deer and spotted deer are also found but their numbers are decreasing in the forests adjoining inhabited areas.

=== Rivers ===
Following are some of the rivers flowing in the West Singhbhum District: Koel, Karo-Koina, Kuju, Kharkai, Sanjai, Roro, Deo, and Baitarini.

=== Flora and fauna ===
West Singhbhum district is full of dense forests and hills and harbors a variety of flora and fauna. Asia's largest Sal Forest Lies in This District

=== Mines and minerals ===
The greater part of West Singhbhum district is covered with deposits of iron-ore used for iron and steel industry. Other industrially important minerals including the following:

- Chromite
- Magnetite
- Manganese
- Kainite
- Limestone
- Iron Ore
- Asbestos
- Soap-stone

== Administration ==
=== Blocks/Mandals ===
West Singhbhum district consists of 18 Blocks. The following are the list of the Blocks in West Singhbhum district:

1. Chaibasa
2. Chakradharpur
3. Khuntipani
4. Jhinkpani
5. Tonto
6. Kumardungi
7. Tantnagar
8. Jagannathpur
9. Manjhari
10. Manjhgaon
11. Noamundi
12. Bandgaon
13. Manoharpur
14. Goilkera
15. Sonua
16. Gudri
17. Anandpur
18. Hatgamharia

== Demographics ==
Historical population
Year	Pop.	±%
1901	356,991	—
1911	398,590	+11.7%
1921	421,587	+5.8%
1931	515,137	+22.2%
1941	614,298	+19.2%
1951	667,390	+8.6%
1961	765,128	+14.6%
1971	879,564	+15.0%
1981	922,491	+4.9%
1991	1,080,780	+17.2%
2001	1,233,945	+14.2%
2011	1,502,338	+21.8%
Source: Census of India

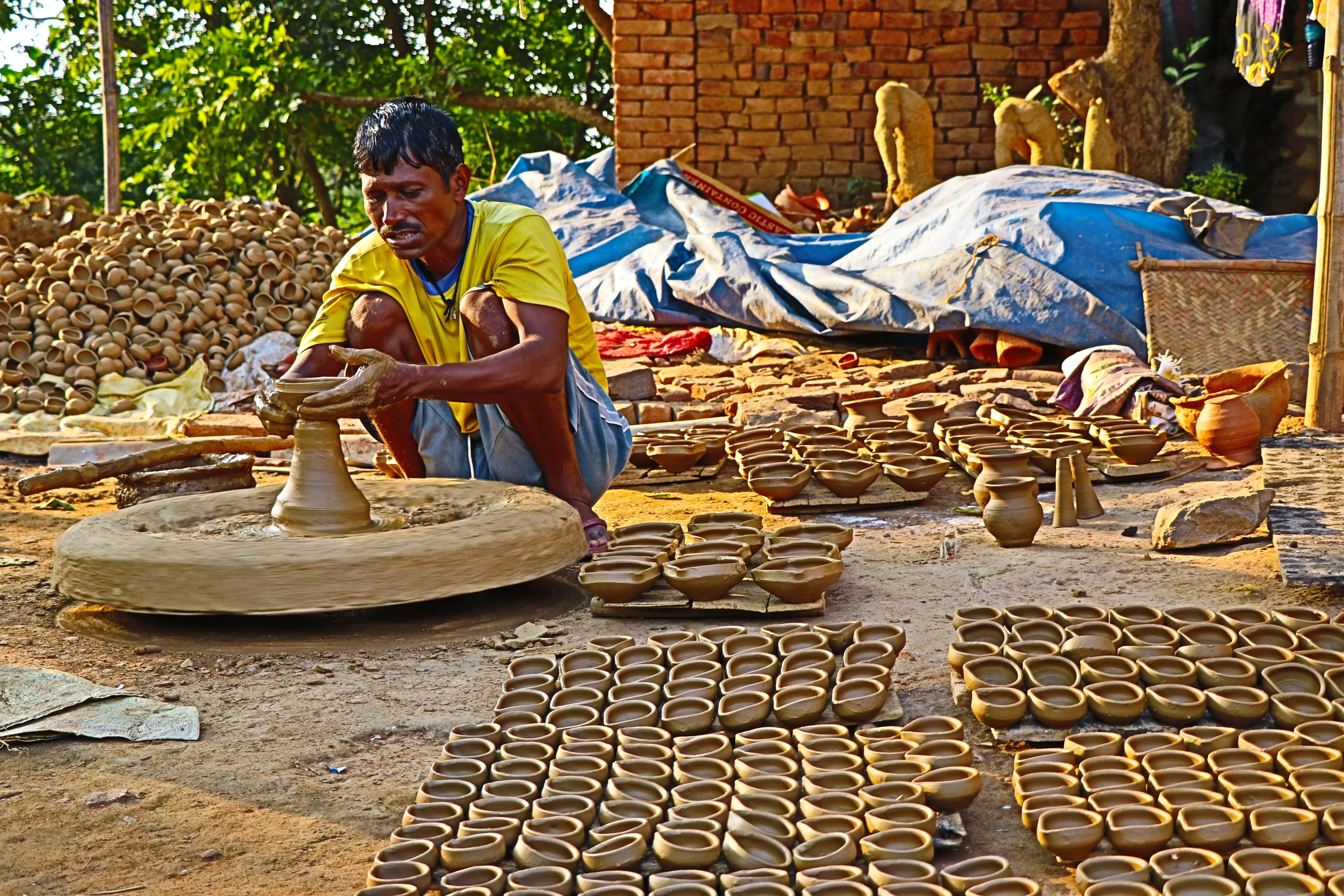
A potter from Chaibasa

According to the 2011 census West Singhbhum district has a population of 1,502,338, roughly equal to the nation of Gabon or the US state of Hawaii. This gives it a ranking of 335th in India (out of a total of 640). The district has a population density of 209 inhabitants per square kilometre (540/sq mi). Its population growth rate over the decade 2001-2011 was 21.69%. Pashchimi Singhbhum has a sex ratio of 1004 females for every 1000 males, and a literacy rate of 58.63%. 14.51% of the population lives in urban areas. The Scheduled Castes and Scheduled Tribes collectively account for 71.1% (3.79% SC and 67.39% ST) of the district's total population. The prominent communities in this group, in terms of the district's total population, are Ho (51.52%), Munda (9.33%), Oraon (2.15%), Bhuiya (1.36%), Santal (1.01%), Gond (0.91%), Ghasi (0.8%), Bhumij (0.71%), Pan (0.51%), Mahli (0.29%), Dhobi (0.25%), Dom (0.25%), Lohra (0.22%), Chamar/Muchi (0.19%), and Kora (0.13%). Additionally, other notable communities include Kharia, Chik Baraik, Bhogta, Turi, Birhor, Kol, Hari/Mehtar/Bhangi, Pasi, Savar, and Lalbegi have populations ranging between one thousand to a hundred.

=== Religion ===
Religion in West Singhbhum district (2011)
Religion	Percent
Sarna	49.96%
Hinduism	41.22%
Christianity	5.83%
Islam	2.54%
Not Stated	0.45%

=== Language ===
Languages of West Singhbhum district (2011)
1. Ho (53.4%)
2. Odia (21.7%)
3. Mundari (8.16%)
4. Hindi (3.64%)
5. Sadri (2.53%)
6. Kurmali (2.08%)
7. Urdu (1.96%)
8. Bengali (1.80%)
9. Kurukh (1.15%)
10. Santali (1.03%)
11. Others (2.54%)

At the time of the 2011 Census of India, 58.37% of the population in the district spoke Ho, 14.74% Odia, 9.16% Mundari, 4.64% Hindi, 2.53% Sadri, 2.08% Kurmali, 1.96% Urdu, 1.80% Bengali, 1.15% Kurukh and 1.03% Santali as their first language.

== Politics ==
District	No.	Constituency	Name	Party	Alliance	Remarks	West Singhbhum	52	Chaibasa	Deepak Birua	JMM	MGB	Cabinet minister
53	Majhgaon	Niral Purty					West Singhbhum				JMM	MGB	
54	Jaganathpur	Sona Ram Sinku		INC			West Singhbhum					MGB	
55	Manoharpur	Jagat Majhi		JMM			West Singhbhum					MGB	
56	Chakradharpur	Sukhram Oraon		JMM			West Singhbhum					MGB	

== See also ==
- East Singhbhum district
- Seraikela Kharsawan district
