= 1st Jharkhand Assembly =

Indian state legislature (2000–2005)

Legislative Assembly of Jharkhand

Type
- Type: Unicameral
- Houses: Jharkhand Legislative Assembly
- Term limits: 2000-2005

History
- Founded: 15 November 2000
- Preceded by: Established
- Succeeded by: 2nd Jharkhand Assembly

Leadership
- Governors of Jharkhand: Prabhat Kumar
- Speaker of the Assembly: Inder Singh Namdhari, Janata Dal (United)
- Deputy Speaker of the Assembly: Bagun Sumbrai, Indian National Congress
- Chief Ministers of Jharkhand: Babulal Marandi, Bharatiya Janata Party

Structure
- Seats: 82 (81 directly elected, 1 nominated)
- Length of term: 5 years

Elections
- Last election: 2000
- Next election: 2005

Meeting place
- Old Secretariat

Website
- jharkhandvidhansabha.nic.in

The 1st Jharkhand Assembly was constituted based on the 2000 Bihar Legislative Assembly election after the formation of the new Jharkhand state. Jharkhand was created by carving out the southern districts of Bihar on 15 November 2000.

After the formation of Jharkhand on 15 November 2000, the first Legislative Assembly of Jharkhand was constituted by the MLAs elected in the 2000 Bihar Legislative Assembly election, whose constituencies were in the newly formed Jharkhand. It was a hung assembly and no single party or pre-election alliance got the majority.

The 2005 Jharkhand Legislative Assembly election was the first one being conducted in Jharkhand.

== Member of Legislative Assembly ==
Member of Legislative Assembly (Jharkhand)
Constituency		MLA Name	Party
#	Name	MLA Name	Party
1	Rajmahal	Arun Mandal	Bharatiya Janata Party
2	Borio	Lobin Hembrom	Jharkhand Mukti Morcha
3	Barhait	Hemlal Murmu	Jharkhand Mukti Morcha
4	Litipara	Sushila Hansdak	Jharkhand Mukti Morcha
5	Pakaur	Alamgir Alam	Indian National Congress
6	Maheshpur	Devidhan Besra	Bharatiya Janata Party
7	Shikaripara	Nalin Soren	Jharkhand Mukti Morcha
8	Nala	Bisheswar Khan	Communist Party of India
9	Jamtara	Furqan Ansari	Indian National Congress
10	Dumka	Stephen Marandi	Jharkhand Mukti Morcha
11	Jama	Durga Soren	Jharkhand Mukti Morcha
12	Jarmundi	Devendra Kunwar	Bharatiya Janata Party
13	Madhupur	Haji Hussain Ansari	Jharkhand Mukti Morcha
14	Sarath	Shashank Shekhar Bhokta	Jharkhand Mukti Morcha
15	Deoghar	Suresh Paswan	Rashtriya Janata Dal
16	Poreyahat	Pradeep Yadav	Bharatiya Janata Party
16	Poreyahat	Prashant Kumar Mandal	Jharkhand Mukti Morcha
17	Godda	Sanjay Prasad Yadav	Rashtriya Janata Dal
18	Mahagama	Ashok Kumar	Bharatiya Janata Party
19	Kodarma	Annpurna Devi	Rashtriya Janata Dal
20	Barkatha	Bhubneshwar Prasad Mehta	Communist Party of India
21	Barhi	Manoj Kumar Yadav	Indian National Congress
22	Barkagaon	Loknath Mahto	Bharatiya Janata Party
23	Ramgarh	Shabbir Ahemad Quraishi	Communist Party of India
23	Ramgarh	Babulal Marandi	Bharatiya Janata Party
24	Mandu	Tek Lal Mahto	Jharkhand Mukti Morcha
25	Hazaribagh	Deo Dayal	Bharatiya Janata Party
26	Simaria	Yogendra Nath Baitha	Rashtriya Janata Dal
27	Chatra	Satyanand Bhogta	Bharatiya Janata Party
28	Dhanwar	Ravindra Kumar Ray	Bharatiya Janata Party
29	Bagodar	Mahendar Prasad Singh	Communist Party of India
30	Jamua	Baldeo Hazra	Rashtriya Janata Dal
31	Gandey	Salkhan Soren	Jharkhand Mukti Morcha
32	Giridih	Chandra Mohan Prasad	Bharatiya Janata Party
33	Dumri	Lalchand Mahto	Janata Dal (United)
34	Gomia	Madhav Lal Singh	Independent
35	Bermo	Rajendra Prasad Singh	Indian National Congress
36	Bokaro	Samresh Singh	Independent
37	Chandankiyari	Haru Rajwar	Jharkhand Mukti Morcha
38	Sindri	Fulchand Mandal	Bharatiya Janata Party
39	Nirsa	Gurudas Chatterjee	Marxist Co-ordination Committee
40	Dhanbad	Pashupati Nath Singh	Bharatiya Janata Party
41	Jharia	Bacha Singh	Samata Party
42	Tundi	Saba Ahmad	Rashtriya Janata Dal
43	Baghmara	Jaleshwar Mahato	Samata Party
44	Baharagora	Dinesh Sarangi	Bharatiya Janata Party
45	Ghatsila	Pradeep Kumar Balmuchu	Indian National Congress
46	Potka	Maneka Sardar	Bharatiya Janata Party
47	Jugsalai	Dulal Bhuiyan	Jharkhand Mukti Morcha
48	Jamshedpur East	Raghubar Das	Bharatiya Janata Party
49	Jamshedpur West	Mrigendra Pratap Singh	Bharatiya Janata Party
50	Ichaghar	Arvind Kumar Singh	Bharatiya Janata Party
51	Seraikella	Anant Ram Tudu	Bharatiya Janata Party
52	Chaibasa	Bagun Sumbrai	Indian National Congress
53	Majhgaon	Badkunwar Gagrai	Bharatiya Janata Party
54	Jaganathpur	Madhu Koda	Bharatiya Janata Party
55	Manoharpur	Joba Majhi	United Goans Democratic Party
56	Chakradharpur	Chumnu Oraon	Bharatiya Janata Party
57	Kharsawan	Arjun Munda	Bharatiya Janata Party
58	Tamar	Ramesh Singh Munda	Samata Party
59	Torpa	Koche Munda	Bharatiya Janata Party
60	Khunti	Nilkanth Singh Munda	Bharatiya Janata Party
61	Silli	Sudesh Mahto	United Goans Democratic Party
62	Khijri	Sawna Lakra	Indian National Congress
63	Ranchi	C.P.Singh	Bharatiya Janata Party
64	Hatia	Ramji Lal Sharda	Bharatiya Janata Party
65	Kanke	Ram Chandra Nayak	Bharatiya Janata Party
66	Mandar	Deo Kumar Dhan	Indian National Congress
67	Sisai	Dinesh Oraon	Bharatiya Janata Party
68	Gumla	Sudarshan Bhagat	Bharatiya Janata Party
69	Bishunpur	Chandresh Oraon	Bharatiya Janata Party
70	Simdega	Neil Tirkey	Indian National Congress
71	Kolebira	Theodor Kiro	Indian National Congress
72	Lohardaga	Sadhanu Bhagat	Bharatiya Janata Party
73	Manika	Yamuna Singh	Bharatiya Janata Party
74	Latehar	Baidyanath Ram	Bharatiya Janata Party
75	Panki	Madhu Singh	Samata Party
76	Daltonganj	Inder Singh Namdhari	Janata Dal (United)
77	Bishrampur	Chandra Shekhar Dubey	Indian National Congress
78	Chhatarpur	Manoj Kumar	Rashtriya Janata Dal
79	Hussainabad	Sanjay Kumar Singh Yadav	Rashtriya Janata Dal
80	Garhwa	Girinath Singh	Rashtriya Janata Dal
81	Bhawanathpur	Ramchandra Keshri	Samata Party
