= 4th Jharkhand Assembly =

Unicameral legislature of the India state of Jharkhand

Jharkhand Legislative Assembly

Type
- Type: Unicameral
- Houses: Jharkhand Legislative Assembly
- Term limits: 2014-2019

History
- Founded: 2014
- Preceded by: 3rd Jharkhand Assembly
- Succeeded by: 5th Jharkhand Assembly

Leadership
- Speaker: Dinesh Oraon, BJP
- Leader of the House (Chief Minister): Raghubar Das, BJP
- Leader of the Opposition: Hemant Soren, JMM

Structure
- Seats: 81
- Political groups: Government (47): BJP (44); AJSU (3); Opposition (22): JMM (16); INC (6); Others (5): JVM(P) (2); CPI(ML) (1); BSP (1); MCC (1); Vacant (7): Vacant (7)
- Length of term: 5 years

Elections
- Last election: November - December 2014
- Next election: November - December 2019

Meeting place
- Vidhan Bhawan, Ranchi, Jharkhand

Website
- jharkhandvidhansabha.nic.in

The 4th Jharkhand Assembly was constituted after the 2014 Jharkhand Legislative Assembly election

The unicameral state legislature of Jharkhand state in India. The seat of the Vidhan Sabha is at Ranchi, the capital of the state. The Vidhan Sabha comprises 81 Members of Legislative Assembly, directly elected from single-seat constituencies.

== Major laws passed ==
=== Pathalgadi movement against tribal land law amendments ===
In 2016–2017, the Raghubar Das government was seeking amendments to the Chhotanagpur Tenancy Act, 1908, and the Santhal Pargana Tenancy Act, 1949. These two original laws had safeguarded the rights of the tribal communities on their land. According to the existing laws the land transactions could only be done between the tribals. The new amendments gave the tribals the right to allow the government to make commercial use of the tribal land and to take the tribal land on lease. The proposed bill amending the existing law had been approved by the Jharkhand Legislative Assembly. The bills were sent to Murmu for approval in November 2016.

The tribal people had strongly objected to the proposed law. During the Pathalgardi rebellion, protests were held against the proposed amendments to the tenancy acts. In one incident the protests turned violent and the tribals abducted the security detail of the BJP MP Karia Munda. Police responded with a violent crackdown on the tribals that caused the death of a tribal man. Criminal cases were filed against more than 200 people including the tribal rights activist Father Stan Swamy. Governor Droupadi Murmu, was criticized for her soft stand on police aggression against tribals during the movement. According to woman tribal rights activist Aloka Kujur she was expected to speak up to the government in support of the tribals but it did not happen, and instead she appealed to the Pathalgarhi agitation leaders to repose faith in the constitution.

Murmu had received total of 192 memorandums against the amendments in the bill. Then opposition leader Hemant Soren had said that the BJP government wanted to acquire tribal land through the two amendment Bills for the benefit of corporates. Opposition parties Jharkhand Mukti Morcha, the Congress, the Jharkhand Vikas Morcha and others had put intense pressure against the bill. On 24 May 2017, Murmu relented and refused to give assent to the bills and returned the bill to the state government along with the memorandums she had received. The bill was later withdrawn in August 2017.

=== Religion and land bill ===
In 2017, the ministry approved the Freedom of Religion Bill, 2017, and the bill to amend the Land Acquisition 2013 Act passed by the Jharkhand Assembly.

The new religion bill makes it an offence subject to a penalty of three years in prison, to coerce or lure a person to convert their religion. If the person coerced is a member of a Scheduled Caste or tribe, a minor, or female, the prison term increases to four years. Fines can be levied in any case. The bill also made it mandatory for voluntary converts, to inform the Deputy Commissioner about their conversion, and to give full details about the circumstances.

The amendments in the Land Acquisition Act, 2013, involved changes in the compensation duration and requirements for social impacts assessment. According to the passed law, monetary compensation for government acquisition of tribal land must be paid within six months of acquisition. The requirement for social impact assessments was dropped for some types of infrastructure projects.

== Composition ==
After the 2014 Jharkhand Legislative Assembly election.

Parties and Coalitions	Seats
Parties and Coalitions	Won
Bharatiya Janata Party	37
Jharkhand Mukti Morcha	19
Jharkhand Vikas Morcha (Prajatantrik)	8
Indian National Congress	6
All Jharkhand Students Union	5
Bahujan Samaj Party	1
Communist Party of India (Marxist–Leninist) Liberation	1
Jharkhand Party	1
Marxist Co-ordination Committee	1
Jai Bharat Samanta Party	1
Nav Jawan Sangharsh Morcha	1

Composition at the end of the Assembly session

Party	Seats
Bharatiya Janata Party	44
Jharkhand Mukti Morcha	16
Indian National Congress	6
All Jharkhand Students Union	3
Jharkhand Vikas Morcha (P)	2
Communist Party of India (ML)	1
Bahujan Samaj Party	1
Marxist Co-ordination Committee	1
Vacant	7

== Member of Legislative Assembly ==
Member of Legislative Assembly (Jharkhand)
Assembly Constituency		Member	
#	Name	MLA Name	Party
1	Rajmahal	Anant Kumar Ojha	Bharatiya Janata Party
2	Borio	Tala Marandi	Bharatiya Janata Party
3	Barhait	Hemant Soren	Jharkhand Mukti Morcha
4	Litipara	Anil Murmu	Jharkhand Mukti Morcha
5	Pakaur	Alamgir Alam	Indian National Congress
6	Maheshpur	Stephen Marandi	Jharkhand Mukti Morcha
7	Shikaripara	Nalin Soren	Jharkhand Mukti Morcha
8	Nala	Rabindra Nath Mahato	Jharkhand Mukti Morcha
9	Jamtara	Irfan Ansari	Indian National Congress
10	Dumka	Louis Marandi	Bharatiya Janata Party
11	Jama	Sita Soren	Jharkhand Mukti Morcha
12	Jarmundi	Badal Patralekh	Indian National Congress
13	Madhupur	Raj Paliwar	Bharatiya Janata Party
14	Sarath	Randhir Kumar Singh	Jharkhand Vikas Morcha (P)
15	Deoghar	Narayan Das	Bharatiya Janata Party
16	Poreyahat	Pradeep Yadav	Jharkhand Vikas Morcha (P)
17	Godda	Raghu Nandan Mandal	Bharatiya Janata Party
18	Mahagama	Ashok Kumar	Bharatiya Janata Party
19	Kodarma	Neera Yadav	Bharatiya Janata Party
20	Barkatha	Janki Prasad Yadav	Jharkhand Vikas Morcha (P)
21	Barhi	Manoj Kumar Yadav	Indian National Congress
22	Barkagaon	Nirmala Devi	Indian National Congress
23	Ramgarh	Chandra Prakash Choudhary	All Jharkhand Students Union
24	Mandu	Jai Prakash Bhai Patel	Jharkhand Mukti Morcha
25	Hazaribagh	Manish Jaiswal	Bharatiya Janata Party
26	Simaria	Ganesh Ganjhu	Jharkhand Vikas Morcha (P)
27	Chatra	Jay Prakash Singh Bhogta	Bharatiya Janata Party
28	Dhanwar	Raj Kumar Yadav	Communist Party of India (Marxist–Leninist) Liberation
29	Bagodar	Nagendra Mahto	Bharatiya Janata Party
30	Jamua	Kedar Hazra	Bharatiya Janata Party
31	Gandey	Jai Prakash Verma	Bharatiya Janata Party
32	Giridih	Nirbhay Kumar Shahabadi	Bharatiya Janata Party
33	Dumri	Jagarnath Mahto	Jharkhand Mukti Morcha
34	Gomia	Yogendra Prasad	Jharkhand Mukti Morcha
35	Bermo	Yogeshwar Mahto	Bharatiya Janata Party
36	Bokaro	Biranchi Narayan	Bharatiya Janata Party
37	Chandankiyari	Amar Kumar Bauri	Jharkhand Vikas Morcha (P)
38	Sindri	Fulchand Mandal	Bharatiya Janata Party
39	Nirsa	Arup Chatterjee	Marxist Co-ordination Committee
40	Dhanbad	Raj Sinha	Bharatiya Janata Party
41	Jharia	Sanjeev Singh	Bharatiya Janata Party
42	Tundi	Raj Kishore Mahato	All Jharkhand Students Union
43	Baghmara	Dulu Mahato	Bharatiya Janata Party
44	Baharagora	Kunal Sarangi	Jharkhand Mukti Morcha
45	Ghatsila	Laxman Tudu	Bharatiya Janata Party
46	Potka	Maneka Sardar	Bharatiya Janata Party
47	Jugsalai	Ram Chandra Sahis	All Jharkhand Students Union
48	Jamshedpur East	Raghubar Das	Bharatiya Janata Party
49	Jamshedpur West	Saryu Roy	Bharatiya Janata Party
50	Ichaghar	Sadhu Charan Mahato	Bharatiya Janata Party
51	Seraikella	Champai Soren	Jharkhand Mukti Morcha
52	Chaibasa	Deepak Birua	Jharkhand Mukti Morcha
53	Majhgaon	Niral Purty	Jharkhand Mukti Morcha
54	Jaganathpur	Geeta Koda	Jai Bharat Samanta Party
55	Manoharpur	Joba Majhi	Jharkhand Mukti Morcha
56	Chakradharpur	Shashibhushan Samad	Jharkhand Mukti Morcha
57	Kharsawan	Dashrath Gagrai	Jharkhand Mukti Morcha
58	Tamar	Vikash Kumar Munda	All Jharkhand Students Union
59	Torpa	Paulus Surin	Jharkhand Mukti Morcha
60	Khunti	Nilkanth Singh Munda	Bharatiya Janata Party
61	Silli	Amit Kumar	Jharkhand Mukti Morcha
62	Khijri	Ram Kumar Pahan	Bharatiya Janata Party
63	Ranchi	C.P.Singh	Bharatiya Janata Party
64	Hatia	Navin Jaiswal	Jharkhand Vikas Morcha (P)
65	Kanke	Jitu Charan Ram	Bharatiya Janata Party
66	Mandar	Gangotri Kujur	Bharatiya Janata Party
67	Sisai	Dinesh Oraon	Bharatiya Janata Party
68	Gumla	Shivshankar Oraon	Bharatiya Janata Party
69	Bishunpur	Chamra Linda	Jharkhand Mukti Morcha
70	Simdega	Vimla Pradhan	Bharatiya Janata Party
71	Kolebira	Anosh Ekka	Jharkhand Party
72	Lohardaga	Kamal Kishore Bhagat	All Jharkhand Students Union
73	Manika	Harikrishna Singh	Bharatiya Janata Party
74	Latehar	Prakash Ram	Jharkhand Vikas Morcha (P)
75	Panki	Bidesh Singh	Indian National Congress
76	Daltonganj	Alok Kumar Chaurasiya	Jharkhand Vikas Morcha (P)
77	Bishrampur	Ramchandra Chandravanshi	Bharatiya Janata Party
78	Chhatarpur	Radha Krishna Kishore	Bharatiya Janata Party
79	Hussainabad	Kushwaha Shivpujan Mehta	Bahujan Samaj Party
80	Garhwa	Satyendra Nath Tiwari	Bharatiya Janata Party
81	Bhawanathpur	Bhanu Pratap Sahi	Nav Jawan Sangharsh Morcha
