= List of leaders of the opposition in the Jharkhand Legislative Assembly =

Person who heads official opposition

Leader of the Opposition of the Jharkhand Legislative Assembly
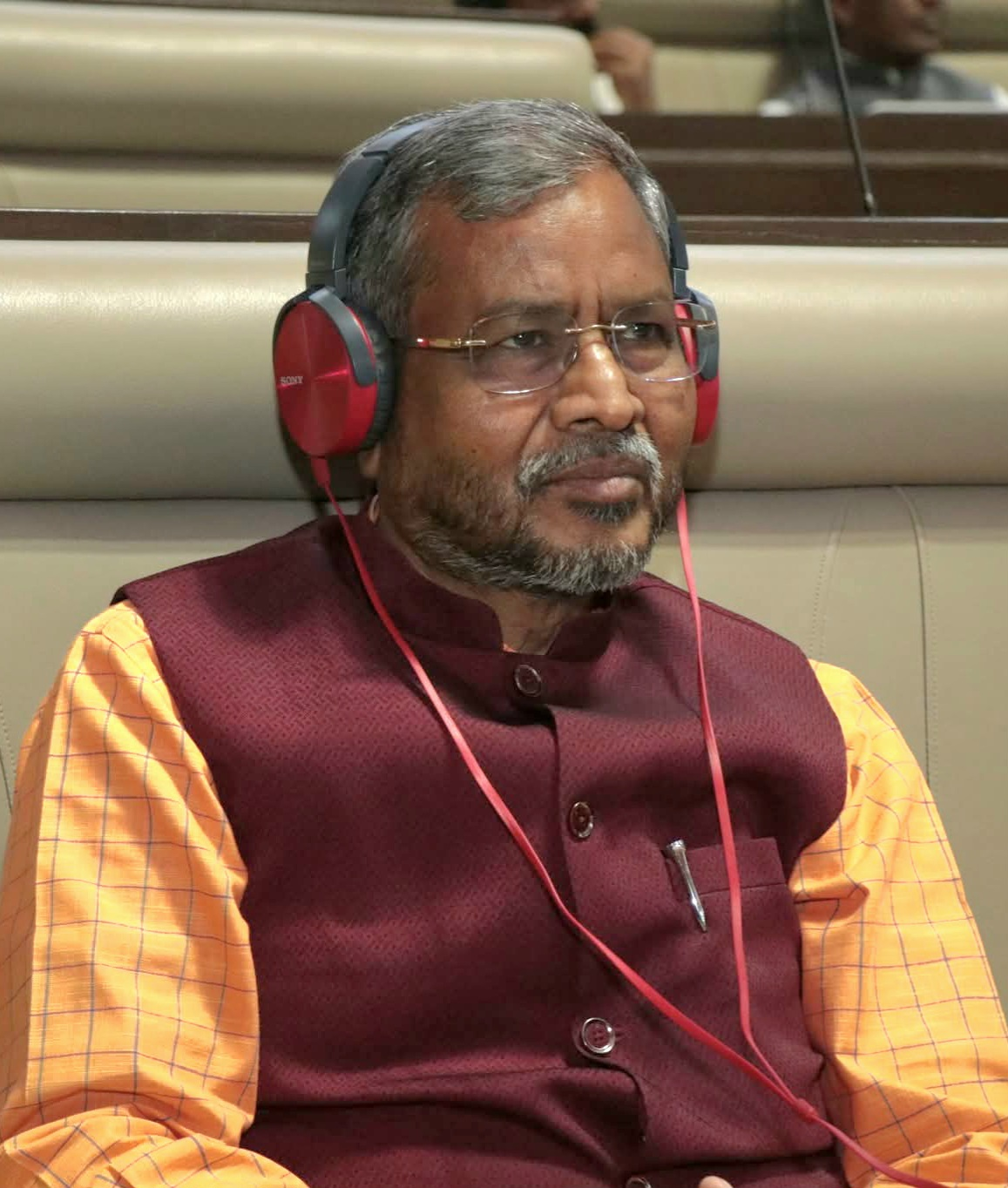
- Incumbent; Babulal Marandi since 6 March 2025
- Style: The Hon’ble
- Member of: Jharkhand Legislative Assembly
- Nominator: Members of the Official Opposition of the Legislative Assembly
- Appointer: Speaker of the Assembly
- Term length: 5 years Till the Assembly Continues
- Precursor: List of leaders of the opposition in the Bihar Legislative Assembly
- Inaugural holder: Stephen Marandi

The leader of the opposition in the Jharkhand Legislative Assembly is the politician who leads the official opposition in the Jharkhand Legislative Assembly. The current Jharkhand leader of the opposition is Babulal Marandi.

== Eligibility ==
Official Opposition is a term used in Jharkhand Legislative Assembly to designate the political party which has secured the second largest number of seats in the assembly. In order to get formal recognition, the party must have at least 10% of total membership of the Legislative Assembly. A single party has to meet the 10% seat criterion, not an alliance. Many of the other Indian state legislatures also follow this 10% rule while the rest of them prefer single largest opposition party according to the rules of their respective houses.

== Role ==
The opposition's main role is to question the government of the day and hold them accountable to the public. The opposition is equally responsible in upholding the best interests of the people of the country. They have to ensure that the Government does not take any steps, which might have negative effects on the people of the country.

The role of the opposition in legislature is basically to check the excesses of the ruling or dominant party, and not to be totally antagonistic. There are actions of the ruling party which may be beneficial to the masses and opposition is expected to support such steps.

In legislature, opposition party has a major role and must act to discourage the party in power from acting against the interests of the country and the common man. They are expected to alert the population and the Government on the content of any bill, which is not in the best interests of the country.

== Leaders of the opposition ==
Colour key for parties
Jharkhand Mukti Morcha
Bharatiya Janata Party
Indian National Congress

No	Portrait	Name	Constituency	Term			Assembly (election)	Party
1		Stephen Marandi	Dumka	24 November 2000	10 July 2004	3 years, 229 days	1st (2000 election)	Jharkhand Mukti Morcha
2		Haji Hussain Ansari	Madhupur	2 August 2004	1 March 2005	211 days	1st (2000 election)	Jharkhand Mukti Morcha
3		Sudhir Mahato	Ichagarh	16 March 2005	18 September 2006	1 year, 186 days	2nd (2005 election)	Jharkhand Mukti Morcha
4		Arjun Munda	Kharsawan	4 December 2006	29 May 2009	2 years, 176 days	2nd (2005 election)	Bharatiya Janata Party
5		Rajendra Prasad Singh	Bermo	7 January 2010	18 January 2013	3 years, 11 days	3rd (2009 election)	Indian National Congress
(4)		Arjun Munda	Kharsawan	19 July 2013	23 December 2014	1 year, 157 days	3rd (2009 election)	Bharatiya Janata Party
6		Hemant Soren	Barhait	7 January 2015	28 December 2019	4 years, 355 days	4th (2014 election)	Jharkhand Mukti Morcha
7		Babulal Marandi	Dhanwar	24 February 2020	16 October 2023	3 years, 234 days	5th (2019 election)	Bharatiya Janata Party
8		Amar Kumar Bauri	Chandankiyari	16 October 2023	23 November 2024	1 year, 38 days	5th (2019 election)	Bharatiya Janata Party
(7)		Babulal Marandi	Dhanwar	6 March 2025	Incumbent	1 year, 189 days	6th (2024 election)	Bharatiya Janata Party

== Statistics ==
List of leaders of the opposition by length of term

No.	Name	Party	Length of term	
No.	Name	Party	Longest continuous term	Total years of leaders of the opposition
1	Hemant Soren	JMM	4 years, 355 days	4 years, 355 days
2	Arjun Munda	BJP	2 years, 176 days	3 years, 333 days
3	Babulal Marandi	BJP	3 years, 307 days	3 years, 307 days
4	Stephen Marandi	JMM	3 years, 229 days	3 years, 229 days
5	Rajendra Prasad Singh	INC	3 years, 11 days	3 years, 11 days
6	Sudhir Mahato	JMM	1 year, 186 days	1 year, 186 days
7	Amar Kumar Bauri	BJP	1 year, 38 days	1 year, 38 days
8	Haji Hussain Ansari	JMM	211 days	211 days
(3)	Babulal Marandi	BJP	1 year, 189 days	1 year, 189 days

== See also ==
- Government of Jharkhand
- Governor of Jharkhand
- Chief Minister of Jharkhand
- Jharkhand Legislative Assembly
- Speaker of the Jharkhand Legislative Assembly
- Cabinet of Jharkhand
- Leader of the Opposition in the Parliament of India
- List of current Indian opposition leaders
