= List of speakers of the Jharkhand Legislative Assembly =

Jharkhand Legislative Assembly Speaker

Speaker of the Jharkhand Legislative Assembly
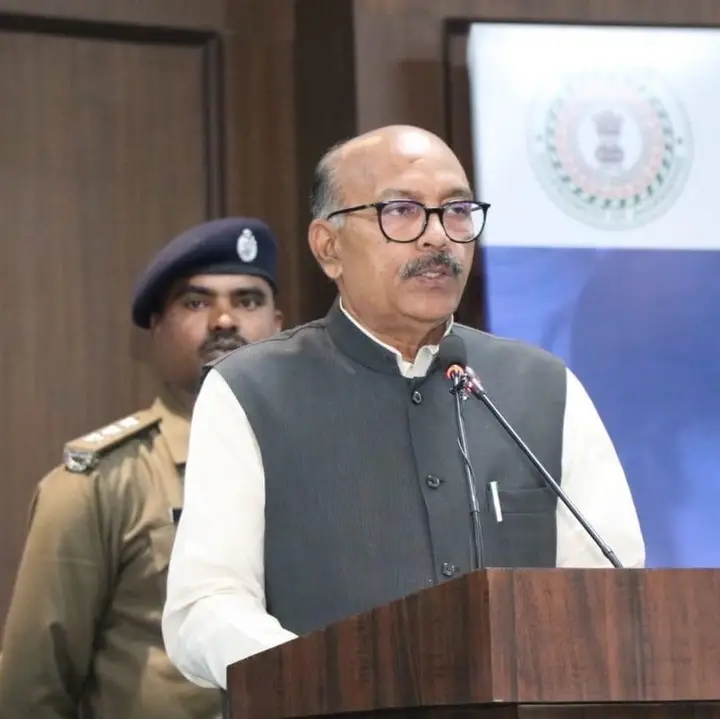
- Incumbent; Rabindra Nath Mahato since 6 January 2020
- Style: The Honourable
- Appointer: Members of the Jharkhand Legislative Assembly
- Term length: During the life of the Assembly (five years maximum)
- Precursor: List of speakers of the Bihar Legislative Assembly
- Inaugural holder: Inder Singh Namdhari (2000–2004)
- Formation: 22 November 2000; 25 years ago
- Deputy: Vacant
- Website: Jharkhand Legislative Assembly

The Speaker of the Jharkhand Legislative Assembly is the presiding officer of the Legislative Assembly of Jharkhand, the main law-making body for the Indian state of Jharkhand. The Speaker is elected in the very first meeting of the Jharkhand Legislative Assembly after the general elections for a term of 5 years from amongst the members of the assembly. Speakers holds office until ceasing to be a member of the assembly or resignation from the office. The Speaker can be removed from office by a resolution passed in the assembly by an effective majority of its members. In the absence of Speaker, the meeting of Jharkhand Legislative Assembly is presided by the Deputy Speaker.

Rabindra Nath Mahato is the current Speaker of the Jharkhand Legislative Assembly.

== Eligibility ==
Speaker of the Assembly must:

1. Be a citizen of India;
2. Not be less than 25 years of age; and
3. Not hold any office of profit under the Government of Jharkhand.

== Powers and functions of the Speaker ==
The speaker of the legislative assembly conducts the business in house, and decides whether a bill is a money bill or not. They maintain discipline and decorum in the house and can punish a member for their unruly behaviour by suspending them. They also permit the moving of various kinds of motions and resolutions such as a motion of no confidence, motion of adjournment, motion of censure and calling attention notice as per the rules. The speaker decides on the agenda to be taken up for discussion during the meeting. The date of election of the speaker is fixed by the Governor of Jharkhand. Further, all comments and speeches made by members of the House are addressed to the speaker. The speaker is answerable to the house. Both the speaker and deputy speaker may be removed by a resolution passed by the majority of the members.

== List of the Speakers ==
No.	Name	Constituency	Term			Assembly	Party
1	Inder Singh Namdhari	Daltonganj	22 November 2000	29 March 2004	3 years, 128 days	1st	Janata Dal (United)
Acting	Bagun Sumbrai	Chaibasa	29 March 2004	29 May 2004	61 days	1st	Indian National Congress
(1)	Inder Singh Namdhari	Daltonganj	4 June 2004	11 August 2004	68 days	1st	Janata Dal (United)
2	Mrigendra Pratap Singh	Jamshedpur West	18 August 2004	11 January 2005	146 days	1st	Bharatiya Janata Party
Acting	Saba Ahmad	Tundi	12 January 2005	1 March 2005	48 days	1st	Rashtriya Janata Dal
(1)	Inder Singh Namdhari	Daltonganj	15 March 2005	14 September 2006	1 year, 183 days	2nd	Janata Dal (United)
3	Alamgir Alam	Pakur	20 October 2006	26 December 2009	3 years, 67 days	2nd	Indian National Congress
4	Chandreshwar Prasad Singh	Ranchi	6 January 2010	19 July 2013	3 years, 194 days	3rd	Bharatiya Janata Party
5	Shashank Shekhar Bhokta	Sarath	25 July 2013	23 December 2014	1 year, 151 days	3rd	Jharkhand Mukti Morcha
6	Dinesh Oraon	Sisai	7 January 2015	24 December 2019	4 years, 351 days	4th	Bharatiya Janata Party
7	Rabindra Nath Mahato	Nala	6 January 2020	Incumbent	6 years, 248 days	5th	Jharkhand Mukti Morcha
7	Rabindra Nath Mahato	Nala	6 January 2020	Incumbent	6 years, 248 days	6th	Jharkhand Mukti Morcha

== Deputy Speaker ==
The Deputy Speaker of the Jharkhand Legislative Assembly is the second-highest-ranking officer of the Jharkhand Legislative Assembly. As of January 2026, the position is vacant.

Jharkhand has not filled this constitutional post for over 20 years, the longest such vacancy in India. The last incumbent was Saba Ahmed, who served briefly in early 2005.

#	Name	Constituency	Term			Assembly	Party
1	Bagun Sumbrai	Chaibasa	24 August 2002	29 May 2004	1 year, 279 days	1st	Indian National Congress
2	Saba Ahmed	Tundi	12 January 2005	6 March 2005	53 days	1st	Rashtriya Janata Dal
—	Vacant	—	6 March 2005	Present	21 years, 189 days		—

=== Notes ===
- Following the 2024 Jharkhand Legislative Assembly election, the 6th Jharkhand Assembly was formed, but the position of Deputy Speaker was not included in the initial leadership appointments.
- Rabindra Nath Mahato currently serves as the Speaker of the House.

== Pro tem Speaker ==
=== List of Pro tem Speakers ===
Stephen Marandi 2014, 2019 & 2024

== See also ==
- Government of Jharkhand
- Governor of Jharkhand
- Chief Minister of Jharkhand
- Jharkhand Legislative Assembly
- Leader of the Opposition in the Jharkhand Legislative Assembly
- Cabinet of Jharkhand
- Chief Justice of Jharkhand
- Speaker of the Lok Sabha
- Chairman of the Rajya Sabha
- List of current Indian legislative speakers and chairmen
