= Sabita Mahato =

Indian politician (born 1974)

Member of the Jharkhand Legislative Assembly
- Incumbent
- Assumed office 23 December 2019
- Preceded by: Sadhu Charan Mahato
- Constituency: Ichagarh

Personal details
- Born: 1974 (age 51–52) Chandil
- Spouse: Sudhir Mahato

Sabita Mahato (born 1974) is an Indian politician from Jharkhand. She is a Member of the Legislative Assembly (MLA) from Ichagarh Assembly constituency in Seraikela district representing Jharkhand Mukti Morcha. She won the 2019 Jharkhand Legislative Assembly election.

== Early life and education ==
Mahato is from Jamshedpur. She is the wife of late Sudhir Mahato, also an MLA and a former deputy chief minister. She discontinued her studies after Class 8 in 1991. She studied at Kandra High School, Kandra.

== Career ==
Mahato won the 2019 Jharkhand Legislative Assembly election from Ichagarh Assembly constituency on Jharkhand Mukti Morcha ticket. She polled 57,546 votes and defeated her nearest rival, Hare Lal Mahato of All Jharkhand Students Union by a margin of 18,710 votes. Earlier, her husband Sudhir Mahato won the 2005 Jharkhand Legislative Assembly election on JMM ticket but lost the next election in 2009. After his death, she contested the 2014 Assembly election without success.
