= Sudhir Mahato =

Indian politician

Deputy Chief Minister of Jharkhand
- In office 14 September 2006 – 23 August 2008
- Preceded by: Inaugural post-holder
- Succeeded by: Stephen Marandi
- Constituency: Ichagarh

Leader of Opposition Jharkhand Legislative Assembly
- In office 16 March 2005 – 14 September 2006
- Preceded by: Haji Hussain Ansari
- Succeeded by: Arjun Munda
- Constituency: Ichagarh

Member of the Jharkhand Legislative Assembly
- In office 2005–2009
- Preceded by: Arvind Kumar Singh
- Succeeded by: Arvind Kumar Singh
- Constituency: Ichagarh

Member of the Bihar Legislative Assembly
- In office 1990–1995
- Preceded by: Prabhat Kumar Aditya Deo
- Succeeded by: Arvind Kumar Singh
- Constituency: Ichagarh

Personal details
- Born: Sudhir Mahato; 1961
- Died: January 22, 2014
- Party: Jharkhand Mukti Morcha
- Spouse: Sabita Mahato

Sudhir Mahato was an Indian politician. He was elected to the Bihar Legislative Assembly and then Jharkhand Legislative Assembly from Ichagarh from 1990 Bihar Legislative Assembly election and 2005 Jharkhand Legislative Assembly election as a member of the Jharkhand Mukti Morcha. He was Deputy Chief Minister of Jharkhand under Madhu Koda from 14 September 2006 to 23 August 2008.

He died on 22 January 2014 due to a massive heart attack at Ghatsila in East Singhbhum district at the age of 53 years.
