= List of deputy chief ministers of Jharkhand =

Cabinet position in Jharkhand Government

Deputy Chief Minister of Jharkhand
- Incumbent; Vacant since 19 January 2013
- Abbreviation: DCM
- Member of: Government of Jharkhand
- Appointer: Governor of Jharkhand
- Precursor: Deputy Chief Minister of Bihar
- Inaugural holder: Sudhir Mahato
- Formation: 14 September 2006; 19 years ago

The deputy chief minister of Jharkhand is a part of the government of the eastern Indian state of Jharkhand.The position of deputy chief minister is not explicitly defined or mentioned in the Constitution of India. However, the Supreme Court of India has stated that the appointment of deputy chief ministers is not unconstitutional. The court has clarified that a deputy chief minister, for all practical purposes, remains a minister in the council of ministers headed by the chief minister and does not draw a higher salary or perks compared to other ministers.During the absence of the chief minister, the deputy-chief minister may chair cabinet meetings and lead the assembly majority. Various deputy chief ministers have also taken the oath of secrecy in line with the one that chief minister takes. This oath has also sparked controversies.

== Oath as the state deputy chief minister ==
The deputy chief minister serves five years in the office. The following is the oath of the Deputy chief minister of state:

I, <Name of Deputy Chief Minister>, do swear in the name of God/solemnly affirm that I will bear true faith and allegiance to the Constitution of India as by law established, that I will uphold the sovereignty and integrity of India, that I will faithfully and conscientiously discharge my duties as a Minister for the State of () and that I will do right to all manner of people in accordance with the Constitution and the law without fear or favour, affection or ill-will.

Oath of Secrecy

"I, [Name], do swear in the name of God / solemnly affirm that I will not directly or indirectly communicate or reveal to any person or persons any matter which shall be brought under my consideration or shall become known to me as a Minister for the State of [Name of State] except as may be required for the due discharge of my duties as such Minister."Pad ki Shapath (Oath of Office) "Main, [DCM ka Naam], Ishwar ki shapath leta hoon / satyanishtha se pratigyan karta hoon ki main vidhi dwara sthapit Bharat ke Samvidhan ke prati sachi shraddha aur nishtha rakhunga. Main Bharat ki prabhuta aur akhandta akshunn rakhunga. Main [State ka Naam] ke Rajya ke Upa Mukhya Mantri ke roop mein apne kartavyon ka shraddhapoorvak aur shuddh antahkaran se nirvahan karunga, tatha main bhay ya pakshpat, anurag ya dwesh ke bina, sabhi prakar ke logon ke prati Samvidhan aur vidhi ke anusar nyay karunga." B. Gopniyata ki Shapath (Oath of Secrecy) "Main, [DCM ka Naam], Ishwar ki shapath leta hoon / satyanishtha se pratigyan karta hoon ki jo vishay [State ka Naam] ke Rajya ke Mukhya Mantri ke roop mein mere vichar ke liye laya jayega athva mujhe gyaat hoga, use kisi vyakti ya vyaktityon ko, tab ke sivay jab ki aise UpaMukhya Mantri ke roop mein apne kartavyon ke uchit nirvahan ke liye aisa karna apekshit ho, main pratyaksh (directly) ya apratyaksh (indirectly) roop mein sansuchit ya prakat nahi karunga."

== Deputy chief ministers of Bihar ==
#	Portrait	Name	Constituency	Term of office			Chief Minister	Assembly (Election)	Party
1		Anugrah Narayan Sinha		2 April 1946	5 July 1957	11 years, 94 days	Shri Krishna Sinha	1st (1952)	Indian National Congress
1		Anugrah Narayan Sinha		2 April 1946	5 July 1957	11 years, 94 days	Shri Krishna Sinha	2nd (1957)	Indian National Congress
2		Karpoori Thakur	Tajpur	5 March 1967	28 January 1968	329 days	Mahamaya Prasad Sinha	4th (1967)	Socialist Party
3		Jagdeo Prasad	Kurtha	28 January 1968	1 February 1968	4 days	Satish Prasad Singh	4th (1967)	Shoshit Samaj Dal
4		Ram Jaipal Singh Yadav	Sonpur	3 June 1971	9 January 1972	220 days	Bhola Paswan Shastri	5th (1969)	Indian National Congress

==Keys==

Color key for the party of deputy chief ministers

- Jharkhand Mukti Morcha
- Indian National Congress
- All Jharkhand Students Union
- Bharatiya Janata Party
- Independent

== List of deputy chief ministers ==
Sr. No.	Name	Portrait	Term of office			Political Party	Chief Minister
1	Sudhir Mahato		14 September 2006	23 August 2008	1 year, 344 days	Jharkhand Mukti Morcha	Madhu Koda
2	Stephen Marandi		27 August 2008	18 January 2009	144 days	Indian National Congress	Shibu Soren
3	Sudesh Mahto		30 December 2009	31 May 2010	152 days	All Jharkhand Students Union	Shibu Soren
4	Raghubar Das		30 December 2009	31 May 2010	152 days	Bharatiya Janata Party	Shibu Soren
(3)	Sudesh Mahto		11 September 2010	18 January 2013	2 years, 129 days	All Jharkhand Students Union	Arjun Munda
5	Hemant Soren		11 September 2010	18 January 2013	2 years, 129 days	Jharkhand Mukti Morcha	Arjun Munda

== Statistics ==
List of deputy chief ministers by length of term

No.	Name	Party	Length of term	
No.	Name	Party	Longest continuous term	Total years of deputy chief ministership
1	Sudesh Mahato	AJSU	2 years, 129 days	2 years, 281 days
2	Hemant Soren	JMM	2 years, 129 days	2 years, 129 days
3	Sudhir Mahato	JMM	1 year, 344 days	1 year, 344 days
4	Raghubar Das	BJP	152 days	152 days
5	Stephen Marandi	INC	144 days	144 days
