= 2nd Jharkhand Assembly =

Unicameral legislature of the India state of Jharkhand

Jharkhand Legislative Assembly
- 2nd Jharkhand Assembly

Type
- Type: Unicameral
- Houses: Jharkhand Legislative Assembly
- Term limits: 5 years

History
- Founded: 2005
- Preceded by: 1st Jharkhand Assembly
- Succeeded by: 3rd Jharkhand Assembly

Leadership
- Speaker: -, -
- Leader of the House (Chief Minister): -, -

Structure
- Seats: 81
- Length of term: 2005-2009

Elections
- Voting system: First past the post
- Last election: 2000
- Next election: 2009

Website
- jharkhandvidhansabha.nic.in

2nd Jharkhand Assembly was constituted after the 2005 Jharkhand Legislative Assembly election. The 2005 election was the first Jharkhand state assembly election conducted in Jharkhand.

== Composition ==
| # | Party | Seats Won | Alliance |
|---|---|---|---|
| 1 | Bharatiya Janata Party | 30 | NDA |
| 2 | Jharkhand Mukti Morcha | 17 | UPA |
| 3 | Indian National Congress | 9 | UPA |
| 4 | Rashtriya Janata Dal | 7 | NONE |
| 5 | Janata Dal (United) | 6 | NDA |
| 6 | Independents | 3 | NONE |
| 7 | All India Forward Bloc | 2 | NONE |
| 7 | United Goans Democratic Party | 2 | NONE |
| 7 | All Jharkhand Students Union | 2 | NONE |
| 8 | Nationalist Congress Party | 1 | NONE |
| 8 | Communist Party of India (Marxist–Leninist) Liberation | 1 | NONE |
| 8 | Jharkhand Party | 1 | NONE |
| | Total | 81 | |
