= Arvind Kumar Singh =

Arvind Kumar Singh may refer to:

- Arvind Kumar Singh (Samajwadi Party politician), Indian politician from Uttar Pradesh, MLA for Ramnagar, and for Haidergarh
- Arvind Kumar Singh (Jharkhand politician), Indian politician from Jharkhand, MLA for Ichagarh
- Arvind Kumar Singh (Dadraul politician) (born 1983), Indian politician from Uttar Pradesh, MLA for Dadraul
