= Nirmal Mahato =

Indian Politician

Personal details
- Born: 25 December 1950 Jamshedpur, Bihar, India
- Died: 8 August 1987 (aged 36) Jamshedpur, Bihar, India
- Party: Jharkhand Mukti Morcha; All Jharkhand Students Union
- Education: Rail Shramik High school
- Profession: Activist; Politician

Nirmal Mahato (25 December 1950 – 8 August 1987) was an Indian politician, Jharkhand activist and prominent leader of Jharkhand Mukti Morcha. He was the founder of All Jharkhand Students Union. He was a prominent leader in the movement for separate state of Jharkhand.

== Early life ==
Nirmal Mahto ji was born on 25 December 1950 in Uliyan village of East Singhbhum district in Bihar(now in Jharkhand) to Jagbandhu Mahato. Nirmal Mahto had 9 siblings, including a sister. Nirmal Mahto did his secondary education and matriculation from Tata Workers Union High School Jamshedpur. After that Nirmal Mahto completed his graduation from Co-operative College Jamshedpur. Nirmal Mahto was a bright student in college and used to teach children. He belongs to the Kudmi Mahato community.

== Political career ==
In 1980, due to controversy, Shibu Soren and Binod Bihari Mahato drifted apart. A. K. Roy also left. Shibu Soren appointed Mahato as president and himself as general secretary of Jharkhand Mukti Morcha. Mahato perceived that to fight for Jharkhand with just support of Jharkhand Mukti Morcha will be difficult. For this a stronger movement was required and it was decided to form a student union of Jharkhand Mukti Morcha.

On 22 June 1986, on the line of All Assam Students Union, All Jharkhand Students Union was formed. Prabhakar Tirkey becomes the president and Surya Singh Besra, the general secretary. Mahato had a plan that all leaders and workers of AJSU should be trained in guerrilla warfare like revolutionary of Assam, Bodoland and Gorkhaland. He sent AJSU leaders to Assam and Gorkhaland.

=== Death ===
On 8 August 1987, Nirmal Mahato was murdered in Jamshedpur. He was allegedly shot by Birendra Singh and his brothers Dhirendra Singh (Pappu) and Narendra Singh (Pandit) at a private Chameria guest house. In August 2000, one of the three accused of murdering Mahato, Pappu Singh, surrendered in the court after 14 years. In 2001, Birendra Singh was sentenced to life imprisonment. JMM observes 8 August as martyrdom day.
