= Maheshpur Assembly constituency =

Maheshpur
- Constituency No. 6 for the Jharkhand Legislative Assembly

Constituency details
- Country: India
- Region: East India
- State: Jharkhand
- District: Pakur
- Lok Sabha constituency: Rajmahal Lok Sabha constituency
- Established: 2000
- Total electors: 216,533
- Reservation: ST

Member of Legislative Assembly
- 5th Jharkhand Legislative Assembly
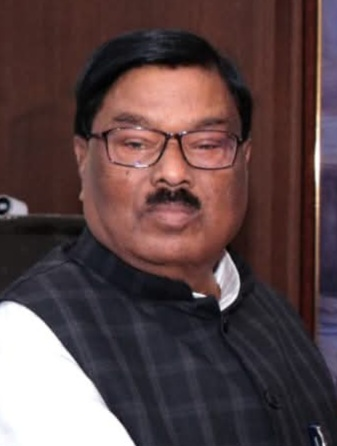
- Incumbent Stephen Marandi
- Party: JMM
- Alliance: MGB
- Elected year: 2024

The constituency of Maheshpur is electoral district in the Indian state of Jharkhand for the Vidhan Sabha, the lower house of the state's parliament.

The constituency includes Maheshpur and Pakuria Police Stations in Pakur district. This seat is reserved for Scheduled Tribes. and it lies within the Rajmahal constituency for elections to the Lok Sabha, India's national parliament.

== Members of Legislative Assembly ==
Election	Member	Party
Bihar Legislative Assembly
1952	Jitu Kisku	Jharkhand Party
1957-62: Constituency did not exist
1962	Joseph Murmu	Swatantra Party
1967	P. Hansdak	Independent politician
1969	Kaleshwar Hembrom	Bihar Prant Hul Jharkhand
1972	Kalidas Murmu	Indian National Congress
1977	Bishwanath Murmu	Janata Party
1980	Devidhan Besra	Jharkhand Mukti Morcha
1985	Devidhan Besra	Jharkhand Mukti Morcha
1990	Kalidas Murmu	Indian National Congress
1995	Jyotin Soren	Communist Party of India
2000	Devidhan Besra	Bharatiya Janata Party
Jharkhand Legislative Assembly
2005	Suphal Marandi	Jharkhand Mukti Morcha
2009	Mistry Soren	Jharkhand Vikas Morcha
2014	Stephen Marandi	Jharkhand Mukti Morcha
2019	Stephen Marandi	Jharkhand Mukti Morcha
2024	Stephen Marandi	Jharkhand Mukti Morcha

== Election results ==
=== Assembly Election 2024 ===
2024 Jharkhand Legislative Assembly election: Maheshpur
Party	Candidate	Votes	%	±%
JMM	Stephen Marandi	114,924	59.63%	▲5.69
BJP	Navneet Anthony Hembrom	53,749	27.89%	▼5.43
CPI(M)	Gopin Soren	5,329	2.76%	▼0.37
Bhartiya Azad Sena	Mistry Soren	5,031	2.61%	New
SP	Daud Marandi	2,644	1.37%	New
Independent	Rephaeel Murmu	2,305	1.20%	New
Independent	Stefan Marandi	1,566	0.81%	New
NOTA	None of the Above	1,304	0.68%	▼0.50
Margin of victory		61,175	31.74%	▲11.11
Turnout		1,92,744	80.28%	▲3.91
Registered electors		2,40,084		▲10.88
JMM hold		Swing	▲5.69	

=== Assembly Election 2019 ===
2019 Jharkhand Legislative Assembly election: Maheshpur
Party	Candidate	Votes	%	±%
JMM	Stephen Marandi	89,197	53.94%	▲21.69
BJP	Mistry Soren	55,091	33.31%	▲4.89
CPI(M)	Gopin Soren	5,176	3.13%	▼2.34
JVM(P)	Shivdhan Hembrom	2,860	1.73%	▼17.72
AJSU	Suphal Marandi	2,706	1.64%	New
Independent	Stefan Marandi	1,551	0.94%	New
JPP	Origanesh Hembrom	1,360	0.82%	New
NOTA	Nota	1,939	1.17%	▼0.40
Margin of victory		34,106	20.62%	▲16.80
Turnout		1,65,366	76.37%	▼3.51
Registered electors		2,16,533		▲7.54
JMM hold		Swing	▲21.69	

=== Assembly Election 2014 ===
2014 Jharkhand Legislative Assembly election: Maheshpur
Party	Candidate	Votes	%	±%
JMM	Stephen Marandi	51,866	32.25%	New
BJP	Devidhan Tudu	45,710	28.42%	▲3.08
JVM(P)	Mistry Soren	31,276	19.45%	▼25.25
CPI(M)	Gamelina Soren	8,798	5.47%	▲2.28
INC	Devilal Murmu	5,814	3.61%	New
Independent	Dijen Hembrom	4,782	2.97%	New
SP	Daud Marandi	3,717	2.31%	New
NOTA	None of the Above	2,527	1.57%	New
Margin of victory		6,156	3.83%	▼15.53
Turnout		1,60,839	79.88%	▲14.81
Registered electors		2,01,344		▲15.41
JMM gain from JVM(P)		Swing	▼12.45	

=== Assembly Election 2009 ===
2009 Jharkhand Legislative Assembly election: Maheshpur
Party	Candidate	Votes	%	±%
JVM(P)	Mistry Soren	50,746	44.70%	New
BJP	Devidhan Tudu	28,772	25.34%	▼4.81
AITC	Durga Marandi	15,840	13.95%	New
CPI(M)	Gopin Soren	3,616	3.19%	▼4.68
Independent	Daud Marandi	2,625	2.31%	New
Independent	Stefan Marandi	1,879	1.66%	New
RSP	Ameliya Hansda	1,807	1.59%	New
Margin of victory		21,974	19.36%	▲7.54
Turnout		1,13,529	65.07%	▲2.39
Registered electors		1,74,460		▲0.85
JVM(P) gain from JMM		Swing	▲2.72	

=== Assembly Election 2005 ===
2005 Jharkhand Legislative Assembly election: Maheshpur
Party	Candidate	Votes	%	±%
JMM	Suphal Marandi	45,520	41.98%	▲21.50
BJP	Debidhan Besra	32,704	30.16%	▲4.76
AJSU	Mistry Soren	13,812	12.74%	New
CPI(M)	Gopin Soren	8,525	7.86%	▼1.02
JDP	Ismail Soren	2,686	2.48%	New
BSP	Shreechand Tudu	2,139	1.97%	New
Independent	Junesh Murmu	1,851	1.71%	New
Margin of victory		12,816	11.82%	▲6.90
Turnout		1,08,444	62.69%	▲6.41
Registered electors		1,72,991		▲16.91
JMM gain from BJP		Swing	▲16.58	

=== Assembly Election 2000 ===
2000 Bihar Legislative Assembly election: Maheshpur
Party	Candidate	Votes	%	±%
BJP	Devidhan Besra	21,145	25.39%	New
JMM	Sufal Marandi	17,050	20.48%	New
INC	Navinlal Soren	16,336	19.62%	New
Independent	Durga Marandi	12,378	14.86%	New
CPI(M)	Jyotin Soren	7,393	8.88%	New
Independent	Mistry Soren	4,190	5.03%	New
Independent	Kandna Hembrom	2,064	2.48%	New
Margin of victory		4,095	4.92%	
Turnout		83,270	57.01%	
Registered electors		1,47,972		
BJP win (new seat)				

== See also ==
- Maheshpur block
- Pakuria block
- List of states of India by type of legislature
