= 3rd Jharkhand Assembly =

Legislative Assembly of Jharkhand

Type
- Type: Unicameral
- Houses: Jharkhand Legislative Assembly
- Term limits: 2009-2014

History
- Founded: 2009
- Preceded by: 2nd Jharkhand Assembly
- Succeeded by: 4th Jharkhand Assembly

Structure
- Seats: 82 (81 directly elected, 1 nominated)
- Political groups: BJP (18) JMM (18); INC (13); JVM (P) (11); AJSU (6); Others (6); RJD (5); JD (U) (2); Independent (2) Nominated (1)
- Length of term: 5 years

Meeting place
- Old Secretariat

Website
- jharkhandvidhansabha.nic.in

The Jharkhand Vidhan Sabha (Hindi: झारखंड विधान सभा) or the Jharkhand Legislative Assembly is the unicameral state legislature of Jharkhand state in eastern India. The seat of the Vidhan Sabha is at Ranchi, the capital of the state. The Vidhan Sabha comprises 81 Members of Legislative Assembly, directly elected from single-seat constituencies.

Speaker Of The House : Shashank Shekhar Bhokta Leader of the House: Hemant Soren Leader of the Opposition: Arjun Munda Minister of Parliamentary Affairs: Rajendra Prasad Singh Secretary-in-charge: Kaushal Kishore Prasad

== List of assemblies ==
Assembly	Duration	Winning party/Coalition	Chief Minister
1st	2000–2005		Babulal Marandi; Arjun Munda
2nd	2005–2009	Jharkhand Mukti Morcha; Bharatiya Janata Party	Shibu Soren; Arjun Munda; Madhu Koda
3rd	2009–2014	Jharkhand Mukti Morcha; Indian National Congress; Rashtriya Janata Dal	Hemant Soren

== Composition ==
Current assembly elections were held in the year 2009. Following is the final seat tally:

Party	Flag	Seats won
Indian National Congress +		13
Bharatiya Janata Party		18
Jharkhand Mukti Morcha		18
Others		20
Nominated		1

== See also ==
- List of chief ministers of Jharkhand
- Vidhan Sabha
- List of states of India by type of legislature
