= Kumar Jaimangal =

Indian politician

Member of the Jharkhand Legislative Assembly
- Incumbent
- Assumed office 10 November 2020
- Preceded by: Rajendra Prasad Singh
- Constituency: Bermo

Personal details
- Party: Indian National Congress
- Profession: Politician

Kumar Jaimangal (Anup Singh) is an Indian politician from Jharkhand. He is a member of the Jharkhand Legislative Assembly from 2024, representing Bermo Assembly constituency as a member of the Indian National Congress. In 2020, he won Bermo Assembly By-election.

== See also ==
- List of chief ministers of Jharkhand
- Maharashtra Legislative Assembly
