= Dhananjay Mahato =

Indian politician

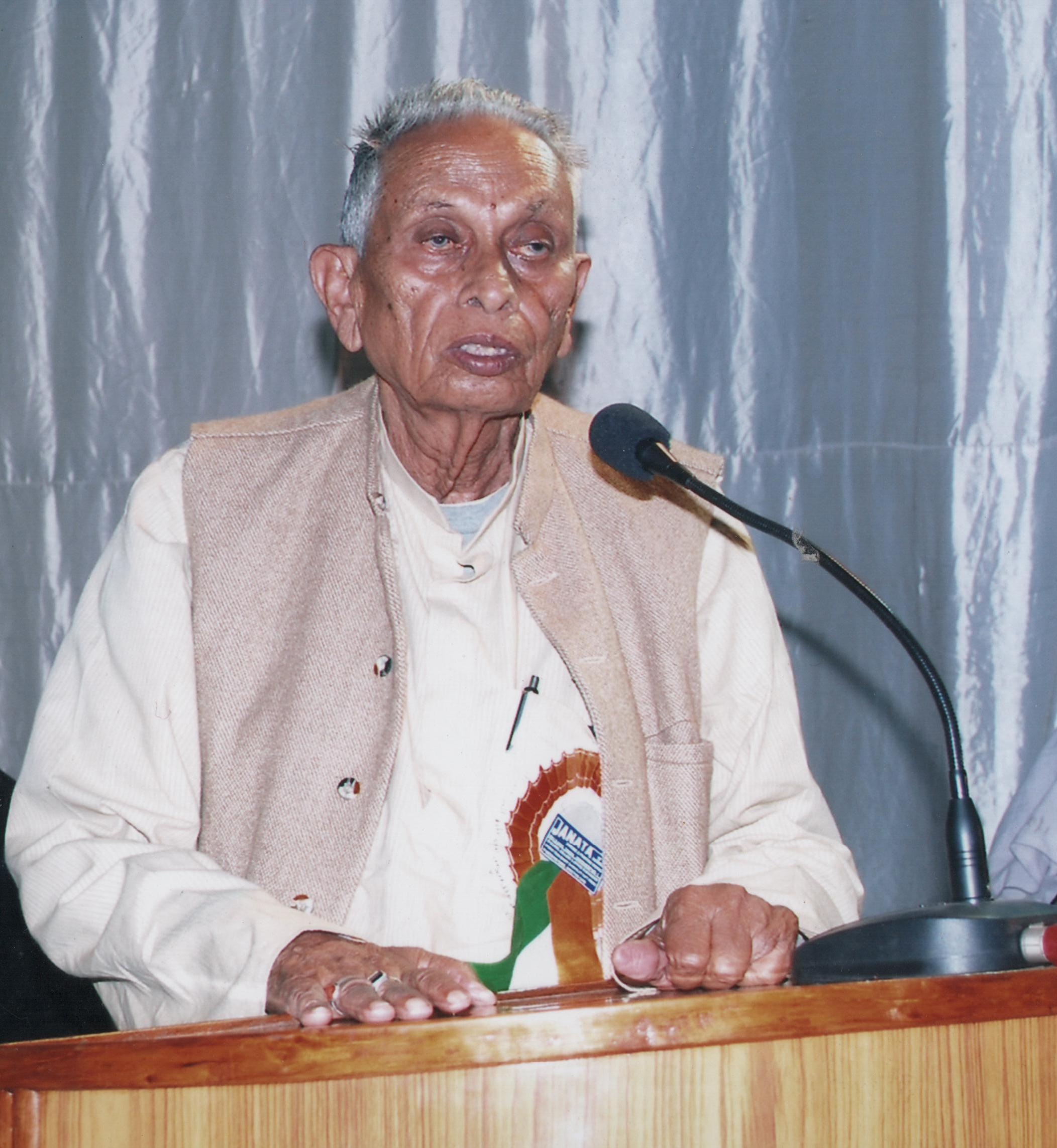
- Constituency: Ichagarh

Personal details
- Born: 8 August 1919 Gunda, Bihar, British India
- Died: 2 January 2014 (aged 94) Chandil, Jharkhand
- Party: Indian National Congress
- Profession: Politician; Social Worker

Dhananjay Mahato (8 August 1919 – 2 January 2014) was a freedom fighter and social activist who turned politician and later chairman of Adityapur Industrial Area Development Authority, Jamshedpur. He was elected as Member of the Legislative Assembly from Ichagarh constituency and Member of Bihar Legislative Council. He was a member of All India Congress Committee.

== Early life ==
Dhananjay Mahato was born on 8 August 1919 in a Kudmi Mahato family to Kshetra Mohan Mahato and Ratuli Devi in Gunda, a small village located in the Singhbhum District of Jharkhand (erstwhile Bihar, British India). Since childhood he was sagacious towards education. He completed his primary education in the village school and later for higher education he attended Lakhanpur High School in Purulia District of West Bengal. Soft-Spoken Dhananjay was gentle amongst the schoolmates and his fellow countrymen but at the same time he was a strong protester of the British Raj.

== Revolutionary ==
During the school days he came under the influence of well renowned freedom fighter of the region Bheem Chandra Mahato who gave him initiation and motivated towards the freedom struggle. In 1935, at the age of 16 he joined the Freedom struggle movement. Together with his revolutionary team he started campaigning for the awareness among the people to launch an agitation against the British government. In April, 1936 he sustained serious injuries by the police while preparing for the rally to boycott the British products in Purulia Town (West Bengal).This incident didn’t shattered him instead he turned more seditious and participated with more energy and enthusiasm in the freedom struggle movement. In September 1942, when the Quit India Movement was already launched, a group of 21 revolutionaries led by Bheem Chandra Mahato and Dhananjay Mahato set ablaze the British flag and later the BaraBazar police station. Held on this charge he got arrested by the British on 3 October 1942 and remained imprisoned until 17 April 1943 in Purulia Jail. In 1943 with dozens of his colleague, he marched from Patamda to Ramgarh to attend All-India Congress Committee’s convention chaired by Netaji Subash Chandra Bose.

== Post-Independence ==
After the independence of India he totally devoted himself towards the social service for the region. In 1956 Dhananjay Mahato led a large movement against the States Reorganisation Act when Manbhum district was partitioned between Bihar and West Bengal. After joining Indian National Congress Party, in 1957 he was elected as MLA from Ichagarh Vidhan Sabha and in 1976 he became member of Bihar Legislative Council. In 1977, he called the attention of the revenue and land reforms minister Upendra Verma for an inclusive and sustainable developmental model for the Resettlement and rehabilitation of the displaced people due to the Subernarekha Dam which was being constructed in Chandil which would inundate hundreds of villages and displace lakhs of people. Later, from 1984 to 1990 he was the chairman of Adityapur Industrial Area Development Authority. During the tenure of then Chief Minister of Bihar Jagannath Mishra, he built the Gunda Bihar Railway Station. He was the Founding Member of Singhbhum College Chandil, Raghunathpur High School and many other educational institutes.

== Death ==
Dhananjay Mahato died at the age of 94 on 2 January 2014 in his Chandil residence.
