= Yogeshwar Mahto =

Indian politician

Member of the Jharkhand Legislative Assembly
- In office 2014–2019
- Preceded by: Rajendra Prasad Singh
- Succeeded by: Rajendra Prasad Singh
- Constituency: Bermo
- In office 2005–2009
- Preceded by: Rajendra Prasad Singh
- Succeeded by: Rajendra Prasad Singh
- Constituency: Bermo

Personal details
- Party: Bharatiya Janata Party

Yogeshwar Mahto is an Indian politician from Jharkhand from the Bhartiya Janata Party. In 2014 he was elected as a member of the Jharkhand Legislative Assembly from Bermo constituency. He lost in the 2019 Assembly elections to Rajendra Prasad Singh.
