= Bermo Assembly constituency =

Vidhan Sabha constituency in Jharkhand

Coordinates: 23.79°N 85.94°E

Bermo
- Constituency No. 35 for the Jharkhand Legislative Assembly

Constituency details
- Country: India
- Region: East India
- State: Jharkhand
- District: Bokaro
- Lok Sabha constituency: Giridih
- Established: 2000
- Total electors: 3,12,507

Member of Legislative Assembly
- 5th Jharkhand Legislative Assembly
- Incumbent Kumar Jaimangal
- Party: INC
- Alliance: MGB
- Elected year: 2024

Bermo Assembly constituency is an assembly constituency in the Indian state of Jharkhand. The current MLA is Indian National Congress's Kumar Jaimangal Singh alias Anup Singh.

== Members of the Legislative Assembly ==
Election	Member	Party
Bihar Legislative Assembly
Before 1957: Constituency did not exist
1957	Brajeshwar Prasad Singh	Chota Nagpur Santhal Parganas Janata Party
1962	Bindeshwari Dubey	Indian National Congress
1967	Bindeshwari Dubey	Indian National Congress
1969	Bindeshwari Dubey	Indian National Congress
1972	Bindeshwari Dubey	Indian National Congress
1977	Mithilesh Kumar Sinha	Janata Party
1980	Ramdas Singh	Bharatiya Janata Party
1985	Rajendra Prasad Singh	Indian National Congress
1990	Rajendra Prasad Singh	Indian National Congress
1995	Rajendra Prasad Singh	Indian National Congress
2000	Rajendra Prasad Singh	Indian National Congress
Jharkhand Legislative Assembly
2005	Yogeshwar Mahto	Bharatiya Janata Party
2009	Rajendra Prasad Singh	Indian National Congress
2014	Yogeshwar Mahto	Bharatiya Janata Party
2019	Rajendra Prasad Singh	Indian National Congress
2020^	Kumar Jaimangal	Indian National Congress
2024	Kumar Jaimangal	Indian National Congress

^by-election

== Election results ==
=== Assembly election 2024 ===
2024 Jharkhand Legislative Assembly election: Bermo
Party	Candidate	Votes	%	±%
INC	Kumar Jaimangal	90,246	40.34	▼10.15
JLKM	Jairam Kumar Mahato	60,871	27.21	New
BJP	Ravindra Kumar Pandey	58,352	26.08	▼16.77
Independent	Lalit Narayan	5,320	2.38	New
Independent	Ruplal Thakur	1,863	0.83	New
ASP(KR)	Manzoor Alam	1,522	0.68	New
NOTA	None of the Above	2,443	1.09	▼0.04
Margin of victory		29,375	13.13	▲5.49
Turnout		2,23,718	68.06	▲8.47
Registered electors		3,28,688		▲5.18
INC hold		Swing	▼10.15	

=== Assembly by-election 2020 ===
2020 Jharkhand Legislative Assembly by-election: Bermo
Party	Candidate	Votes	%	±%
INC	Kumar Jaimangal	94,022	50.49	▲3.61
BJP	Yogeshwar Mahto	79,797	42.85	▲9.24
BSP	Lal Chand Mahto	4,281	2.30	New
CPI	Baidya Nath Mahto	2,643	1.42	▼1.58
Independent	Sunita Tudu	2,540	1.36	New
Independent	Dwarka Prasad Lala	1,439	0.77	New
NOTA	Nota	2,108	1.13	▲0.63
Margin of victory		14,225	7.64	▼5.63
Turnout		1,86,223	60.26	▼1.34
Registered electors		3,12,507		▲0.36
INC hold		Swing	▲3.61	

=== Assembly election 2019 ===
2019 Jharkhand Legislative Assembly election: Bermo
Party	Candidate	Votes	%	±%
INC	Rajendra Prasad Singh	88,945	46.88	▲10.62
BJP	Yogeshwar Mahto	63,773	33.61	▼9.38
AJSU	Kashi Nath Singh	16,546	8.72	New
CPI	Md. Aftab Alam Khan	5,695	3.00	▲1.33
JVM(P)	Ram Kinkar Pandey	1,997	1.05	▼6.36
Jharkhand Party (Secular)	Sabita Devi	1,806	0.95	New
Independent	Khirodhar Kisku	1,494	0.79	New
NOTA	None of the Above	961	0.51	New
Margin of victory		25,172	13.27	▲6.53
Turnout		1,89,734	60.93	▼4.47
Registered electors		3,11,390		▲8.78
INC gain from BJP		Swing	▲3.89	

=== Assembly election 2014 ===
2014 Jharkhand Legislative Assembly election: Bermo
Party	Candidate	Votes	%	±%
BJP	Yogeshwar Mahto	80,489	42.99	▲13.67
INC	Rajendra Prasad Singh	67,876	36.25	▲2.22
JVM(P)	Kashi Nath Singh	13,880	7.41	New
JMM	Hira Lal Manjhi	11,543	6.17	▼4.42
CPI	Chandrashekhar Jha	3,137	1.68	▼12.97
JP(S)	Satyendra Kumar Chauhan	1,267	0.68	New
Independent	Pankaj Prasad	1,252	0.67	New
NOTA	None of the Above	3,214	1.72	New
Margin of victory		12,613	6.74	▲2.02
Turnout		1,87,224	65.40	▲5.67
Registered electors		2,86,264		▲21.88
BJP gain from INC		Swing	▲8.96	

=== Assembly election 2009 ===
2009 Jharkhand Legislative Assembly election: Bermo
Party	Candidate	Votes	%	±%
INC	Rajendra Prasad Singh	47,744	34.03	▲6.33
BJP	Yogeshwar Mahto	41,133	29.32	▼5.25
CPI	Md. Aftab Alam Khan	20,549	14.65	▼6.51
JMM	Kashi Nath Singh	14,855	10.59	New
AJSU	Digambar Mahto	2,506	1.79	New
BSP	Baijnath Besra	1,519	1.08	▼0.21
Independent	Deepak Kumar Jaiswal	1,513	1.08	New
Margin of victory		6,611	4.71	▼2.16
Turnout		1,40,304	59.74	▲5.41
Registered electors		2,34,875		▼7.28
INC gain from BJP		Swing	▼0.54	

=== Assembly election 2005 ===
2005 Jharkhand Legislative Assembly election: Bermo
Party	Candidate	Votes	%	±%
BJP	Yogeshwar Mahto	47,569	34.57	▲12.41
INC	Rajendra Prasad Singh	38,108	27.69	▲15.64
CPI	Md. Aftab Alam Khan	29,116	21.16	▲7.63
Communist Party of India (Marxist Leninist) Liberation	Dinesh Singh	5,895	4.28	▲1.72
Independent	Binod Kumar	1,936	1.41	New
BSP	Jatal Mahto	1,772	1.29	New
SAP	Chhedi Nonia	1,729	1.26	▼1.34
Margin of victory		9,461	6.88	▼1.75
Turnout		1,37,602	54.32	▼1.12
Registered electors		2,53,307		▲13.21
BJP hold		Swing	▲12.41	

=== Assembly election 2000 ===
2000 Bihar Legislative Assembly election: Bermo
Party	Candidate	Votes	%	±%
BJP	Ramadhar Singh	27,494	22.16	New
CPI	Shafique Khan	16,788	13.53	New
INC	Rajendra Prasad Singh	14,957	12.06	New
JMM	Ful Chand Soren	14,941	12.04	New
RJD	Basant Singh	6,848	5.52	New
SAP	Binod Mahto	3,216	2.59	New
Communist Party of India (Marxist Leninist) Liberation	Parmeswar Mahto	3,187	2.57	New
Margin of victory		10,706	8.63	
Turnout		1,24,066	56.20	
Registered electors		2,23,759		
BJP win (new seat)				

== See also ==
- Vidhan Sabha
- List of states of India by type of legislature
