= Stephen Marandi =

Indian politician

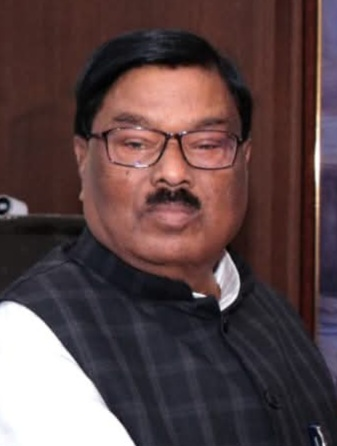
- Marandi in 2024

Member of the Jharkhand Legislative Assembly
- Incumbent
- Assumed office 2014
- Preceded by: Mistry Soren
- Constituency: Maheshpur
- In office 1980–2009
- Preceded by: Mahadeo Marandi
- Succeeded by: Hemant Soren
- Constituency: Dumka

2nd Deputy Chief Minister of Jharkhand
- In office 27 August 2008 – 18 January 2009
- Chief Minister: Shibu Soren
- Preceded by: Sudhir Mahato
- Succeeded by: Sudesh Mahto

Personal details
- Party: Jharkhand Mukti Morcha

Stephen Marandi (born 1953) is an Indian politician from Jharkhand. He is a leader of Jharkhand Mukti Morcha and a member of Jharkhand Legislative Assembly. He served as a pro tem speaker of the fourth and sixth Jharkhand Legislative Assembly.

== Early life and education ==
Marandi is a tribal leader from Dumka, Santhal Pargana. He is the son of late Mangal Marandi. He completed his M.A. in 1976 and LLB in 1978 at Bhagalpur University.

== Career ==
Marandi was member of Shibu Soren's Jharkhand Mukti Morcha. He quit Jharkhand Mukti Morcha due to denial of ticket in 2005 Jharkhand Legislative Assembly election and contested as Independent candidate from Dumka constituency against Shibu Soren's son Hemant Soren and defeated him in the election.

In 2005, when former Chief Minister of Jharkhand Babulal Marandi quit Bharatiya Janata Party, he joined Babulal Marandi to form Jharkhand Vikas Morcha (Prajatantrik).

Soon after formation of Jharkhand Vikas Morcha (Prajatantrik), he quit the party and joined hands with Madhu Koda headed government and joined the Indian National Congress soon after. He was also named as Deputy Chief Minister of Jharkhand.

In April 2015, he returned to Jharkhand Vikas Morcha (Prajatantrik) to be re-united with Babulal Marandi. He won 2014 Jharkhand Legislative Assembly election from Maheshpur constituency on Jharkhand Mukti Morcha.

On 12 December 2017, the Bharatiya Janata Party called for Marandi's suspension for organizing a kissing contest for tribal couples in Pakur.
