= Rajendra Prasad Singh (Bihar and Jharkhand politician) =

Indian politician (1945–2020)

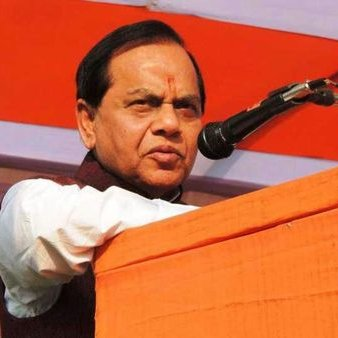

Member of the Jharkhand Legislative Assembly
- In office 2019–2020
- Preceded by: Yogeshwar Mahto
- Succeeded by: Kumar Jaimangal
- Constituency: Bermo
- In office 2009–2014
- Preceded by: Yogeshwar Mahto
- Succeeded by: Yogeshwar Mahto
- Constituency: Bermo
- In office 1985–2005
- Preceded by: Ramdas Singh
- Succeeded by: Yogeshwar Mahto
- Constituency: Bermo

Leader of Opposition in Jharkhand Legislative Assembly
- In office 7 January 2010 – 18 January 2013
- Preceded by: Arjun Munda
- Succeeded by: Arjun Munda

Personal details
- Died: 24 May 2020 New Delhi, India
- Party: Indian National Congress
- Children: Kumar Jaimangal, Kumar Gaurav and 8 daughters
- Parent: Bhuwneshwar Prasad Singh

Rajendra Prasad Singh (Rajender Babu) was an Indian politician from Bihar and Jharkhand. He was member of the Indian National Congress. He was elected as a member of the Jharkhand Legislative Assembly from Bermo in 2019.

He was the leader of the opposition in the Jharkhand Legislative Assembly from 2010 to 2013, when Arjun Munda was chief minister of Jharkhand. Rajender Babu has been a minister in Bihar and Jharkhand. The multiple-time MLA from Bermo constituency began his political career in 1963 and went on to become the Indian National Trade Union Congress (Intuc) national general secretary, the president of the Rastriya Colliery Mazdoor Sangh and an All India Congress Committee member.

== Death ==
Mr Singh was suffering from a lung infection and died at the private hospital in New Delhi on 24 May 2020. His son Kumar Jaimangal became MLA from Bermo assembly.
