= Sudesh Mahto =

Indian politician

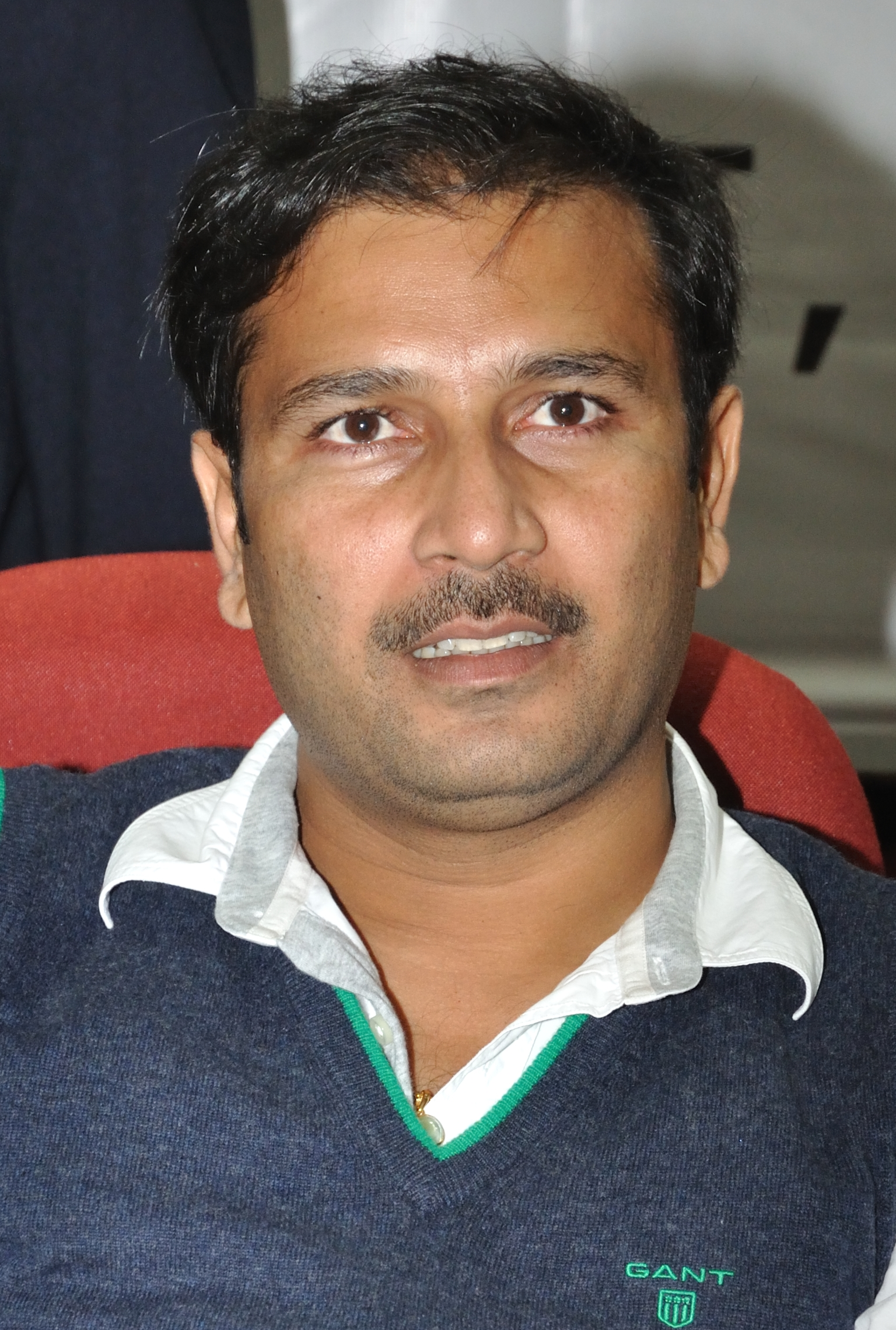
- Mahto in 2010

Deputy Chief Minister of Jharkhand
- In office 11 September 2010 – 18 January 2013 Serving with Hemant Soren
- Chief Minister: Arjun Munda
- Preceded by: President's rule
- Succeeded by: President's rule
- In office 30 December 2009 – 29 May 2010 Serving with Raghubar Das
- Chief Minister: Shibu Soren
- Preceded by: President's rule
- Succeeded by: President's rule

Member of the Jharkhand Legislative Assembly
- In office 23 December 2019 – 23 November 2024
- Preceded by: Seema Devi
- Succeeded by: Amit Mahato
- Constituency: Silli
- In office 15 November 2000 – 23 December 2014
- Preceded by: Keshav Mahto Kamlesh
- Succeeded by: Amit Mahato
- Constituency: Silli

President of AJSU Party
- Incumbent
- Assumed office 2007

Personal details
- Born: 21 June 1974 (age 52) Silli, Bihar (present–day Jharkhand), India
- Party: AJSU Party
- Spouse: Neha Mahto
- Children: 2

Sudesh Mahto is an Indian politician from Jharkhand. He has served twice as the Deputy Chief Minister of Jharkhand. He has also held several key portfolios, including that of the Home Minister of Jharkhand. He is considered a popular youth icon in India.

== Political career ==
He played a decisive role in Jharkhand statehood movement. He notably declined an offer of ministry from Lalu Prasad Yadav and instead demanded a separate state of Jharkhand.

He is the President of AJSU Party and is popularly regarded as “Boss" by followers & “King Maker" by political pundits. His close associates include - Chandra Prakash Choudhary, Deosharan Bhagat, Praveen Prabhakar, Ram Chandra Sahis, Lambodar Mahto and Nirmal Mahato Alais Tiwari Mahto.

Sudesh Mahto has close ties with Narendra Modi and Amit Shah. He is also friends with MS Dhoni and is often seen on shared platforms playing cricket and football matches.

Mahto has four times represented Silli constituency in Jharkhand Legislative Assembly. He is famous for his Silli Model of development. He is also known for his women centric development at grassroot level.

To preserve the identity and history of Jharkhand, Mahto had announced to build a statue of Birsa Munda, known as the Statue of Ulgulan, and a statue of Jharkhand movement leader Binod Bihari Mahato, known as the Statue of Revolution. However, both projects are yet to be finalized.

He runs the Birsa Munda Archery Academy in Silli, which received the President's Award in 2016. The academy has produced accomplished archers, including Madhumita Kumari, who won a silver medal for India at the Asian Games.

== Electoral history ==
=== Legislative Assembly elections ===
Year	Constituency	Party	Votes	%	Result
2000	Silli	UGDP	40,322	44.69	Won
2005	Silli	AJSU	39,281	27.71	Won
2009	Silli	AJSU	45,673	38.99	Won
2014	Silli	AJSU	50,007	34.92	Lost
2018^	Silli	AJSU	63,619	43.13	Lost
2019	Silli	AJSU	83,700	52.74	Won
2024	Silli	AJSU	49,302	28.24	Lost

^by-election
