= Ichagarh Assembly constituency =

Constituency of the Jharkhand legislative assembly in India

Coordinates: 23.046°N 85.934°E

Ichagarh
- Constituency No. 50 for the Jharkhand Legislative Assembly

Constituency details
- Country: India
- Region: East India
- State: Jharkhand
- District: Seraikela Kharsawan
- Lok Sabha constituency: Ranchi
- Established: 2000
- Total electors: 260,120
- Reservation: None

Member of Legislative Assembly
- 6th Jharkhand Legislative Assembly
- Incumbent Sabita Mahato
- Party: JMM
- Alliance: MGB
- Elected year: 2024

Ichagarh Assembly constituency is an Assembly constituency in the Indian state of Jharkhand.

Most successful parties after separate Jharkhand state.
1. JMM (60.0%)
2. JVM (20.0%)
3. BJP (20.0%)

== Overview ==
According to the Delimitation of Parliamentary and Assembly Constituencies Order, 2008 of the Election Commission of India, Ichagarh Assembly constituency covers Ichagarh, Chandil and Nimdih police stations. It is an open constituency. Ichagarh Assembly constituency is part of Ranchi (Lok Sabha constituency). Sabita Mahato is the current MLA representing the constituency.

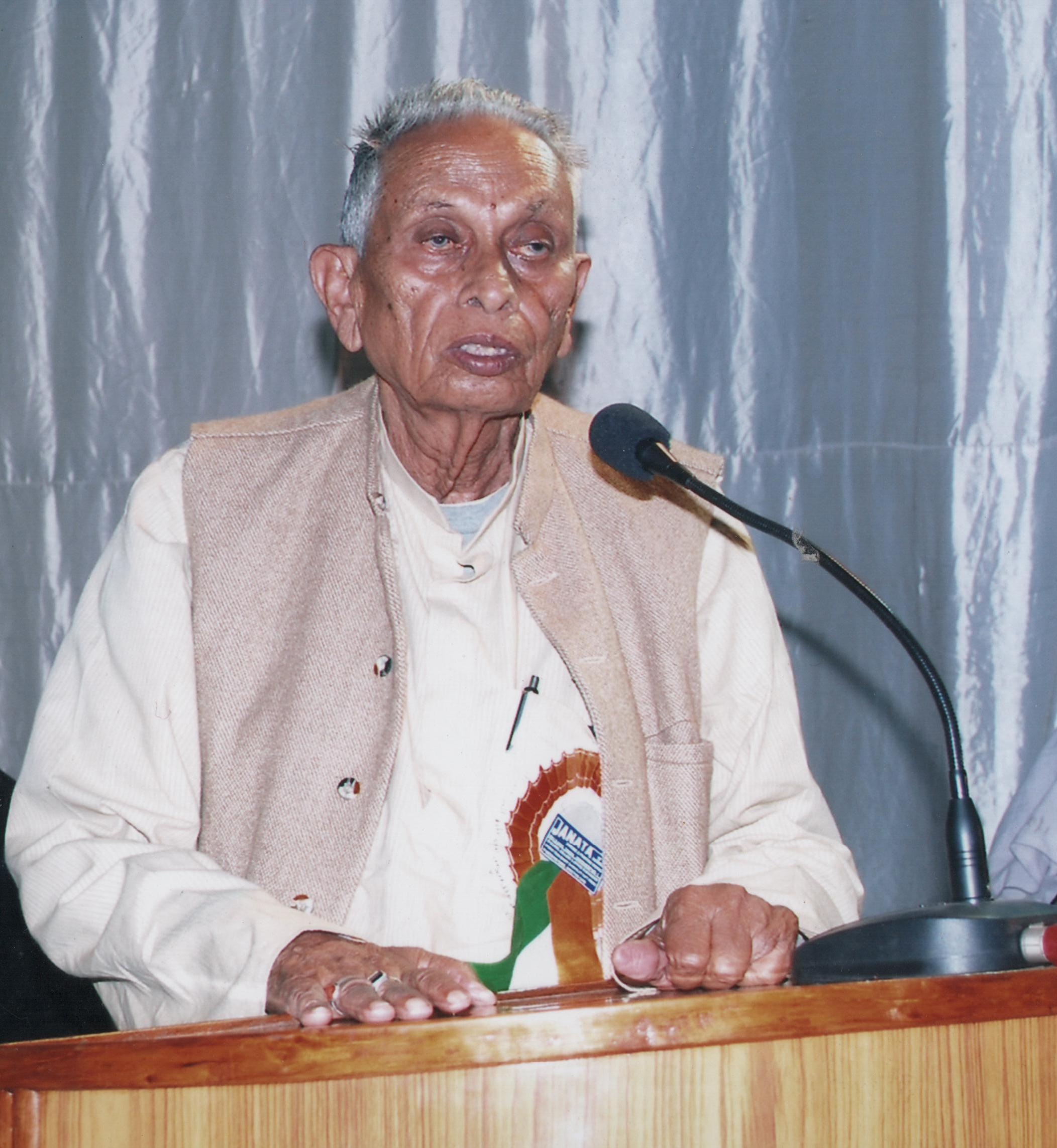
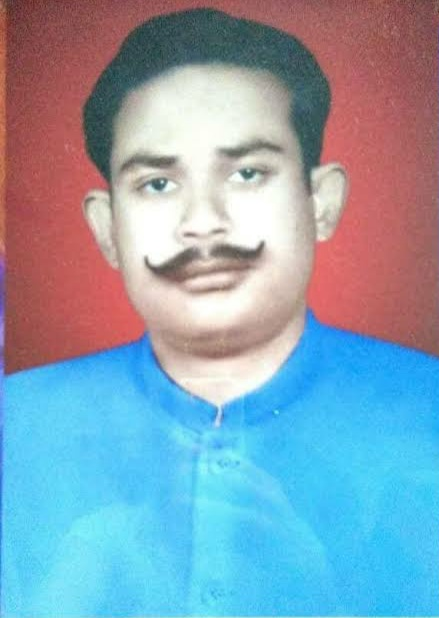
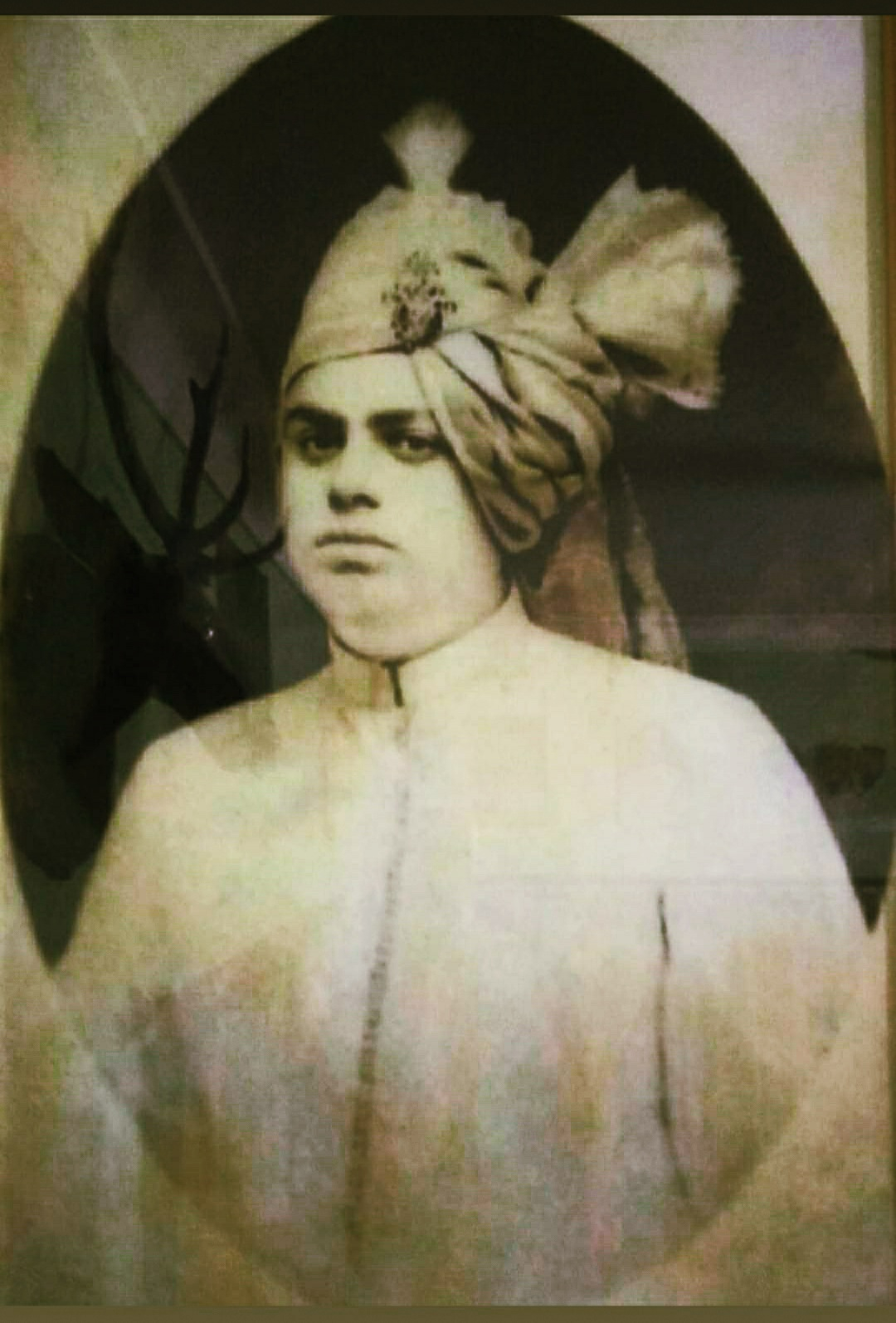
Left to right: Dhananjay Mahato, Yuvraj Prabhat Kumar Aditya Deo and Raja Shatrughan Aditya Deo

== Members of the Legislative Assembly ==
Election	Member	Party
Bihar Legislative Assembly
1957	Dhananjay Mahato	
1967	Dhananjay Mahato	
1967	Prabhat Kumar Aditya Deo	Indian National Congress
1969	Ghanshyam Mahato	All India Forward Bloc
1972	Shatrughan Aditya Deo	Independent politician
1977	Ghanshyam Mahato	Independent politician
1980	Ghanshyam Mahato	Independent politician
1985	Prabhat Kumar Aditya Deo	Indian National Congress
1990	Sudhir Mahato	Jharkhand Mukti Morcha
1995	Arvind Kumar Singh	Independent politician
2000	Arvind Kumar Singh	Bharatiya Janata Party
Jharkhand Legislative Assembly
2005	Sudhir Mahato	Jharkhand Mukti Morcha
2009	Arvind Kumar Singh	Jharkhand Vikas Morcha
2014	Sadhu Charan Mahato	Bharatiya Janata Party
2019	Sabita Mahato	Jharkhand Mukti Morcha
2024	Sabita Mahato	Jharkhand Mukti Morcha

== Election results ==
=== Assembly election 2024 ===
2024 Jharkhand Legislative Assembly election: Ichagarh
Party	Candidate	Votes	%	±%
JMM	Sabita Mahato	77,552	33.90%	▲4.65
AJSU	Hare Lal Mahato	51,029	22.31%	▲2.57
JLKM	Tarun Mahato	41,138	17.98%	New
Independent	Arvind Kumar Singh	20,219	8.84%	New
Independent	Sukhram Hembram	15,733	6.88%	New
Independent	Ashutosh Mahato	2,370	1.04%	New
Independent	Anup Kumar Mahato	2,350	1.03%	New
NOTA	None of the Above	1,360	0.59%	▲0.05
Margin of victory		26,523	11.59%	▲2.08
Turnout		2,28,753	79.05%	▲3.42
Registered electors		2,89,382		▲11.25
JMM hold		Swing	▲4.65	

=== Assembly election 2019 ===
2019 Jharkhand Legislative Assembly election: Ichagarh
Party	Candidate	Votes	%	±%
JMM	Sabita Mahato	57,546	29.25%	▲10.43
AJSU	Hare Lal Mahato	38,836	19.74%	New
BJP	Sadhu Charan Mahato	38,485	19.56%	▼23.09
Independent	Arvind Kumar Singh	32,206	16.37%	New
Independent	Narayan Chandra Gope	2,798	1.42%	New
Independent	Guru Pad Mahato	2,237	1.14%	New
LJP	Vijay Mahato	2,011	1.02%	New
NOTA	None of the Above	1,072	0.54%	New
Margin of victory		18,710	9.51%	▼14.31
Turnout		1,96,729	75.63%	▼4.06
Registered electors		2,60,120		▲16.89
JMM gain from BJP		Swing	▼13.40	

=== Assembly election 2014 ===
2014 Jharkhand Legislative Assembly election: Ichagarh
Party	Candidate	Votes	%	±%
BJP	Sadhu Charan Mahato	75,634	42.65%	▲30.13
JMM	Sabita Mahato	33,384	18.82%	▲3.72
JVM(P)	Arvind Kumar Singh	28,999	16.35%	▼15.74
INC	Hikim Chandra Mahato	12,510	7.05%	New
SP	Sitaram Sonar	4,351	2.45%	New
Jharkhand Party	Shailendra Kumar Maithy	3,232	1.82%	▼0.53
BSP	Ram Bilas Lohra	3,224	1.82%	New
Margin of victory		42,250	23.82%	▲11.37
Turnout		1,77,346	79.69%	▲4.39
Registered electors		2,22,532		▲18.29
BJP gain from JVM(P)		Swing	▲10.55	

=== Assembly election 2009 ===
2009 Jharkhand Legislative Assembly election: Ichagarh
Party	Candidate	Votes	%	±%
JVM(P)	Arvind Kumar Singh	45,465	32.09%	New
AJSU	Bishwa Ranjan Mahato	27,829	19.64%	▲12.73
JMM	Sudhir Mahato	21,396	15.10%	▼27.09
BJP	Sadhu Charan Mahato	17,730	12.52%	▼21.37
Independent	Guru Charan Kisku	7,952	5.61%	New
Jharkhand Party	Shailendra Kumar Maithy	3,329	2.35%	New
Independent	Krishna Singh Munda	1,898	1.34%	New
Margin of victory		17,636	12.45%	▲4.14
Turnout		1,41,662	75.30%	▲5.74
Registered electors		1,88,130		▼1.82
JVM(P) gain from JMM		Swing	▼10.10	

=== Assembly election 2005 ===
2005 Jharkhand Legislative Assembly election: Ichagarh
Party	Candidate	Votes	%	±%
JMM	Sudhir Mahato	56,244	42.20%	▲18.99
BJP	Arvind Kumar Singh	45,166	33.89%	▼1.29
AJSU	Hikim Chandra Mahato	9,213	6.91%	New
RJD	Khagen Mahto	3,658	2.74%	New
Independent	Kusum Kamal Singh	3,091	2.32%	New
AIFB	Pradeep Mahato	2,834	2.13%	New
Independent	Samar Kumar	2,623	1.97%	New
Margin of victory		11,078	8.31%	▼3.66
Turnout		1,33,288	69.56%	▲6.59
Registered electors		1,91,611		▲13.15
JMM gain from BJP		Swing	▲7.02	

=== Assembly election 2000 ===
2000 Bihar Legislative Assembly election: Ichagarh
Party	Candidate	Votes	%	±%
BJP	Arvind Kumar Singh	37,505	35.17%	New
JMM	Sudhir Mahato	24,741	23.20%	New
Independent	Hikim Chandra Mahto	24,039	22.54%	New
INC	Upendra Kumar Singh	10,549	9.89%	New
CPI(M)	Bijoy Kumar Mahato	2,536	2.38%	New
Ajeya Bharat Party	Ashoka Oraon	2,464	2.31%	New
SP	Jagannath Mahto	1,400	1.31%	New
Margin of victory		12,764	11.97%	
Turnout		1,06,630	63.94%	
Registered electors		1,69,335		
BJP win (new seat)				

== See also ==
- Vidhan Sabha
- List of constituencies of Jharkhand Legislative Assembly
