= Sadhu Charan Mahato =

Indian politician (died 2021)

Sadhu Charan Mahato (1972/1973 – 23 November 2021) was an Indian politician and member of the Bharatiya Janata Party. Mahato was a member of the Jharkhand Legislative Assembly from the Ichagarh constituency in Seraikela Kharsawan district. He used the local Bengali language.
