= Arvind Kumar Singh (Jharkhand politician) =

Indian politician

- Constituency: Ichagrah

Personal details
- Children: Jay Singh, Yash Singh

Arvind Kumar Singh, also known as Malkhan Singh, is an Indian politician. He has been elected as a Member of Legislative Assembly three times from Ichagarh constituency in past. Arvind lives in Adityapur.

== Career ==
Singh started his political career with Indian National Congress. In 1995 election he wanted to contest from Ichagarh constituency but the party didn't give him the ticket. Arvind decided to contest as an independent candidate and won the election. In 2000 election, Bharatiya Janata Party gave him the ticket from the same constituency and he won the elections again. However, he lost the 2005 election when he contested as a BJP candidate again. He decided to leave BJP and join Jharkhand Vikas Morcha (JVM – P) and he contested 2009 election from Ichagarh and defeated the then deputy chief minister – Sudhir Mahto. In 2014, he again contested but lost the elections. In 2019, he left the party.
