= All Jharkhand Students Union =

Political party in India

- President: Sudesh Mahto
- Lok Sabha Leader: Chandra Prakash Choudhary
- Founder: Nirmal Mahato, Surya Singh Besra
- Founded: 22 June 1986 (39 years ago)
- Headquarters: Harmu Road Ranchi- 834001, Jharkhand
- Ideology: Regionalism
- ECI Status: State Party
- Alliance: NDA (2014–present)
- Seats in Rajya Sabha: 0 / 245
- Seats in Lok Sabha: 1 / 543
- Seats in Jharkhand Legislative Assembly: 1 / 81

Election symbol

Party flag
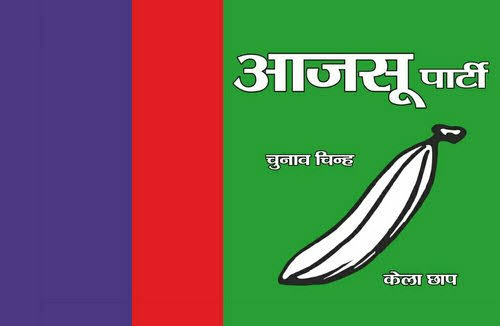

The All Jharkhand Students Union (AJSU), also referred to as the AJSU Party, is a state political party based in Jharkhand, India. The party was founded on 22 June 1986, modelled after the All Assam Students Union. The AJSU was the brain child of Nirmal Mahto. It was conceived from the struggles of the Jharkhand separate statehood movement and portrayed a more pragmatic and aggressive approach than its predecessors – the JMM and Jharkhand Party.

Founding members of the AJSU include Nirmal Mahato, Surya Singh Besra, Prabhakar Tirkey, Deosharan Bhagat, Kamal Kishore Bhagat, Praveen Prabhakar, among others.

== History ==
AJSU organized general strikes and campaigns to boycott the Lok Sabha elections in 1989. The formation of Jharkhand State is accredited to its organised and persistent demand for statehood. Today, AJSU contests elections under the leadership of Sudesh Mahto, a former deputy Chief Minister of the state.

In the 2004 Lok Sabha elections, AJSU was allied with the Bharatiya Janata Party. Ahead of the Jharkhand Legislative Assembly election, 2005, AJSU broke with the BJP-led NDA and formed an alliance with Lok Janshakti Party.

Ahead of the 2014 Jharkhand Legislative Assembly election, AJSU again allied with the BJP-led NDA. As results announced, AJSU won five seats while BJP won 37 seats in the state assembly securing the majority. AJSU party president Sudesh Mahto lost from his constituency Silli after representing it for nearly 15 years.

== Electoral history ==
=== Lok Sabha elections ===
Lok Sabha Term	Indian General Election	Seats contested	Seats won	Votes Polled	% of votes	Change in Seats	State (seats)
14th Lok Sabha	2004	5	0	1,57,930		Steady	Jharkhand
15th Lok Sabha	2009	6	0	2,00,523		Steady	Jharkhand
16th Lok Sabha	2014	9	0	4,81,667		Steady	Jharkhand
17th Lok Sabha	2019	1	1	648,277		▲1	Jharkhand
18th Lok Sabha	2024	1	1	447,896	2.62%	Steady	Jharkhand

=== Jharkhand Legislative Assembly elections ===
Assembly	Election	Seats contested	Seats won	Votes Polled	% of votes	Change in Seats
2nd	2005	40	2	284,921	2.8	▲ New
3rd	2009	54	5	526,231	5.12	▲3
4th	2014	8	5	510,277	5.7	Steady
5th	2019	53	2	1,219,535	8.10	▼3
6th	2024	10	1	632,186	3.54	▼1

=== West Bengal Legislative Assembly elections ===
Election	Seats contested	Seats won	Votes Polled	% of votes	Change in Seats
2011	1+4	0	18,220	0.04	New
2021	1	0	61,936	0.1	Steady

== List of presidents ==
Sl.	President	Portrait	Term		
1.	Prabhakar Tirkey		22 June 1986	1989	2 years, 194 days
2.	Sudesh Mahto		2007	Incumbent	19 years, 119 days

== List of deputy chief ministers ==
Sl.	Portrait	Deputy Chief Minister	Constituency	Term			Assembly	Chief Minister
1		Sudesh Mahto (born 1974)	Silli	30 December 2009	31 May 2010	152 days	3rd	Shibu Soren
1		Sudesh Mahto (born 1974)	Silli	11 September 2010	18 January 2013	2 years, 129 days	3rd	Arjun Munda

== List of MPs ==
=== Members of Parliament, Lok Sabha ===
Sl.	image.	MPs	Constituency	Term
1.		Chandra Prakash Choudhary	Giridih	2019–2024
1.		Chandra Prakash Choudhary	Giridih	2024–Incumbent

== See also ==
- List of political parties in India
