= Jharkhand Mukti Morcha =

Political party in India

Jharkhand Mukti Morcha Jharkhand Liberation Front
- Abbreviation: JMM
- President: Hemant Soren
- Secretary: Supriya Bhattacharya
- Rajya Sabha Leader: Sarfaraz Ahmad
- Lok Sabha Leader: Vijay Kumar Hansda
- Founder: Binod Bihari Mahato, Shibu Soren, A. K. Roy
- Founded: 2 February 1972; 54 years ago
- Headquarters: Bariatu Road, Ranchi, Jharkhand – 834008
- Student wing: Lokesh Kumar Das
- Youth wing: Basant Soren
- Women's wing: Kalpana Soren
- Ideology: Adivasi nationalism Regionalism
- Political position: Centre to centre-left
- Colours: Green
- ECI status: State Party
- Alliance: National Alliance INDIA (since 2023); Regional Alliances; MGB (Jharkhand) (since 2018); Former Alliances: UPA (2004–2009), (2013–2023) (till dissolved)) (National); National Democratic Alliance (2009–2013) (India); MGB (2025) (Bihar)
- Seats in Rajya Sabha: 2 / 245
- Seats in Lok Sabha: 3 / 543
- Seats in Jharkhand Legislative Assembly: 34 / 81
- Number of states and union territories in government: 1 / 31

Election symbol

Party flag

Website
- jmmparty.org

Jharkhand Mukti Morcha (JMM; lit. 'Jharkhand Liberation Front') is a political party in the Indian state of Jharkhand, founded by Binod Bihari Mahato, Shibu Soren, and A. K. Roy. Hemant Soren is the president of the JMM. JMM is also an influential political party in the state of Odisha and parts of neighbouring states. Its election symbol in Jharkhand is the Bow and Arrow.

The party was officially created on the birthday of Birsa Munda, the 19th-century tribal warrior of Jharkhand, who fought against the British rule in present-day Jharkhand. The State of Jharkhand also came into existence on Birsa Munda's birthday in 2000.

== Formation ==
For almost six decades the movement to separate Jharkhand from Bihar had been attempting to gain a foothold. The Jharkhand Party gained political strength but commissions examining the demands for a separate Jharkhand State consistently rejected its demands. Before 1962, the Jharkhand Party held between 23 and 32 seats in the Bihar Legislative Assembly. In 1962, it won 20 seats. Jaipal Singh Munda merged the Jharkhand Party with the Indian National Congress in 1963 and became a minister in Vinodanand Jha's government in Bihar. But other members did not join the Congress.

In the 1967 general election, the party had a very poor showing with only eight Assembly seats. The party soon split into several splinter parties each claiming to be the real Jharkhand Party. These included the Jharkhand Party led by N. E. Horo, the Jharkhand Party led by Naren, and the All India Jharkhand Party led by Bagun Sumroi. There was also the Hul Jharkhand Party led by Justin Richard, which further fragmented and became the Bihar Progressive Hul Jharkhand Party led by Shibu Soren.

Jharkhand Mukti Morcha was founded by Soren, Binod Bihari Mahato and Marxist Co-ordination Committee leader A. K. Roy. The party was officially created on the birthday of Birsa Munda, a 19th-century tribal warrior from Jharkhand, who fought against British rule in the region.

On 4 February 1973, Mahato became president of the party and Soren became its general secretary. Prominent party leaders at that time included Roy, Nirmal Mahto and Tek Lal Mahto, among others.

== Early years ==
In its early years, the JMM under Soren's leadership brought industrial and mining workers who were mainly non-tribals belonging to the Dalit and backward communities such as Surdis, Doms, Dusadh, Kurmi, Koiri, Gowala, and Teli into its fold. However Soren's association with the late politician Gyanranjan brought him close to the Prime Minister Indira Gandhi. He won the Dumka Lok Sabha seat in 1972. Irked by Soren's association with the Indian National Congress, a few younger members of the JMM banded together in Jamshedpur and set up the All Jharkhand Students Union (AJSU). This did not affect the growth of the JMM in the 1991 Indian general election, where the party won six seats.

Ram Dayal Munda reignited the movement for Jharkhand by unifying splinter groups among the tribals. Under his guidance the Jharkhand Coordination Committee was constituted in June 1987, comprising 48 organisations and group including the JMM factions. Due to Munda, Shibu Soren, Suraj Mandal, Simon Marandi, Shailendra Mahato, and AJSU leaders like Surya Singh Besra and Prabhakar Tirkey briefly shared a political platform, but the JMM pulled out of JCC as it felt that "the collective leadership was a farce". In 1988 and 1989, the JMM, AJSU and JPP successfully orchestrated so-called bandhs, economic blockades.

== Political wings ==
=== Jharkhand Yuva Morcha ===
Jharkhand Yuva Morcha (Jharkhand Youth Front) and Jharkhand Chhatra Morcha (Jharkhand Student Front), the youth and student wings of Jharkhand Mukti Morcha, were constituted at a conference in Ranchi 16 October 1991.

== Electoral history ==
=== General election results ===
Election Year	Lok Sabha	Seats contested	Seats won	± seats	Overall Votes	Percentage of votes	State (seats)
1984	8th Lok Sabha	10	0	Steady	332,403	0.14	Bihar
1989	9th Lok Sabha	12	3	▲3	1,032,276	0.34	Bihar
1991	10th Lok Sabha	14	6	▲3	1,481,900	0.54	Bihar
1996	11th Lok Sabha	29	1	▼5	1,287,072	0.38	Bihar
1998	12th Lok Sabha	16	0	▼1	1,324,548	0.36	Bihar
1999	13th Lok Sabha	23	0	Steady	974,609	0.27	Bihar
2004	14th Lok Sabha	9	5	▲5	1,846,843	0.47	Jharkhand
2009	15th Lok Sabha	42	2	▼3	1,665,173	0.40	Jharkhand
2014	16th Lok Sabha	21	2	Steady	1,637,994	0.30	Jharkhand
2019	17th Lok Sabha	13	1	▼1	1,901,976	0.31	Jharkhand
2024	18th Lok Sabha	6	3	▲2	2,652,955	0.41	Jharkhand

=== Jharkhand Legislative Assembly election results ===
Election Year	Seats contested	Seats won	± seats	Overall Votes	Percentage of votes
2005	49	17 / 81	▲5	1,447,774	14.29
2009	78	18 / 81	▲1	1,562,060	15.20
2014	79	19 / 81	▲1	2,832,921	20.43
2019	43	30 / 81	▲11	2,817,442	18.72
2024	43	34 / 81	▲4	4,183,281	23.44

=== Bihar Legislative Assembly election results ===
Election Year	Seats contested	Seats won	± seats	Overall Votes	Percentage of votes
1980	31	11 / 324	▲11	380,891	1.69
1985	57	9 / 324	▼2	443,822	1.82
1990	82	19 / 324	▲10	1,008,174	3.14
1995	63	10 / 324	▼9	803,132	2.32
2000	85	12 / 324	▲2	1,306,152	3.53
2005	18	0 / 243	▼12	76,671	0.31
2010	41	1 / 243	▲1	176,400	0.61
2015	—	0 / 243	▼1	103,940	0.31

=== Odisha Legislative Assembly election results ===
Election Year	Seats contested	Seats won	± seats	Overall Votes	Percentage of votes
1995	16	4 / 147	▲4	307,517	1.94
2000	—	3 / 147	▼1	301,729	2.14
2004	12	4 / 147	▲1	301,777	1.78
2024	5	0 / 147	▼	—	—

=== West Bengal Legislative Assembly election results ===
Election Year	Seats contested	Seats won	± seats	Overall Votes	Percentage of votes
1982	1	0 / 294	Steady	1,268	0.01
1991	23	0 / 294	Steady	95,038	0.31
1996	26	0 / 294	Steady	134,436	0.37
2006	7	0 / 294	Steady	—	—
2011	30	0 / 294	Steady	226,047	0.47

=== Assam Legislative Assembly election results ===
Election Year	Seats contested	Seats won	± seats	Overall Votes	Percentage of votes
2026	16	0 / 126	Steady	251,350	1.16

== List of presidents ==
No.	Portrait	Presidents	Term in Office					
No.	Portrait	Presidents	1.		Shibu Soren	9 August 1987	15 April 2025	37 years, 250 days
2.		Hemant Soren	15 April 2025	Incumbent	1 year, 192 days			

== List of chief ministers ==
No.	Portrait	Chief Minister	Term in Office			Assembly (election)	Constituency
No.	Portrait	Chief Minister	Start	End	Tenure	Assembly (election)	Constituency
1		Shibu Soren (born 1944)	2 March 2005	12 March 2005	308 days	2nd Assembly (2005 election)	did not contest
1		Shibu Soren (born 1944)	27 August 2008	19 January 2009	308 days	2nd Assembly (2005 election)	did not contest
1		Shibu Soren (born 1944)	30 December 2009	1 June 2010	308 days	3rd Assembly (2009 election)	did not contest
3		Champai Soren (born 1956)	2 February 2024	3 July 2024	153 days	5th Assembly (2019 election)	Seraikella
2		Hemant Soren (born 1975)	13 July 2013	28 December 2014	6 years	3rd Assembly (2009 election)	Dumka
2		Hemant Soren (born 1975)	29 December 2019	2 February 2024	6 years	5th Assembly (2019 election)	Barhait
2		Hemant Soren (born 1975)	4 July 2024	28 November 2024	6 years	5th Assembly (2019 election)	Barhait
2		Hemant Soren (born 1975)	28 November 2024	Incumbent	6 years	6th Assembly (2024 election)	Barhait

== List of union ministers ==
No.	Portrait	Minister	Portfolio	Term in Office			Constituency (House)	Prime Minister
No.	Portrait	Minister	Portfolio	Assumed Office	Left Office	Time in Office	Constituency (House)	Prime Minister
1		Shibu Soren (1944-2025)	Minister of Coal	23 May 2004	24 July 2004	62 days	Dumka (Lok Sabha)	Manmohan Singh
1		Shibu Soren (1944-2025)	Minister of Coal	27 November 2004	2 March 2005	95 days	Dumka (Lok Sabha)	Manmohan Singh
1		Shibu Soren (1944-2025)	Minister of Coal	29 January 2006	29 November 2006	304 days	Dumka (Lok Sabha)	Manmohan Singh
1		Shibu Soren (1944-2025)	Minister of Mines and Minerals	23 May 2004	24 July 2004	62 days	Dumka (Lok Sabha)	Manmohan Singh

== List of deputy chief ministers ==
No.	Portrait	Deputy CM (Constituency)	Term in Office			Assembly (election)	Chief Minister
No.	Portrait	Deputy CM (Constituency)	Start	End	Tenure	Assembly (election)	Chief Minister
1		Sudhir Mahato (Ichagarh)	14 September 2006	23 August 2008	1 year, 344 days	2nd Assembly (2005 election)	Madhu Koda
2		Hemant Soren (Dumka)	11 September 2010	18 January 2013	2 years, 129 days	3rd Assembly (2009 election)	Arjun Munda

== List of leaders of opposition ==
No.	Leader of Opposition (Constituency)	Portrait	Term in Office			Assembly (election)
No.	Leader of Opposition (Constituency)	Portrait	Start	End	Tenure	Assembly (election)
1	Stephen Marandi (Dumka)		24 November 2000	10 July 2004	3 years, 229 days	1st Assembly (2000 election)
2	Haji Hussain Ansari (Madhupur)		2 August 2004	1 March 2005	211 days	1st Assembly (2000 election)
3	Sudhir Mahato (Silli)		16 March 2005	18 September 2006	1 year, 186 days	2nd Assembly (2005 election)
4	Hemant Soren (Barhait)		7 January 2015	28 December 2019	4 years, 355 days	4th Assembly (2014 election)

== List of MPs ==
=== Members of Parliament, Rajya Sabha ===
S.No	Members of Parliament	Term	
S.No	Members of Parliament	Term Start	Term End
1.	Shibu Soren	08 July 1998	18 July 2001
1.	Shibu Soren	10 April 2002	02 June 2002
1.	Shibu Soren	22 June 2020	4 August 2025
2.	Stephen Marandi	08 July 2004	16 March 2005
3.	Hemant Soren	24 June 2009	04 January 2010
4.	K. D. Singh	08 July 2010	12 February 2014
5.	Sanjiv Kumar	04 May 2012	03 May 2018
6.	Mahua Maji	08 July 2022	07 July 2028
7.	Sarfaraz Ahmad	04 May 2024	03 May 2030
8.	Baidyanath Ram	22 June 2026	21 June 2032

=== Members of Parliament, Lok Sabha ===
S.No	MPs	Constituency	Term
1.	Simon Marandi	Rajmahal	1989–1991
1.	Simon Marandi	Rajmahal	1991–1996
2.	Shibu Soren	Dumka	1989–1991
2.	Shibu Soren	Dumka	1991–1996
2.	Shibu Soren	Dumka	1996–1998
2.	Shibu Soren	Dumka	2004–2009
2.	Shibu Soren	Dumka	2009–2014
2.	Shibu Soren	Dumka	2014–2019
3.	Shailendra Mahato	Jamshedpur	1989–1991
4.	Suraj Mandal	Godda	1991–1996
5.	Binod Bihari Mahato	Giridih	1991–1996
6.	Krishna Marandi	Singhbhum	1991–1996
7.	Hemlal Murmu	Rajmahal	2004–2009
8.	Tek Lal Mahto	Giridih	2004–2009
9.	Sunil Kumar Mahato	Jamshedpur	2004–2007
10.	Suman Mahato	Jamshedpur	2007–2009
11.	Kameshwar Baitha	Palamu	2009–2014
12.	Vijay Kumar Hansdak	Rajmahal	2014–2019
12.	Vijay Kumar Hansdak	Rajmahal	2019–2024
12.	Vijay Kumar Hansdak	Rajmahal	2024–Incumbent
13.	Nalin Soren	Dumka	2024–Incumbent
14.	Joba Majhi	Singhbhum	2024–Incumbent

== See also ==
- List of political parties in India
