= 2005 Jharkhand Legislative Assembly election =

Elections held in 2005

- 3 – 23 February 2005

81 seats in the Jharkhand Legislative Assembly 41 seats needed for a majority
- Turnout: 57.00%
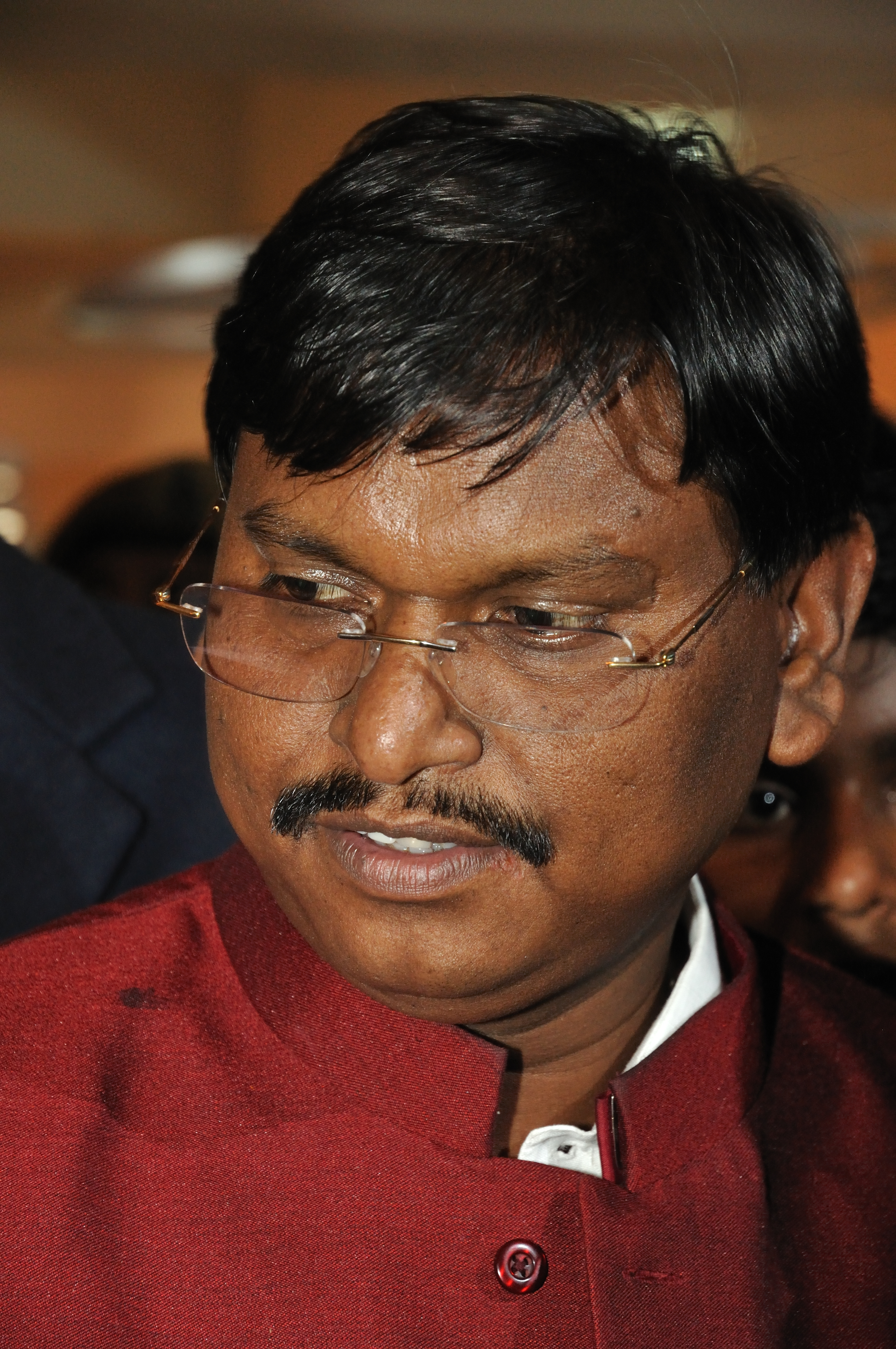

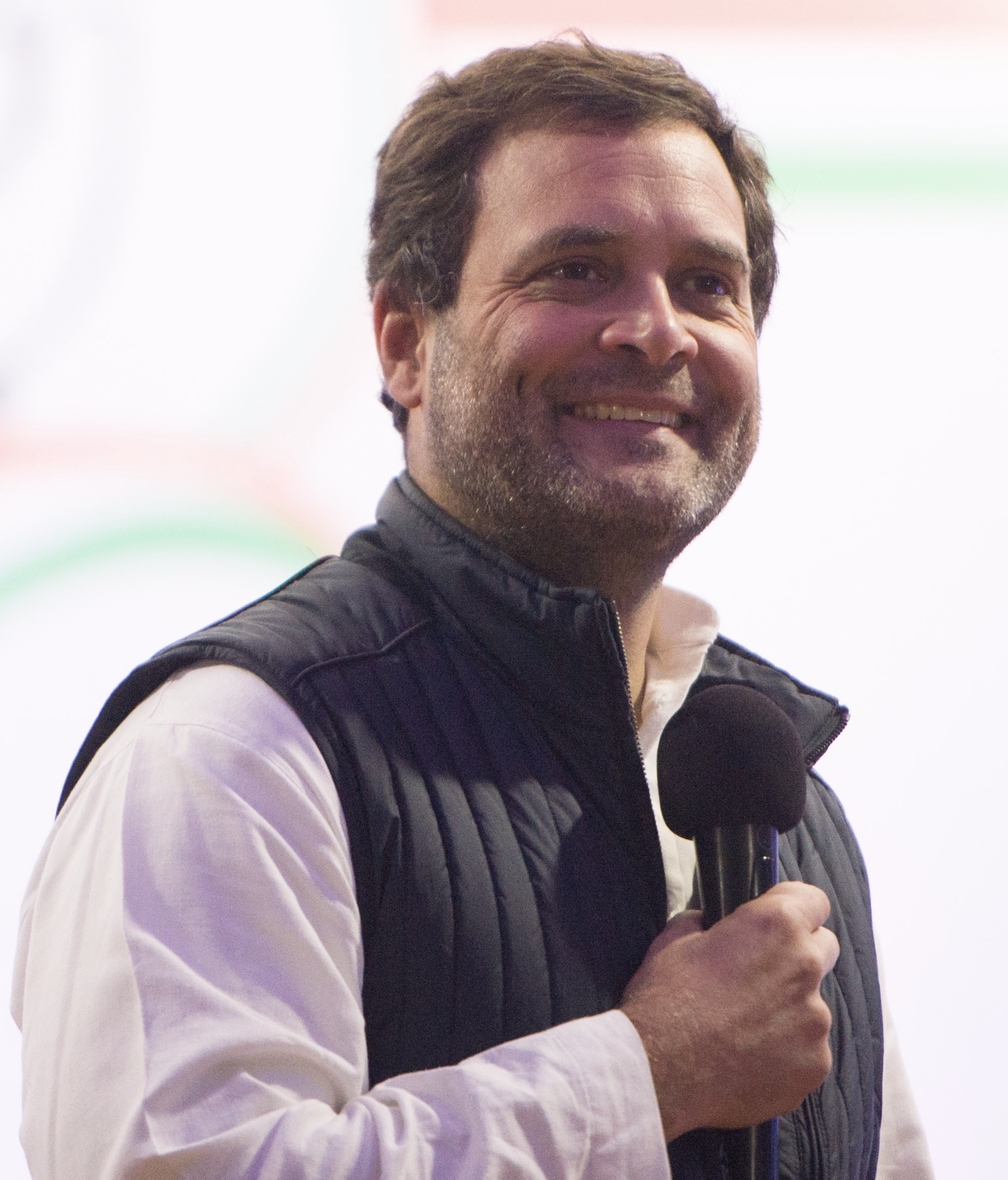

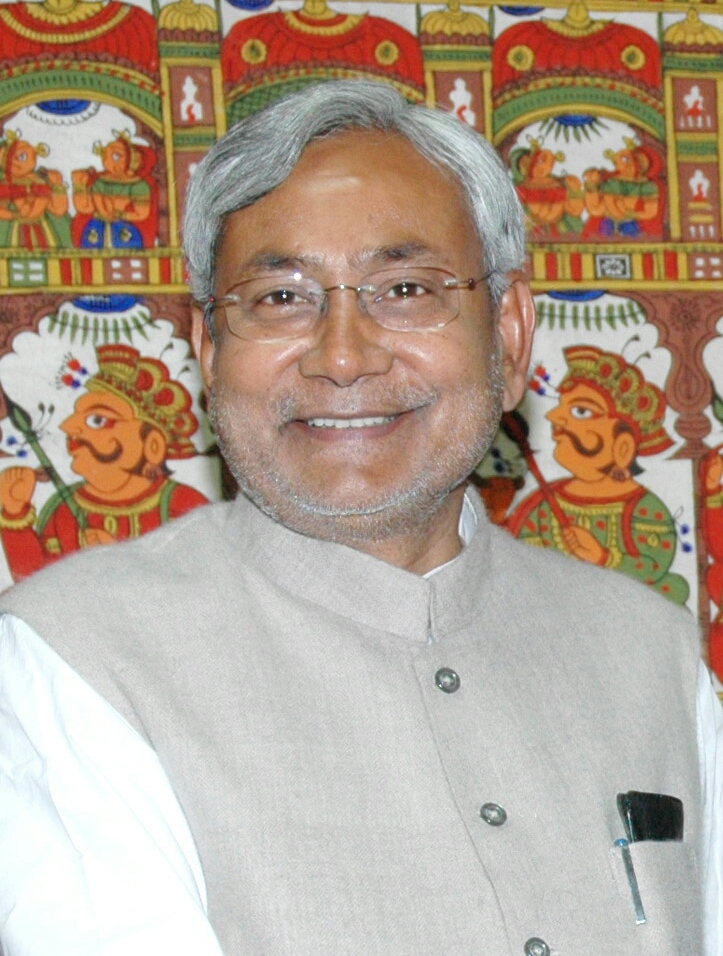

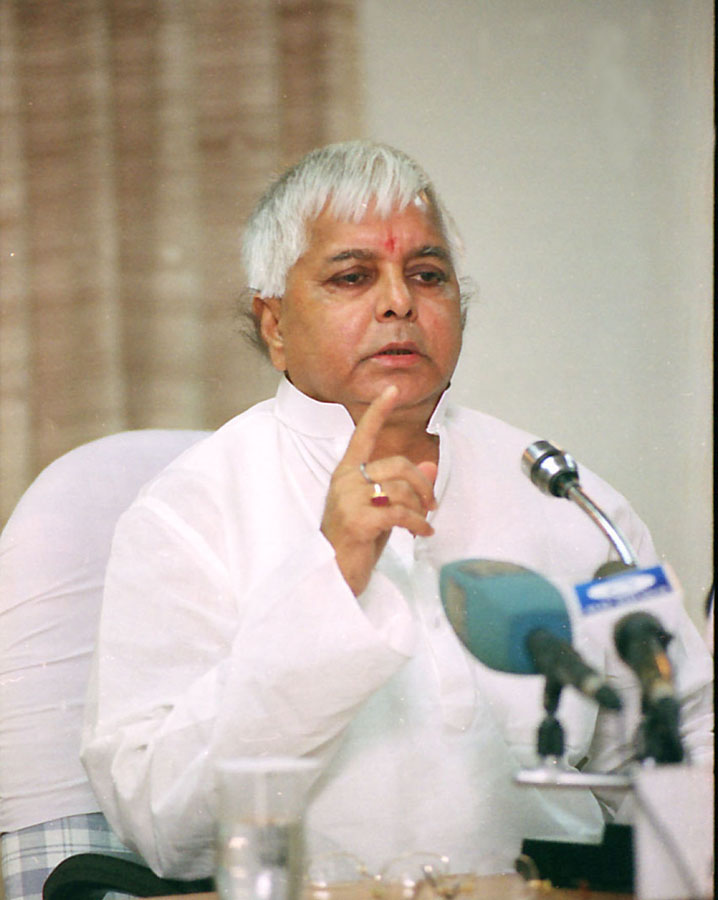
	Majority party	Minority party
Leader	Arjun Munda	Rahul Gandhi
Party	BJP	INC
Alliance	NDA	UPA
Leader's seat	Kharsawan	Did not contest (Note: Gandhi was the sitting MP for Amethi)
Last election	32	12
Seats won	30	17
Seat change	▲2	▼5
Popular vote	2,387,130	1,447,774
Percentage	24.57%	14.29%
	Third party	Fourth party
Leader	Nitish Kumar	Lalu Singh Yadav
Party	JD(U)	RJD
Alliance	NDA	UPA
Leader's seat	Did not contest (Note: Scindia was the sitting MP of Guna)	Did not contest
Last election	11	9
Seats won	9	7
Seat change	▼2	▼2
Popular vote	1,220,498	859,169
Percentage	12.05%	8.48%
Chief Minister before election
Arjun Munda
BJP
Chief Minister
Arjun Munda
BJP

The 2005 Jharkhand Legislative Assembly election was held in three phases from 3 to 23 February 2005 to elect the 81 members of the Jharkhand Legislative Assembly. The results were counted on 27 February 2005. It was the first election held in Jharkhand to elect the Second Jharkhand Legislative Assembly; the First/Interim Jharkhand Legislative Assembly was constituted based on the 2000 Jharkhand Legislative Assembly election. Jharkhand was created by carving out the southern districts of Bihar on 15 November 2000. The election resulted in a hung assembly like the first one. No single party or pre-election alliance got the majority. The Bharatiya Janata Party become the biggest party by winning 30 seats. The Jharkhand Mukti Morcha got 17 seats and the Indian National Congress got nine seats.

== Background and Government Formation ==
After the formation of Jharkhand on 15 November 2000, the first Legislative Assembly of Jharkhand was constituted by the MLAs elected in the 2000 Bihar Legislative Assembly election, whose constituencies were in the newly formed Jharkhand. The 2005 election was the first one being conducted in Jharkhand.

Shibu Soren of Congress-JMM alliance was invited to form the government, sparking controversy, but resigned nine days later, on 11 March, following his failure to obtain a vote of confidence in the assembly.

Then Arjun Munda of BJP-led NDA became the CM. In September 2006, Madhu Koda and three other independent legislators withdrew support to the Munda government, bringing it into the minority and led to resignation of Munda.

The United Progressive Alliance, with support of Goans Party, Forward bloc and 3 independents, decided on Madhu Koda as consensus candidate who was sworn in on 14 September 2006, becoming third independent CM in the country.

On 17 August 2008, JMM withdrew support from the Koda government. Shibu Soren again became the CM, but had to resign on 12 January 2009, after he failed to enter the Jharkhand assembly, suffering a humiliating defeat in the assembly bypoll.

== Interim Jharkhand Legislative Assembly (2000-2005) ==
Party	Symbol	Seats
Bharatiya Janata Party		32
Jharkhand Mukti Morcha		12
Indian National Congress		11
Rashtriya Janata Dal		9
Samata Party		5
Janata Dal (United)		3
Communist Party of India		3
United Goans Democratic Party		2
Communist Party of India (M-L) L		1
Marxist Co-ordination Committee		1
Independent		2
Total		81

- The First assembly of Jharkhand was constituted on the basis of the Bihar state legislative assembly elections held in February, 2000.

== Parties and Alliances ==
Party/Alliance		Flag	Symbol	Leader	Seats
NDA	Bharatiya Janata Party			Arjun Munda	63
NDA	Janata Dal (United)			Inder Singh Namdhari	18
UPA	Jharkhand Mukti Morcha			Shibu Soren	43 + 6 (Note: Friendly contest on 6 constituencies between JMM and INC.)
UPA	Indian National Congress			Pradeep Kumar Balmuchu	38 + 3 (Note: Friendly contest on 3 constituencies between INC and JMM.)
Rashtriya Janata Dal				Lalu Prasad Yadav	51
Communist Party of India				A. B. Bardhan	15
Communist Party of India (Marxist)				Prakash Karat	13
All Jharkhand Students Union				Sudesh Mahato	40
Lok Jan Shakti Party				Ram Vilas Paswan	38
Communist Party of India (Marxist–Leninist) Liberation				Vinod Kumar Singh	28
Jharkhand Party				Enos Ekka	27
United Goans Democratic Party				Joba Majhi	22
Nationalist Congress Party				Kamlesh Kumar Singh	13
All India Forward Bloc				Aparna Sengupta	12

== Results ==
=== Party-wise ===
Alliance	Party	Popular vote	Seats	
Alliance	Party	Popular vote	Contested	Won
NDA	Bharatiya Janata Party	23.57%	63	30
NDA	Janata Dal (United)	4.00%	18	6
NDA	Total	27.57%	81	36
UPA	Jharkhand Mukti Morcha	14.29%	49	17
UPA	Indian National Congress	12.05%	41	9
UPA	Total	26.34%	81	26
None	Rashtriya Janata Dal	8.48%	51	7
None	All Jharkhand Students Union	2.81%	40	2
None	United Goans Democratic Party	1.52%	22	2
None	All India Forward Bloc	1.00%	12	2
None	Communist Party of India (Marxist–Leninist)	2.46%	28	1
None	Jharkhand Party	0.97%	27	1
None	Nationalist Congress Party	0.43%	13	1
None	Independents	15.31%	662	3
Total		100%		81

=== District wise results ===
District	Seats							
District	Seats	BJP	JMM	INC	RJD	JDU	IND	OTH
Sahebganj	3	1	1	1	—N/a	—N/a	—N/a	—N/a
Pakur	3	—N/a	2	1	—N/a	—N/a	—N/a	—N/a
Dumka	6	2	2	—N/a	—N/a	—N/a	2	—N/a
Deoghar	3	1	—N/a	—N/a	1	1	—N/a	—N/a
Godda	3	3	—N/a	—N/a	—N/a	—N/a	—N/a	—N/a
Koderma	1	—N/a	—N/a	—N/a	1	—N/a	—N/a	—N/a
Hazaribagh	4	1	—N/a	2	—N/a	1	—N/a	—N/a
Ramgarh	2	1	—N/a	—N/a	—N/a	—N/a	—N/a	1
Chatra	2	2	—N/a	—N/a	—N/a	—N/a	—N/a	—N/a
Giridih	6	2	3	—N/a	—N/a	—N/a	—N/a	1
Bokaro	4	2	1	1	—N/a	—N/a	—N/a	—N/a
Dhanbad	6	3	1	—N/a	—N/a	1	—N/a	1
East Singhbhum	6	3	2	1	—N/a	—N/a	—N/a	—N/a
Seraikela Kharsawan	3	1	2	—N/a	—N/a	—N/a	—N/a	—N/a
West Singhbhum	5	1	2	—N/a	—N/a	—N/a	1	1
Ranchi	9	5	—N/a	1	—N/a	1	—N/a	2
Gumla	3	2	1	—N/a	—N/a	—N/a	—N/a	—N/a
Simdega	2	—N/a	—N/a	1	—N/a	—N/a	—N/a	1
Lohardaga	1	—N/a	—N/a	1	—N/a	—N/a	—N/a	—N/a
Latehar	2	—N/a	—N/a	—N/a	2	—N/a	—N/a	—N/a
Palamu	5	—N/a	—N/a	—N/a	2	2	—N/a	1
Garhwa	2	—N/a	—N/a	—N/a	1	—N/a	—N/a	1
Total	81	30	17	9	7	6	3	9

=== Constituency-wise ===
District	Constituency		Winner				Runner Up				Margin	%
District	#	Name	Candidate	Party	Votes	%	Candidate	Party	Votes	%	Margin	%
Sahebganj	1	Rajmahal	Thomas Hansda	INC	36,472	25.72	Arun Mandal	IND	25,296	17.84	11,176	7.88
Sahebganj	2	Borio (ST)	Tala Marandi	BJP	44,546	39.74	Lobin Hembrom	JMM	38,227	34.10	6,319	5.64
Sahebganj	3	Barhait (ST)	Thomas Soren	JMM	42,332	45.92	Simon Malto	BJP	28,593	31.02	13,739	14.90
Pakur	4	Litipara (ST)	Sushila Hansdak	JMM	29,661	32.28	Simon Marandi	BJP	22,464	24.45	7,197	7.83
Pakur	5	Pakaur	Alamgir Alam	INC	71,736	48.10	Beni Prasad Gupta	BJP	46,000	30.84	25,736	17.26
Pakur	6	Maheshpur (ST)	Suphal Marandi	JMM	45,520	41.98	Devidhan Besra	BJP	32,704	30.16	12,816	11.82
Dumka	7	Sikaripara (ST)	Nalin Soren	JMM	27,723	29.66	Raja Marandi	JD(U)	24,641	26.36	3,082	3.30
Dumka	8	Nala	Rabindra Nath Mahato	JMM	30,847	30.00	Satyanand Jha	BJP	29,725	28.91	1,122	1.09
Dumka	9	Jamtara	Bishnu Prasad Bhaiya	BJP	49,387	39.02	Irfan Ansari	INC	45,895	36.26	3,492	2.76
Dumka	10	Dumka (ST)	Stephen Marandi	IND	41,340	38.65	Mohril Murmu	BJP	35,993	33.65	5,347	5.00
Dumka	11	Jama (ST)	Sunil Soren	BJP	44,073	46.24	Durga Soren	JMM	37,443	39.29	6,630	6.95
Dumka	12	Jarmundi	Hari Narayan Ray	IND	28,480	25.84	Devendra Kunwar	BJP	22,171	20.12	6,309	5.72
Deoghar	13	Madhupur	Raj Paliwar	BJP	48,756	32.59	Hussain Ansari	JMM	42,089	28.13	6,667	4.46
Deoghar	14	Sarath	Uday Shankar Singh	RJD	66,335	49.52	Shashank Sekhar Bhokta	JMM	51,429	38.39	14,906	11.13
Deoghar	15	Deoghar (SC)	Kameshwar Nath Das	JD(U)	43,065	29.55	Suresh Paswan	RJD	33,442	22.95	9,623	6.60
Godda	16	Poreyahat	Pradeep Yadav	BJP	72,342	52.56	Prashant Kumar	JMM	48,050	34.91	24,292	17.65
Godda	17	Godda	Manohar Kumar Tekariwal	BJP	43,728	31.96	Sanjay Prasad Yadav	RJD	30,639	22.39	13,089	9.57
Godda	18	Mahagama	Ashok Kumar	BJP	46,253	33.49	Ataur Rahman Siddique	RJD	39,825	28.84	6,428	4.65
Koderma	19	Kodarma	Annapurna Devi	RJD	46,452	31.12	Sajid Hussain	IND	19,998	13.40	26,454	17.72
Hazaribagh	20	Barkatha	Chitranjan Yadav	BJP	37,052	24.25	Digambar Kumar Mehata	IND	30,129	19.72	6,923	4.53
Hazaribagh	21	Barhi	Manoj Kumar Yadav	INC	58,313	46.06	Umashankar Akela	SP	49,990	39.48	8,323	6.58
Ramgarh	22	Barkagaon	Lok Nath Mahto	BJP	47,283	29.17	Yogendra Saw	INC	30,902	19.07	16,381	10.10
Ramgarh	23	Ramgarh	Chandra Prakash	AJSU	51,249	33.89	Nadra Bagum	CPI	28,970	19.16	22,279	14.73
Hazaribagh	24	Mandu	Khiru Mahto	JD(U)	33,350	20.80	Ram Prakash Bhai Patel	JMM	23,522	14.67	9,828	6.13
Hazaribagh	25	Hazaribagh	Saurabh Narain	INC	39,431	26.13	Braj Kishor Jaiswal	IND	36,366	24.09	3,065	2.04
Chatra	26	Simaria (SC)	Upendra Nath Das	BJP	31,858	30.19	Ram Chandra Ram	CPI	24,438	23.16	7,420	7.03
Chatra	27	Chatra (SC)	Satyanand Bhokta	BJP	50,332	39.42	Janardan Paswan	RJD	45,650	35.75	4,682	3.67
Giridih	28	Dhanwar	Ravindra Kumar Rai	BJP	42,357	29.71	Raj Kumar Yadav	CPI(ML)	39,023	27.37	3,334	2.34
Giridih	29	Bagodar	Binod Kr. Singh	CPI(ML)	68,752	47.98	Nagendra Mahto	JMM	44,272	30.90	24,480	17.08
Giridih	30	Jamua (SC)	Kedar Hazra	BJP	49,336	36.35	Chandrika Mahtha	JMM	44,202	32.56	5,134	3.79
Giridih	31	Gandey	Salkhan Soren	JMM	36,849	28.46	Sarfaraz Ahmed	RJD	35,337	27.29	1,512	1.17
Giridih	32	Giridih	Munna Lal	JMM	31,895	30.08	Chandramohan Prasad	BJP	24,920	23.50	6,975	6.58
Giridih	33	Dumri	Jagarnath Mahto	JMM	41,784	41.45	Lalchand Mahto	RJD	23,774	23.58	18,010	17.87
Bokaro	34	Gomia	Chhattu Ram Mahto	BJP	34,669	28.58	Madhaw Lal Singh	IND	31,227	25.74	3,442	2.84
Bokaro	35	Bermo	Yogeshwar Mahto	BJP	47,569	34.57	Rajendra Prasad Singh	INC	38,108	27.69	9,461	6.88
Bokaro	36	Bokaro	Md. Izrail Ansari	INC	44,939	20.19	Ashok Chaudhary	JD(U)	39,898	17.92	5,041	2.27
Bokaro	37	Chandankiyari (SC)	Haru Rajwar	JMM	17,823	16.34	Uma Kant Rajak	AJSU	13,706	12.57	4,117	3.77
Dhanbad	38	Sindri	Raj Kishore Mahato	BJP	41,361	27.56	Anand Mahato	MCC	34,358	22.89	7,003	4.67
Dhanbad	39	Nirsa	Aparna Sengupta	AIFB	50,533	31.72	Arup Chatterjee	MCC	48,196	30.25	2,337	1.47
Dhanbad	40	Dhanbad	Pashupati Nath Singh	BJP	83,692	44.50	Mannan Mallik	INC	62,012	32.97	21,680	11.53
Dhanbad	41	Jharia	Kunti Devi	BJP	62,900	43.41	Suresh Singh	INC	31,312	21.61	31,588	21.80
Dhanbad	42	Tundi	Mathura Prasad Mahato	JMM	52,112	37.84	Saba Ahmad	RJD	26,175	19.01	25,937	18.83
Dhanbad	43	Baghmara	Jaleshwar Mahato	JD(U)	54,206	36.88	Om Prakash Lal	INC	43,955	29.90	10,251	6.98
East Singhbhum	44	Baharagora	Dinesh Ku. Sarangi	BJP	51,753	38.03	Vidyut Varan Mahato	JMM	48,441	35.60	3,312	2.43
East Singhbhum	45	Ghatsila (ST)	Pradeep Balmuchu	INC	50,936	39.95	Ramdas Soren	IND	34,489	27.05	16,447	12.90
East Singhbhum	46	Potka (ST)	Amulya Sardar	JMM	53,760	40.57	Menka Sardar	BJP	40,001	30.19	13,759	10.38
East Singhbhum	47	Jugsalai (SC)	Dulal Bhuiyan	JMM	59,649	42.45	Haradhan Das	BJP	56,995	40.56	2,654	1.89
East Singhbhum	48	Jamshedpur East	Raghubar Das	BJP	65,116	52.96	Ramashray Prasad	INC	46,718	38.00	18,398	14.96
East Singhbhum	49	Jamshedpur West	Saryu Roy	BJP	47,428	32.29	Banna Gupta	SP	34,733	23.65	12,695	8.64
Seraikela Kharsawan	50	Ichagarh	Sudhir Mahto	JMM	56,244	42.20	Arvind Kumar Singh	BJP	45,166	33.89	11,078	8.31
Seraikela Kharsawan	51	Seraikella (ST)	Champai Soren	JMM	61,112	40.81	Lakxhman Tudu	BJP	60,230	40.22	882	0.59
West Singhbhum	52	Chaibasa (ST)	Putkar Hembrom	BJP	23,448	25.34	Deepak Birua	IND	18,383	19.86	5,065	5.48
West Singhbhum	53	Majhgaon (ST)	Niral Purty	JMM	38,827	44.74	Barkuwar Gagrai	BJP	33,626	38.75	5,201	5.99
West Singhbhum	54	Jaganathpur (ST)	Madhu Kodah	IND	26,882	36.74	Mangal Singh Sinku	INC	12,095	16.53	14,787	20.21
West Singhbhum	55	Manoharpur (ST)	Joba Majhi	UGDP	26,810	30.68	Guru Charan Nayak	BJP	25,213	28.85	1,597	1.83
West Singhbhum	56	Chakradharpur (ST)	Sukhram Oraon	JMM	41,807	50.07	Laxman Gilua	BJP	21,835	26.15	19,972	23.92
Seraikela Kharsawan	57	Kharsawan (ST)	Arjun Munda	BJP	74,797	68.43	Kunti Soy	INC	19,453	17.80	55,344	50.63
Ranchi	58	Tamar (ST)	Ramesh Singh Munda	JD(U)	22,195	25.53	Gopal Krishna Patar	IND	16,295	18.74	5,900	6.79
Ranchi	59	Torpa (ST)	Koche Munda	BJP	28,965	35.26	Niral Enem Horo	JKP	20,833	25.36	8,132	9.90
Ranchi	60	Khunti (ST)	Nilkanth Singh Munda	BJP	43,663	45.82	Roshan Kumar Surin	INC	27,963	29.35	15,700	16.47
Ranchi	61	Silli	Sudesh Mahto	AJSU	39,281	36.69	Amit Kumar	JMM	19,969	18.65	19,312	18.04
Ranchi	62	Khijri (ST)	Karia Munda	BJP	46,101	31.36	Sawna Lakra	INC	43,473	29.57	2,628	1.79
Ranchi	63	Ranchi	Chandreshwar Prasad Singh	BJP	74,239	51.58	Gopal Prasad Sahu	INC	48,119	33.43	26,120	18.15
Ranchi	64	Hatia	Gopal S. N. Shahdeo	INC	46,104	27.80	Krishna Kumar Poddar	BJP	40,897	24.66	5,207	3.14
Ranchi	65	Kanke (SC)	Ram Chander Baitha	BJP	61,502	40.73	Samari Lal	JMM	46,443	30.75	15,059	9.98
Ranchi	66	Mandar (ST)	Bandhu Tirkey	UGDP	56,597	40.36	Deo Kumar Dhan	INC	36,365	25.93	20,232	14.43
Gumla	67	Sisai (ST)	Sri Samir Oraon	BJP	34,217	33.39	Sri Shashi Kant Bhagat	INC	33,574	32.76	643	0.63
Gumla	68	Gumla (ST)	Bhushan Tirkey	JMM	36,266	38.68	Sudarshan Bhagat	BJP	35,397	37.75	869	0.93
Gumla	69	Bishunpur (ST)	Chandresh Oraon	BJP	24,099	24.83	Chamra Linda	IND	23,530	24.24	569	0.59
Simdega	70	Simdega (ST)	Neil Tirkey	INC	47,230	41.02	Nirmal Kumar Besra	BJP	38,119	33.10	9,111	7.92
Simdega	71	Kolebira (ST)	Enos Ekka	JKP	34,067	34.36	Theodore Kiro	INC	29,781	30.03	4,286	4.33
Lohardaga	72	Lohardaga (ST)	Sukhdeo Bhagat	INC	35,023	32.80	Sadhnu Bhagat	BJP	28,243	26.45	6,780	6.35
Latehar	73	Manika (ST)	Ramchandra Singh	RJD	26,460	31.38	Dr. Deepak Oraon	JMM	16,577	19.66	9,883	11.72
Latehar	74	Latehar (SC)	Prakash Ram	RJD	18,819	26.90	Ramdev Ganjhu	JMM	13,421	19.19	5,398	7.71
Palamu	75	Panki	Bidesh Singh	RJD	43,350	39.74	Vishwanath Singh	CPI(ML)	22,928	21.02	20,422	18.72
Palamu	76	Daltonganj	Indar Singh Namdhari	JD(U)	45,386	31.68	Anil Kumar Chaurasia	IND	41,625	29.05	3,761	2.63
Palamu	77	Bishrampur	Ramchandra Chandravansi	RJD	40,658	32.02	Ajay Kumar Dubey	INC	22,046	17.36	18,612	14.66
Palamu	78	Chhatarpur (SC)	Radha Kishore	JD(U)	39,667	39.17	Pushpa Devi	RJD	23,234	22.94	16,433	16.23
Palamu	79	Hussainabad	Kamlesh Kumar	NCP	21,661	19.75	Sanjay Kr. Singh Yadav	RJD	21,626	19.72	35	0.03
Garhwa	80	Garhwa	Giri Nath Singh	RJD	34,374	24.72	Sairaj Ahmed Ansari	JD(U)	25,841	18.58	8,533	6.14
Garhwa	81	Bhawanathpur	Bhanu Pratap Sahi	AIFB	38,090	24.68	Anant Pratap Deo	INC	33,040	21.40	5,050	3.28
