= Mahto =

Mahto or Mahato is a surname used by several castes and communities in Nepal and the states of Bihar, Jharkhand, West Bengal, Uttar Pradesh and Odisha in India.

Historically, Mahato was the hereditary title of the village headman, whose duties were to maintain peace in his area, and collect revenue for the zamindar (feudal landlord). In multi-caste villages of Bihar, the zamindar used to give the title of Mahato to one person each from the Bhumihar, Yadav, and Beldar caste. The traditional Oraon villages had a similar role for the Mahato, who served as the secular head of the village and jointly held the administrative authority with a priest (pahan).

In Bihar, the surname Mahto is also used by people belonging to Kushwaha caste. In Jharkhand, it is a term most often associated with Koeri and Kurmi caste.

The castes and communities that use Mahto, Mehto or Mahato as a surname, clan name or title include:

- Beldar
- Bhumihar
- Chamar
- Dhanuk
- Dhobi
- Dusadh
- Goala
- Khairwar
- Koeri
- Kudmi Mahato (Kurmi)
- Oraons
- Bedias
- Sunris
- Tharus
- Yadavs
- Brahmins

== Notable people ==
Notable people with the surname Mahto or Mahato include:

- Abha Mahato (born 1964), Indian politician from Jharkhand
- Aklu Ram Mahto (1940–2020), Indian politician from Jharkhand, served as Minister of Finance in undivided Bihar
- Amit Mahto, Indian politician from Jharkhand
- Anand Mahato, Indian politician from Jharkhand
- Ashwamedh Mahto (born 1967), Indian politician from Bihar
- Bablu Mahato, Indian politician from Jharkhand
- Bhabini Mahato (1925–2014), Bengali freedom fighter and activist
- Baidyanath Prasad Mahto (born 1947), Indian politician from Bihar
- Bandhu Mahto, Indian politician from Bihar
- Baneswar Mahato, Indian politician from West Bengal
- Banshilal Mahto (1940–2019), Indian politician from Chhattisgarh
- Bebi Mahto, Member of Jharkhand Legislative Assembly, minister in Government of Jharkhand
- Bhajahari Mahato (1911–2003), Indian politician from West Bengal
- Bidyut Baran Mahato (born 1963), Indian politician from Jharkhand
- Binod Bihari Mahato (1923–1991), Indian politician and advocate from Jharkhand
- Bir Singh Mahato (1945–2021), Indian politician from West Bengal
- Birendra Prasad Mahato, Nepalese politician
- Buli Mahato (Died 14 June 1834), A revolutionary leader of the anti-British Rebellion from Jharkhand
- Chhatradhar Mahato (born 1964), Indian political activist from West Bengal
- Chanku Mahato (1816–1856), Indian freedom fighter
- Chitta Mahato, Indian politician from West Bengal
- Dhananjay Mahato (1919–2014), Indian freedom fighter, social activist, and politician from Jharkhand
- Dulu Mahato, Indian politician from Jharkhand
- Indrajit Mahato, Indian politician from Jharkhand
- Jairam Kumar Mahato, Indian politician from Jharkhand
- Jagannath Mahto, Indian politician from Jharkhand
- Jagdish Mahto, communist activist and founder of Naxalism in Bihar
- Jaleshwar Mahato, Indian politician from Jharkhand
- Julie Kumari Mahato, Nepalese politician, former minister
- Jyotirmay Singh Mahato, Indian politician from West Bengal
- Keshav Mahto Kamlesh, Indian politician from Jharkhand
- Khiru Mahto (born 1953), Indian politician from Jharkhand
- Kishor Mahato (born 2000), Nepalese fast bowler cricketer
- Lambodar Mahto, Indian politician from Jharkhand
- Laxmi Mahato Koiri, Nepalese politician
- Lok Nath Mahato, Indian politician from Jharkhand
- Mriganko Mahato, (born 1963) Indian politician from West Bengal
- Muga Lal Mahato, Nepalese politician
- Nagendra Mahto, Indian politician from Jharkhand
- Narahari Mahato (born 1956), Indian politician from West Bengal
- Nepal Mahato, Indian politician from West Bengal
- Nirmal Mahto (1950–1987), Indian politician from Jharkhand
- Pradeep Mahto, Indian politician from Bihar
- Puja Mahato (born 2006), Nepalese all-rounder cricketer
- Purnima Mahato, Indian archer and archery coach from Jharkhand
- Rabindra Nath Mahato, India Politician from Jharkhand, Speaker of Jharkhand Vidhan Sabha
- Raghunath Mahato, Indian freedom fighter (Chuar Rebellion)
- Raj Banshi Mahto, Indian politician from Bihar
- Raj Kishore Mahato, Indian politician from Jharkhand
- Rajendra Mahato (born 1958), Former Deputy Prime Minister of Nepal
- Ramdeo Mahto, CPI(M) leader and six time MLA from Bihar
- Ramdev Mahato, former Member of Bihar Legislative Assembly
- Ram I. Mahato, Professor, scientist and chairman of the Dept. of Pharmaceutical Sciences, University of Nebraska Medical Center, USA
- Ram Lakhan Mahato (1947–2020), Indian politician from Bihar
- Ram Padarnath Mahto, former minister in Government of Bihar
- Ram Prakash Mahto, politician from Bihar
- Rambalak Mahto,(born 1924), Advocate General of the state of Bihar
- Rameshwar Mahto, Indian politician from Bihar
- Ramdeo Mahto, one of the founder leaders of Bhartiya Jana Sangh, the parent organisation of Bharatiya Janata Party in Bihar, former member of Bihar Legislative Assembly
- Sabita Mahato, Indian politician from Jharkhand
- Sagina Mahato, Indian social activist and leader of labour movement 1942–43 from West Bengal
- Sahdeo Mahato, (Born 1922), Indian politician and independence activist from Bihar
- Santiram Mahato, Indian politician from West Bengal
- Satrudhan Mahato, Nepalese politician
- Shatrughan Mahto, Indian politician from Jharkhand
- Shailendra Mahato, Indian politician from Jharkhand
- Shiva Mahto, three time Member of Bihar Legislative Assembly
- Sitaram Mahato, Nepalese politician
- Sudesh Mahto, Indian politician, former deputy chief minister of Jharkhand
- Sudhir Mahato, Indian politician, former deputy chief minister of Jharkhand
- Suman Mahato (born 1964), Indian politician from Jharkhand
- Sunil Kumar Mahato (1966–2007), Indian politician from Jharkhand
- Sushanta Mahato, member of West Bengal Legislative Assembly
- Tek Lal Mahto, Indian politician from Jharkhand
- Tooni Mahto, British marine biologist
- Yogeshwar Mahto, Indian politician from Jharkhand
