= Kudmi Mahato =

Tribal community in India, Nepal and Bangladesh

Regions with significant populations
- Jharkhand, Odisha, West Bengal, Assam, Nepal, and Bangladesh

Languages
- Native language – Kudmali/Kurmali; Secondary language – Hindi, Odia, Bengali

Religion
- Hinduism; Sarna Dharam

The Kudmi Mahato are a tribal community in the states of Jharkhand, West Bengal and Odisha of India. They are primarily agriculturalist.

== Classification ==
Kudmi were classified as a Notified Tribe by the British Raj under the terms of the Indian Succession Act introduced in 1865 as they have customary rules of succession. Kudmi of Chotanagpur are different from Kurmi of Gangetic plain. According to Mahanta (2003) kudmi follow totemism which stamps them as Dravidian descent and resembles to Dravidian tribe around them according to book The Tribes and Castes of Bengal (1891) written by Herbert Hope Risley. Subsequently, in 1913, they were classified as a Primitive tribe. Then they were omitted from the list of communities listed as tribes in the 1931 census.

They were not in the list of Scheduled Tribes drawn up in 1950. They are included in the list of Other Backward Classes in the States of Jharkhand, West Bengal and Odisha. In 2004, the Government of Jharkhand recommended that they should be listed as a Scheduled Tribe rather than Other Backward Class. The Tribal Research Institute of Government of India recommended against this proposal, claiming they are a sub-caste of the Kunbi and thus different to tribal people. Therefore, In 2015, the Government of India refused to approve the recommendation of Jharkhand government to list the Kudmi Mahato as Schedule Tribe.

The language of Kudmi is Kudmali/Kurmali. But according to study, Kurmali language have vocabulary which is neither Dravidian nor Austroasiatic. The Kudmi people once spoke a distinct language, neither Munda nor Dravidian but also not Indo-Aryan, and at some point switched to the regional Indo-Aryan lingua franca of that time, leaving a distinct substrate in their new language.

In April 2023, a Kudmi organization of West Bengal and Jharkhand engaged in rail blockages and demanded Scheduled Tribe status, a demand which was opposed by some scheduled tribes.

== Religion and culture ==
Social organisations of this tribal community have agitated for scheduled tribe status and recognition of their traditional Sarna religion. During the 20th century, some Kudmis of Chhotanagpur underwent a social change of Kshatriyaization along with the Kurmi of North India

Historically, the Kudmi Mahatos have been a noble class who were landowning zamindars. They exhibit upper-caste status and performed priestly functions in the temples situated in western Rarh region.

The traditional occupation of Kudmi is agriculture. Kudmi are divided into 81 clans or gushti including Keshria, Hindowar, Bagh Banwar, Nagwar, Punoriar, Bangsoar, Sankhwar, Kanbindha, Katiar, Dumriar, Karwar etc.

They are nature worshipers. Bari Puja, Karam, Chait Parab, Jitiya, Bandna, Tusu Parab are some of the major festivals of Kudmis. They worship Budha Baba in Madapthan and Garam at garamthan. Jhumair and Chhau are their folk dance.

== Genetics ==
According to National Institute of Biomedical Genomics(NIBMG), the Kudmi Mahatos genetically cluster together with other Indo-European speaking populations of Bengal & Orissa region indicating less genetic distance between both the populations. The study also identifies the Kudmi population as Indo-European speaking who have a geographic proximity with the Mundari speaking populations, also mentioned by Genome India Project (GIP).

Although clustered together with other Indo-European populations such as Rahri Brahmins, Kayastha, Mahishya and Oriya Brahmin, they show a considerable affinity with the Austroasiatic populations.

== Roles in Indian's freedom struggle ==
The Kudmi Mahato community played a role in various rebellions in India's freedom struggle. In the Quit India Movement, many Kudmi Mahatos were martyred. Kudmis also actively participated in the non-cooperation movement. Five Kudmi Mahato youths were martyred in this movement. These are Gokul Mahato, Mohan Mahato, Sahadeb Mahato, Ganesh Mahato. Many were also jailed. Girish Mahato, Nanku Chandra Mahato, Govinda Mahato, Dasharath Mahato, Chunaram Mahato, Mathan Mahato and others were imprisoned in Hazaribagh Jail during Mahatma Gandhi's civil disobedience movement. Padak Mahato was also imprisoned in Bhagalpur Jail. Sagar Mahato, Bhajahari Mahato, Bhim Mahato, Satyakinkar Mahato, Mohini Mahato were imprisoned for doing satyagraha in 1941. Then in 1942, Satyakinkar Mahato was imprisoned from Manbazar during the Quit India movement. Chunaram Mahato and Govinda Mahato were martyred during the siege of Manbazar police station in 1942. Among the women Bhavini Mahato played a prominent role. Jagadish Mahato of (Dhanbad-Parabasnia) also took an active part in the Quit India movement. Many others are also involved.

== Notable people ==
=== King ===
- Damodar Sekhar, 1st Raja of Panchkot Raj

=== Freedom Fighters ===
- Raghunath Mahato (1738 – 1778), freedom fighter
- Buli Mahato (? - 1834), freedom fighter
- Chanku Mahato (1816 – 1856), freedom fighter
- Bhajahari Mahato, (1911 - 2003), freedom fighter and later become member of parliament from Purilia
- Nirmal Mahato, (1950–1987), Jharkhand freedom fighter

=== Politicians ===
- Abha Mahato, member of parliament to the 12th Lok Sabha from Jamshedpur (Lok Sabha constituency), Jharkhand
- Amit Mahto, member of legislative assembly to the 4th Jharkhand Assembly from Silli (Vidhan Sabha constituency)
- Bidyut Baran Mahato, member of parliament to the 16th Lok Sabha from Jamshedpur (Lok Sabha constituency), Jharkhand
- Binod Bihari Mahato (1923–1991), Lawyer and politician
- Dhananjay Mahato (1919–2014), freedom fighter, social activist and politician
- Jagarnath Mahto (1967–2023) Former Education Minister of Jharkhand
- Anand Mahato, member of legislative assembly Sindri Assembly constituency Jharkhand
- Jairam Kumar Mahato, member of legislative assembly to the 6th Jharkhand Assembly from Dumri (Vidhan Sabha constituency)
- Jyotirmay Singh Mahato, member of parliament to the 17th Lok Sabha from Purulia (Lok Sabha constituency), West Bengal
- Mathura Prasad Mahto, member of the Jharkhand Legislative Assembly
- Mriganko Mahato, member of parliament to the 16th Lok Sabha from Purulia (Lok Sabha constituency), West Bengal
- Narahari Mahato, member of parliament to the 15th Lok Sabha from Purulia (Lok Sabha constituency), West Bengal
- Nirmal Mahato (1950–1987), political activist, Founder of AJSU
- Raj Kishore Mahato, former member of the Jharkhand Legislative Assembly
- Sabita Mahato, member of legislative assembly to the 5th Jharkhand Assembly from Ichagarh (Vidhan Sabha constituency)
- Shailendra Mahato, member of parliament to the 9th Lok Sabha from Jamshedpur (Lok Sabha constituency), Jharkhand
- Srikanta Mahata, member of legislative assembly to the 15th West Bengal Assembly from Salboni (Vidhan Sabha constituency)
- Shiva Mahto, Member of legislative assembly Bihar (Dumari)
- Sudesh Mahto, former Deputy Chief Minister of Jharkhand
- Sudhir Mahato (1961–2014) Former Deputy Chief Minister of Jharkhand, JMM
- Suman Mahato, member of parliament to the 14th Lok Sabha from Jamshedpur (Lok Sabha constituency), Jharkhand
- Sunil Kumar Mahato (1966–2007), member of parliament to the 14th Lok Sabha from Jamshedpur (Lok Sabha constituency), Jharkhand
- Bablu Mahato, member of legislative assembly 6th Jharkhand Assembly Sindri Assembly constituency Jharkhand
- Baby Devi member of legislative assembly Dumri Assembly constituency

=== Athletes ===
- Deepika Kumari, 4 times Olympian Archer
- Purnima Mahato, Achery coach Jamshedpur

== See also ==
- Sadan people
- Mahto
