= Shailendra Mahato =

Indian politician

Member of the Lok Sabha
- In office 1989–1991
- Succeeded by: Abha Mahato
- Constituency: Jamshedpur
- In office 1991–1996
- Preceded by: Abha Mahato
- Succeeded by: Abha Mahato

Chairman, Adityapur Industrial Development Area
- Incumbent
- Assumed office 1991

Chairman, RRDA Ranchi
- Incumbent
- Assumed office 2005

Personal details
- Born: 11 October 1953 Setahaka, Chakradharpur, West Singhbhum district, Jharkhand, India
- Party: Jharkhand Mukti Morcha (1978–1996); Bharatiya Janata Party (1996–present)
- Spouse: Abha Mahato
- Children: 2 sons
- Education: Matriculation (dropped out after 10th class)
- Occupation: Politician, writer

Shailendra Mahato is an Indian politician. He was the member of Jharkhand Mukti Morcha. He represented twice as a Member of Parliament from Jamshedpur Lok Sabha constituency.

== Early life ==
Mahato was born on 11 October 1953 in the Village Setahaka near Chakradharpur in erstwhile Bihar, now in Jharkhand. Belonging to the Kudmi farmer community, his father, Rabi Charan Mahato, was a Government employee (Gram Sewak), and his mother, Ludhi Rani, took care of the household. He dropped out of school after 10th class and left his home to commit his life to the exploration of spiritual pursuits. He explored multiple spiritual places but returned home after not being able to find a spiritual guru to guide him on his spiritual journey. Upon returning home he gave continuing his education a thought because of his interest in literature and writing, a habit that had stayed with him. He thought about his future for a while after returning home upon which he decided to join the Jharkhand Andolan.

== Early political career ==
1969

The first movement he joined was the Beedi Majdoor Andolan at Chakradharpur. After that, he joined the fight for the rights to the tendu leaf and mahua trees in the forests of Saranda, Porahat and Kolhan, which had been closed off to the local tribal populations that depended on them for their livelihood by the forest authorities. This was his first experience as a labour activist fighting for the forest rights of the local tribals of Jharkhand. The fruit-bearing trees like Mango, Mahua, Karanj, Kusum, Dori, etc, are a large part of the sustenance of the villagers.

1973

This was the first year that he joined the rising Jharkhand Andolan that put forward the demand for a separate state for Jharkhandis. The first mass rally he attended was in Jamshedpur 20 May 1973 after which in 1975 he accompanied N.E.Horo a sitting MP who called together a movement "Chalo Delhi for Jharkhand separate state" along with a large group of activists to Delhi, where a memorandum regarding the Jharkhand state was given to Indira Gandhi. It was at this protest that he was arrested with his fellow activists for the first time.

1978

As a young leader he oversaw the organisation of the Direct Action Movement ( 15 August 1978 - 15 September 1978) which was declared by the Jharkhand Party president and MP N.E. Horo stating that the people of the region would not pay taxes until the statehood of Jharkhand was declared by the central government, it was carried out across the Singbhum districts. This saw him committing to bigger roles within the Jharkhand movement as an emerging figure.

He joined the JMM (Jharkhand Mukti Morcha) on 25th Sep 1978 in a rally organised in his hometown Chakradharpur. With this, he entered a new phase of the Great Jharkhand movement across the regions of Kolhan and Ranchi where along with the demand for Jharkhand state, people also put forward the slogan of Jal(water) Jungle(forest) Jameen(land), which was a declaration of ownership of the natural resources of the land.

This was called the Great Jharkhand Movement owing to the unprecedented mobilisation of the masses, which caused worry among the leadership of Bihar, who decided to crack down on these gatherings with firings upon the common people and started hunting down the leaders. The villages of Ichahatu, Serengda, Gua, Baipi, and Sarjom Hatu, among others, experienced the worst of the atrocities by the Bihar police, resulting in the death of 18 Andolankaris by firing. This only led to more anger among the public and bolstered the movement against the Bihar government.

Mahato being a wanted leader of the movement was a big target for the authorities who were tracking him down. So much so that he had a shoot-at-sight order issued and also a reward price of 10000 on his head issued by the Bihar government. This led to firing on him during meeting held in Serengda, where two sisters Rahil Dang and Ajarmani almost got shot while protecting him and three men Somnath Longa, Dubiya Honhaga and Lupa Munda laid down their lives in the subsequent firing which also led to many injuries among the public. Constantly being on the run from the police finally brought him to Jamshedpur his future political base and constituency.

A report by the People's Union for Civil Liberties from the time read as follows: "Last year, on Mahatma Gandhi's birthday, the villagers of Serengda responded to the call by symbolically cutting down some saplings in a nearby teak nursery. They were also alleged to have burnt down some temporary jhuggis. The police in the area identified Shailendra Mahato a young man in his twenties, as the leader of the movement in the area. He is charged with a long list of crimes and is wanted by the police.

== Mainstream political career ==
- 1984 - Contested Lok Sabha election for the first time from Jamshedpur on a JMM ticket lost to Gopeshwar Das.
- 1986 - Became secretary of JMM.
- 1987 - General secretary of JMM.
- 1988 - Member of Committee on Jharkhand Matters formed by the Rajiv Gandhi government to bring a resolution to the Jharkhand Movement.
- 1989 - Contested and won the Jamshedpur Lok Sabha seat after defeating the Congress Party Candidate Chandan Bagchi.
- 1991 - Contested 3rd time and retained his 2nd term as the MP from Jamshedpur constituency defeating the BJP candidate Amar Pratap Singh.
- 1993 - This year was arguably the biggest and most controversial year of Mahato's political career that brought him to the stage of national politics. What began with a no-confidence motion passed against the Congress government culminated in a trial and a 3-year imprisonment verdict against then PM P.V Narsimha Rao and his aide Buta Singh that was later turned down. Mahato was one of the 4 MPs who were allegedly given bribes for votes in the Lok Sabha to ensure the survival of the Congress government. Mahato became the turning point in the whole case after he decided to turn approver and accept the fact that they had received money which he believed was a part of party funds and which he unwittingly put in a bank account.
- In the end all the MPs including Mahato were let off after the supreme court passed a judgement that read, “No member of Parliament shall be liable to any proceedings in court in respect of anything said or any vote given by him in Parliament or any committee thereof, and no person shall be so liable in respect of the publication by or under the authority of either house of parliament of any report, paper, votes or proceedings.” The purpose of this constitutional protection was to defend the independence and integrity the parliament. This case is considered a significant moment in the history of Indian Parliament and Indian Judiciary. The verdict still evokes strong reactions from all sections of society including the Judiciary and general public.
- 1996 - After getting national attention from the case Mahato decided to return his focus back to the matter of Jharkhand independence . The realisation that only a national party could help the Jharkhand cause he decided to leave the JMM. Another big reason was his turning into an approver in the scandal and accepting guilt in the case had alienated him from the JMM who had denied any wrongdoing.
- He was then approached by then general secretary of the BJP K.N. Govindacharya who offered Mahato a ticket from BJP as BJP was looking to gain a foothold in the newly forming state of Jharkhand, a fact which was slowly becoming inevitable owing to the growing strength of the demand of the movement. He became a member of the BJP in a huge rally in Ranchi where Atal Bihari Vajpayee personally attended the event testifying to the weight they were prepared to put behind Shailendra Mahato and the Jharkhand movement.
- 1998 - While considering Mahato for a ticket from Jamshedpur, the top BJP leadership saw potential in his wife Abha Mahato as an MP candidate as the ongoing case against Mahato prevented him from contesting elections, hence they went ahead and gave the ticket to her. She went on to win the 1998 election against Russy Modi who was an Ex- Tata Steel MD and a much beloved figure of Jamshedpur.
- 1999 - Abha Mahato retained her seat from Jamshedpur in an early election against Ghanshyam Mahato a Congress candidate.
- 2000 - On 15 November 2000 Jharkhand achieved statehood.

== Writing career ==
Writing has been one of the primary strengths of Mahato that has served as the foundation of his political thought. He has been a writer from his early days when he used to write for “Singhbhumi Ekta” a weekly journal that was published out of Chaibasa, from there he moved onto local newspapers like Prabhat Khabar. He had become widely respected for his writing and became known as a leader who was adept at bringing the voice of the movement to newspapers, where he either himself wrote articles or became an educated source regarding various facets like history and laws pertaining to the Jharkhandi people and movement.

Mahato's political acumen and knowledge relating to Jharkhand stems from his obsession with reading and compiling knowledge from a wide range of sources that contribute to the collective knowledge of Jharkhand, a state that severely lacks preservation of local histories.

Jharkhand Ki Samargatha is a book that is considered his magnum opus. It is a book that documents the history of the Jharkhand Andolan with details records of the people that took part in it. The book received its biggest validation when it was chosen as a primary source of identification of revolutionaries by the Jharkhand government (BJP) that started a new pension scheme for the people that fought in the Jharkhand Andolan. A small monthly amount given as a token of respect by the state. No other work has to date detailed the characters of the movement in as much detail as this book which was seen as a worthwhile tribute by Mahato to the thousands that put their lives on the line and hundreds that actually gave their lives in the revolution. This piece of history would have been lost if not for Mahato's efforts among many others in preserving it.

Bibliography
1989	Jharkhand Raj Aur Upniveshvad
1999	Desh aur Dhristi
2011	Jharkhand ki Samargatha
2021	Jharkhand me Vidroh ki Itihas
2022	Journey of Jharkhand movement (English translation of Jharkhand Ki Samargatha by Santosh Kiro)

== Other positions held ==
1991 - Chairman Adityapur Industrial Development Area.

2005 - Chairman RRDA Ranchi

== Personal life ==
He is married to Abha Mahato, also a politician.

He has two sons and lives in Sonari, Jamshedpur.

== See also ==
- Bidyut Baran Mahato
- Sunil Mahato
- Rudra Pratap Sarangi
