= Chanku Mahato =

British India freedom fighter (1816–1856)

- Born: February 9, 1816; Rangamatia, Godda District, British India
- Died: May 15, 1856 (aged 40); Bank of Kajhiya river Rajkachari, Godda
- Cause of death: Execution by hanging
- Known for: Leader of Santhal rebellion Leader of Kudmi Mahatos

Chanku Mahato (9 February 1816 – 15 May 1856) was a freedom fighter of British India hailing from Kudmi Mahato community. Born in Rangamatia village of Godda district in British India, he was one of the leaders of Santhal rebellion, who mobilized Mahatos to fight against the atrocities of Britishers.

== Overview ==
Chanku Mahato organised various movement to fight against Britishers during the Santhal rebellion. Ranabir Samaddar argues that apart from Santhals, other aboriginal inhabitants of the region like Mahatos, Kamars, Bagdis, Bagals and others also participated in the rebellion. The Mahatos were participated under leadership of Chanku Mahato. The folklore related to Santhal rebellion is like:

... Sidhu Kanu khurkhurir upare, Chand-Vairab lahare lahare; Chanku Mahato, Rama Gope lahare lahare, Challu Jolha lahare lahare.

His slogan was:

... Aapon mati, Aapon dana, Pet kati nihi debo khajna.

He was arrested by Britishers and hanged to death in Godda near Kajhiya river bank on May 15, 1856.
