= Koyalchal Sanjay Gandhi Memorial College, Nirsa =

Indian educational institute

- Type: Private
- Established: 1980
- Affiliation: Binod Bihari Mahto Koyalanchal University
- Principal: Manik Chandra Ojha (H.O.D. Economics)
- Address: Nirsa, Dhanbad, Jharkhand 828205, Dhanbad, India; 23.792045°N 86.702680°E
- Campus: Urban
- Website: https://www.ksgmcollege.in/

Koyalchal Sanjay Gandhi Memorial (abbreviated KSGM) College, Nirsa is a Co-educational degree College and is permanently affiliated to Binod Bihari Mahto Koyalanchal University, Dhanbad Aided by Government of Jharkhand and Registered by University Grants Commission under 2F and 12B. Accredited to NAAC Grade-B offers general education in all three faculties of Arts, Science and Commerce. Honours teaching offered in almost all subjects.

The Intermediate courses are run under Jharkhand Academic Council, Ranchi and The degree courses are run under Binod Bihari Mahto Koyalanchal University, Dhanbad.

== History ==
This degree College was established in the year 1980 and named Koyalchal Sanjay Gandhi Memorial (abbreviated KSGM) College by the vision of by Late. Sri. C.N. Maharaja (philanthropist) and Sri. K.S. Chatterjee.

== Location ==
KSGM College is located near the Govt. Middle School and High School Nirsa. One can reach the site from Main Road NH 19 with a walk-able distance of 1 km or by any commute available.

== Gallery ==
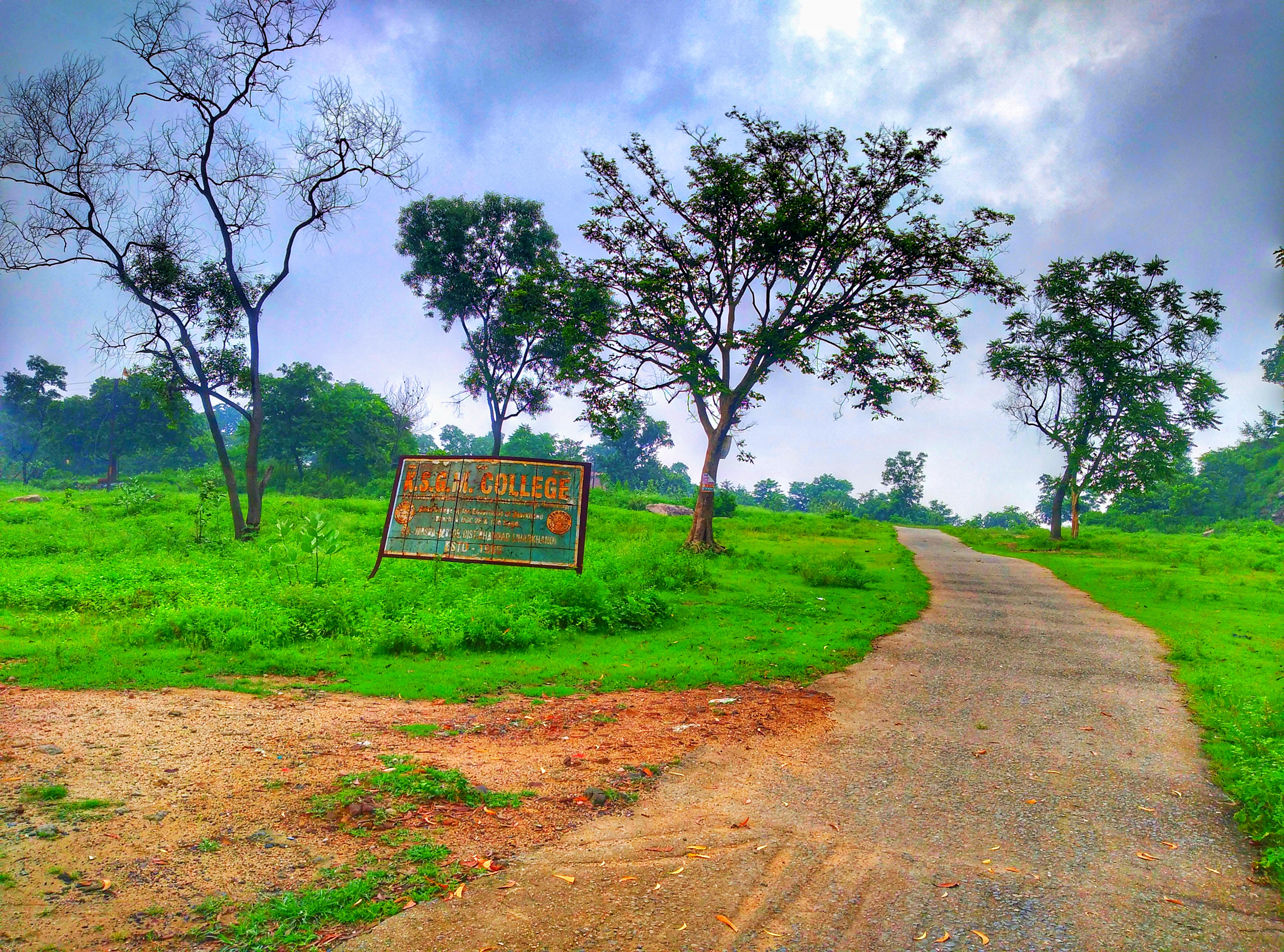
A view of a sign board on the entrance road of KSGM College Nirsa

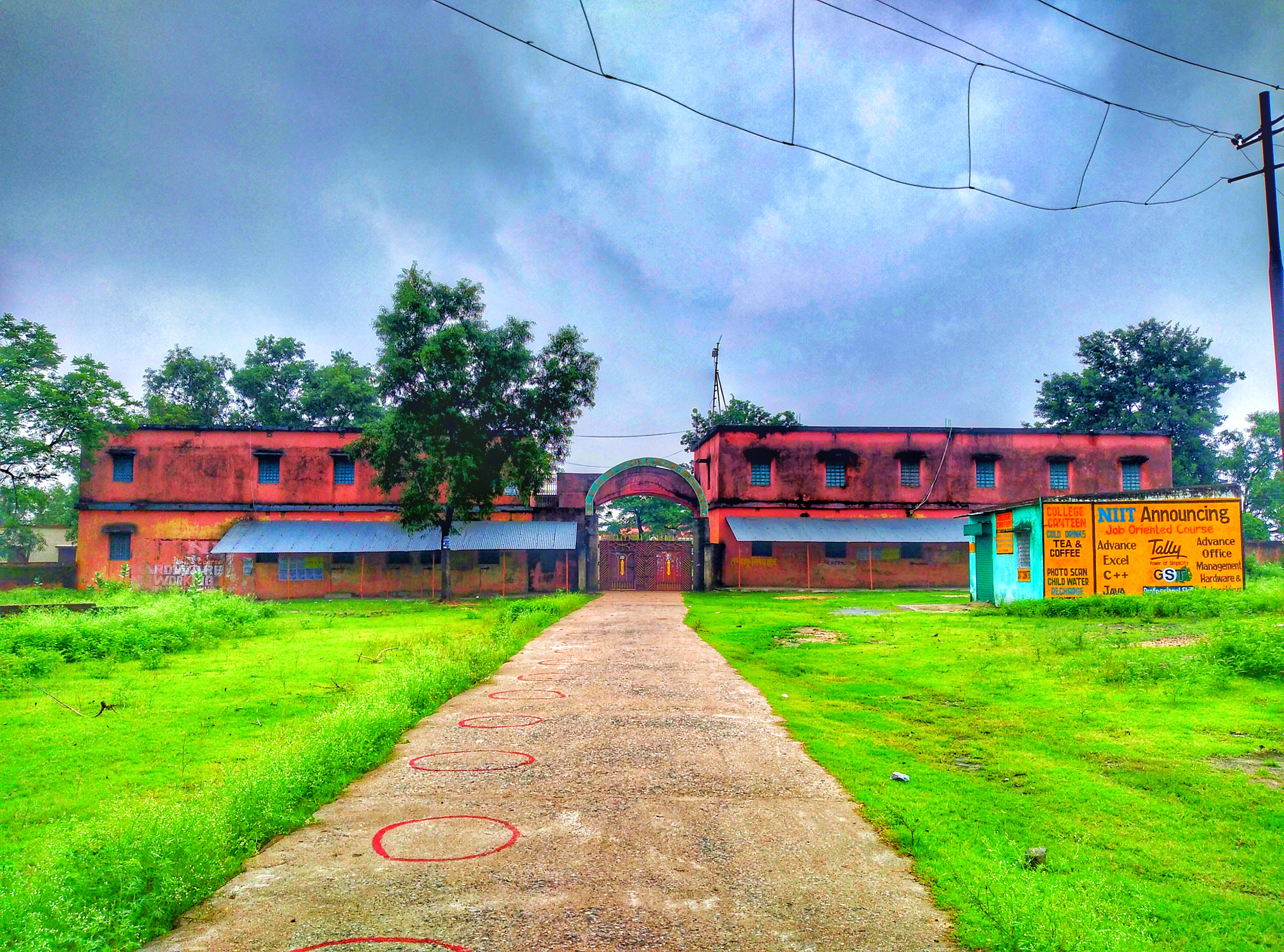
A view of main gate KSGM College Nirsa of KSGM College Nirsa

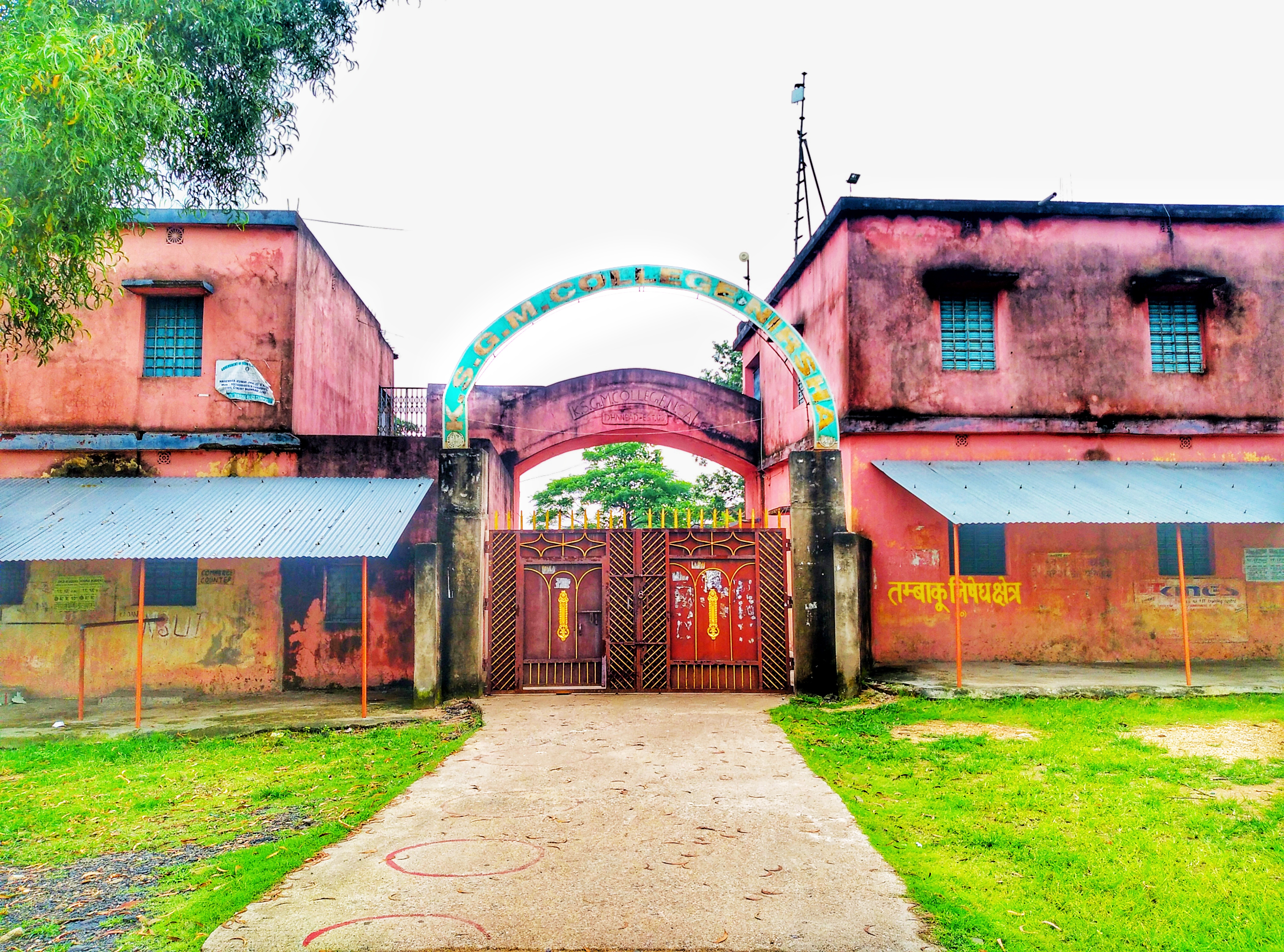
A view of main gate KSGM College Nirsa of KSGM College Nirsa

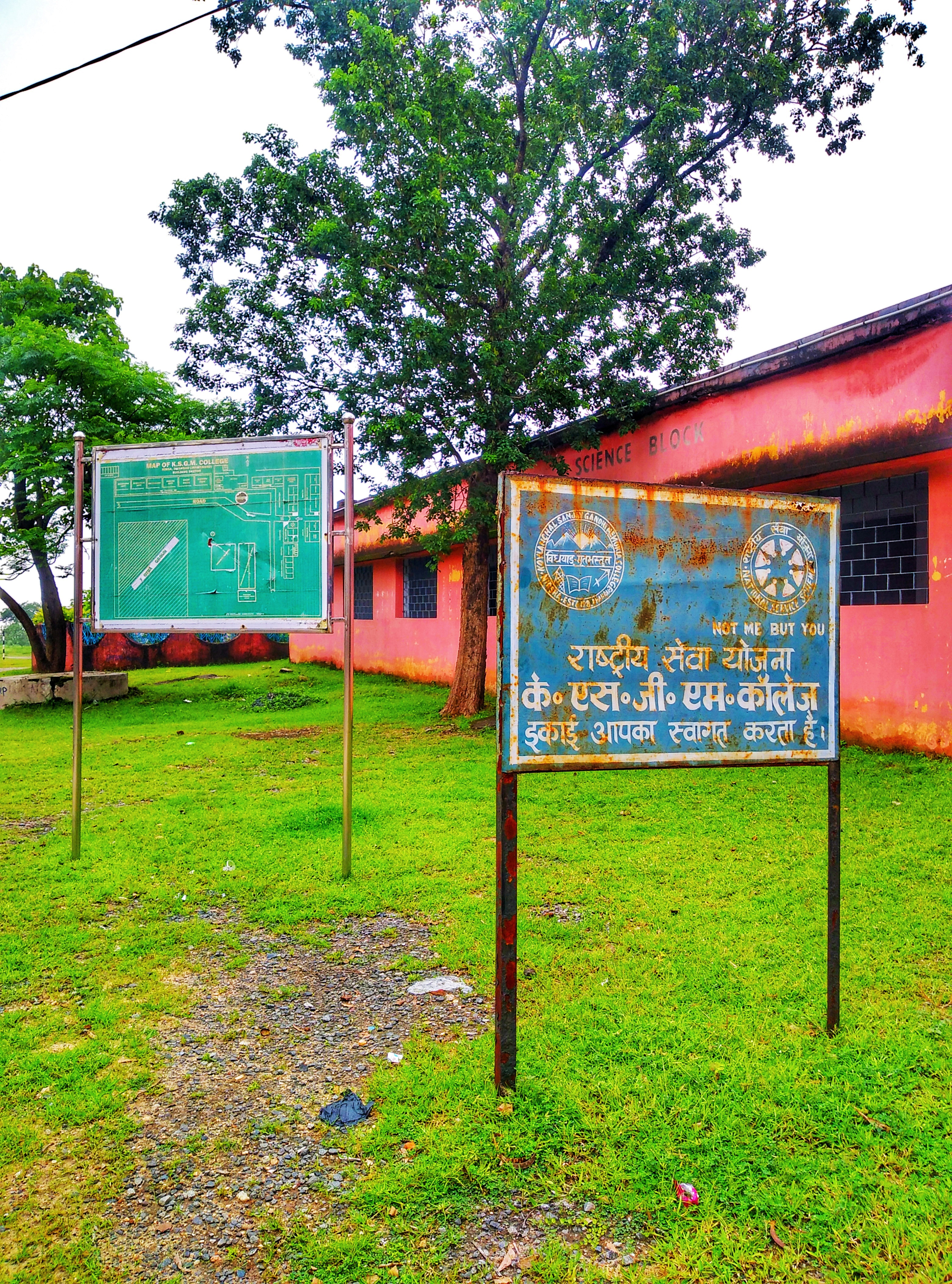
A view of Science Block & Sign boards showing college map & NSS of KSGM College Nirsa

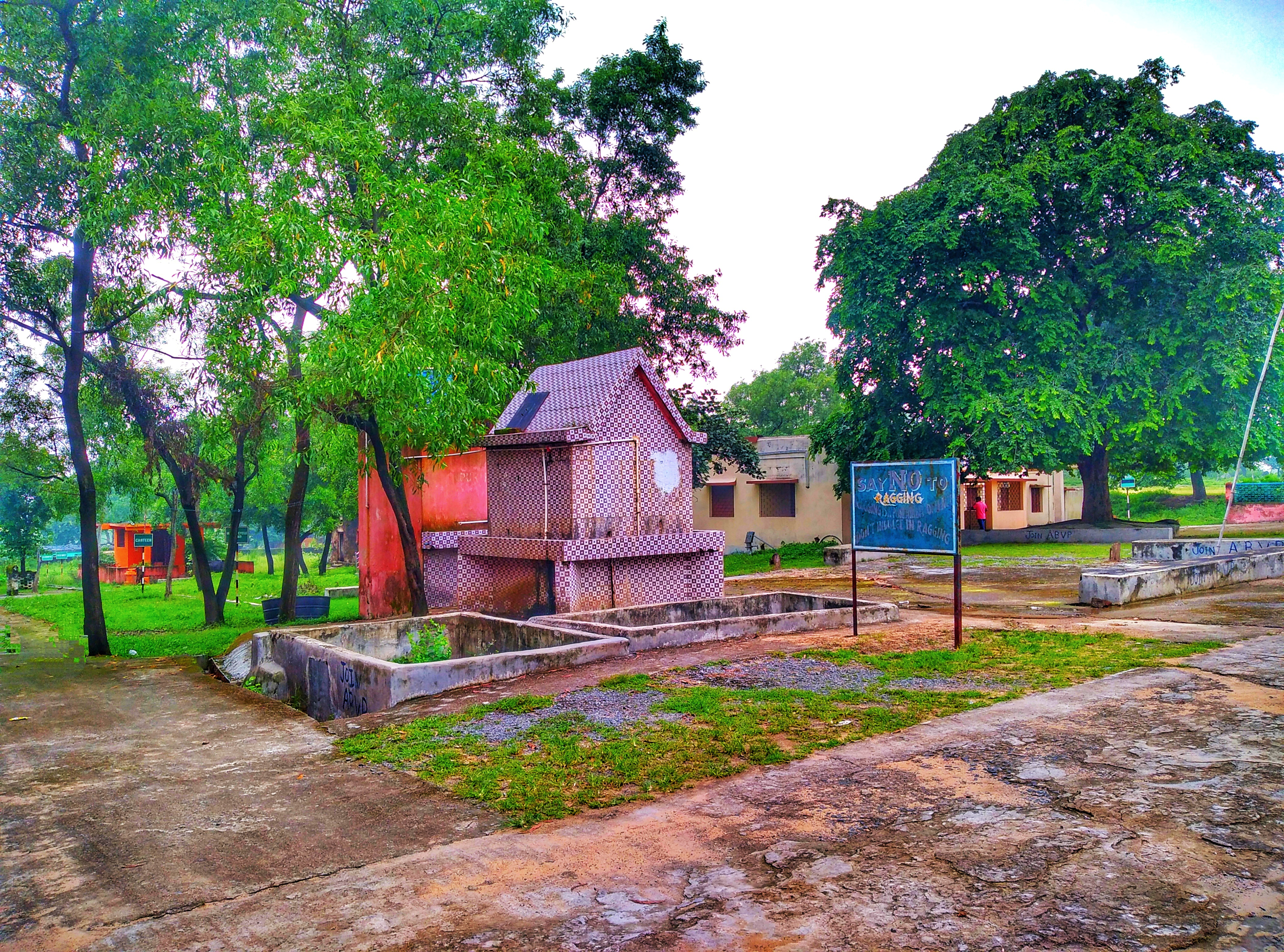
A view inside KSGM College Nirsa

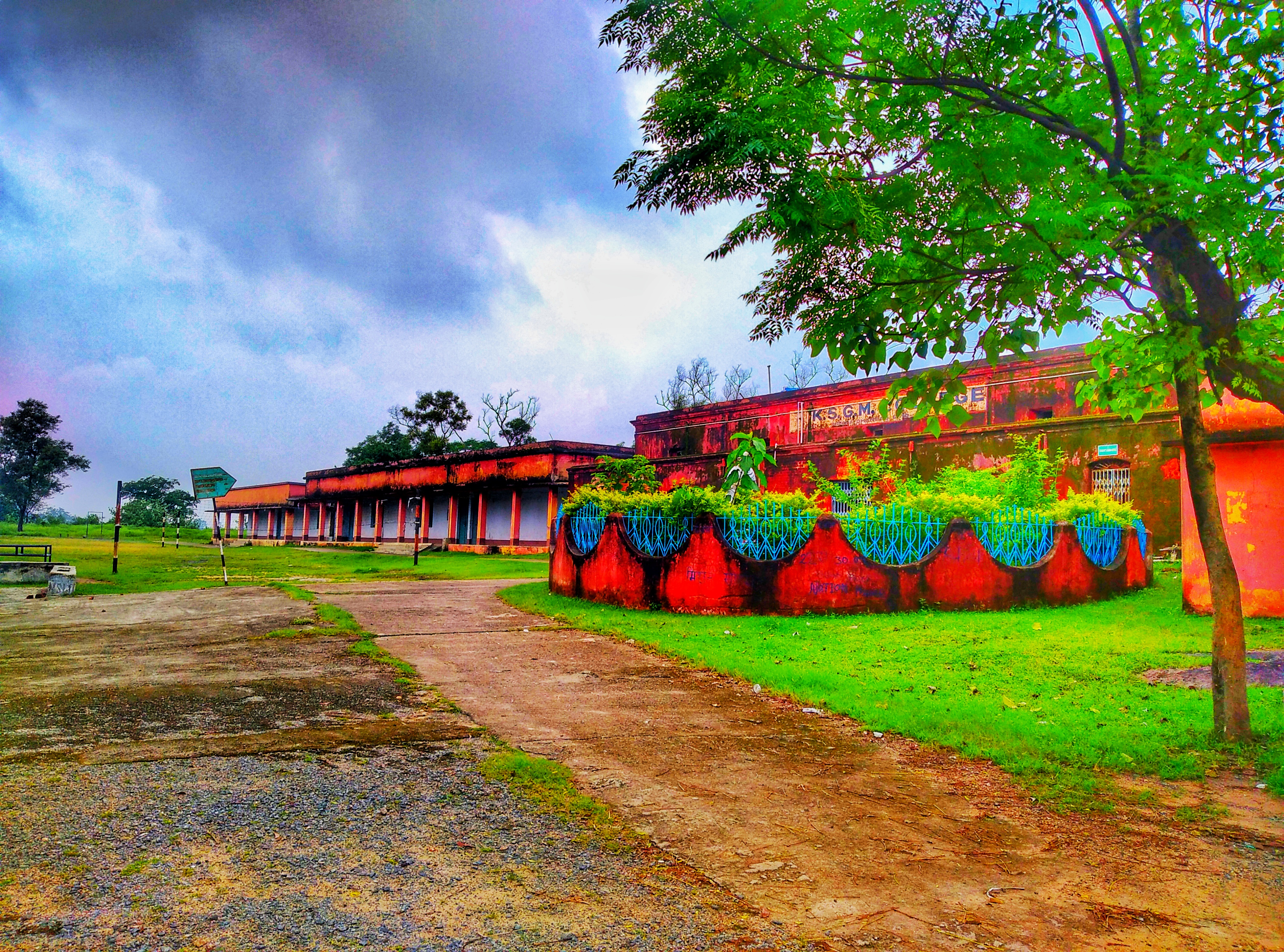
This image shows inside view of KSGM College Nirsa

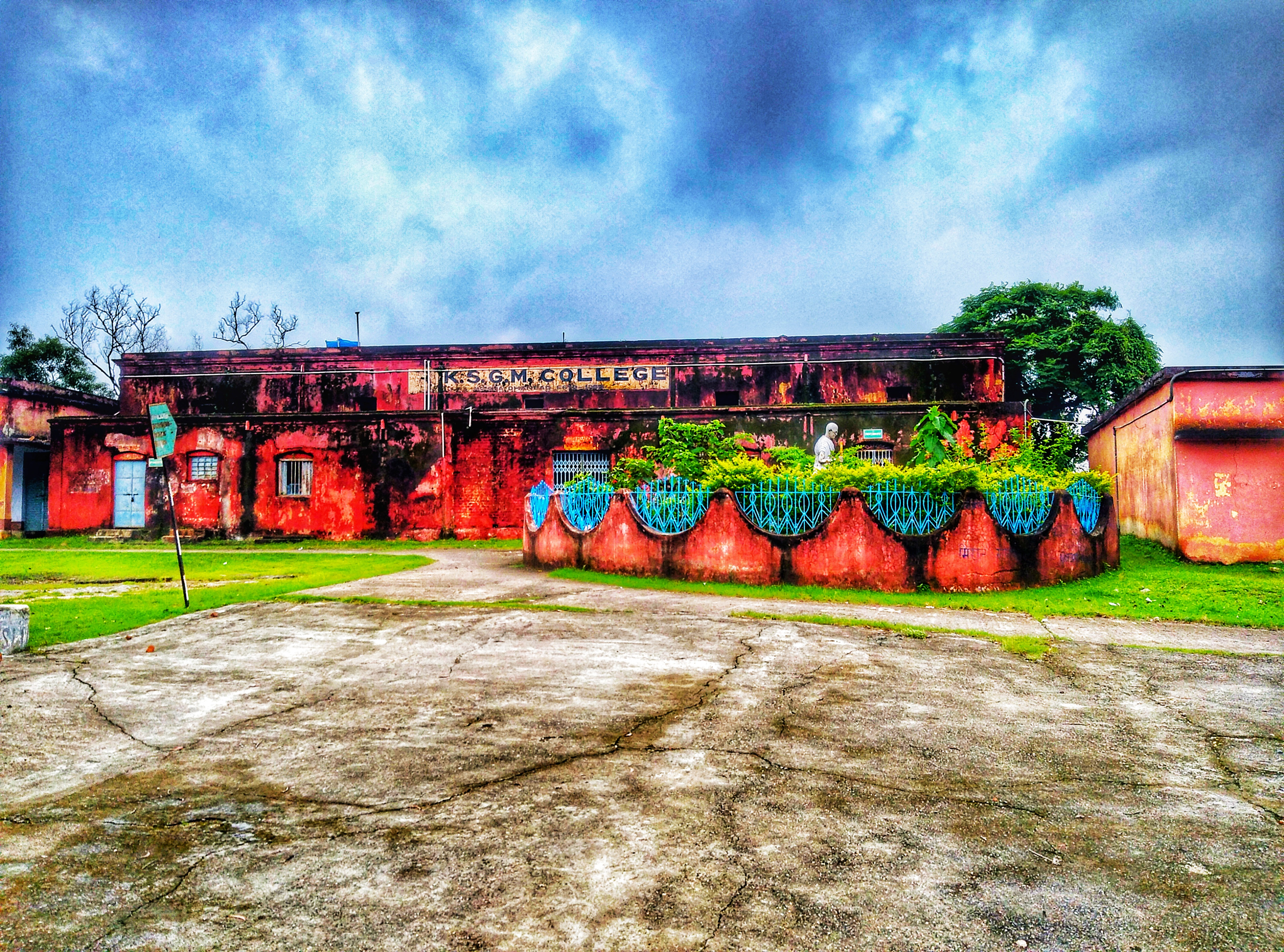
This image shows inside view of KSGM College Nirsa

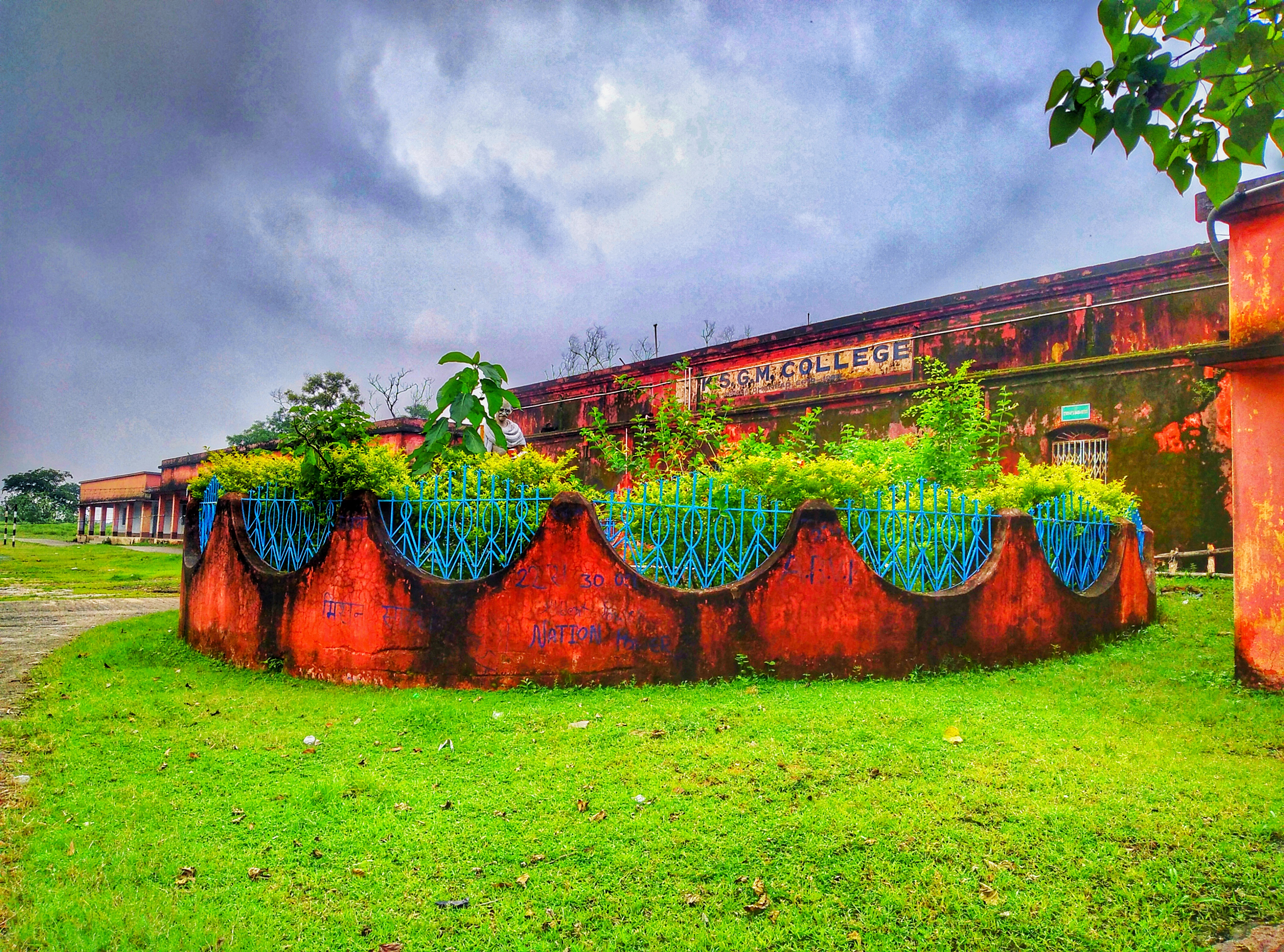
Inside view of KSGM College Nirsa

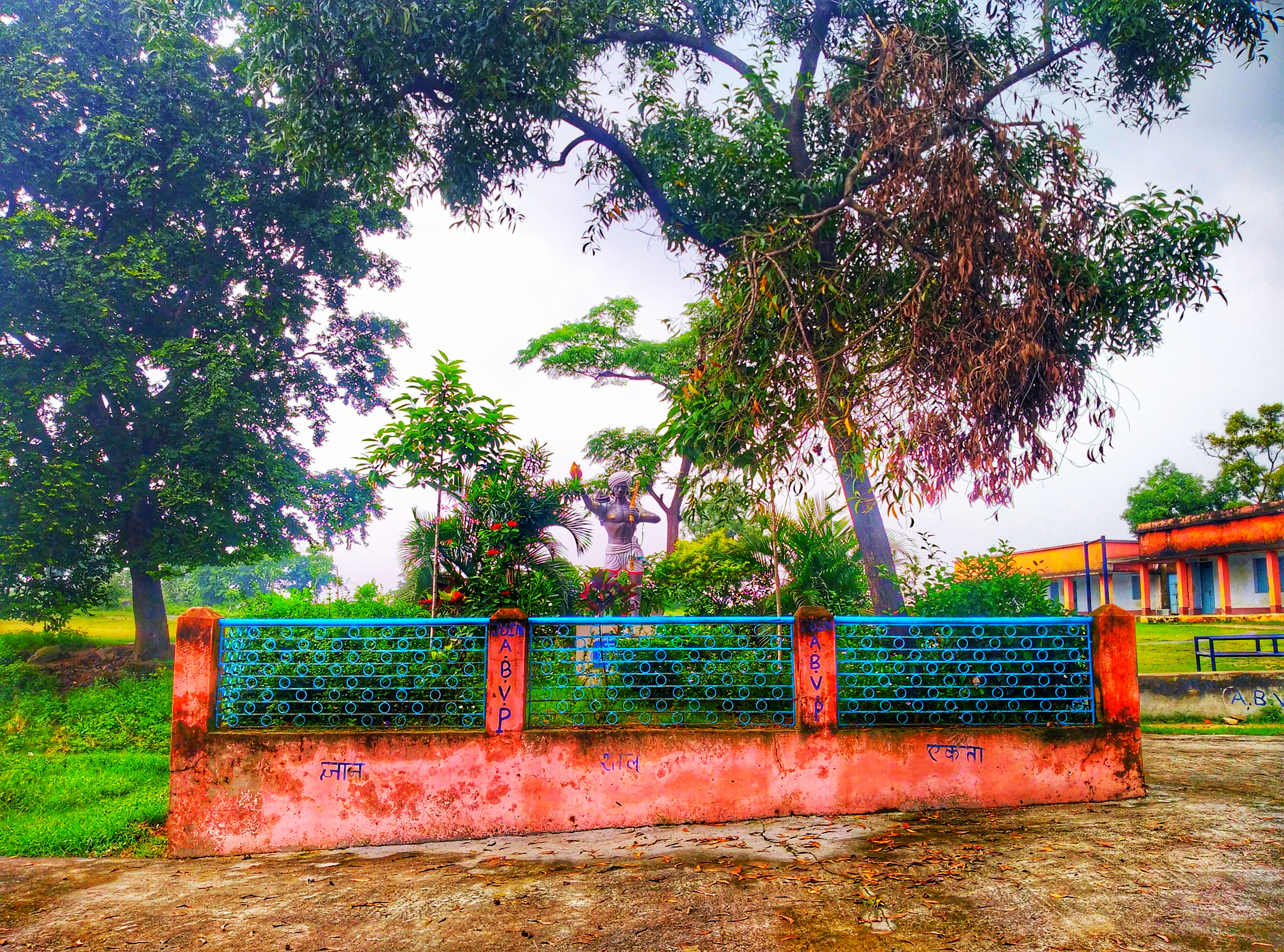
This image shows a statue of Indian freedom fighter Birsa Munda inside KSGM College Nirsa

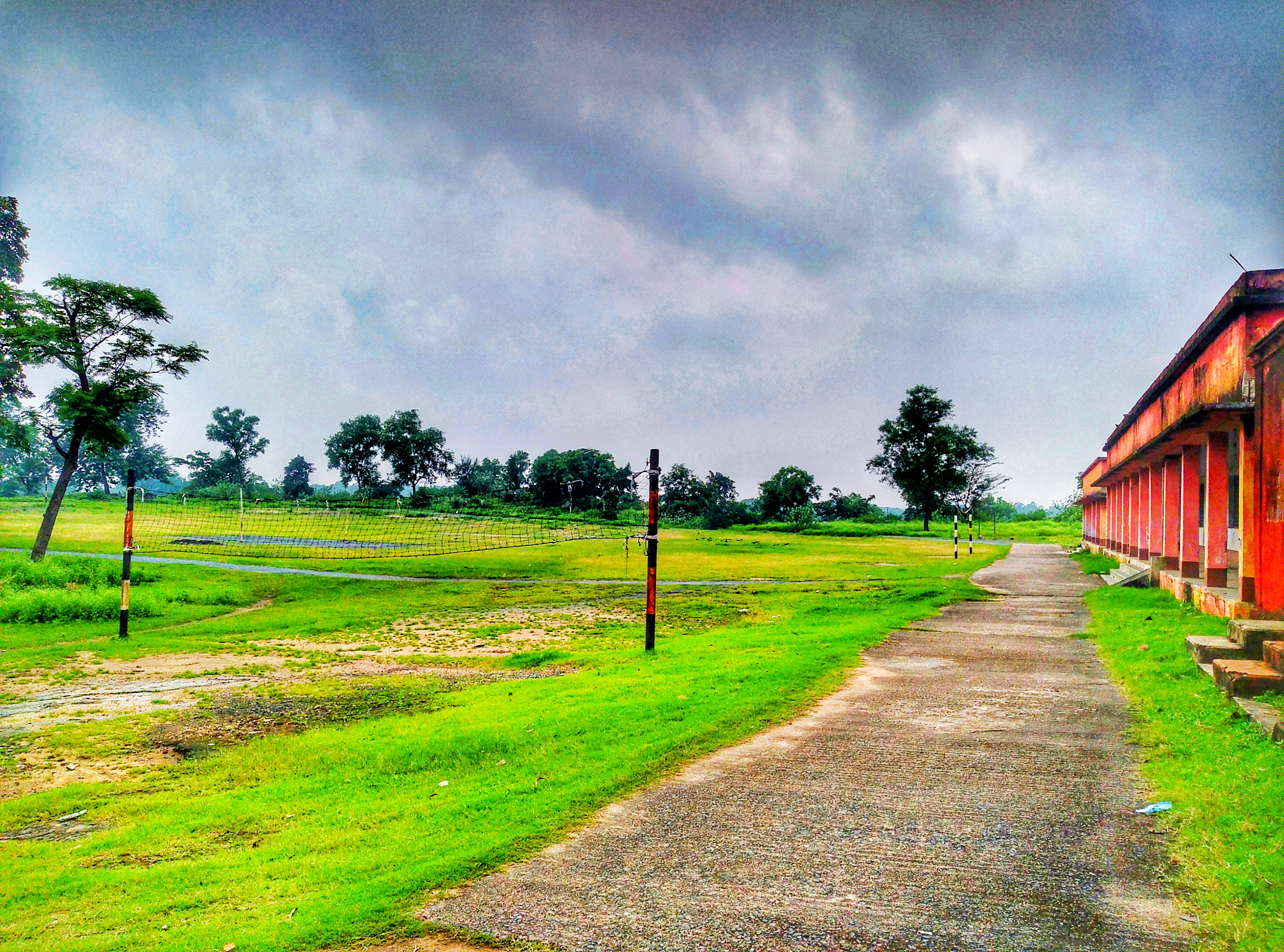
Playground view of KSGM College Nirsa

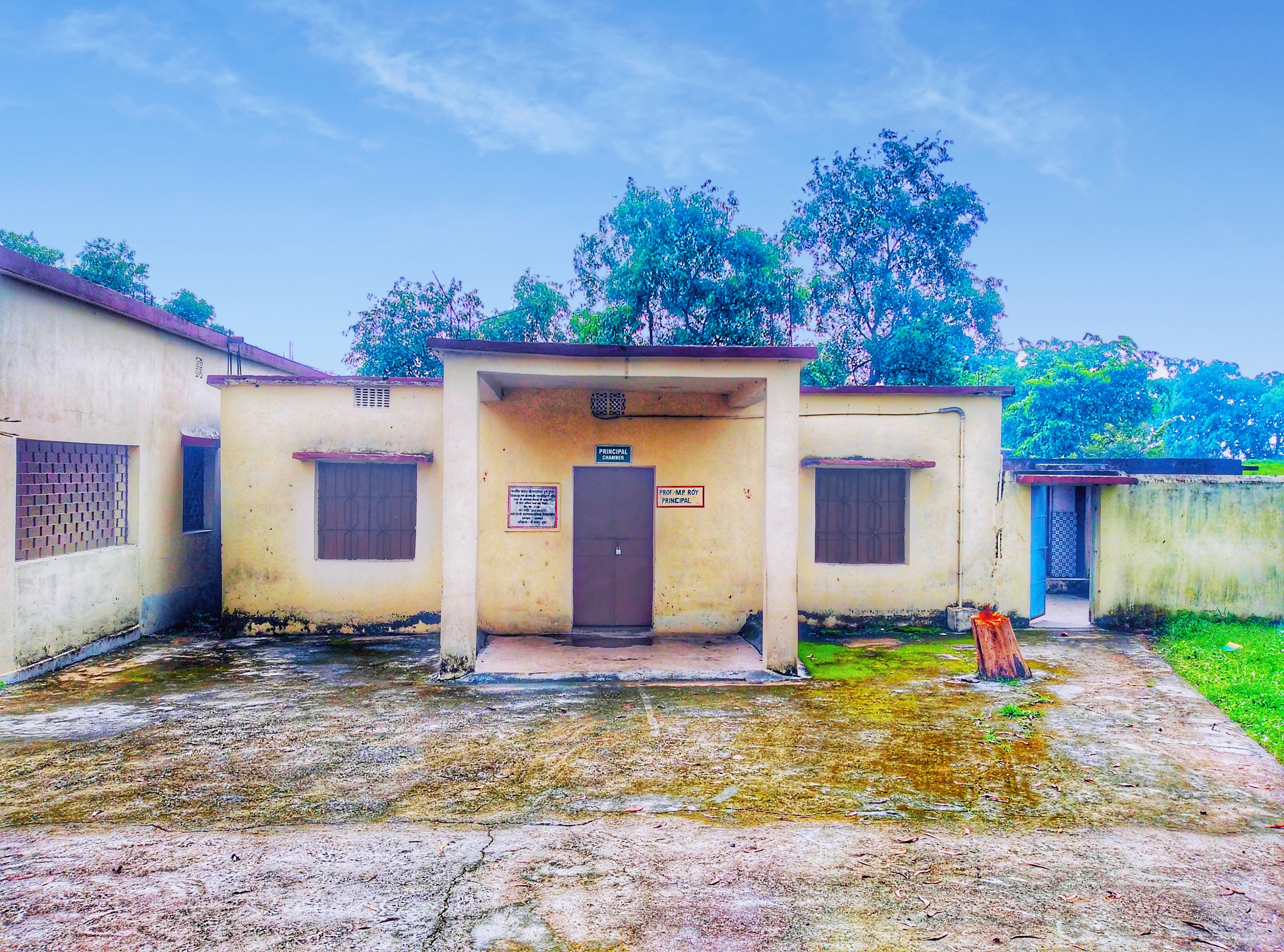
A view of Principal Chamner of KSGM College Nirsa

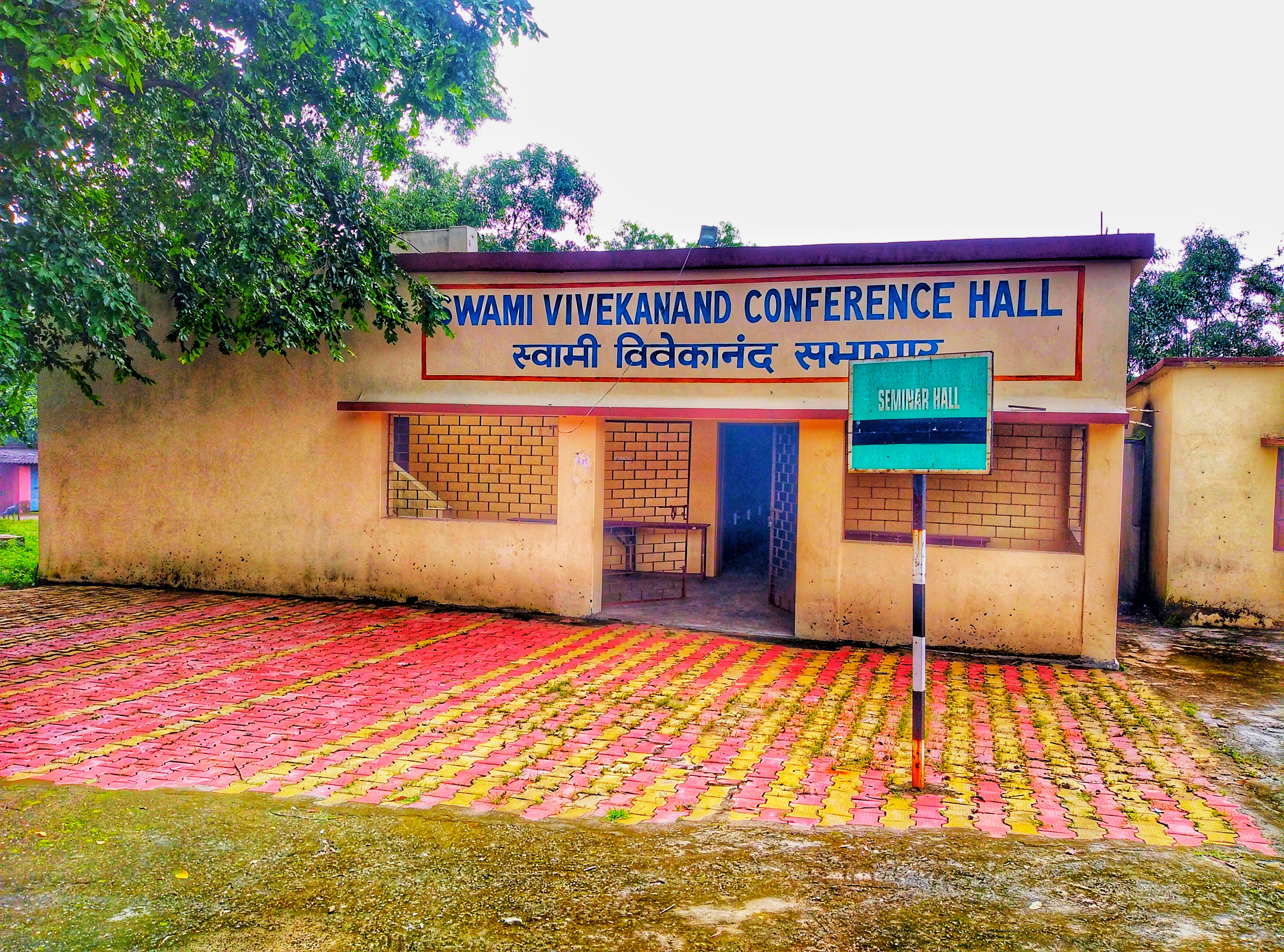
A view of Swami Vivekanand Conference Hall of KSGM College Nirsa

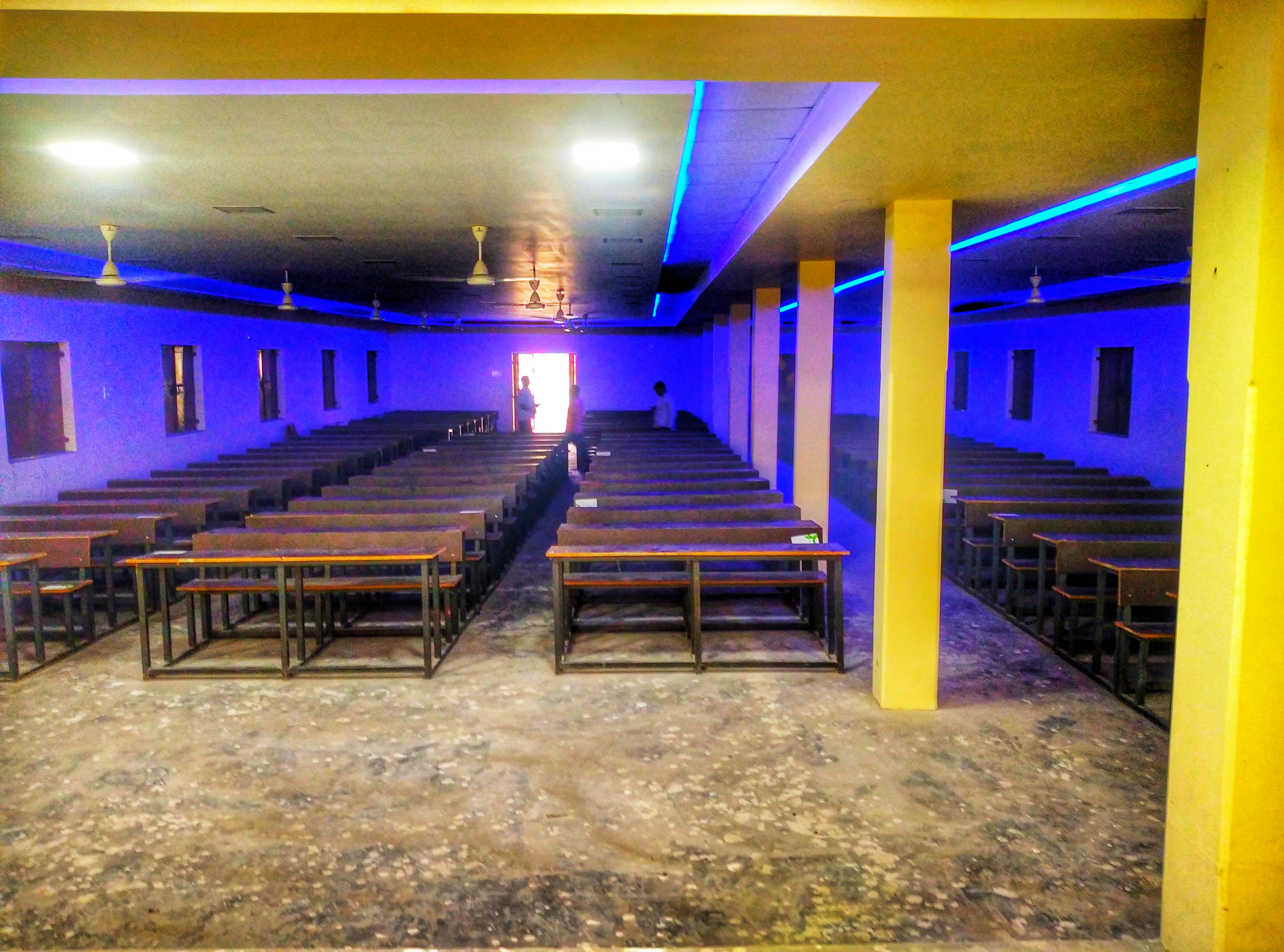
Inside view of Swami Vivekanand Conference Hall of KSGM College Nirsa

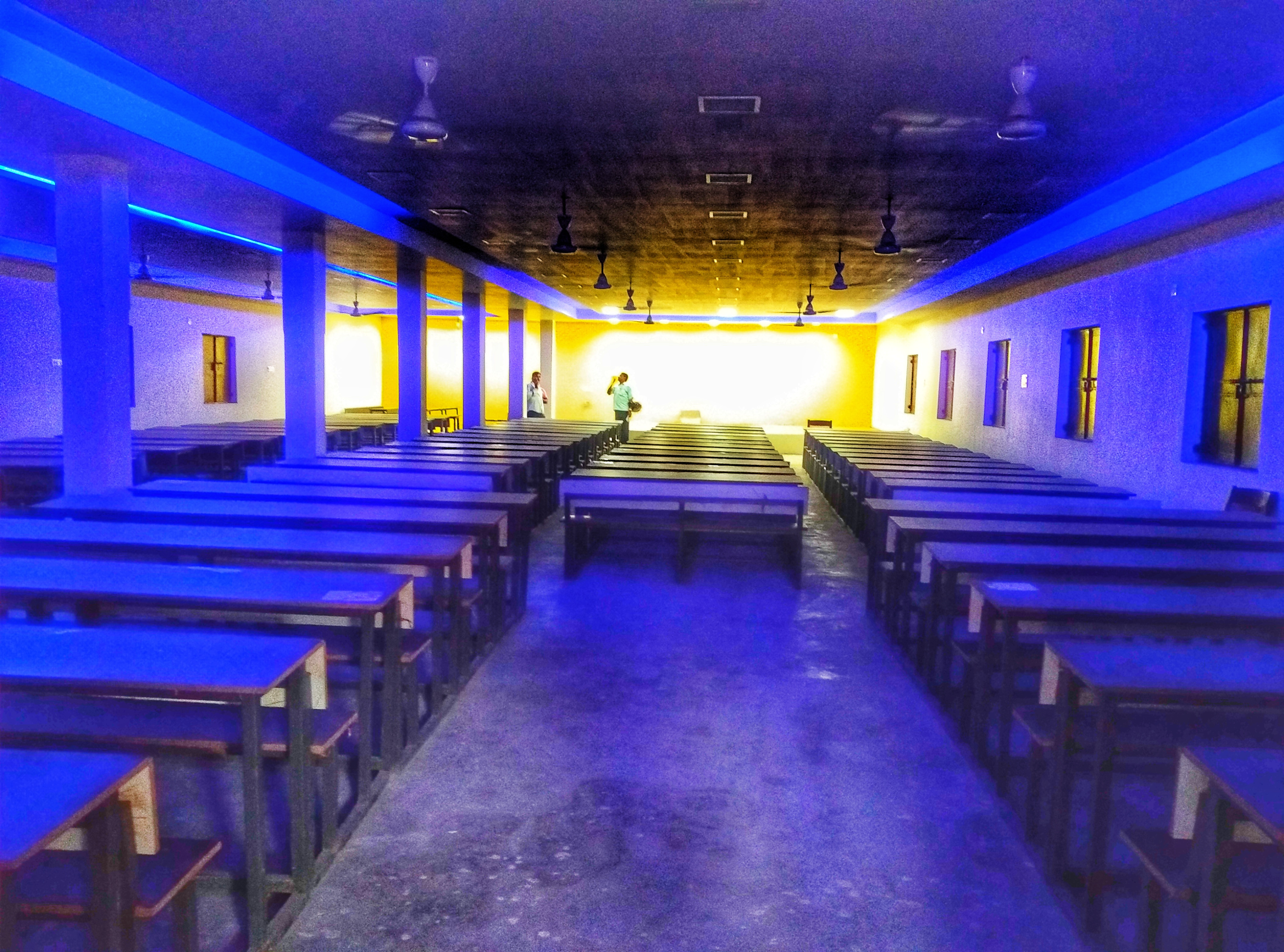
A inside view of Swami Vivekanand Conference Hall of KSGM College Nirsa
