= Sindri Assembly constituency =

Constituency of the Jharkhand legislative assembly in India

Coordinates: 23.748°N 86.706°E

Sindri
- Constituency No. 38 for the Jharkhand Legislative Assembly

Constituency details
- Country: India
- Region: East India
- State: Jharkhand
- District: Dhanbad
- Lok Sabha constituency: Dhanbad
- Established: 2000
- Total electors: 317,169
- Reservation: None

Member of Legislative Assembly
- 6th Jharkhand Legislative Assembly
- Incumbent Bablu Mahato
- Party: CPI(ML)L
- Alliance: MGB
- Elected year: 2024

Sindri Assembly constituency is an assembly constituency in the Indian state of Jharkhand.

== Members of the Legislative Assembly ==
Election	Member	Party
Bihar Legislative Assembly
Before 1967: Constituency did not exist
1967	Arun Kumar Roy	Communist Party of India
1969	Arun Kumar Roy	Communist Party of India
1972	Arun Kumar Roy	Independent politician
1977	Anand Mahato	Independent politician
1980	Anand Mahato	Independent politician
1985	Binod Bihari Mahato	Independent politician
1990	Anand Mahato	Marxist Co-ordination Committee
1995	Anand Mahato	Marxist Co-ordination Committee
2000	Phul Chand Mandal	Bharatiya Janata Party
Jharkhand Legislative Assembly
2005	Raj Kishore Mahato,	Bharatiya Janata Party
2009	Phul Chand Mandal	Jharkhand Vikas Morcha
2014	Phul Chand Mandal	Bharatiya Janata Party
2019	Indrajit Mahato	Bharatiya Janata Party
2024	Bablu Mahato	Communist Party of India (Marxist–Leninist) Liberation

== Election results ==
=== Assembly election 2024 ===
2024 Jharkhand Legislative Assembly election: Sindri
Party	Candidate	Votes	%	±%
CPI(ML)L	Chandradeo Mahato	105,136	39.64%	New
BJP	Tara Devi	1,01,688	38.34%	▲2.76
JLKM	Usha Devi	42,664	16.09%	New
NCP	Mobin Ansari	3,820	1.44%	New
NOTA	None of the Above	5,376	2.03%	▲1.23
Margin of victory		3,448	1.30%	▼2.33
Turnout		2,65,202	72.73%	▲0.98
Registered electors		3,64,662		▲14.97
CPI(ML)L gain from BJP		Swing	▲4.06	

=== Assembly election 2019 ===
2019 Jharkhand Legislative Assembly election: Sindri
Party	Candidate	Votes	%	±%
BJP	Indrajit Mahato	80,967	35.58%	▲6.59
MCC	Anand Mahato	72,714	31.95%	▲6.20
JMM	Fulchand Mandal	33,583	14.76%	▼7.03
AJSU	Sadanand Mahato	12,502	5.49%	New
JVM(P)	Ramesh Kumar Rahi	7,636	3.36%	▲1.39
AAP	Deo Nath Singh	3,862	1.70%	New
Independent	Rajesh Kumar Das	2,969	1.30%	New
NOTA	None of the Above	1,816	0.80%	▲0.29
Margin of victory		8,253	3.63%	▲0.39
Turnout		2,27,567	71.75%	▲1.45
Registered electors		3,17,169		▲10.27
BJP hold		Swing	▲6.59	

=== Assembly election 2014 ===
2014 Jharkhand Legislative Assembly election: Sindri
Party	Candidate	Votes	%	±%
BJP	Fulchand Mandal	58,623	28.99%	▲15.60
MCC	Anand Mahato	52,075	25.75%	▼0.11
JMM	Mannu Alam	44,045	21.78%	▲13.14
Independent	Sharat Dudani	7,477	3.70%	New
INC	Jai Ram Singh	7,306	3.61%	New
CPI(M)	Santosh Kumar Mahato	4,596	2.27%	New
JVM(P)	Rekha Mandal	3,980	1.97%	▼26.57
NOTA	None of the Above	1,034	0.51%	New
Margin of victory		6,548	3.24%	▲0.56
Turnout		2,02,204	70.30%	▲15.59
Registered electors		2,87,618		▲12.15
BJP gain from JVM(P)		Swing	▲0.45	

=== Assembly election 2009 ===
2009 Jharkhand Legislative Assembly election: Sindri
Party	Candidate	Votes	%	±%
JVM(P)	Phul Chand Mandal	40,048	28.54%	New
MCC	Anand Mahato	36,288	25.86%	▲3.02
BJP	Raj Kishor Mahato	18,793	13.39%	▼14.11
JMM	Duryodhan Prasad Choudhary	12,131	8.65%	▼7.17
BSP	Anwarul Haque Ansari	6,429	4.58%	New
SP	Hafijuddin Ansari	5,369	3.83%	▼12.09
LJP	Shailendra Nath Dwivedi	3,126	2.23%	▼0.48
Margin of victory		3,760	2.68%	▼1.98
Turnout		1,40,310	54.71%	▼2.24
Registered electors		2,56,466		▼2.89
JVM(P) gain from BJP		Swing	▲1.04	

=== Assembly election 2005 ===
2005 Jharkhand Legislative Assembly election: Sindri
Party	Candidate	Votes	%	±%
BJP	Raj Kishore Mahato	41,361	27.50%	▼6.01
MCC	Anand Mahato	34,358	22.84%	▼6.93
SP	Hafijuddin Ansari	23,937	15.91%	▲14.77
JMM	Mannu Alam	23,792	15.82%	▼12.40
CPI(ML)L	Meera Devi	5,440	3.62%	New
LJP	Shailendra Nath Dwivedi	4,078	2.71%	New
AJSU	Shankar Mahato	2,391	1.59%	New
Margin of victory		7,003	4.66%	▲0.93
Turnout		1,50,406	56.95%	▼4.09
Registered electors		2,64,099		▲26.79
BJP hold		Swing	▼6.01	

=== Assembly election 2000 ===
2000 Bihar Legislative Assembly election: Sindri
Party	Candidate	Votes	%	±%
BJP	Fulchand Mandal	42,604	33.51%	New
MCC	Anand Mahato	37,861	29.78%	New
JMM	Hafizudin Ansari	35,876	28.22%	New
CPI(M)	Shri Kumar Sengupta	4,178	3.29%	New
INC	Madan Mahato	3,360	2.64%	New
SP	Pannulal Singh	1,459	1.15%	New
BSP	Pradip Singh	828	0.65%	New
Margin of victory		4,743	3.73%	
Turnout		1,27,151	62.07%	
Registered electors		2,08,290		
BJP win (new seat)				

== See also ==
- Vidhan Sabha
- List of states of India by type of legislature
