= Dumri Assembly constituency =

Constituency of the Jharkhand legislative assembly in India

Coordinates: 23°59′29″N 86°00′15″E

Dumri
- Constituency No. 33 for the Jharkhand Legislative Assembly

Constituency details
- Country: India
- Region: East India
- State: Jharkhand
- District: Giridih
- Lok Sabha constituency: Giridih
- Established: 2000
- Total electors: 272,808
- Reservation: None

Member of Legislative Assembly
- 5th Jharkhand Legislative Assembly
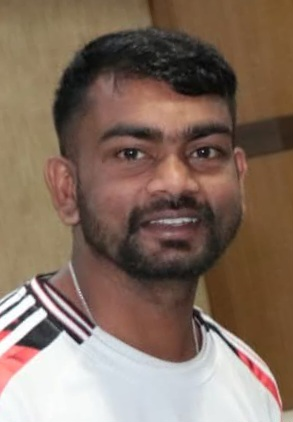
- Incumbent Jairam Kumar Mahato
- Party: JLKM
- Elected year: 2024

Dumri Assembly constituency is an assembly constituency in the Indian state of Jharkhand.

== Overview ==
Dumri police station is in Giridih district and Nawadih police station in Bermo sub-division of Bokaro district.

Dumri assembly constituency is part of Giridih (Lok Sabha constituency).

== Members of the Legislative Assembly ==
Year	Member	Party
Bihar Legislative Assembly
Before 1957: see Giridih cum Dumri constituency
1957-62: Constituency did not exist
1962	Hemlal Pragnait	Swatantra Party
1967	Shashank Manjari	Independent politician
1969	Kailashpati Singh	Janata Party
1972	Murli Bhagat	Indian National Congress
1977	Lal Chand Mahto	Janata Party
1980	Shiva Mahto	Jharkhand Mukti Morcha
1985	Shiva Mahto	Independent politician
1990	Lal Chand Mahto	Janata Dal
1995	Shiva Mahto	Jharkhand Mukti Morcha
2000	Lal Chand Mahto	Janata Dal (United)
Jharkhand Legislative Assembly
2005	Jagarnath Mahto	Jharkhand Mukti Morcha
2009	Jagarnath Mahto	Jharkhand Mukti Morcha
2014	Jagarnath Mahto	Jharkhand Mukti Morcha
2019	Jagarnath Mahto	Jharkhand Mukti Morcha
2023^	Baby Devi	Jharkhand Mukti Morcha
2024	Jairam Kumar Mahato	Jharkhand Loktantrik Krantikari Morcha

^by-election

== Election results ==
=== Assembly election 2024 ===
2024 Jharkhand Legislative Assembly election: Dumri
Party	Candidate	Votes	%	±%
JLKM	Jairam Kumar Mahato	94,496	41.80	New
JMM	Baby Devi	83,551	36.96	▼15.79
AJSU	Yashoda Devi	35,890	15.88	▼27.85
Independent	Mansur Ansari	3,732	1.65	New
NOTA	None of the Above	3,319	1.47	▼0.45
Margin of victory		10,945	4.84	▼4.18
Turnout		2,26,057	71.48	▲7.85
Registered electors		3,16,248		▲5.82
JLKM gain from JMM		Swing	▼10.95	

=== Assembly by-election 2023 ===
2023 Jharkhand Legislative Assembly by-election: Dumri
Party	Candidate	Votes	%	±%
JMM	Baby Devi	100,317	52.75	▲15.37
AJSU	Yashoda Devi	83,164	43.73	▲24.37
AIMIM	Abdul Mobin Rizvi	3,472	1.83	▼10.86
Independent	Roshan Lal Turi	1,898	1.00	New
Independent	Kamal Prasad Sahu	713	0.37	New
Independent	Narayan Giri	612	0.32	New
NOTA	None of the Above	3,650	1.92	▲0.82
Margin of victory		17,153	9.02	▼9.00
Turnout		1,90,176	64.86	▼6.12
Registered electors		2,98,857		▲9.55
JMM hold		Swing	▲15.37	

=== Assembly election 2019 ===
2019 Jharkhand Legislative Assembly election: Dumri
Party	Candidate	Votes	%	±%
JMM	Jagarnath Mahto	71,128	37.38	▼7.67
AJSU	Yashoda Devi	36,840	19.36	New
BJP	Pradeep Kumar Sahu	36,013	18.93	▼7.36
AIMIM	Abdul Mobin Rizvi	24,132	12.68	New
JD(U)	Lalchand Mahto	5,219	2.74	▼6.92
CPI	Ganesh Prasad Mahato	2,891	1.52	▼0.58
Independent	Mahendra Mahto	2,764	1.45	New
NOTA	None of the Above	2,090	1.10	New
Margin of victory		34,288	18.02	▼0.75
Turnout		1,90,289	69.75	▼0.95
Registered electors		2,72,808		▲11.43
JMM hold		Swing	▼7.67	

=== Assembly election 2014 ===
2014 Jharkhand Legislative Assembly election: Dumri
Party	Candidate	Votes	%	±%
JMM	Jagarnath Mahto	77,984	45.05	▲10.79
BJP	Lalchand Mahto	45,503	26.29	New
JD(U)	Abdul Mobin Rizvi	16,730	9.66	▼10.81
JVM(P)	Pradip Kumar Sahu	9,032	5.22	New
SP	Babulal Ravidas	4,630	2.67	New
CPI	Nunuchand Mahto	3,641	2.10	New
Independent	Mithulal Mahto	2,914	1.68	New
NOTA	None of the Above	1,046	0.60	New
Margin of victory		32,481	18.76	▲4.97
Turnout		1,73,102	70.70	▲22.81
Registered electors		2,44,827		▲18.32
JMM hold		Swing	▲10.79	

=== Assembly election 2009 ===
2009 Jharkhand Legislative Assembly election: Dumri
Party	Candidate	Votes	%	±%
JMM	Jagarnath Mahto	33,960	34.27	▼7.18
JD(U)	Damodar Prasad Mahto	20,292	20.47	▲3.64
Independent	Lalchand Mahto	19,084	19.26	New
Independent	Mithulal Mahto	3,900	3.94	New
BSP	Indra Ravidas	3,616	3.65	▲2.05
INC	Wakil Prasad Mahto	2,778	2.80	New
RJD	Tarkeshwar Mahto	2,382	2.40	▼21.18
Margin of victory		13,668	13.79	▼4.07
Turnout		99,108	47.90	▼0.87
Registered electors		2,06,919		▲0.10
JMM hold		Swing	▼7.18	

=== Assembly election 2005 ===
2005 Jharkhand Legislative Assembly election: Dumri
Party	Candidate	Votes	%	±%
JMM	Jagarnath Mahto	41,784	41.45	▲34.27
RJD	Lalchand Mahto	23,774	23.58	▲21.63
JD(U)	Damodar Prasad Mahto	16,971	16.83	▼18.52
Independent	Parshant Kumar Jaiswal	4,952	4.91	New
AJSU	Baijnath Mahto	2,487	2.47	New
Independent	Mithulal Mahto	2,463	2.44	New
BSP	Jiv Lal Turi	1,611	1.60	New
Margin of victory		18,010	17.87	▲9.40
Turnout		1,00,808	48.77	▲2.79
Registered electors		2,06,716		▲19.61
JMM gain from JD(U)		Swing	▲6.10	

=== Assembly election 2000 ===
2000 Bihar Legislative Assembly election: Dumri
Party	Candidate	Votes	%	±%
JD(U)	Lalchand Mahto	28,087	35.35	New
SAP	Jagarnath Mahto	21,362	26.89	New
INC	Maksud Alam	14,498	18.25	New
JMM	Shiva Mahto	5,704	7.18	New
SP	Mohan Lal Suman	3,984	5.01	New
Independent	Kamal Prasad	1,661	2.09	New
RJD	Gulam Rasool	1,554	1.96	New
Margin of victory		6,725	8.46	
Turnout		79,449	46.69	
Registered electors		1,72,819		
JD(U) win (new seat)				

== See also ==
- Vidhan Sabha
- List of states of India by type of legislature
