= P. K. Roy Memorial College =

College in India

- Type: Undergraduate college
- Established: 1960
- Affiliations: Binod Bihari Mahto Koyalanchal University
- Principal: Kavita singh
- Location: P.K. Roy Memorial College, Main Road Saraidhela, Dhanbad, Jharkhand, 826004, India; 23.81329°N 86.44781°E
- Campus: Urban
- Website: https://pkrmc.ac.in/

Prasana Kumar (abbreviated P K) Roy Memorial College, Dhanbad is a constituent college of Binod Bihari Mahto Koyalanchal University in Dhanbad, in the Indian state of Jharkhand. It offers courses of Intermediate, Under-Graduate and Post Graduate level in various subjects.

== History ==
The college was founded by Sh. B. N. Roy of The Roy Villa, Katrasgarh, together with his brothers in the name of their father, Prasanna Kumar Roy (popularly known by the name, P. K. Roy). It was founded to realise P. K. Roy's philanthropic aim of building a modern India through higher education and entrepreneurship. The Roy family of Katrasgarh (who later moved to Dhanbad) donated large areas of land and funding for the design and construction of the state-of-the-art college, which welcomed its first batch of students in 1960.

The Roy family also participated actively in ensuring effective administration of the college. The following generation developed the college further, and expanding further under Bijoli Kanti Roy's patronage. The Roy family has had significant impact on the youth of Jharkhand and of the city of Dhanbad by establishing the college.

In 1977 it became a constituent college of Ranchi University in Ranchi.

== Courses offered ==
College offers following courses

1. Intermediate in Science (I.Sc.)
2. Intermediate in Arts (I.A)
3. Intermediate in Commerce (I.Com)
4. Bachelors in Physics (B.Sc.)
5. Bachelors in Chemistry (B.Sc.)
6. Bachelors in Mathematics (B.Sc.)
7. Bachelors in Botany (B.Sc.)
8. Bachelors in Zoology (B.Sc.)
9. Bachelors in Geology (B.Sc.)
10. Bachelors in History (B.A.)
11. Bachelors in Economics (B.A.)
12. Bachelors in english (B.A.)
13. Post Graduate Courses in Arts, Science and Commerce (M.Sc. / M.Com. / M.A.)
14. Vocational Courses - Bachelor in Biotechnology (B.Sc.), Bachelor in Environment Science (B.Sc.).

== Location ==
P. K. Roy Memorial College, Dhanbad is located at Main Road NH 18, Saraidhela, Dhanbad.

== Faculty ==
Mathematics department -Md. Nasim Ansari

== Alumni ==
Binod Bihari Mahato (Founder Jharkhand Mukti Morcha), Dr. R. N. Bhattacharya (Neuro Surgeon, AMRI Kolkata), Prof. (Dr.) S.N. Singh (Vice Chancellor, NPU, Medininagar), Reena Jamil are some of the notable alumni who have made significant contribution on global arena.
