= Jharkhand Loktantrik Krantikari Morcha =

- Abbreviation: JLKM
- Leader: Jairam Kumar Mahato; Motilal Mahato
- President: Jairam Kumar Mahato
- Founder: Jairam Kumar Mahato
- Founded: 2024; 2 years ago
- Headquarters: Indrapuri Colony, Badhraibera, Sec-12, Bokaro, Jharkhand
- Ideology: Regionalism
- Colours: Light Green
- Seats in Rajya Sabha: 0 / 245
- Seats in Lok Sabha: 0 / 543
- Seats in Jharkhand Legislative Assembly: 1 / 81

Election symbol
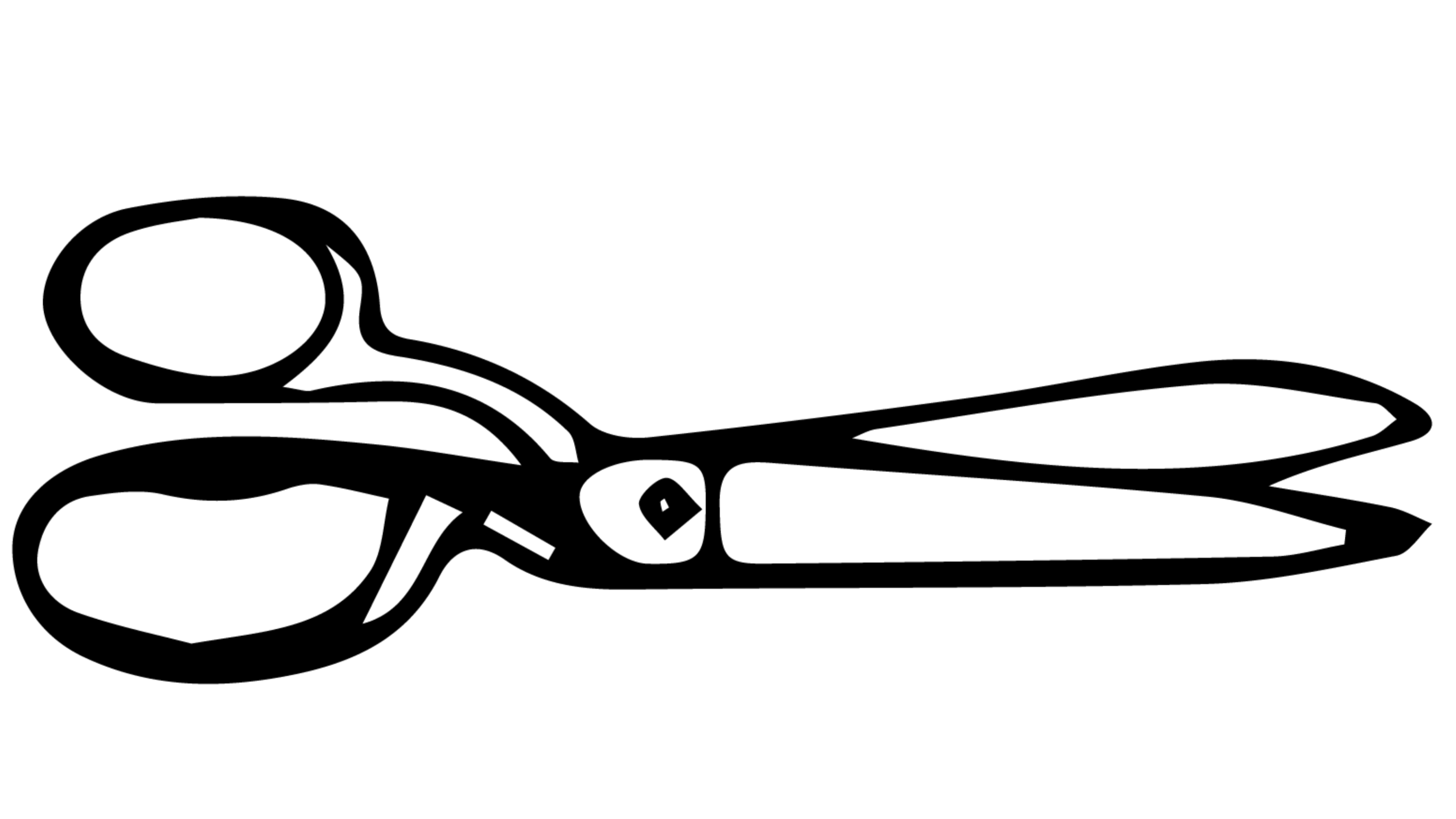

Website
- jlkmparty.org

Jharkhand Loktantrik Krantikari Morcha (lit. Jharkhand Democratic Revolutionary Front; abbr. JLKM) is a political party based in the Indian state of Jharkhand founded by Jairam Kumar Mahato in 2024. The party emerged from the Bhasha-Khatiyan Movement, which aimed to advocate for the rights of the Jharkhandi people.

Initially operating under the banner of the Jharkhandi Bhasha Khatiyan Sangharsh Samiti (JBKSS) from 2023, JLKM was officially registered as a political party with the Election Commission of India in August 2024. Scissor is its election symbol.

== History ==
=== Formation ===
Jairam Kumar Mahato, a student leader turned Language activist formed a new political party and named it Jharkhandi Bhasha Khatian Sangharsh Samiti (JBKSS) on 18 June 2023. Later on, the name of the party was changed to Jharkhand Loktantrik Krantikari Morcha (JLKM) while its registration with Election Commission of India. The formation of the party took place at Baliapur, Dhanbad.

=== 2024 elections ===
In 2024 Jharkhand Legislative Assembly election, the party contested on 68 seats. The party emerged victorious in 1 seat and claimed runner-up spot in 3 seats. The party's founding president Jairam Kumar Mahato won from Dumri Assembly constituency. In at least 16 constituencies, JLKM secured the 3rd position. The party garnered fourth-highest vote share after BJP, JMM and Congress marking a remarkable debut in the Jharkhand's Political Landscape.

== List of presidents ==
S.no	Presidents	Portrait	Term		
1.	Jairam Kumar Mahato		18 June 2023	Incumbent	2 years, 325 days

== Electoral history ==
=== Legislative Assembly election ===
Year	Seats contested	Seats won	Change in Seats	Voteshare (%)	+/- (%)	Popular vote	Outcome
Jharkhand Legislative Assembly
2024	68	1 / 81	▲ New	6.31%	▲ New	1,031,307	Opposition
West Bengal Legislative Assembly
2026	2	0 / 294	New		New		Lost

== List of MLAs ==
Jharkhand Legislative Assembly
S.No	MLAs	Portrait	Constituency	Term in Office		
1.	Jairam Kumar Mahato		Dumri	28 November 2024	Incumbent	1 year, 162 days
