= Buli Mahato =

Indian revolutionary

- Born: ? Sonahatu, Ranchi district, British India
- Died: 14 June 1834; Cellular Jail, Andaman and Nicobar Islands, British India
- Known for: Leader of Kudmi Mahatos in Bhumij rebellion and Kol uprising

Buli Mahato was a revolutionary leader of the Bhumij Rebellion and Kol Rebellion. He was a zamindar, social leader and revolutionary struggle leader of the Kudmi Kshatriya community of Karadih village in Sonahatu Thana, Jharkhand. He mostly rode on horseback.

== Biography ==
In 1831, Mahato revolted against British rule in response to exploitation under the colonial administration. He joined the Kol Rebellion as a prominent revolutionary leader in the eastern frontier areas of Silli, Tamar, Sonahatu, Jangalmahal, Ranchi district in present day Jharkhand and Barabhum, as well as Jhalda, Manbazar, Hura, Jaipur, and Baghmundi in Manbhum.

He fought alongside Govardhan Bhumij, who captured and killed an envoy sent to negotiate with Ganga Narain. Bauri Naya, one of the Ghatwals, joined Ganga Narain's forces in an attack on troops at Barabazar in May, while Mahato and Jardre Bhumij helped kill Madhav Singh. These events are associated with the Bhumij Rebellion, also known as the Ganga Narain Hungama. Later, the Kol rebellion spread through the Chotanagpur plateau region, involving both tribal and non-tribal communities.

Kudmali folk songs from Barabhum also mention revolutionary leaders such as Jagannath Dhal, Lal Singh, Ganga Narain, and Mahato. Mahato played a significant role in expanding the rebellion across the Chotanagpur plateau, seeking to reclaim land from exploitative revenue policies and moneylenders. According to sources, Mahato's bravery and solidarity challenged both the British authorities and local landlords.Some believe this reflected their Kshatriya heritage.

Mahato was arrested by British forces at the village of Jhunjhka in Purulia district and deported to the Andaman and Nicobar Jail, where he died on 14 June 1834.
