= Ranabir Samaddar =

Indian political scientist

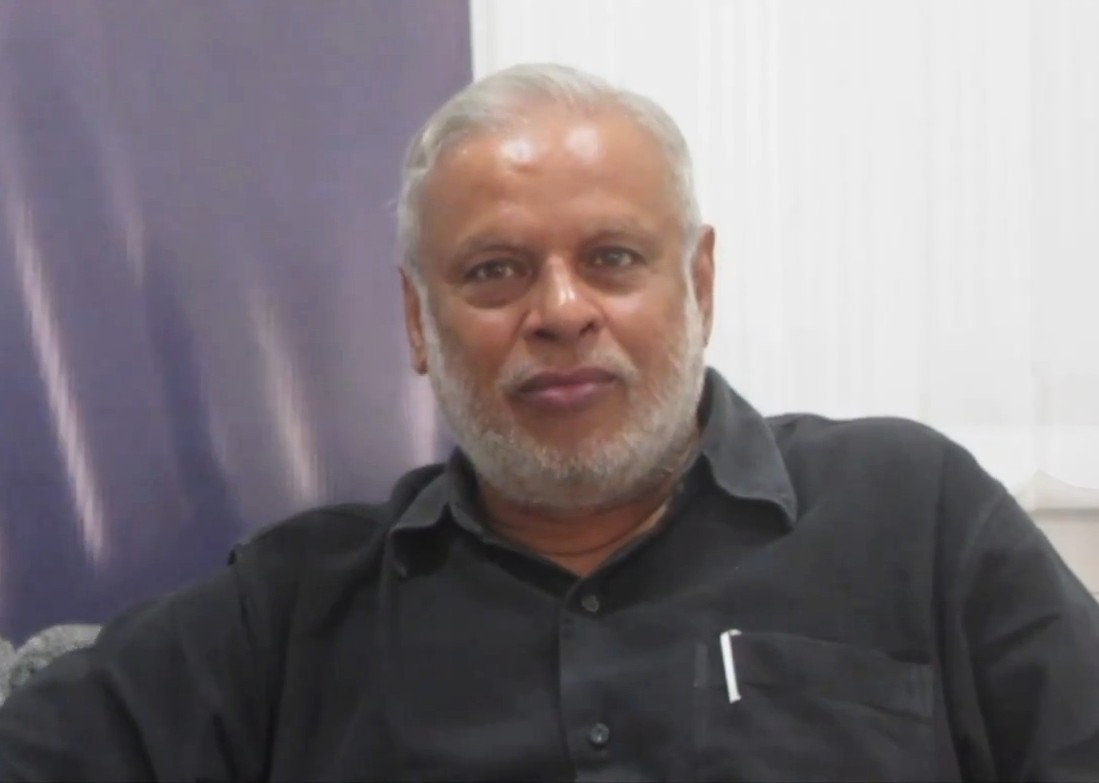
- Born: 28 September 1949 (age 76)
- Citizenship: Indian

Academic background
- Education: B.A, M.A, PhD
- Alma mater: Calcutta University
- Thesis: Economics, Politics and The Age of Electronics - A Case Study of Automation in the Indian Newspaper Industry

Academic work
- Discipline: Political Science
- Sub-discipline: Migration, Refugee Studies, Peace Studies, Nationalism, Post-colonial Statehood, Labour Studies

Ranabir Samaddar is an Indian political scientist. He holds the Distinguished Chair in Migration and Forced Migration Studies at the Mahanirban Calcutta Research Group. He was a PRIO Global Fellow from 2014–2017.

== Studies and early career ==
He completed his B.A. in political science from Presidency College (now Presidency University). Thereafter, he proceeded to his M.A. and Ph.D from Calcutta University.

Between 1977 and 1980, he served as a school teacher at the Kishore Bharati Dum Dum School, 24 Paraganas (West Bengal).

He is the founder-editor of the journal, Refugee Watch.

== Books ==
- Karl Marx and the Postcolonial Age (New York: Palgrave McMillan, 2017)
- A Postcolonial Enquiry into Europe’s Debt and Migration Crisis (Singapore: Springer, 2016)
- The Crisis of 1974: The Railway Strike and the Rank and File (Delhi: Primus, 2016)
- Ideas and Frameworks of Governing India (London and New York: Routledge, 2016)
- Neo-liberal Strategies of Governing India (London and New York: Routledge, 2016)
- Krishna Living with Alzheimer’s (Delhi: Women Unlimited, 2015)
- Passive Revolution in West Bengal – 1977-2011 (New Delhi: Sage, 2013)
- The Nation Form (New Delhi: Sage, 2012)
- Emergence of the Political Subject (New Delhi: Sage, 2010)
- Politics of Dialogue – Living Under the Geopolitical Histories of War and Peace (Aldershot, UK: Ashgate, 2004)
- In the Time of Nationalism – Political Essays on Bangladesh (Dhaka: University Press Limited, 2002)
- A Biography of the Indian Nation, 1947-1997 (New Delhi: Sage Publications, 2001)
- Marginal Nation – Trans-border Migration from Bangladesh to India (New Delhi: Sage Publications, 1999)
- Memory, Power, Identity – Politics in Jungle Mahals, West Bengal 1890-1950 (Hyderabad: Orient Longman, 1997; revised edition, 2013))
- Whose Asia Is It Anyway -- Region and the Nation in South Asia (Calcutta: MaulanaAbulKalam Azad Institute of Asian Studies and Pearl Publishers, 1996)
- Workers and Automation -- The Impact of New Technology on the Newspaper Industry (New Delhi: Sage Publications)
