= Jairam Kumar Mahato =

Indian politician (born 1994)

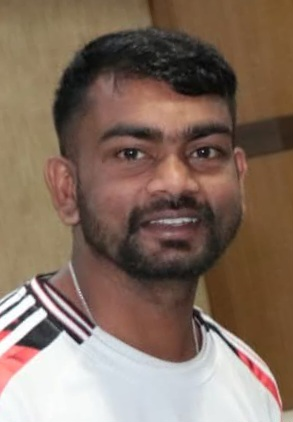
- Mahato in 2025

Member of the Jharkhand Legislative Assembly
- Incumbent
- Assumed office 23 November 2024
- Preceded by: Baby Devi
- Constituency: Dumri

President of the Jharkhand Loktantrik Krantikari Morcha
- Incumbent
- Assumed office 18 June 2023
- Preceded by: Office established

Personal details
- Born: September 27, 1994 (age 32) Mantand, Dhanbad district Jharkhand, India
- Party: Jharkhand Loktantrik Krantikari Morcha
- Parent: Krishna Prasad Mahato
- Education: Vinoba Bhave University (BA, MA)
- Nickname: Tiger

Jairam Kumar Mahato (born 27 September 1994), popularly known as Tiger Jairam, is an Indian activist and politician. He is serving as a member of the Jharkhand Legislative Assembly from the Dumri Assembly constituency, representing the Jharkhand Loktantrik Krantikari Morcha, a newly formed political party for safeguarding Jharkhandi local languages and cultural heritage.

Mahato is the leader of the Jharkhand Loktantrik Krantikari Morcha, formerly known as the Jharkhandi Bhasha Khatiyan Sangharsh Samiti. He contested the 2024 Jharkhand Legislative Assembly election from the Dumri and Bermo seats. He registered a historic win from the Dumri seat by defeating sitting minister Baby Devi but lost the Bermo seat, claiming the second spot.

== Early life and education ==
Jairam Kumar Mahato was born to Krishna Prasad Mahato on 27 September 1994 at Mantand village of Topchanchi, Dhanbad. Mahato hails from a family deeply connected to Jharkhand's statehood movement. His father was an organizer in the movement for Jharkhand's statehood. He was just two years old when his father lost his life from head injuries sustained during a protest.

He completed his Master of Arts in English from P. K. Roy Memorial College, Dhanbad, under Vinoba Bhave University in 2017. He is pursuing a PhD from the Binod Bihari Mahto Koyalanchal University, which is expected to be completed in 2026.

== Career ==
Jairam Kumar Mahato contested the 2024 Indian general election from the Giridih Lok Sabha constituency as an independent candidate at the age of 29. He received 347,322 votes and finished in third place, behind Mathura Prasad Mahato of the Jharkhand Mukti Morcha in second place and the winner, Chandra Prakash Choudhary of the All Jharkhand Students Union.

== Controversy ==
In August 2026, a controversy arose after a purported audio recording of a WhatsApp call between Mahato and Ravi Kumar, the officer-in-charge of the Barwadda police station in Dhanbad, went viral on social media. In the recording, Mahato was allegedly heard using abusive language against the officer. The incident escalated from an earlier dispute between Mahato and a local mukhiya representative at the police station, during which Mahato's supporters reportedly created a ruckus and obstructed official work. Following this, the Dhanbad police registered a First Information Report (FIR) against Mahato and nine others for obstructing government work.

Mahato denied the allegations, claiming the audio clip had been edited and selectively circulated to damage his reputation. He accused the police officer of intentionally leaking the clip and alleged corruption at local police stations, claiming bribes of ₹5,000 were routinely collected from sand-laden vehicles to allow them passage. The Jharkhand Police Men’s Association demanded a public apology from Mahato within 24 hours and threatened a phased agitation if he failed to comply.

== Electoral history ==
=== Indian general elections ===
Year	Constituency	Party	Votes	%	Result
2024	Giridih	Independent	347,322	27.46	Lost

=== Jharkhand Legislative Assembly elections ===
Year	Constituency	Party	Votes	%	Result
2024	Bermo	JLKM	60,871	27.21	Lost
2024	Dumri	JLKM	94,496	41.80	Won
