= Sijua, Bokaro =

Sijua
- Census Town
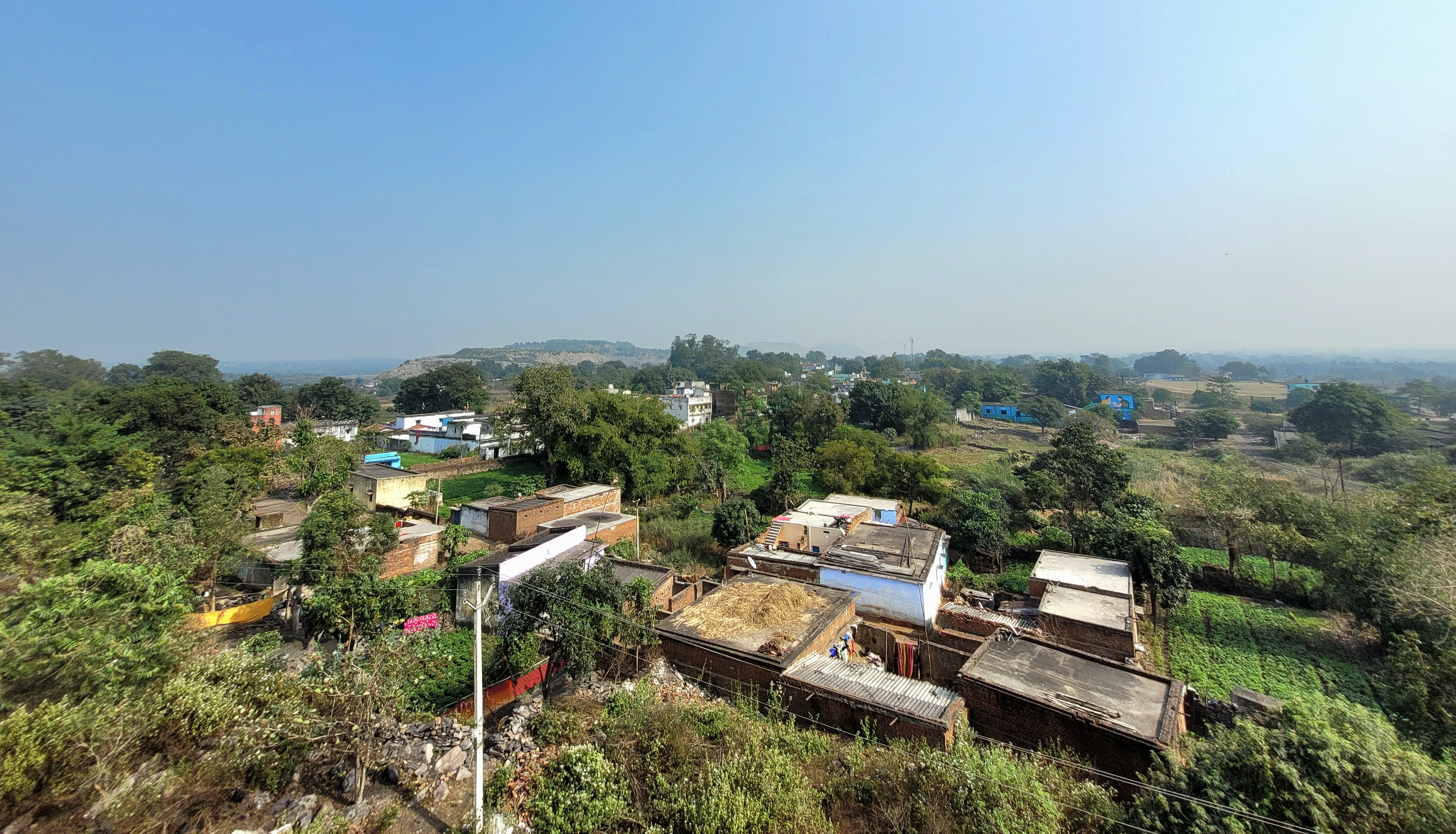
- Residential houses in Sijua Basti

- Location in Jharkhand, India Sijua (India)
- Coordinates: 23.7691°N 86.1674°E
- Country: India
- State: Jharkhand
- District: Bokaro

Area
  - Total: 2.18 km^{2} (0.84 sq mi)
- Elevation: 205 m (673 ft)

Population (2022)
  - Total: 3,601
  - Density: 1,650/km^{2} (4,280/sq mi)

Languages
  - Official: Hindi, English
  - Spoken: Khortha
- Time zone: UTC+5:30 (IST)
- PIN: 828307
- Census Code (Sijua): 362291
- Telephone/STD: 06549
- Vehicle registration: JH-09
- Lok Sabha constituency: Giridih
- Vidhan Sabha constituency: Bermo
- Website: bokaro.nic.in

Sijua is a Census town and Gram Panchayat in the Chandrapura CD Block in the Bermo subdivision of the Bokaro district in the state of Jharkhand, India. The Sijua Gram Panchayat consists of mainly SC & OBC Populations.

== Geography ==
Cities, towns and locations in Bokaro district in North Chotanagpur Division
M: municipal town, CT: census town, R: rural/ urban centre, F: Factory, A: Coal Mining Area
Abbreviation used: TPS – Thermal Power Station
Owing to space constraints in the small map, the actual locations in a larger map may vary slightly

=== Location ===
Sijua is situated to the North - West of Chandrapura (community development block) at 23.7691°N 86.1674°E.

=== Area overview ===
Bokaro district consists of undulating uplands on the Chota Nagpur Plateau with the Damodar River cutting a valley right across. It has an average elevation of 200 to 540 metres (660 to 1,770 ft) above mean sea level. The highest hill, Lugu Pahar, rises to a height of 1,070 metres (3,510 ft). The East Bokaro Coalfield located in the Bermo-Phusro area and small intrusions of Jharia Coalfield make Bokaro a coal rich district. In 1965, one of the largest steel manufacturing units in the country, Bokaro Steel Plant, operated by Steel Authority of India Limited, was set-up at Bokaro Steel City. The Damodar Valley Corporation established its first thermal power station at Bokaro (Thermal). The 5 kilometres (3.1 mi) long, 55 metres (180 ft) high earthfill dam with composite masonry cum concrete spillway, Tenughat Dam, across the Damodar River, is operated by the Government of Jharkhand. The average annual rainfall is 1,291.2 millimetres (50.83 in). The soil is generally infertile and agriculture is mostly rain-fed.

== Demographics ==
As of 2011 Census of India, there are total 890 families residing in the Sijua town. The total population of Sijua is 3601 out of which 1852 [ 51.43% ] are males and 1749 [ 48.56% ] are females thus the Sex Ratio of females per thousands of males in sijua gram panchayat is 944. The population of children of age between 0–6 years in sijua is 597 which is 14% of the total population. There are 327 male children and 270 female children between the age 0–6 years. Thus as per the 2011 Census of India the Child Sex Ratio of Sijua is 826 which is less than Average Sex Ratio (924). The Sijua Gram Panchayat Consists Of the following villages which is Ghutve, Sijua Pahadi, Bokaro Jharia & Itself Sijua. As per the Census of India, the literacy rate of Sijua is 73.3%. Thus Sijua has higher literacy rate compared to 72% of Bokaro district. The male literacy rate is 83.98% and the female literacy rate is 61.93% in Sijua. As per the 2011 Census of India, the total Hindu population in Sijua is 3488 which is 96.87% of the total population. Also the total Muslim population in Sijua is 44 which is 1.21% of the total population. Below is religion-wise population of Sijua as per Census 2011.

== Government and politics ==
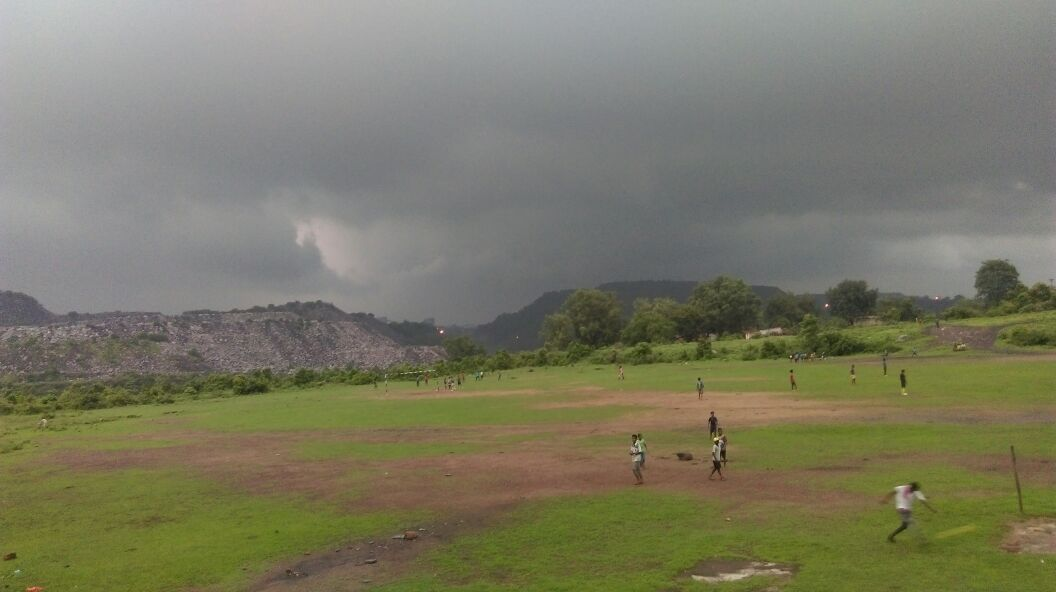

Sijua Gram panchayat is the Local self-government of the village. There are wards, each represented by an elected ward member. The establishment of the gram panchayat Reserved for SC - Female sijua is in the year 2015.

== Education ==
As per the school information report for the academic year 2019–20, the village has a total of 5 school. These school include 4 Government school and 1 Private Unaided School.

== See also ==
- List of cities in Jharkhand by population
