= Shiva Mahto =

Indian politician

Member of the Bihar Legislative Assembly
- In office 1980–1985
- Constituency: Dumri Assembly constituency
- In office 1985–1990
- In office 1995–2000

Personal details
- Party: Jharkhand Mukti Morcha
- Profession: Politician

Shiva Mahto was an Indian politician and three time Member of Bihar Legislative Assembly from Dumri Assembly constituency in undivided Bihar. Mahto was one of the prominent participant in 'Jharkhand movement', which demanded separate state of Jharkhand to be created by dividing the state of Bihar in 1970s. He was also known for his endeavour to spread education among the tribals in his constituency. He represented Dumri Assembly constituency in 1980, 1985 and 1995. Mahto was one of the founder member of Jharkhand Mukti Morcha political party.

== Biography ==
Shiva Mahto was born on the auspicious day of Mahashivratri in 1914, in Bokaro district's Sijua neighborhood near Dugda. Mahto was involved in social service in later part of his life and he primarily worked in the field of education for the poor children of tribal communities. He used to wander from village to village, in order to motivate the poor children to pursue education. He also coined the slogan of Padho aur Lado. In 1962, he joined Binod Bihari Mahato, the prominent leader associated with movement for a separate state of Jharkhand, which was demanded for the tribals of undivided Bihar. He soon became one of the pillar of Jharkhand movement, alongside other leaders such as Binod Bihari Mahto, Shibu Soren and A. K. Roy. Mahto also played significant role in freeing tribals from the clutches of unorganised debt market operated by moneylenders, which ultimately converted a tribal family into bonded labour.

His first stint in politics came in 1970s, when he contested in an election for the post of Mukhiya from the jail itself and won it comfortably. After that he was elected as a member of Bihar Legislative Assembly for three terms from Dumri Assembly constituency. Mahto was also known for his fight against the coal mafias of Jharkhand's collieries. He was known for his powerful speeches and traditional attire having green turban on his head. Mahto also led establishment of Jharkhand Commerce College in Gutbali, in his bid to improve the educational outcome in the tribal dominated state.
