= Sunil Kumar Mahato =

Indian politician

Sunil Mahato
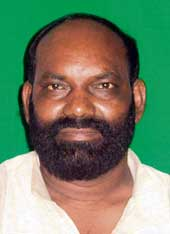

Member of Parliament
- In office 22 May 2004 – 04 March 2007
- Preceded by: Abha Mahato
- Succeeded by: Suman Mahato
- Constituency: Jamshedpur

Personal details
- Born: 11 January 1966 Vill Chota Gamharia, Seraikela Kharsawan,
- Died: 4 March 2007 (aged 41) Baghuria Village, Ghatshila, Jamshedpur
- Cause of death: Assassination by gunshot
- Party: JMM
- Spouse: Suman Mahato
- Children: 2
- As of 28 May, 2017

Sunil Kumar (11 January 1966 – 4 March 2007) was an Indian politician. He served as a member of parliament, the 14th Lok Sabha of India, representing the constituency of Jamshedpur in the eastern state of Jharkhand in 2004 until his assassination by Naxalite rebels who subscribe to Communist ideology. He was General Secretary of the Jharkhand Mukti Morcha (JMM) political party.

== Early life ==
Mahato came from a Kudmi family. In 2003, he was part of a delegation that met with the Governor of Jharkhand to request recognition as a scheduled tribe.

== Political career ==
Mahato was General Secretary of the Jharkhand Mukti Morcha party. He was elected to Lok Sabha in the 2004 general election; Abha Mahato of the BJP came in second.

== Death ==
On 4 March 2007, Mahato was shot dead by Communist rebels near Ghatshila in East Singhbhum district while he was attending a local football match organised to mark the Hindu festival of Holi. The attackers also killed the Ghatshila block secretary of JMM, Prabhakar Mahato, and two or four of Sunil Mahato's bodyguards. There were reported to be approximately 30 attackers, including three women.
