= Bablu Mahato =

Indian politician

Chandradeo Mahato
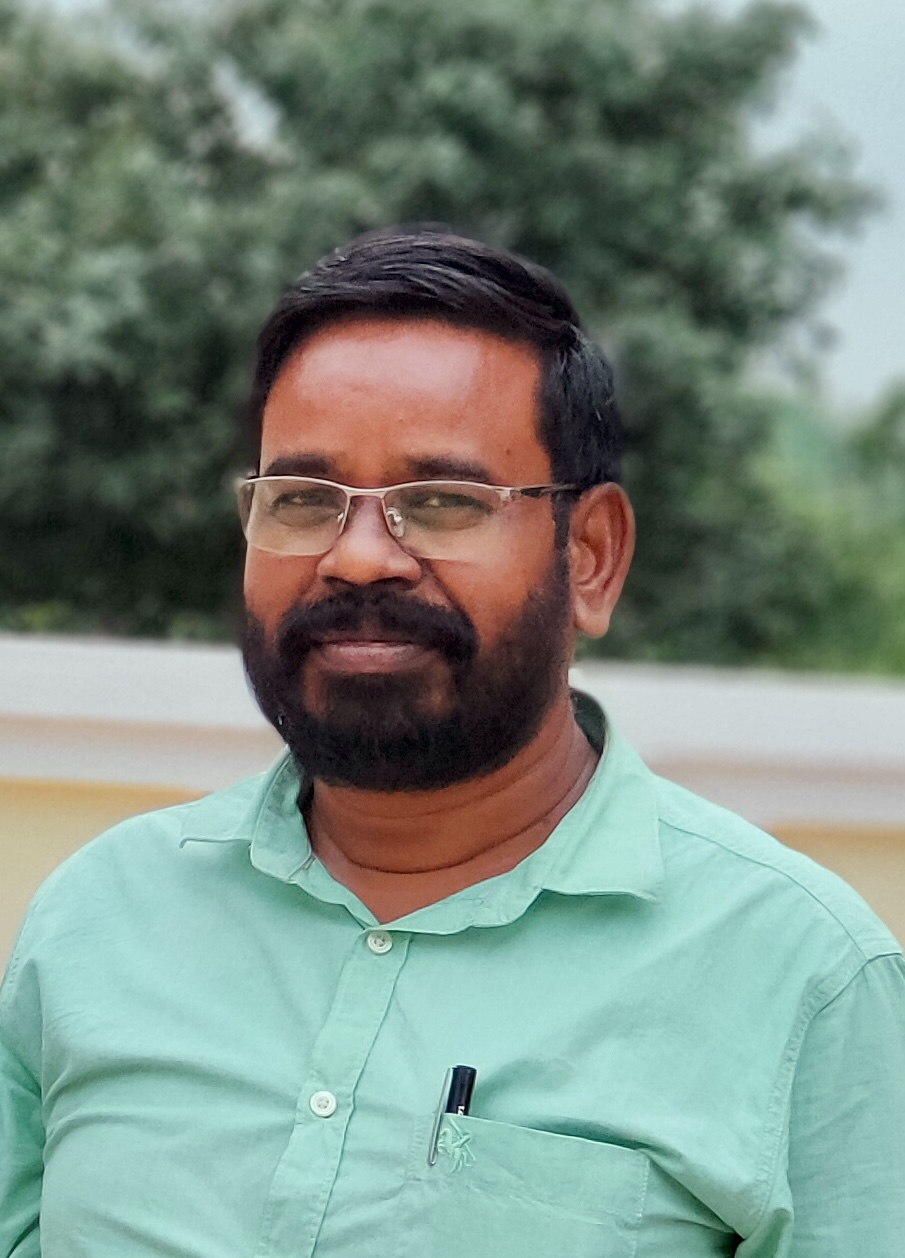
- Bablu Mahato
- Incumbent
- Assumed office 23 November 2024
- Preceded by: Indrajit Mahato
- Constituency: Sindri Assembly constituency

Personal details
- Party: Communist Party of India (Marxist–Leninist) Liberation
- Profession: Politician

Bablu Mahato, also known as Chandradeo Mahato, is an Indian politician and MLA from Sindri Assembly constituency in Jharkhand. He is the son of Anand Mahato, a four-time MLA from Sindri, previously associated with the Marxist Co-ordination Committee until its merger with CPI(ML) Liberation in 2024.

== Early life ==
Mahato worked as a school teacher before joining politics.

== Political career ==
Mahato contested the 38-Sindri seat in the 2024 Jharkhand Legislative Assembly election as a candidate of Communist Party of India (Marxist–Leninist) Liberation.

His campaign was supported by an alliance comprising Jharkhand Mukti Morcha (JMM), Indian National Congress, and CPI(ML) Liberation.

He won the election with a margin of 3,448 votes, defeating Tara Devi of the Bharatiya Janata Party (BJP).
