= Baby Devi =

Indian politician

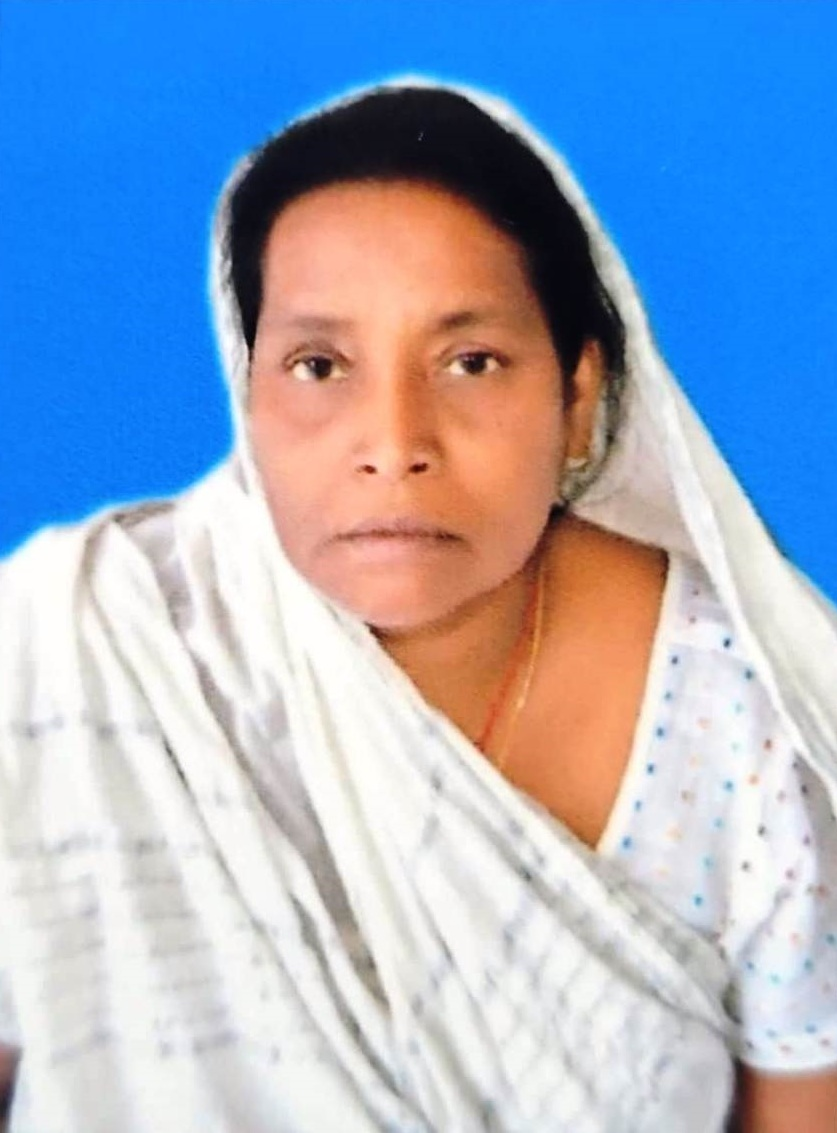

Minister of Government of Jharkhand
- In office 4 July 2023 – 25 November 2024
- Portfolio: Prohibition and Excise
- Chief Minister: Hemant Soren
- Ministry: Soren II
- Constituency: Dumri

Member of the Jharkhand Legislative Assembly
- In office 2023–2024
- Preceded by: Jagarnath Mahto
- Succeeded by: Jairam Kumar Mahato
- Constituency: Dumri

Personal details
- Spouse: Jagarnath Mahto
- Children: 5

Baby Devi also known as Baby Mahto is an Indian politician, served as a Minister of Prohibition and Excise in Second Hemant Soren Ministry . She is a Member of the Jharkhand Mukti Morcha. She is wife of Former Minister Jagarnath Mahto.

== Career ==
In the by-election conducted in the Dumri Assembly constituency in 2023, she defeated Yashoda Devi, a representative of the All Jharkhand Students' Union of National Democratic Alliance with over 17,000 votes to become member of the Jharkhand Legislative Assembly.

== Personal life ==
Baby Devi was married to Jagarnath Mahto.
