= Indrajit Mahato =

Indian politician

Indrajit Mahato (born 1972) is an Indian politician from Jharkhand who is an MLA from Sindri Assembly constituency in Dhanbad district. He won the 2019 Jharkhand Legislative Assembly election, representing the Bharatiya Janata Party.

== Early life and education ==
Mahato is from Sindri, Dhanbad district, Jharkhand. He is the son of late Surendra Nath Mahato. He completed his graduation in arts in 2012 at a college affiliated with C.M.J. University, Meghalaya.

== Career ==
Mahato won from Sindri Assembly constituency representing the Bharatiya Janata Party in the 2019 Jharkhand Legislative Assembly election. He polled 80,967 votes and defeated his nearest rival, Anand Mahato of the Marxist Co-ordination Committee Party, by a margin of 8,253 votes.
