= Jagarnath Mahto =

Indian politician (1967–2023)

Minister of School Education and Literacy Development of Jharkhand
- In office 2020 – 6 April 2023
- Governor: Droupadi Murmu; Ramesh Bais; C.P. Radhakrishnan

Minister of Prohibition and Excise of Jharkhand
- In office 2020 – 6 April 2023
- Governor: Droupadi Murmu; Ramesh Bais; C.P. Radhakrishnan

Member of the Jharkhand Legislative Assembly
- In office 2005 – 6 April 2023
- Constituency: Dumri

Personal details
- Born: 1 January 1967 Alargo, Bokaro, Jharkhand, India
- Died: 6 April 2023 (aged 56) Chennai, Tamil Nadu, India
- Children: 5

Jagannath Mahto (1 January 1967 – 6 April 2023) popularly known as "Tiger Mahto" or "Tiger Jagarnath Da" was an Indian politician and cabinet minister from Jharkhand.

== Political career ==
Mahto represented the Dumri Vidhan Sabha constituency as a Jharkhand Mukti Morcha MLA. Dumri Assembly seat has been a stronghold of JMM with Jagarnath Mahto representing its seat since 2000.

In the 2019 Assembly elections, he received 71,128 votes, defeating his closest opponent Yashoda Devi, who contested on a AJSU ticket.

Mahto tested positive for COVID-19 in 2020. He was taken to Chennai for treatment where remained in a coma for a long time. He underwent a lung transplant, before returning to the state after long nine months of continuous treatment.

Later, Mahto was airlifted to Chennai again after he reported uneasiness during the state budget session last month.

== Death ==
On 6 April 2023 after suffering from multiple organ failure, he died at MGM Healthcare from post COVID-19 complications.

== Personal life ==
Mahto was married to Bebi Devi.
