= Raghunath Mahato =

Indian freedom fighter

Saheed Raghunath Singh Mahato
- Born: 21 March 1738; Ghutiadih, Nimdih block, Saraikela-Kharsawan, British India (Now Jharkhand)
- Died: 5 April 1778 (aged 40); Silli, Jharkhand
- Movement: Chuar Rebellion
- Opponent: East India Company

Raghunath Singh Mahato (1738–1778) was a Kurmi leader in the Chuar Revolt (1785—1800) against British rule, leading his community, while Gopal Majhi led the Kurmi people in the Manbhum region.

== Overview ==
Raghunath Mahato was born on 21 March 1738 in Ghutiadih (Butparsa Ghutiadih) village of Nimdih block of Seraikela Kharsawan district.

The Rebellion against British was known as Chuar Rebellion. Chuar means looter. When British started to collect taxes in 1765 when they won Battle of Buxar and got rights to collect taxes from Bihar and Bengal. But people opposed it as People thought British were depriving their rights. Some zamindars joined British while other rebelled against them. His slogan was:

... "Apan Gaon, Apan Raij; Dhur Kheda British Raij".

On 5 April 1778, Raghunath Mahato and his team who were planning to snatch weapons from British forces in the forest. In this skirmish Raghunath Mahato and several other rebels died fighting British forces.
