= Anand Mahato =

Indian politician

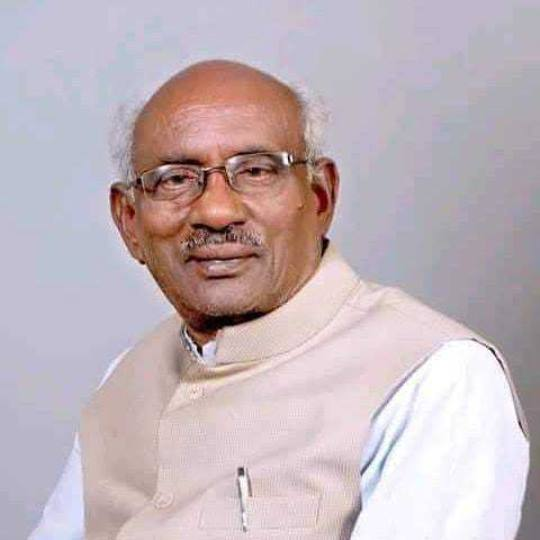

Member of Legislative Assembly (MLA)
- In office 1977–2000
- Constituency: Sindri

Personal details
- Born: January 23, 1942 (age 84) Sindri, Dhanbad district, Jharkhand, India
- Party: Marxist Coordination Committee (before 2024), CPI(ML) Liberation (after 2024)
- Children: Bablu Mahato
- Profession: Politician, social worker

Anand Mahato (born January 23, 1942) was an Indian politician and social worker who served four terms as a Member of the Legislative Assembly (MLA) from the Sindri Assembly constituency in Dhanbad, Jharkhand. An advocate for workers' rights and social justice, Mahato was a key figure in the Marxist Coordination Committee (MCC) until its merger with CPI(ML) Liberation in 2024.

== Political career ==
Anand Mahato's political career was deeply intertwined with the struggles of the working class in Jharkhand. He was one of the founding members of the Marxist Coordination Committee (MCC) and played a crucial role in its efforts to advance leftist ideologies in the region.

== See also ==
- Marxist Coordination Committee
- CPI(ML) Liberation
- Bablu Mahato
- Sindri (Vidhan Sabha constituency)
