= Abha Mahato =

Indian politician

Member of parliament
- Preceded by: Nitish Bharadwaj
- Succeeded by: Suman Mahato
- Constituency: Jamshedpur

Personal details
- Born: 27 October 1964 (age 61) Deoghar, Jharkhand, India
- Party: Bharatiya Janata Party (up to 26 February 2019) Indian National Congress (since 27 February 2019)
- Spouse: Shailendra Mahato (m. 1988)
- Children: Two

Abha Mahato (born 27 October 1964) is an Indian parliamentarian from Jamshedpur, Jharkhand.

== Personal life ==
Mahato was born in Deoghar (then in Bihar state) in 1964. She studied at Deoghar College (Bhagalpur University) from where she graduated with B.A. (Hons.) in Political Science.

She married Shri Shailendra Mahato, a former member of Lok Sabha on 27 June 1989 and 1991 of Jamshedpur. They have two sons.

== Political career ==
Mahato was elected to the 12th and 13th Lok Sabha from Jamshedpur as a member of Bharatiya Janata Party. She has been a member of various Parliamentary committees on commerce, coal, textiles, women's empowerment and on laws relating to women. She left Bharatiya Janata Party and joined Indian National Congress on 27 February 2019.
