= Suman Mahato =

Indian politician

Member of Lok Sabha
- In office 2007 - 2009
- Preceded by: Sunil Mahato
- Succeeded by: Arjun Munda
- Constituency: Jamshedpur

Personal details
- Born: 4 December 1964 Jamshedpur, East Singhbhum,
- Party: Jharkhand Mukti Morcha
- Spouse: Sunil Kumar Mahato (died in 2007)
- Children: 1 daughter
- As of 17 February, 2012

Suman Mahato (born 4 December 1964) was a member of the 14th Lok Sabha of India. A member of the Jharkhand Mukti Morcha (JMM) political party, she represented the constituency of Jamshedpur in the eastern state of Jharkhand.

She became MP in the by-elections after her husband and sitting MP Sunil Kumar Mahato was assassinated by suspected Maoist rebels near Ghatsila in East Singhbhum district on 4 March 2007 while he was attending a local football match organised to mark the Hindu festival of Holi. She served in parliament from 2007 to 2009.
