= Political families of Jharkhand =

Political families in Indian state

This is the alphabetical categorized list of statewide, regional, and local political families involved in the politics and various elections of Jharkhand, both at the state level (Jharkhand Legislative Assembly) and national level (Lok Sabha). The Soren family has produced two Chief Ministers, and its members have largely led the Jharkhand Mukti Morcha (JMM) since 1972. The Bharatiya Janata Party (BJP), Indian National Congress (INC), and All Jharkhand Students Union (AJSU) also have several dynastic leaders.

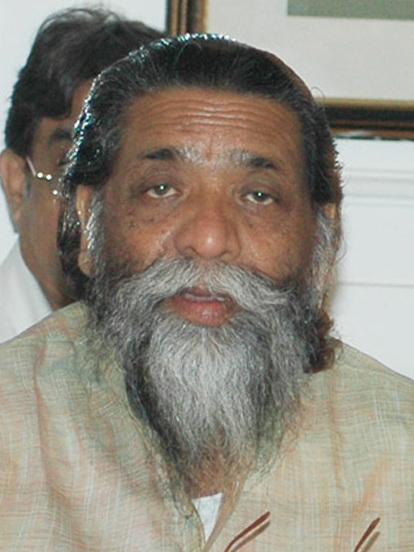
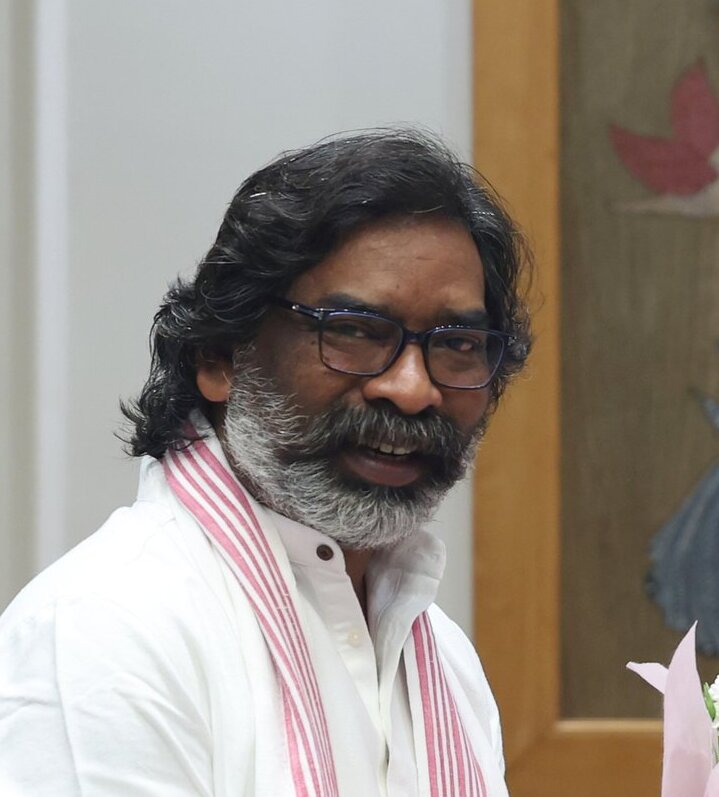
Left to right: Shibu Soren (Third Chief Minister) and Hemant Soren (Fifth Chief Minister)

== Soren family ==
The Soren family is one of the most influential political families in Jharkhand, with a strong legacy in the state's politics, particularly through the Jharkhand Mukti Morcha (JMM). The family has played a crucial role in the state's tribal and regional political movements.

Shibu Soren, the patriarch of the family, was a veteran politician and the founder of JMM. He had served as the Chief Minister of Jharkhand three times and had also been a Union Minister in the Central Government. He had been a key figure in the movement for the creation of Jharkhand as a separate state. His son, Hemant Soren, has carried forward his political legacy and has served multiple terms as the Chief Minister of Jharkhand. Under his leadership, JMM has remained a dominant force in the state's politics.

=== Members of the Soren family ===
- Shibu Soren – Former Chief Minister of Jharkhand and former Member of Parliament, Rajya Sabha.
  - Durga Soren – Former member of Jharkhand Legislative Assembly. (son of Shibu Soren)
    - Sita Soren – Former member of Jharkhand Legislative Assembly. (wife of Durga Soren)
  - Hemant Soren – Current Chief Minister of Jharkhand. (son of Shibu Soren)
    - Kalpana Soren – Current member of Jharkhand Legislative Assembly. (wife of Hemant Soren)
  - Basant Soren – Current member of Jharkhand Legislative Assembly. (son of Shibu Soren)

== Nagvanshi family ==
- Lal Pingley Nath Shahdeo – Jurist and political activist.
- Lal Chintamani Sharan Nath Shahdeo – Former Member of Bihar Legislative Assembly.
  - Gopal Sharan Nath Shahdeo – Former Member of Jharkhand Legislative Assembly. (son of Lal Chintamani Sharan Nath Shahdeo)
- Lal Ranvijay Nath Shahdeo – Lawyer and political activist.

== Ramgarh Raj family ==
- Shashank Manjari – Former Member of Parliament, Lok Sabha and former Member of Bihar Legislative Assembly. (wife of Maharaja Lakshmi Narain Singh)
  - Kamakhya Narain Singh – Former Member of Bihar Legislative Assembly. (son of Maharaja Lakshmi Narain Singh and Maharani Shashank Manjari Devi)
    - Rani Lalita Rajya Laxmi – Former Member of Parliament, Lok Sabha and former Member of Bihar Legislative Assembly. (wife of Kamakhya Narain Singh)
      - Indra Jitendra Narain Singh – Former Member of Bihar Legislative Assembly. (son of Kamakhya Narain Singh and Lalita Rajya Laxmi)
        - Saurabh Narain Singh – Former Member of Jharkhand Legislative Assembly. (grandson of Kamakhya Narain Singh and Lalita Rajya Laxmi, son of Indra Jitendra Narain Singh)
  - Basant Narain Singh – Former Member of Parliament, Lok Sabha and former Member of Bihar Legislative Assembly. (son of Maharaja Lakshmi Narain Singh and Maharani Shashank Manjari Devi, younger brother of Kamakhya Narain Singh)
    - Vijaya Raje – Former Member of Parliament, Lok Sabha and former Member of Bihar Legislative Assembly. (wife of Basant Narain Singh)
      - Rajkumar Udaybhan Narain Singh – Former Member of Parliament, Lok Sabha and former Member of Jharkhand Legislative Assembly. (grandson of Basant Narain Singh and Vijaya Raje)

== Other Families ==
=== Alam family ===
- Alamgir Alam – Former Member of Jharkhand Legislative Assembly.
  - Nisat Alam – Current Member of Jharkhand Legislative Assembly. (wife of Alamgir Alam)

=== Ansari family ===
- Furqan Ansari – Former Member of Parliament, Lok Sabha and former Member of Bihar and Jharkhand Legislative Assembly.
  - Irfan Ansari – Current Member of Jharkhand Legislative Assembly. (son of Furqan Ansari)

=== Haji Hussain Ansari family ===
- Haji Hussain Ansari – Former Member of Jharkhand Legislative Assembly.
  - Hafizul Hasan – Current Member of Jharkhand Legislative Assembly. (son of Haji Hussain Ansari)

=== Bhogta family ===
- Mahendra Prakash Singh Bhogta – Former Member of Bihar Legislative Assembly.
  - Jay Prakash Singh Bhogta – Former Member of Jharkhand Legislative Assembly. (son of Mahendra Prakash Singh Bhogta)

=== Chatterjee family ===
- Gurudas Chatterjee – Former Member of Bihar Legislative Assembly.
  - Arup Chatterjee – Current Member of Jharkhand Legislative Assembly. (son of Gurudas Chatterjee)

=== Choudhary family ===
- Chandra Prakash Choudhary – Current Member of Parliament.
  - Sunita Choudhary – Former Member of Jharkhand Legislative Assembly. (wife of Chandra Prakash Choudhary)
- Roshan Lal Choudhary – Current Member of Jharkhand Legislative Assembly. (brother of Chandra Prakash Choudhary)

=== Raghubar Das family ===
- Raghubar Das – Former Governor of Odisha and former Chief Minister of Jharkhand.
  - Purnima Sahu – Current Member of Jharkhand Legislative Assembly. (daughter-in-law of Raghubar Das)

=== Upendra Das family ===
- Upendra Nath Das – Former Member of Jharkhand Legislative Assembly.
  - Kumar Ujjwal Das – Current Member of Jharkhand Legislative Assembly.

=== Nagar Untari Estate family ===
- Shankar Pratap Deo – Former Member of Bihar Legislative Assembly.
  - Raj Rajendra Pratap Deo – Former Member of Bihar Legislative Assembly. (son of Shankar Pratap Deo)
    - Anant Pratap Deo – Former Member of Jharkhand Legislative Assembly. (grandson of Shankar Pratap Deo, son of Raj Rajendra Pratap Deo)

=== Hansda family ===
- Thomas Hansda – Former Member of Parliament, Lok Sabha.
  - Vijay Kumar Hansdak – Current Member of Parliament, Lok Sabha. (son of Thomas Hansda)

=== Koda family ===
- Madhu Koda – Former Member of Parliament, Lok Sabha and former Chief Minister of Jharkhand.
  - Geeta Koda – Former Member of Parliament, Lok Sabha. (wife of Madhu Koda)

=== Anand Mahato family ===
- Anand Mahato – Former Member of Bihar Legislative Assembly.
  - Bablu Mahato – Current Member of Jharkhand Legislative Assembly. (son of Anand Mahato)

=== B.B. Mahato family ===
- Binod Bihari Mahato – Former Member of Parliament, Lok Sabha and former Member of Bihar Legislative Assembly.
  - Raj Kishore Mahato – Former Member of Parliament, Lok Sabha and former Member of Jharkhand Legislative Assembly. (son of Binod Bihari Mahato)

=== Dulu Mahato family ===
- Dulu Mahato – Current Member of Parliament and former Member of Jharkhand Legislative Assembly.
- Shatrughan Mahato – Current Member of Jharkhand Legislative Assembly. (brother of Dulu Mahato)

=== Nirmal Mahato family ===
- Nirmal Mahato – Political activist, founder of All Jharkhand Students Union.
- Sudhir Mahato – Former Deputy Chief Minister of Jharkhand. (brother of Nirmal Mahato)
  - Sabita Mahato – Current Member of Jharkhand Legislative Assembly. (wife of Sudhir Mahato)

=== Shailendra Mahato family ===
- Shailendra Mahato – Former Member of Parliament, Lok Sabha.
  - Abha Mahato – Former Member of Parliament, Lok Sabha (wife of Shailendra Mahato)

=== Sunil Mahato family ===
- Sunil Kumar Mahato – Former Member of Parliament, Lok Sabha.
  - Suman Mahato – Former Member of Parliament, Lok Sabha. (wife of Sunil Kumar Mahato)

=== Jagarnath Mahto family ===
- Jagarnath Mahto – Former Member of Jharkhand Legislative Assembly.
  - Baby Devi – Former Member of Jharkhand Legislative Assembly. (wife of Jagarnath Mahto)

=== Tek Lal Mahto family ===
- Tek Lal Mahto – Former Member of Parliament, Lok Sabha and former Member of Jharkhand Legislative Assembly.
  - Jai Prakash Bhai Patel – Former Member of Jharkhand Legislative Assembly. (son of Tek Lal Mahto)

=== Majhi family ===
- Devendra Majhi – Political leader and former Member of Bihar Legislative Assembly.
  - Joba Majhi – Current Member of Parliament, Lok Sabha and former Member of Jharkhand Legislative Assembly. (wife of Devendra Majhi)
    - Jagat Majhi – Current Member of Jharkhand Legislative Assembly. (son of Devendra Majhi and Joba Majhi)

=== Mandal family ===
- Sumrit Mandal – Former Member of Bihar Legislative Assembly
  - Raghu Nandan Mandal – Former Member of Jharkhand Legislative Assembly. (son of Sumrit Mandal)
    - Amit Kumar Mandal – Current Member of Jharkhand Legislative Assembly. (son of Raghu Nandan Mandal)

=== Marandi family ===
- Simon Marandi – Former Member of Parliament, Lok Sabha and former Member of Jharkhand Legislative Assembly.
  - Sushila Hansdak – Former Member of Bihar and Jharkhand Legislative Assembly. (wife of Simon Marandi)
    - Dinesh William Marandi – Former Member of Jharkhand Legislative Assembly. (son of Simon Marandi and Sushila Hansdak)

=== Ramesh Singh Munda family ===
- Ramesh Singh Munda – Former Member of Jharkhand Legislative Assembly.
  - Vikash Kumar Munda – Current Member of Jharkhand Legislative Assembly. (son of Ramesh Singh Munda)

=== Prasad family ===
- Yogendra Prasad – Former Member of Jharkhand Legislative Assembly.
  - Babita Devi – Former Member of Jharkhand Legislative Assembly. (wife of Yogendra Prasad)

=== Sao family ===
- Yogendra Sao – Former Member of Jharkhand Legislative Assembly.
  - Nirmala Devi – Former Member of Jharkhand Legislative Assembly. (wife of Yogendra Sao)
    - Amba Prasad – Former Member of Jharkhand Legislative Assembly. (daughter of Yogendra Sao and Nirmala Devi)

=== Sarangi family ===
- Dinesh Sarangi – Former Member of Jharkhand Legislative Assembly.
  - Kunal Sarangi – Former Member of Jharkhand Legislative Assembly. (son of Dinesh Sarangi)

=== Bidesh Singh family ===
- Bidesh Singh – Former Member of Jharkhand Legislative Assembly.
  - Devendra Kumar Singh – Former Member of Jharkhand Legislative Assembly. (son of Bidesh Singh)

=== Harihar Singh family ===
- Harihar Singh – Former Chief Minister of Bihar.
  - Amrendra Pratap Singh – Former Member of Bihar Legislative Assembly. (son of Harihar Singh)
  - Mrigendra Pratap Singh – Former Member of Bihar and Jharkhand Legislative Assembly. (son of Harihar Singh, brother of Amrendra Pratap Singh)

=== Mahendar Prasad Singh family ===
- Mahendar Prasad Singh – Former Member of Bihar and Jharkhand Legislative Assembly.
  - Vinod Kumar Singh – Former Member of Jharkhand Legislative Assembly. (son of Mahendar Prasad Singh)

=== Rajendra Prasad Singh family ===
- Rajendra Prasad Singh – Former Member of Bihar and Jharkhand Legislative Assembly.
  - Kumar Jaimangal (Anup Singh) – Current Member of Jharkhand Legislative Assembly. (son of Rajendra Prasad Singh)

=== Suryadeo Singh family ===
- Suryadeo Singh – Former Member of Bihar Legislative Assembly and mafia leader.
  - Kunti Singh – Former Member of Jharkhand Legislative Assembly. (wife of Suryadeo Singh)
    - Sanjeev Singh – Former Member of Jharkhand Legislative Assembly. (son of Suryadeo Singh and Kunti Singh)
      - Ragini Singh – Current Member of Jharkhand Legislative Assembly. (wife of Sanjeev Singh)
- Bachcha Singh – Former Member of Jharkhand Legislative Assembly. (brother of Suryadeo Singh and Rajan Singh)
- Rajan Singh – Political leader (brother of Suryadeo Singh and Bachcha Singh)
  - Niraj Singh – Former Deputy Mayor. (son of Rajan Singh)
    - Purnima Niraj Singh – Former Member of Jharkhand Legislative Assembly. (wife of Niraj Singh)

=== Sinha family ===
- Yashwant Sinha – Former Member of Parliament, Lok Sabha
  - Jayant Sinha – Former Member of Parliament, Lok Sabha (son of Yashwant Sinha)

=== Nalin Soren family ===
- Nalin Soren – Current Member of Parliament, Lok Sabha.
  - Alok Kumar Soren – Current Member of Jharkhand Legislative Assembly. (son of Nalin Soren)

=== Ramdas Soren family ===
- Ramdas Soren – Former Member of Jharkhand Legislative Assembly.
  - Somesh Chandra Soren – Current Member of Jharkhand Legislative Assembly. (son of Ramdas Soren)

=== Ichagarh State family ===
- Shatrughan Aditya Deo – Former Member of Bihar Legislative Assembly.
  - Prabhat Kumar Aditya Deo – Former Member of Bihar Legislative Assembly. (son of Shatrughan Aditya Deo)

=== Seraikela State family ===
- Aditya Pratap Singh Deo – Former Member of Bihar Legislative Assembly.
  - Nrupendra Narayan Singh Deo – Former Member of Bihar Legislative Assembly. (son of Aditya Pratap Singh Deo, brother of Rajendra Narayan Singh Deo)
    - Shatbhanu Singh Deo – Former Member of Bihar Legislative Assembly.
  - Rajendra Narayan Singh Deo – Former Chief Minister of Odisha. (son of Aditya Pratap Singh Deo, adopted-son of Maharaja Prithwiraj Singh Deo of Patna state, brother of Nrupendra Narayan Singh Deo)
    - See: Political families of Odisha
  - Ratnaprava Devi – Former Member of Orissa Legislative Assembly. (daughter of Aditya Pratap Singh Deo, sister of Nrupendra Narayan Singh Deo and Rajendra Narayan Singh Deo)

=== Tirkey family ===
- Bandhu Tirkey – Former member of Jharkhand Legislative Assembly.
  - Shilpi Neha Tirkey – Current member of Jharkhand Legislative Assembly. (daughter of Bandhu Tirkey)

=== Verma family ===
- Rati Lal Prasad Verma, six time Member of Indian Parliament (Lok Sabha) from Kodarma Lok Sabha constituency in Jharkhand.
- Jagdish Prasad Kushwaha, considered as founding leader of Bharatiya Jana Sangh in Jharkhand. (brother of Rati Lal Prasad Verma)
  - Jai Prakash Verma, Former Member of Jharkhand Legislative Assembly from Gandey Assembly constituency. (son of Jagdish Prasad Kushwaha and nephew of Rati Lal Prasad Verma)

=== Chitranjan Yadav family ===
- Chitranjan Yadav – Former Member of Jharkhand Legislative Assembly.
  - Amit Kumar Yadav – Current Member of Jharkhand Legislative Assembly. (son of Chitranjan Yadav)
- Janki Prasad Yadav – Former Member of Jharkhand Legislative Assembly (brother of Chitranjan Yadav)

=== Ramesh Prasad Yadav family ===
- Ramesh Prasad Yadav – Former Member of Parliament, Lok Sabha.
  - Annpurna Devi – Current Member of Parliament, Lok Sabha and former Member of Jharkhand Legislative Assembly. (wife of Ramesh Prasad Yadav)

== See also ==
- Political families in India
- Political parties in Jharkhand
