= Political parties in Jharkhand =

A number of political parties operate in the Indian state of Jharkhand. Some of them are organised nationally, and others within the region.

== Major national parties ==
No.	Symbol	Party	Leader	Strength (in recent elections)			Ref.
No.	Symbol	Party	Leader	Vidhan Sabha	Lok Sabha	Rajya Sabha	Ref.
1		Bharatiya Janata Party (BJP)	Babulal Marandi	21 / 81	8 / 14	3 / 6	
2		Indian National Congress (INC)	Keshav Mahto Kamlesh	16 / 81	2 / 14	0 / 6	

== Minor national-level parties ==
No.	Symbol	Party	Leader	Strength (in recent elections)			Ref.
No.	Symbol	Party	Leader	Vidhan Sabha	Lok Sabha	Rajya Sabha	Ref.
1		Communist Party of India (Marxist) (CPIM)	Prakash Viplab	0 / 81	0 / 14	0 / 6	
2		Bahujan Samaj Party (BSP)	Mayawati	0 / 81	0 / 14	0 / 6	
3		Aam Aadmi Party (AAP)	Dr. Ajay Kumar Singh	0 / 81	0 / 14	0 / 6	

== Regional parties ==
No.	Symbol	Party	Leader	Strength (in recent elections)			Ref.
No.	Symbol	Party	Leader	Vidhan Sabha	Lok Sabha	Rajya Sabha	Ref.
1		Jharkhand Mukti Morcha (JMM)	Hemant Soren	34 / 81	3 / 14	2 / 6	
2		Rashtriya Janata Dal (RJD)	Abhay Kumar Singh	4 / 81	0 / 14	0 / 6	
3		Communist Party of India (Marxist-Leninist) Liberation (CPIMLL)	Manoj Bhakt	2 / 81	0 / 14	0 / 6	
4		All Jharkhand Students Union (AJSU)	Sudesh Mahto	1 / 81	1 / 14	0 / 6	
5		Jharkhand Loktantrik Krantikari Morcha (JLKM)	Jairam Kumar Mahato	1 / 81	0 / 14	0 / 6	
6		Janata Dal (United) (JDU)	Khiru Mahto	1 / 81	0 / 14	0 / 6	
7		Lok Janshakti Party (Ram Vilas)	Birendra Prasad Pradhan	1 / 81	0 / 14	0 / 6	
8		All India Trinamool Congress (AITMC)	Kameshwar Baitha	0 / 81	0 / 14	0 / 6	
9		Nationalist Congress Party (Sharadchandra Pawar) (NCP (SP))		0 / 81	0 / 14	0 / 6	
10		Communist Party of India (CPI)	Mahendra Pathak	0 / 81	0 / 14	0 / 6	
11		Jharkhand People's Party (JPP)	Surya Singh Besra	0 / 81	0 / 14	0 / 6	
12		Jharkhand Party	Ajit Kumar	0 / 81	0 / 14	0 / 6	
13		Jharkhand Party (Anosh Ekka)	Anosh Ekka	0 / 81	0 / 14	0 / 6	
14		Jharkhand Party (Horo)	Late Niral Enem Horo	0 / 81	0 / 14	0 / 6	
15		Jharkhand Party (Naren)	Naren	0 / 81	0 / 14	0 / 6	
16		United Jharkhand Party (UJP)	Late Justin Richard	0 / 81	0 / 14	0 / 6	
17		All India Jharkhand Party (AIJP)		0 / 81	0 / 14	0 / 6	
18		Hul Jharkhand Party (HJP)	Late Justin Richard	0 / 81	0 / 14	0 / 6	
19		Birsa Seva Dal (BSD)	Lalit Kuzur	0 / 81	0 / 14	0 / 6	
20		All India Majlis-e-Ittehadul Muslimeen (AIMIM)		0 / 81	0 / 14	0 / 6	
21		All India Forward Bloc (AIFB)	Arun Mondal	0 / 81	0 / 14	0 / 6	
22		Socialist Unity Centre of India (Communist) (SUCI(C))	Robin Samajpati	0 / 81	0 / 14	0 / 6	
23		Bahujan Mukti Party (BMP)		0 / 81	0 / 14	0 / 6	
24		Aam Awam Morcha (AAM)	Ram Naresh Yadav	0 / 81	0 / 14	0 / 6	
25		Rashtriya Jankranti Morcha (RJM)		0 / 81	0 / 14	0 / 6	
26		Jharkhand Mukti Morcha - Ulgulan (JMM-U)	Krishna Mardi	0 / 81	0 / 14	0 / 6	
27		Jharkhand Jan Kranti Morcha (JJKM)	Amrendra Kumar (Munni)	0 / 81	0 / 14	0 / 6	
28		Progressive Hul Jharkhand Party (PHJP)		0 / 81	0 / 14	0 / 6	
29		Rajya Hul Jharkhand Party (RHJP)		0 / 81	0 / 14	0 / 6	
30		Rashtriya Sengel Party (RSP)		0 / 81	0 / 14	0 / 6	
31		Azad Samaj Party (Kanshi Ram) (ASP-KR)		0 / 81	0 / 14	0 / 6	
32		Samajwadi Party (SP)		0 / 81	0 / 14	0 / 6	
33		Bharat Adivasi Party (BAP)	Prem Shankar Shahi Munda	0 / 81	0 / 14	0 / 6	
34		Sampoorna Bharat Kranti Party (SBKP)		0 / 81	0 / 14	0 / 6	
35		Adivasi-Moolvasi Janadhikar Manch (AMJM)		0 / 81	0 / 14	0 / 6	
36		Ambedkar National Congress (ANC)		0 / 81	0 / 14	0 / 6	
37		Rashtriya Samanta Dal (RSD)		0 / 81	0 / 14	0 / 6	
38		Samata Party (SP)	Uday Mandal	0 / 81	0 / 14	0 / 6	
39		Rashtriya Lok Dal (RLD)		0 / 81	0 / 14	0 / 6	
40		Right to Recall Party (RTRP)		0 / 81	0 / 14	0 / 6	
41		Ambedkarite Party of India (API)		0 / 81	0 / 14	0 / 6	
42		Peoples Party of India (Democratic) (PPID)		0 / 81	0 / 14	0 / 6	
43		Lokhit Adhikar Party		0 / 81	0 / 14	0 / 6	
44		Azad Adhikar Sena (AAS)		0 / 81	0 / 14	0 / 6	
45		Bhartiya Azad Sena (BAS)		0 / 81	0 / 14	0 / 6	
46		Hindustani Awam Manch (United) (HAM-U)		0 / 81	0 / 14	0 / 6	
47		Rashtriya Deshaj Party (RDP)		0 / 81	0 / 14	0 / 6	
48		Bhartiya Janjagran Gandhiwadi Party (BJGP)		0 / 81	0 / 14	0 / 6	
49		Indian National Socialistic Action Forces (INSAF)		0 / 81	0 / 14	0 / 6	
50		Rashtriya Jansangharsh Swaraj Party (RJSP)		0 / 81	0 / 14	0 / 6	
51		Republican Party of India (A)		0 / 81	0 / 14	0 / 6	
52		Swatantra Rashtravadi Party (SRP)		0 / 81	0 / 14	0 / 6	
53		Bhagidari Party(P)		0 / 81	0 / 14	0 / 6	
54		Rashtriya Suraksha Party (RSP)		0 / 81	0 / 14	0 / 6	
55		Rashtriya Jaihind Party (RJP)		0 / 81	0 / 14	0 / 6	
56		Mera Adhikaar Rashtriya Dal (MARD)		0 / 81	0 / 14	0 / 6	
57		Akhil Bharatiya Socialist Party		0 / 81	0 / 14	0 / 6	
58		Bharatiya Sarvjan Vikas Party (BSVP)		0 / 81	0 / 14	0 / 6	
59		Abua Jharkhand Party (AJP)		0 / 81	0 / 14	0 / 6	
60		Sadan Vikas Party (SVP)		0 / 81	0 / 14	0 / 6	
61		Akhil Bhartiya Aarakshit Samaj Party (ABASP)		0 / 81	0 / 14	0 / 6	
62		Aadarsh Sangram Party (ASP)		0 / 81	0 / 14	0 / 6	
63		Hindustan Peoples Party (Democratic)		0 / 81	0 / 14	0 / 6	
64		Rashtriya Republican Party (RRP)		0 / 81	0 / 14	0 / 6	
65		Akhil Bharatiya Jharkhand Party (ABJP)		0 / 81	0 / 14	0 / 6	
66		Lok Jan Vikas Morcha		0 / 81	0 / 14	0 / 6	
67		Gondvana Gantantra Party (GGP)		0 / 81	0 / 14	0 / 6	
68		Navyug Pragatisheel Morcha (NPM)		0 / 81	0 / 14	0 / 6	
69		Johaar Party (JP)		0 / 81	0 / 14	0 / 6	
70		Jagrook Janta Party (JJP)		0 / 81	0 / 14	0 / 6	
71		Swabhiman Party (SP)		0 / 81	0 / 14	0 / 6	
72		Jai Maha Bharath Party (JMBP)		0 / 81	0 / 14	0 / 6	
73		Aapki Vikas Party (AVP)		0 / 81	0 / 14	0 / 6	

== Defunct regional parties ==
No.	Party	Founder	Leader	Defunct Year	Reason
1	Marxist Co-ordination Committee (MCC)	A. K. Roy	Arup Chatterjee	2024	Merged into CPI(ML)L
2	Jharkhand Vikas Morcha (Prajatantrik) (JVM-P)	Babulal Marandi	Babulal Marandi	2020	Merged into BJP
3	Jai Bharat Samanta Party (JBSP)	Madhu Koda	Madhu Koda	2018	Merged into INC
4	Jharkhand Disom Party (JDP)	Salkhan Murmu	Salkhan Murmu	2014	Merged into BJP
5	Jharkhand Vananchal Congress (JVC)	Samresh Singh	Samresh Singh		Merged into BSP
6	Jharkhand Mukti Morcha (B) (JMM-B)	Binod Bihari Mahato	Binod Bihari Mahato		Merged into JMM
7	Jharkhand Vikas Dal (JVD)	Suraj Mandal	Suraj Mandal		Merged into BJP
8	Jharkhand Janadhikar Manch (JJM)	Bandhu Tirkey	Bandhu Tirkey		Merged into INC
9	United Goans Democratic Party (UGDP)	Anaclato Vigaus	Najm Ansari	2015	
10	Rastriya Kalyan Pakshya (RKP)	Chamra Linda	Chamra Linda		Merged into JMM
11	Jharkhand Mukti Morcha (Suraj Mandal) (JMM-SM)	Suraj Mandal	Suraj Mandal		Merged into JMM
12	Bihar Progressive Hul Jharkhand Party (BPHJP)	Shibu Soren	Shibu Soren		Merged into JMM

== See also ==
- Political parties in India
- Political families of Jharkhand
