= Mandu Assembly constituency =

Constituency of the Jharkhand legislative assembly in India

Coordinates: 23.80°N 85.47°E

Mandu
- Constituency No. 24 for the Jharkhand Legislative Assembly

Constituency details
- Country: India
- Region: East India
- State: Jharkhand
- District: Hazaribagh
- Lok Sabha constituency: Hazaribagh
- Established: 2000
- Total electors: 386,617
- Reservation: None

Member of Legislative Assembly
- 5th Jharkhand Legislative Assembly
- Incumbent Nirmal Mahto
- Party: AJSU
- Alliance: NDA
- Elected year: 2024

Mandu Assembly constituency is an assembly constituency in the Indian state of Jharkhand. Also one of the 81 assembly constituencies of Jharkhand, Mandu belongs to Hazaribagh parliamentary constituency.

== Members of Legislative Assembly ==
Election	Member	Party
Bihar Legislative Assembly
Before 1957: Constituency did not exist
1957	Moti Ram	Chota Nagpur Santhal Parganas Janata Party
1962	Raghunandan Prasad	Swatantra Party
1967	B. N. Singh	Jan Kranti Dal
1969	Kamakhya Narain Singh	Janata Party
1972	Birendra Kumar Pandey	Indian National Congress
1977	Gopal Sharan Singh	Janata Party
1980	Ramnika Gupta	Janata Party
1985	Tek Lal Mahto	Independent politician
1990	Tek Lal Mahto	Jharkhand Mukti Morcha
1995	Tek Lal Mahto	Jharkhand Mukti Morcha
2000	Tek Lal Mahto	Jharkhand Mukti Morcha
Jharkhand Legislative Assembly
2005	Khiru Mahto	Janata Dal (United)
2009	Tek Lal Mahto	Jharkhand Mukti Morcha
2011^	Jai Prakash Bhai Patel	Jharkhand Mukti Morcha
2014	Jai Prakash Bhai Patel	Jharkhand Mukti Morcha
2019	Jai Prakash Bhai Patel	Bharatiya Janata Party
2024	Nirmal Mahto	All Jharkhand Students Union

== Election results ==
=== Assembly election 2024 ===
2024 Jharkhand Legislative Assembly election: Mandu
Party	Candidate	Votes	%	±%
AJSU	Nirmal Mahto	90,871	31.85%	▲11.84
INC	Jai Prakash Bhai Patel	90,640	31.77%	New
JLKM	Bihari Kumar	71,276	24.98%	New
ASP(KR)	Mohammad Nazir Ansari	10,198	3.57%	New
Independent	Mahesh Tigga	4,752	1.67%	New
Independent	Ranjeet Kumar Soren	1,322	0.468%	New
Independent	Anand Soren	4,696	1.65%	New
Independent	Bipin Kumar Sinha	2,363	0.83%	New
Rashtriya Jankranti Morcha	Mahmood Alam	725	0.25%	New
NOTA	None of the Above	1,011	0.35%	▼0.32
Margin of victory		231	0.08%	▼0.78
Turnout		2,85,343	66.14%	▲4.34
Registered electors		4,31,452		▲11.60
AJSU gain from BJP		Swing	▲10.98	

=== Assembly election 2019 ===
2019 Jharkhand Legislative Assembly election: Mandu
Party	Candidate	Votes	%	±%
BJP	Jai Prakash Bhai Patel	49,855	20.87%	▼10.44
AJSU	Nirmal Mahto	47,793	20.01%	New
JMM	Ram Prakash Bhai Patel	44,768	18.74%	▼15.64
Independent	Kumar Mahesh Singh	28,866	12.08%	New
JVM(P)	Chandra Nath Bhai Patel	15,746	6.59%	▼4.19
AIMIM	Hamid Hashmi	13,972	5.85%	New
JD(U)	Dushyant Kumar Patel	6,641	2.78%	▼4.86
NOTA	None of the Above	1,607	0.67%	▲0.02
Margin of victory		2,062	0.86%	▼2.21
Turnout		2,38,894	61.79%	▼2.77
Registered electors		3,86,617		▲9.32
BJP gain from JMM		Swing	▼13.51	

=== Assembly election 2014 ===
2014 Jharkhand Legislative Assembly election: Mandu
Party	Candidate	Votes	%	±%
JMM	Jai Prakash Bhai Patel	78,499	34.38%	▲3.09
BJP	Kumar Mahesh Singh	71,487	31.31%	New
JVM(P)	Chandra Nath Bhai Patel	24,622	10.78%	New
JD(U)	Khiru Mahto	17,436	7.64%	▲1.31
CPI(ML)L	Pachu Rana	5,868	2.57%	▼11.22
IUML	Abdul Kaiyum	3,360	1.47%	New
Independent	Md. Salman Ansari	3,222	1.41%	New
NOTA	None of the Above	1,486	0.65%	New
Margin of victory		7,012	3.07%	▼11.12
Turnout		2,28,340	64.56%	▲8.46
Registered electors		3,53,669		▲18.45
JMM hold		Swing	▲3.09	

=== Assembly by-election 2011 ===
2011 Jharkhand Legislative Assembly by-election: Mandu
Party	Candidate	Votes	%	±%
JMM	J.P.B. Patel	52,404	31.29%	▲9.25
INC	K.M. Singh	28,636	17.10%	▼0.21
	M. Jaiswal	23,433	13.99%	New
CPI(ML)L	C.N.B. Patel	23,098	13.79%	▼1.55
JD(U)	Khiru Mahto	10,596	6.33%	▼4.50
Independent	Razi Ahmad	3,711	2.22%	New
RJD	B. Patel	3,521	2.10%	New
Margin of victory		23,768	14.19%	▲9.46
Turnout		1,67,504	56.10%	▼1.41
Registered electors		2,98,577		▲1.71
JMM hold		Swing	▲9.25	

=== Assembly election 2009 ===
2009 Jharkhand Legislative Assembly election: Mandu
Party	Candidate	Votes	%	±%
JMM	Tek Lal Mahto	37,198	22.03%	▲7.46
INC	Kumar Mahesh Singh	29,220	17.31%	New
CPI(ML)L	Chandra Nath Bhai Patel	25,902	15.34%	▲5.88
JD(U)	Khiru Mahto	18,281	10.83%	▼9.83
AJSU	Nirmal Mahto	14,463	8.57%	▼0.37
Independent	Arun Prasad	12,105	7.17%	New
Independent	Mahmood Alam	5,193	3.08%	New
Margin of victory		7,978	4.73%	▼1.36
Turnout		1,68,825	57.51%	▲2.18
Registered electors		2,93,563		▲0.60
JMM gain from JD(U)		Swing	▲1.38	

=== Assembly election 2005 ===
2005 Jharkhand Legislative Assembly election: Mandu
Party	Candidate	Votes	%	±%
JD(U)	Khiru Mahto	33,350	20.66%	New
JMM	Ram Prakash Bhai Patel	23,522	14.57%	▼25.46
CPI(ML)L	Parmeshwar Mahto	15,280	9.46%	▼1.92
AJSU	Razi Ahmad	14,426	8.94%	New
Marxist Co-Ordination	Mithilesh Kumar Singh	13,001	8.05%	▲3.63
CPI	Naresh Prasad	11,303	7.00%	New
Independent	Chandra Nath Bhai Patel	10,359	6.42%	New
Margin of victory		9,828	6.09%	▼18.05
Turnout		1,61,448	55.33%	▲4.60
Registered electors		2,91,800		▲20.86
JD(U) gain from JMM		Swing	▼19.37	

=== Assembly election 2000 ===
2000 Bihar Legislative Assembly election: Mandu
Party	Candidate	Votes	%	±%
JMM	Tek Lal Mahto	49,022	40.03%	New
SAP	Khiru Mahto	19,458	15.89%	New
INC	Kumar Mahesh Singh	18,317	14.96%	New
CPI(ML)L	Sohrai Manjhi	13,943	11.39%	New
RJD	Shamser Alam	10,780	8.80%	New
Marxist Co-Ordination	Deochand Mahto	5,413	4.42%	New
BJP	Ranjeet Kumar Sinha	3,179	2.60%	New
Margin of victory		29,564	24.14%	
Turnout		1,22,468	51.39%	
Registered electors		2,41,436		
JMM win (new seat)				

== See also ==
- Vidhan Sabha
- List of states of India by type of legislature
