= Kunti (disambiguation) =

Kunti is a female character in the ancient Indian epic Mahābhārata.

It may also refer to:

- Kunti Kingdom, in the epic
- Kunti-Bhoja, another character in the epic
- Kunti Singh, an Indian politician
- A name for the sculpture (Untitled) Blue Lady
