= Nirsa Assembly constituency =

Constituency of the Jharkhand legislative assembly in India

Coordinates: 23.787°N 86.704°E

Nirsa
- Constituency No. 39 for the Jharkhand Legislative Assembly

Constituency details
- Country: India
- Region: East India
- State: Jharkhand
- District: Dhanbad
- Lok Sabha constituency: Dhanbad
- Established: 2000
- Total electors: 309,439
- Reservation: None

Member of Legislative Assembly
- 6th Jharkhand Legislative Assembly
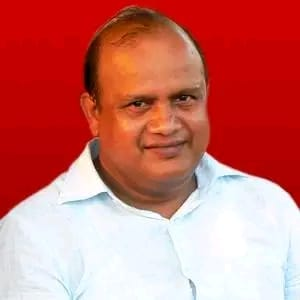
- Incumbent Arup Chatterjee
- Party: CPI(ML)L
- Alliance: MGB
- Elected year: 2024

Nirsa Assembly constituency is an assembly constituency in the Indian state of Jharkhand.

== Members of the Legislative Assembly ==
Election	Member	Party
Bihar Legislative Assembly
Before 1957: see Tundi cum Nirsa constituency
1957	Lakshmi Narain Manjhi	Indian National Congress
1957	Ram Narain Sharma	Indian National Congress
1962	Lakshmi Narain Manjhi	Indian National Congress
1967	Ram Narain Sharma	Indian National Congress
1969	Nirmalendu Bhattacharya	Communist Party of India
1972	Nirmalendu Bhattacharya	Communist Party of India
1977	Kripa Shankar Chatterjee	Independent politician
1980	Kripa Shankar Chatterjee	Independent politician
1985	Kripa Shankar Chatterjee	Indian National Congress
1990	Gurudas Chatterjee	Marxist Co-ordination Committee
1995	Gurudas Chatterjee	Marxist Co-ordination Committee
2000	Gurudas Chatterjee	Marxist Co-ordination Committee
Jharkhand Legislative Assembly
2005	Aparna Sengupta	All India Forward Bloc
2009	Arup Chatterjee	Marxist Co-ordination Committee
2014	Arup Chatterjee	Marxist Co-ordination Committee
2019	Aparna Sengupta	Bharatiya Janata Party
2024	Arup Chatterjee	Communist Party of India (Marxist–Leninist) Liberation

== Election results ==
=== Assembly election 2024 ===
2024 Jharkhand Legislative Assembly election: Nirsa
Party	Candidate	Votes	%	±%
CPI(ML)L	Arup Chatterjee	104,855	43.74	New
BJP	Aparna Sengupta	1,03,047	42.98	▲0.78
JLKM	Ashok Kumar Mondal	16,316	6.81	New
BSP	Ranjeet Bauri	3,698	1.54	▲0.82
Independent	Pradeep Kumar Mandal	3,178	1.33	New
NOTA	None of the Above	4,734	1.97	▲0.17
Margin of victory		1,808	0.75	▼11.31
Turnout		2,39,735	72.22	▲4.01
Registered electors		3,31,939		▲7.27
CPI(ML)L gain from BJP		Swing	▲1.53	

=== Assembly election 2019 ===
2019 Jharkhand Legislative Assembly election: Nirsa
Party	Candidate	Votes	%	±%
BJP	Aparna Sengupta	89,082	42.21	▲17.07
MCC	Arup Chatterjee	63,624	30.14	▲4.49
JMM	Ashok Kumar Mandal	47,168	22.35	▲0.80
JVM(P)	Bampy Chakrawarty	2,007	0.95	New
Independent	Awadhesh Kumar Das	1,603	0.76	New
BSP	Bamapada Bauri	1,533	0.73	▼2.55
AIFB	Bhagwat Mahato	1,159	0.55	▼11.20
NOTA	None of the Above	3,800	1.80	▲0.14
Margin of victory		25,458	12.06	▲11.55
Turnout		2,11,063	68.21	▲0.01
Registered electors		3,09,439		▲4.95
BJP gain from MCC		Swing	▲16.55	

=== Assembly election 2014 ===
2014 Jharkhand Legislative Assembly election: Nirsa
Party	Candidate	Votes	%	±%
MCC	Arup Chatterjee	51,581	25.65	▼18.14
BJP	Ganesh Mishra	50,546	25.14	▲3.94
JMM	Ashok Kumar Mandal	43,329	21.55	▲14.63
AIFB	Aparna Sengupta	23,633	11.75	▲0.58
Independent	Anita Gorai	11,123	5.53	New
BSP	Tapan Bauri	6,588	3.28	New
CPI(ML)L	Nagendra Kumar	3,484	1.73	New
NOTA	None of the Above	3,330	1.66	New
Margin of victory		1,035	0.51	▼22.08
Turnout		2,01,077	68.20	▲10.58
Registered electors		2,94,847		▲7.87
MCC hold		Swing	▼18.14	

=== Assembly election 2009 ===
2009 Jharkhand Legislative Assembly election: Nirsa
Party	Candidate	Votes	%	±%
MCC	Arup Chatterjee	68,965	43.79	▲13.54
BJP	Ashok Kumar Mandal	33,388	21.20	▲1.95
AIFB	Aparna Sengupta	17,597	11.17	▼20.54
JMM	Bodi Lal Marandi	10,900	6.92	New
AITC	Uma Shankar Singh	7,384	4.69	New
INC	Suresh Chandra Jha	3,793	2.41	▼2.13
Independent	Samir Mahato	2,259	1.43	New
Margin of victory		35,577	22.59	▲21.12
Turnout		1,57,481	57.61	▼2.23
Registered electors		2,73,338		▲2.66
MCC gain from AIFB		Swing	▲12.08	

=== Assembly election 2005 ===
2005 Jharkhand Legislative Assembly election: Nirsa
Party	Candidate	Votes	%	±%
AIFB	Aparna Sengupta	50,533	31.72	▲1.95
MCC	Arup Chatterjee	48,196	30.25	▼0.15
BJP	Ashok Kumar Mandal	30,678	19.25	▲11.37
Independent	Bodi Lal Marandi	7,600	4.77	New
INC	Kripa Shankar Chatterjee	7,238	4.54	▼12.57
CPI(ML)L	Upendra Narayan Singh	5,057	3.17	▲0.64
Independent	Subodh Chandra Murmu	3,034	1.90	New
Margin of victory		2,337	1.47	▲0.84
Turnout		1,59,325	59.84	▲2.67
Registered electors		2,66,248		▲23.10
AIFB gain from MCC		Swing	▲1.32	

=== Assembly election 2000 ===
2000 Bihar Legislative Assembly election: Nirsa
Party	Candidate	Votes	%	±%
MCC	Gurudas Chaterjee	37,585	30.40	New
AIFB	Subrat Sengupta	36,804	29.76	New
INC	Kripa Shanker Chatterjee	21,163	17.11	New
BJP	Satyadeo Goshwami	9,755	7.89	New
JMM	Sunil Tudu	6,619	5.35	New
CPI(M)	Ganesh Dhar	3,753	3.04	New
CPI(ML)L	Dilip Mandal	3,128	2.53	New
Margin of victory		781	0.63	
Turnout		1,23,653	58.14	
Registered electors		2,16,283		
MCC win (new seat)				

== See also ==
- Vidhan Sabha
- List of states of India by type of legislature
