= Aparna Sengupta =

Indian politician (born 1969)

Member of the Jharkhand Legislative Assembly
- In office 2019 – 23 November 2024
- Preceded by: Arup Chatterjee
- Succeeded by: Arup Chatterjee
- Constituency: Nirsa

Personal details
- Born: 1969 (age 56–57) Nirsa, Dhanbad district, Jharkhand, India
- Party: Bharatiya Janata Party
- Spouse: Sushanto Sengupta (deceased)
- Education: Schooling completed in 1987
- Alma mater: Rajya Samposhit High School, Sarwa, Deoghar
- Occupation: Politician

Aparna Sengupta (born 1969) is an Indian politician from Jharkhand. She is an MLA from Nirsa Assembly constituency in Dhanbad district representing Bharatiya Janata Party. She won the 2019 Jharkhand Legislative Assembly election.

== Early life and education ==
Sengupta is from Nirsa, Dhanbad district. Her late husband is Sushanto Sengupta. She completed her schooling in 1987 at Rajya Samposhit High School, Sarwa, Deoghar. She discontinued her studies, thereafter.

== Career ==
Sengupta won the 2019 Jharkhand Legislative Assembly election from Nirsa Assembly constituency on Bharatiya Janata Party ticket. She polled 89,082 votes and defeated her nearest rival, Arup Chatterjee of Marxist Co-ordination Committee, by a margin of 25,458 votes.
