= Dev Dyal Kushwaha =

First agriculture minister of the state of Jharkhand

Dev Dayal Kushwaha

Member of the Jharkhand Legislative Assembly
- In office 1990–2005
- Constituency: Hazaribagh

Personal details
- Born: 2 January 1936
- Party: Bhartiya Janata Party
- Other political affiliations: All Jharkhand Students Union

Dev Dyal Kushwaha was an Indian politician, who served as first agriculture minister for the state of Jharkhand, after its formation. He was appointed as Minister for Agriculture in first Jharkhand government, which was led by Babu Lal Marandi. Kushwaha was a leader of Bhartiya Janata Party, who represented Hazaribagh Sadar Assembly constituency as Member of Legislative Assembly for three times. Before joining active politics he was associated with pedagogy. Kushwaha won the assembly elections of 1990, 1995 and 2000 from Hazaribagh Assembly constituency. Besides, Babu Lal Marandi's cabinet, he also served as a minister in Arjun Munda's cabinet. In 2005 Jharkhand Assembly elections, he was defeated by Saurabh Narain Singh— the grandson of Kamakhya Narain Singh.

== Biography ==
Born on 2 January 1936, Kushwaha was educated at Mahesara Middle School and later moved to Hazaribagh for his higher education. He was a member of Koeri caste. (Note: Though there are 35 contestants in the fray, the contest has limited to four main players, sitting BJP MLA and agriculture minister Dev Dayal Kushwaha, Congress' Saurabh Narayan Singh, RJD's Gautam Sagar Rana and independent candidate Brij Kishore Jaiswal, Kushwaha faces the biggest challenge of retaining the seat, which he has been holding for the last three terms. A major chunk of Koeri, Kurmi and Sokiyar, who constitute about 22 per cent of the voters, are with Kushwaha, a Koeri.) In 1955, he started working as a teacher and after some years, in 1969, he contested local bodies elections from Mahesara Panchayat. He was elected as Sarpanch (chief of rural local government) in 1972 and 1978. In 1980, he assumed the membership of Bhartiya Janata Party. Soon after joining BJP, he contested the legislative assembly elections in 1985, but was defeated. However, Kushwaha was able to win 1990 Assembly elections from Hazaribagh Assembly constituency as a candidate of BJP later. He followed this victory with two consecutive victories in assembly elections from same constituency in 1995 and 2000. He served as agriculture minister first and thereafter, he was also allotted Food and Civil Supplies and Building Construction department. Kushwaha shared good relationship with other BJP leaders like Kailashpati Mishra and Atal Bihari Vajpayee. He was arrested and imprisoned several times for being a part of Vananchal Movement, a movement demanding separate state.

Later, due to his dispute with Hazaribagh Member of Parliament, Yashwant Sinha, he defected from BJP along with another politician Loknath Mahto. They both joined All Jharkhand Students Union. During his tenure as Food and Civil Supplies minister in 2003, a food crisis erupted in Jharkhand, due to lack of coordination between Bihar State Food Corporation and Food Corporation of India. Since, Jharkhand was formed few years back bifurcating the state of Bihar, a separate State Food Corporation of Jharkhand was not existing and lack of coordination with Bihar State Food Corporation had created severe food shortage in the state. Kushwaha took steps to counter the situation. He also took steps to sort out the debt trap situation faced by cooperative banks of the state. Besides, he ensured that the formation of Land Development Bank shouldn't take place in Jharkhand, until the cooperative banks of state attain a healthy balance sheet. As agriculture minister, Kushwaha was also involved in a dispute with officials of agriculture department over a contractual appointment in World Bank-sponsored Agricultural Technology Management Agency (ATMA) scheme. Kushwaha was also an enthusiastic supporter of the rights of peasants and labourers and he participated in several farmers' right movements. His inclusion into Arjun Munda's cabinet in 2004 was criticised by opposition leaders on the ground that a non bailable warrant was pending against him at the time of his appointment to the office.

Kushwaha died in 2018, at a hospital in Ranchi. He was suffering from breathing problem and was being diagnosed therein. His funeral was attended by several politicians of the Jharkhand, which includes, Bhubneshwar Prasad Mehta and Yashwant Sinha. In his lifetime, Kushwaha was an active member of Jharkhand unit of Kushwaha Mahasabha— an organisation working for socio-political rights of Kushwaha caste.

== See also ==
- Samrat Choudhary
- Upendra Kushwaha
- Keshav Prasad Maurya
- Swami Prasad Maurya
- Krishna Nandan Prasad Verma
