= Jharia Assembly constituency =

Constituency of the Jharkhand legislative assembly in India

Coordinates: 23.742°N 86.413°E

Jharia
- Constituency No. 41 for the Jharkhand Legislative Assembly

Constituency details
- Country: India
- Region: East India
- State: Jharkhand
- District: Dhanbad
- Lok Sabha constituency: Dhanbad
- Established: 2000
- Reservation: None

Member of Legislative Assembly
- 5th Jharkhand Legislative Assembly
- Incumbent Ragini Singh
- Party: Bhartiya Janata Party
- Elected year: 2024

Jharia Assembly constituency is an assembly constituency in the Indian state of Jharkhand.

== Members of the Legislative Assembly ==
Election	Member	Party
Bihar Legislative Assembly
Before 1967: Constituency did not exist
1967	S. R. Prasad	Indian National Congress
1969	Sheo Kumar Rai	Bharatiya Kranti Dal
1972	Sheo Kumar Rai	Communist Party of India
1977	Suryadeo Singh	Janata Party
1980	Suryadeo Singh	Janata Party
1985	Suryadeo Singh	Janata Party
1990	Suryadeo Singh	Janata Dal
1991^	Abo Devi Raju Yadav	Janata Dal
1995	Abo Devi Raju Yadav	Janata Dal
2000	Bachcha Singh	Samata Party
Jharkhand Legislative Assembly
2005	Kunti Suryadeo Singh	Bharatiya Janata Party
2009	Kunti Suryadeo Singh	Bharatiya Janata Party
2014	Sanjeev Suryadeo Singh	Bharatiya Janata Party
2019	Purnima Niraj Singh	Indian National Congress
2024	Ragini Sanjeev Singh	Bharatiya Janata Party

=== Assembly election 2024 ===
2024 Jharkhand Legislative Assembly election: Jharia
Party	Candidate	Votes	%	±%
BJP	Ragini Sanjeev Singh	87,892	51.47%	▲8.74
INC	Purnima Niraj Singh	73,381	42.97%	▼7.36
JLKM	Md. Rustam Ansari	5,060	2.96%	New
Independent	Sonu Kumar Balmiki	1,110	0.65%	New
NOTA	None of the Above	1,908	1.12%	▲0.72
Margin of victory		14,511	8.50%	▲0.89
Turnout		1,70,758	56.42%	▲4.09
Registered electors		3,02,673		▼0.09
BJP gain from INC		Swing	▲1.14	

=== Assembly election 2019 ===
2019 Jharkhand Legislative Assembly election: Jharia
Party	Candidate	Votes	%	±%
INC	Purnima Niraj Singh	79,786	50.34%	▲24.10
BJP	Ragini Sanjeev Singh	67,732	42.73%	▼5.40
JVM(P)	Yogendra Yadav	2,779	1.75%	▼4.69
AJSU	Abadhesh Kumar	1,279	0.81%	New
Independent	Md Alam Ansari	1,006	0.63%	New
NOTA	None of the Above	636	0.40%	▼0.50
Margin of victory		12,054	7.60%	▼14.29
Turnout		1,58,509	52.32%	▼5.42
Registered electors		3,02,949		▲13.68
INC gain from BJP		Swing	▲2.20	

=== Assembly election 2014 ===
2014 Jharkhand Legislative Assembly election: Jharia
Party	Candidate	Votes	%	±%
BJP	Sanjeev Singh	74,062	48.14%	▲7.62
INC	Niraj Singh	40,370	26.24%	▼11.79
MCC	Md. Rustam Ansari	18,723	12.17%	New
JVM(P)	Yogendra Yadav	9,908	6.44%	New
CPI(M)	Nandlal Paswan	2,298	1.49%	▼2.22
BSP	Madan Mohan Ram	1,608	1.05%	▲0.28
JMM	Amit Kumar Sahu	1,184	0.77%	New
NOTA	None of the Above	1,392	0.90%	New
Margin of victory		33,692	21.90%	▲19.41
Turnout		1,53,863	57.74%	▲13.82
Registered electors		2,66,487		▼3.48
BJP hold		Swing	▲7.62	

=== Assembly election 2009 ===
2009 Jharkhand Legislative Assembly election: Jharia
Party	Candidate	Votes	%	±%
BJP	Kunti Singh	49,131	40.52%	▼2.89
INC	Suresh Singh	46,115	38.03%	▲16.42
RJD	Abo Devi Raju Yadav	9,207	7.59%	▼6.27
CPI(M)	Suresh Prasad Gupta	4,498	3.71%	▼2.32
Independent	Chandan Kumar Mahato	2,959	2.44%	New
Independent	Devilal Bhuia	1,025	0.85%	New
BSP	Birendra Kumar Singh	923	0.76%	New
Margin of victory		3,016	2.49%	▼19.31
Turnout		1,21,257	43.92%	▼7.06
Registered electors		2,76,086		▼2.86
BJP hold		Swing	▼2.89	

=== Assembly election 2005 ===
2005 Jharkhand Legislative Assembly election: Jharia
Party	Candidate	Votes	%	±%
BJP	Kunti Singh	62,900	43.41%	New
INC	Suresh Singh	31,312	21.61%	▲0.39
RJD	Yogendra Yadav	20,092	13.87%	▲2.96
CPI(M)	S.K. Bakshi	8,732	6.03%	New
LJP	Belal Khan	8,616	5.95%	New
Jharkhand Vananchal Congress	Shankar Rawani	3,965	2.74%	New
NCP	Ezaz Ahmad	1,508	1.04%	New
Margin of victory		31,588	21.80%	▲0.82
Turnout		1,44,897	50.98%	▼4.21
Registered electors		2,84,225		▲17.36
BJP gain from SAP		Swing	▲1.21	

=== Assembly election 2000 ===
2000 Bihar Legislative Assembly election: Jharia
Party	Candidate	Votes	%	±%
SAP	Bachcha Singh	56,401	42.20%	New
INC	Abdul Qaum Ansari	28,362	21.22%	New
RJD	Abo Devi Raju Yadav	14,577	10.91%	New
Independent	Yogendra Yadav	11,733	8.78%	New
JD(U)	Mundrika Paswan	6,985	5.23%	New
MCC	Nitai Mahato	6,656	4.98%	New
JMM	Saryug Mahato	3,319	2.48%	New
Margin of victory		28,039	20.98%	
Turnout		1,33,660	55.78%	
Registered electors		2,42,174		
SAP win (new seat)				

== See also ==
- List of constituencies of the Jharkhand Legislative Assembly
- Dhanbad district
