= Niraj (disambiguation) =

Niraj may refer to:

- Niraj a river in Romania
- Niraj Shah American businessman
- Purnima Niraj Singh Indian politician
- Niraj Antani American politician
