= RJM =

RJM may refer to:

- Rastriya Janamorcha, Nepali political party
- Rashtriya Jankranti Morcha, Indian political party
- Religious of Jesus and Mary, a Roman Catholic religious congregation of women
- River Jones Music, American record label based in Phoenix, Arizona
