= Loknath Mahto =

Former Member of Jharkhand Legislative Assembly

Loknath Mahato
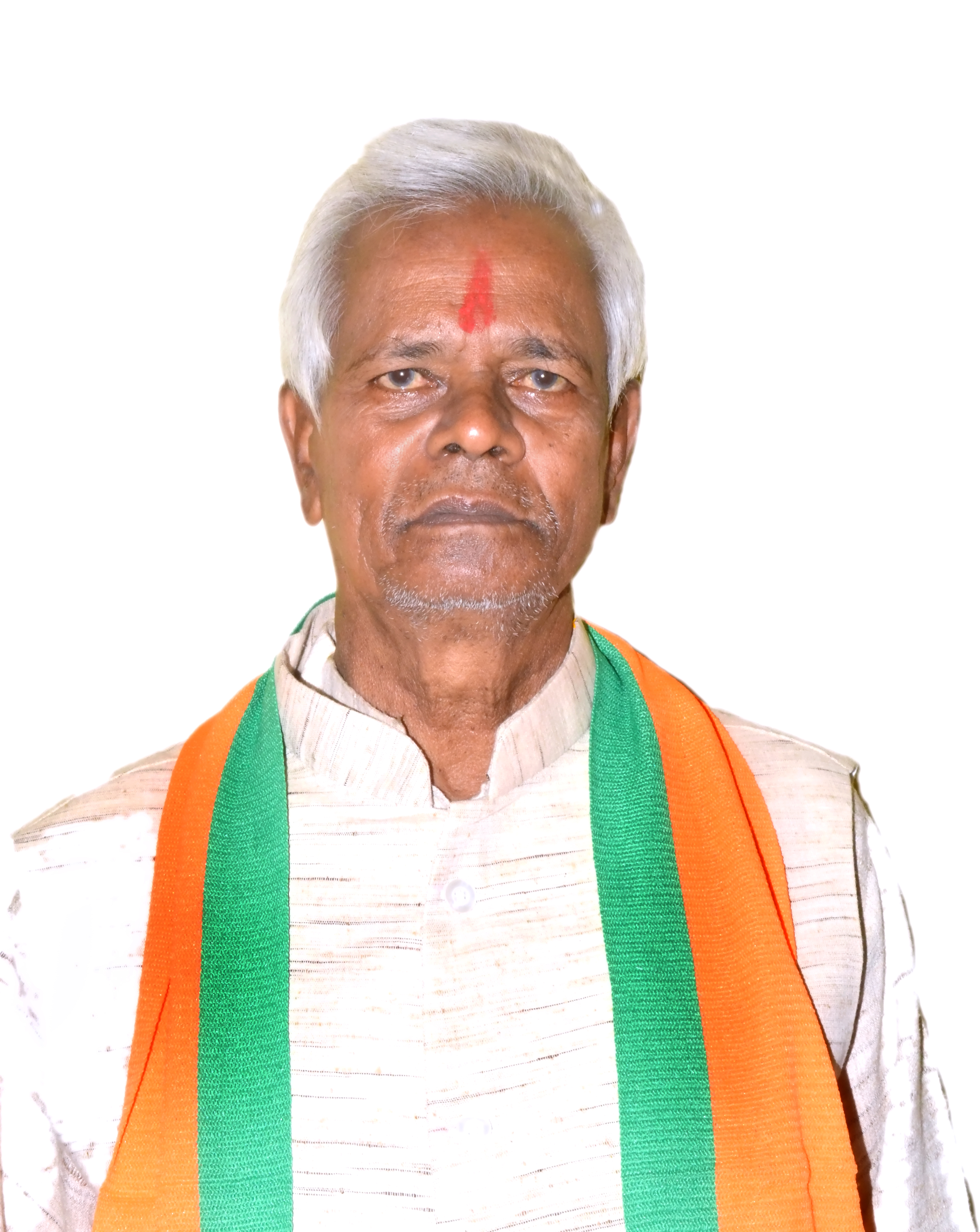

Personal details
- Born: 3 January 1945 (age 81) Barkagaon, Hazaribagh, Bihar Province, British India
- Party: Bharatiya Janata Party; All Jharkhand Students Union (2014-16)
- Spouse: Molani Devi

Loknath Mahato was a Member of Legislative Assembly (MLA) in the state of Jharkhand, India, elected from constituency Barkagaon which is in the Hazaribagh district of the state. He was first elected in 1995. Since then he has been re-elected three times, representing the Bharatiya Janata Party (BJP), one of the main national parties of India. He was one of the contenders in the 12 December 2019 Jharkhand state assembly elections from Bhartiya Janata Party (BJP). In 2014, Mahto had left BJP to join All Jharkhand Students Union, when denied ticket to contest from Hazaribagh Lok Sabha constituency. He participated in 2014 Lok Sabha elections and finished at third position.

== Biography ==
Mahto has served as Member of Jharkhand Legislative Assembly for three terms. He had the distinction of being MLA from 1995 to 2010 consecutively from the Barkagaon Assembly constituency, which has preponderance of Kushwaha and Kurmi caste. Mahto was among the leaders, who believed that politics is a kind of service. Despite being a legislator, he used to lead an austere life, often seen transplanting paddy in his fields himself. A believer in idealistic politics of Mahatma Gandhi and Ram Manohar Lohia, Mahto had spoken to media outlets that even after his election as Member of Legislative Assembly, his wife continued their traditional family occupation of selling vegetables in local market. Mahto spent a large part of his salary as MLA in helping people marry their daughters and for their medical expenses. In 2005, due to his in-house performance in Jharkhand Legislative Assembly, he was awarded with the title of 'Best MLA of Jharkhand'. Mahto was associated with Bhartiya Janata Party for fifteen years, however, in 2014 Lok Sabha elections, BJP fielded Jayant Sinha, son of former Finance Minister, Yashwant Sinha from Hazaribagh Lok Sabha constituency as their candidate. Showing resentment to party's decision of not giving due importance to old political workers, and preferring young Sinha over other experienced leaders, Mahto left BJP to join All Jharkhand Students Union (AJSU).

In 2014 Lok Sabha elections, Mahto contested in a tripolar contest, with Jayant Sinha as BJP candidate and Saurabh Narain Singh as Indian National Congress candidate. Prior to election, he campaigned along with his wife Moolani Devi. Mahto campaigned on the question that despite, Sinha's father, Yashwant Sinha being Finance Minister and Member of Indian Parliament from Hazaribagh constituency, no developmental work were done for the people of constituency. Meanwhile, he highlighted his own contribution as Member of Jharkhand Legislative Assembly before the electorate. Mahto had been vocal for assuring jobs and rehabilitation for families of workers who died working in the collieries of Central Coalfield ltd. Speaking to media outlets, he said that he was assured of his victory on the account of works done by him in the region for past fifteen years as an MLA. Sinha campaigned primarily on the question of victory for Narendra Modi and his re-election as Prime Minister. It was reported that date of voting in this constituency was also extended due to Ram Navmi festival, as Hazaribagh was considered as a communally sensitive constituency.

The Hazaribagh Lok Sabha constituency fell in Ramgarh region, and it was one of the richest coal mine area of Jharkhand. As per political analysts, Mahto had an edge in this constituency as the support of Mahto samaj— a term used to describe Koeri and Kurmi community— in this constituency was considered important for victory of any candidate. Besides himself hailing from Koeri community, Mahto had backing of All Jharkhand Students' Union MLA Chandra Prakash Choudhary, a member of Kurmi caste. Besides these three candidates, Bhubneshwar Prasad Mehta was also contesting as a candidate of Communist Party of India. Mehta had previously been a Member of Indian Parliament from this constituency twice. However, after the results were out, Jayant Sinha was able to win the Hazaribagh Lok Sabha elections of 2014, with Saurabh Narayan Singh logging in second position. Mahto was defeated, however he fared well, garnering 1,56,186 votes, and finishing as second runner-up.

In 2016, Mahto, along with former Jharkhand minister Dev Dyal Kushwaha rejoined Bhartiya Janata Party. In 2018, Mahto along with Kushwaha was involved in protest for CBI inquiry into a case of mob lynching of a man called Alimuddin Ansari, in which local BJP leaders were found to be accused. The protesters alleged that innocent people were framed in the lynching case, and the death of victim happened in police custody.

Mahto was a participant in the programs conducted by Jagdev Vichar Manch, an organisation furthering the ideology of socialist leader Jagdeo Prasad. He also served as an office bearer of Jharkhand unit of Kushwaha Mahasabha, a caste organisation.

== See also ==
- Jai Prakash Verma

== Sources ==
- Jharkhand Legislative Assembly elections 1
- Jharkhand Legislative Assembly elections 2
