= Gurudas Chatterjee =

Indian politician (assassinated in 2000)

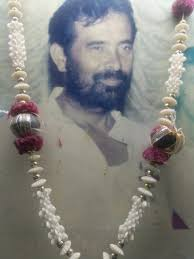
- Gurudas Chatterjee

Member of the Bihar Legislative Assembly
- In office 1990–2000
- Constituency: Nirsa

Personal details
- Died: April 14, 2000 (aged 56) Near Deoli village, Govindpur, Jharkhand, India
- Party: Marxist Coordination Committee
- Profession: Politician

Gurudas Chatterjee was an Indian politician who served as a three-time member of the Legislative Assembly (MLA) from the Nirsa Assembly constituency in the eastern state of Jharkhand, India. Representing the Marxist Coordination Committee (MCC), he focused on issues related to corruption and illegal mining in the coal belt region of Bihar and Jharkhand.

== Early life and education ==
Chatterjee began his political career with the Marxist Coordination Committee, working on issues concerning communities in coal mining regions.

== Political career ==
Chatterjee was elected as the MLA for Nirsa in 1990, 1995, and 2000. His political platform included opposition to the exploitation of workers and illegal activities.

Chatterjee spoke out against illegal coal mining and criticized the alleged involvement of politicians, contractors, and technocrats in corrupt practices in the region.

== Assassination ==
On April 14, 2000, Chatterjee was assassinated near Deoli village in the Govindpur police station area by hired assailants Shiv Shankar Singh and Umesh Singh. His death led to protests. A lower court initially sentenced five accused to life imprisonment, but the high court later acquitted three due to lack of evidence and sentenced the two main assailants to death.

== Legacy ==
Chatterjee's political work included opposing corruption and advocating for underprivileged communities. His assassination drew attention to the risks faced by those who challenged corruption in the region.

== Chatterjee family ==
- Gurudas Chatterjee – Former Member of Bihar Legislative Assembly.
- Arup Chatterjee – Current Member of Jharkhand Legislative Assembly (son of Gurudas Chatterjee).

== See also ==
- Marxist Coordination Committee
- Nirsa Assembly constituency
