= Purnima Niraj Singh =

Indian politician

Member of the Jharkhand Legislative Assembly
- In office 2019–2024
- Preceded by: Sanjeev Singh
- Succeeded by: Ragini Singh
- Constituency: Jharia

Personal details
- Born: 21 November 1985 (age 40) Varanasi, Uttar Pradesh
- Spouse: Niraj Rajnarain Singh
- Education: Amity University, Noida

Purnima Niraj Singh (born 21 November 1985) is an Indian politician and a former member of the Jharkhand Legislative Assembly from Jharia constituency in Dhanbad district. She married late Niraj Singh, the ex-Deputy of Dhanbad.

== Career ==
She is Widow of Niraj Singh who is son of Raj Narain Singh younger brother of former minister and MLA Suryadeo Singh. She contested the 2019 Jharkhand State Assembly Polls from Jharia as a Mahagathbandhan and Indian National Congress candidate against her sister-in-law Ragini Singh, the wife of Sanjeev Singh an accused in the murder of her late husband Niraj Singh. Winning the elections by a margin of 12054 votes, her victory also marks a first for the Mahagathbandhan in the Jharia Assembly Seat.

== Positions held ==
Year	Description
2019	Member, Jharkhand Legislative Assembly from Jharia
2020	•Member, Standing Committee on Library Development Committee •Member, Standing Committee on Request Committee
