= Ragini Singh =

Indian politician

Member of the Jharkhand Legislative Assembly
- Incumbent
- Assumed office 2024-Present
- Preceded by: Purnima Niraj Singh
- Constituency: Jharia

Personal details
- Born: 23 January 1981 (age 45)
- Party: Bharatiya Janata Party
- Spouse(s): Rajeev Suryadeo Singh (died 2003) Sanjeev Suryadeo Singh
- Relatives: Suryadeo Singh (father-in-law)

Ragini Sanjeev Singh (born 1981) is an Indian politician from Jharkhand. She is an MLA from Jharia Assembly constituency in Dhanbad district. She won the 2024 Jharkhand Legislative Assembly election, representing the Bharatiya Janata Party.

== Early life and education ==
Ragini is from Jharia, Dhanbad district, Jharkhand. She married Sanjeev Singh, also a politician, and her late father in law is a former MLA, Suryadeo Singh.

== Career ==
Ragini won from Jharia Assembly constituency representing Bharatiya Janata Party in the 2024 Jharkhand Legislative Assembly election. She polled 87,892 votes and defeated her nearest rival, Purnima Niraj Singh of the Indian National Congress, by a margin of 14,511 votes. Earlier in the 2019 Jharkhand Legislative Assembly election, she lost to her sister-in-law Purnima Niraj Singh of the Indian National Congress, by a margin 12,054 votes. Ragini contested on BJP ticket and polled 67,732 votes against Purnima's 79,786 votes.
