= Political families of Odisha =

List of Indian political families based in Odisha

The list of political families, (where there have been more than one leader in a single family) from Odisha state of India. This only lists politician members. The Biswal Family

- Chiranjib Biswal
- Ranjib Biswal

The Mahatab Family

- Harekrushna Mahatab
- Bhartruhari Mahtab, son of Harekrushna Mahatab

The Patnaik Family

- Biju Patnaik
- Naveen Patnaik, son of Biju Patnaik

The Kanungo Family

- Sarala Devi
- Nityanand Kanungo

The Satapathy Family

- Nandini Satpathy
- Tathagata Satapathy, son of Nandini Satapathy

The Pattanaik(j) family

- Janaki Ballabh Patnaik
- Jayanti Patnaik wife of above

Routray Family

- Nilamani Routray

The Singhdeo Family

- Rajendra Narayan Singh Deo
- Raj Raj Singh Deo
- Ananga Udaya Singh Deo
- Arkesh Singh Deo

The Amin Family

- Dewan Athar Mohammed
- Sayeed Mohammed
- Afzal-ul Amin
- Hussain Rabi Gandhi
