= Sanjeev Singh =

Indian politician

Mayor of Dhanbad
- Incumbent
- Assumed office 18 March 2026

Member of the Jharkhand Legislative Assembly
- In office (2014–2019)
- Constituency: Jharia (Vidhan Sabha constituency)

Personal details
- Born: 5 February 1986 Sindri (Dhanbad), Jharkhand
- Party: Independent(2026-present) Bharatiya Janata Party (2014-2026)
- Spouse: Ragini Singh
- Parent(s): Suryadeo Singh (Father); Kunti Singh (Mother)

Sanjeev Suryadeo Singh (born 1986) is an Indian politician from Jharkhand. He is an elected member of the Jharkhand Legislative Assembly representing the Bharatiya Janata Party. He won the 2014 Jharkhand Legislative Assembly election from the Jharia constituency in Dhanbad district.

== Early life and education ==
Singh is from Sindri, Dhanbad district, Jharkhand. candidate. He passed Class 10 and later studied intermediate at Acharya JB Kirpalani Inter Collage, Jamalpur Balbia and passed the Madhyamik Shiksha Parishad, U.P. in 2000. He married Ragini Singh, who entered politics after he was accused of the alleged murder of his cousin Neeraj Singh. In the 2019 Assembly election his wife, Ragini Singh, lost to Purnima Neeraj Singh, widow of the late Neeraj Singh. His late father, Suryadeo Singh, was an Indian National Congress leader. Singh is the leader of the Janta Mazdoor Sangh which is affiliated with the Hind Mazdoor Sabha. It is a trade union in Dhanbad and in the Bharat Coking Coal Limited.

== Career ==
Singh won from Jharia Assembly constituency representing the Bharatiya Janata Party in the 2014 Jharkhand Legislative Assembly election. He polled 74,062 votes and defeated his nearest rival, Niraj Singh of the Indian National Congress, by a margin of 33,692 votes.

== Controversy ==
On 11 April 2017, Sanjeev Singh, was accused of the murder of his cousin Neeraj Singh, an Indian National Congress leader, and three others in a shootout in Dhanbad. All charges have been dropped and he is acquitted with honour. The incident apparently had taken place within jurisdiction of the Saraidhela Police Station, Dhanbad.
