= Sikaripara Assembly constituency =

Sikaripara
- Constituency No. 7 for the Jharkhand Legislative Assembly

Constituency details
- Country: India
- Region: East India
- State: Jharkhand
- District: Dumka
- Lok Sabha constituency: Dumka
- Established: 2000
- Total electors: 2,08,651
- Reservation: ST

Member of Legislative Assembly
- 5th Jharkhand Legislative Assembly
- Incumbent Alok Kumar Soren
- Party: JMM
- Alliance: MGB
- Elected year: 2024

Sikaripara Assembly constituency is an assembly constituency in the Indian state of Jharkhand.

== Overview ==
Sikaripara Assembly constituency covers: Sikaripara, Raneswar and Kathikund Police Stations in Dumka district.

This seat is reserved for Scheduled Tribes.

Sikaripara Assembly constituency is part of Dumka (Lok Sabha constituency).

== Members of Legislative Assembly ==
Election	Member	Party
Bihar Legislative Assembly
1952	William Hembrom	Jharkhand Party
1957-77: Constituency did not exist
1977	Babulal Kisku	Janata Party
1980	David Murmu	Jharkhand Mukti Morcha
1985	David Murmu	Jharkhand Mukti Morcha
1990	Nalin Soren	Jharkhand Mukti Morcha
1995	Nalin Soren	Jharkhand Mukti Morcha
2000	Nalin Soren	Jharkhand Mukti Morcha
Jharkhand Legislative Assembly
2005	Nalin Soren	Jharkhand Mukti Morcha
2009	Nalin Soren	Jharkhand Mukti Morcha
2014	Nalin Soren	Jharkhand Mukti Morcha
2019	Nalin Soren	Jharkhand Mukti Morcha
2024	Alok Kumar Soren	Jharkhand Mukti Morcha

== Election results ==
=== Assembly Election 2024 ===
2024 Jharkhand Legislative Assembly election: Sikaripara
Party	Candidate	Votes	%	±%
JMM	Alok Kumar Soren	102,199	58.63%	▲6.85
BJP	Paritosh Soren	61,025	35.01%	▲2.45
Independent	Habil Murmu	2,158	1.24%	New
Independent	Promila Marandi	1,176	0.67%	New
Indian National Socialistic Action Forces	Siman Murmu	1,060	0.61%	New
NOTA	None of the Above	3,791	2.17%	▼0.34
Margin of victory		41,174	23.62%	▲4.40
Turnout		1,74,313	75.55%	▲2.06
Registered electors		2,30,739		▲10.59
JMM hold		Swing	▲6.85	

=== Assembly Election 2019 ===
2019 Jharkhand Legislative Assembly election: Sikaripara
Party	Candidate	Votes	%	±%
JMM	Nalin Soren	79,400	51.78%	▲9.74
BJP	Paritosh Soren	49,929	32.56%	New
JVM(P)	Rajesh Murmu	5,164	3.37%	▼22.04
JD(U)	Salkhan Murmu	4,445	2.90%	New
Independent	Habil Murmu	2,375	1.55%	New
AITC	Munni Hansda	1,950	1.27%	New
Independent	Stephan Besra	1,830	1.19%	New
NOTA	Nota	3,852	2.51%	▼0.49
Margin of victory		29,471	19.22%	▲2.58
Turnout		1,53,333	73.49%	▼2.69
Registered electors		2,08,651		▲7.96
JMM hold		Swing	▲9.74	

=== Assembly Election 2014 ===
2014 Jharkhand Legislative Assembly election: Sikaripara
Party	Candidate	Votes	%	±%
JMM	Nalin Soren	61,901	42.04%	▲13.74
JVM(P)	Paritosh Soren	37,400	25.40%	▼1.97
LJP	Shivdhan Murmu	21,010	14.27%	New
INC	Raja Marandi	7,877	5.35%	New
Independent	Joseph Besra	3,096	2.10%	New
Independent	Sunil Besra	3,051	2.07%	New
Marxist Co-Ordination	Munni Hansda	2,644	1.80%	New
NOTA	None of the Above	4,418	3.00%	New
Margin of victory		24,501	16.64%	▲15.71
Turnout		1,47,226	76.18%	▲12.21
Registered electors		1,93,266		▲14.81
JMM hold		Swing	▲13.74	

=== Assembly Election 2009 ===
2009 Jharkhand Legislative Assembly election: Sikaripara
Party	Candidate	Votes	%	±%
JMM	Nalin Soren	30,474	28.30%	▼1.36
JVM(P)	Paritosh Soren	29,471	27.37%	New
JD(U)	Raja Marandi	29,009	26.94%	▲0.58
AITC	Munni Hansda	4,641	4.31%	New
RJD	Devid Murmu	3,816	3.54%	New
Independent	Pankaj Kumar Tudu	2,169	2.01%	New
Independent	Hopna Baski	2,157	2.00%	New
Margin of victory		1,003	0.93%	▼2.37
Turnout		1,07,673	63.96%	▲9.93
Registered electors		1,68,335		▼2.70
JMM hold		Swing	▼1.36	

=== Assembly Election 2005 ===
2005 Jharkhand Legislative Assembly election: Sikaripara
Party	Candidate	Votes	%	±%
JMM	Nalin Soren	27,723	29.66%	▼17.80
JD(U)	Raja Marandi	24,641	26.36%	New
AJSU	David Murmu	18,522	19.82%	New
CPI(ML)L	Sunil Kumar Marandi	7,800	8.34%	New
Independent	Albinius Murmu	3,283	3.51%	New
Independent	Ramjiban Dehri	2,526	2.70%	New
BSP	Babu Lal Kisku	1,955	2.09%	New
Margin of victory		3,082	3.30%	▼16.20
Turnout		93,471	54.03%	▲0.67
Registered electors		1,73,000		▲11.59
JMM hold		Swing	▼17.80	

=== Assembly Election 2000 ===
2000 Bihar Legislative Assembly election: Sikaripara
Party	Candidate	Votes	%	±%
JMM	Nalin Soren	39,259	47.46%	New
BJP	Chhoto Murmu	23,126	27.95%	New
Independent	Sunil Kumar Marandi	7,366	8.90%	New
INC	Promodani Hansdak	5,813	7.03%	New
CPI	Praful Soren	5,618	6.79%	New
RJD	Lalita Hembrom	603	0.73%	New
AMB	Shishu Hembrom	558	0.67%	New
Margin of victory		16,133	19.50%	
Turnout		82,727	54.09%	
Registered electors		1,55,038		
JMM win (new seat)				

== See also ==
- Shikaripara
- Ranishwar
- Kathikund
