= K. S. Chatterjee =

Indian politician

- Born: West Bengal
- Occupation: Politician
- Known for: Member of Bihar Legislative Assembly

Kripa Shankar Chatterjee is an Indian politician based in the states of Bihar & Jharkhand. He was elected to the Bihar Legislative Assembly as an Independent in the year 1977.

Thereafter he was re-elected as an Independent to the Bihar Legislative Assembly in the year 1980. In the year 1985 he was elected MLA on an Indian National Congress Ticket. K.S.Chatterjee was elected to the Bihar Legislative Assembly twice as an Independent candidate.

He joined the Indian National Congress and won in 1985 on a Congress ticket. He is a prominent Trade Union Leader in the Dhanbad region and is the President of Bihar Pradesh Colliery Mazdoor Congress

Chatterjee was among the first leaders to be detained under the National Security Act in 1980–1981. Ever since its inception the National Security Act has been widely abused by governmental authorities in order to detain trade union leaders, human rights activists, political opponents, underprivileged castes, and ordinary criminal suspects for long periods of time without the minimal safeguards that the Indian Constitution and international law demand. AK. Roy, MP and KS. Chatterjee, MLA and trade union leaders of Marxist Coordination Committee from Dhanbad were arrested and later released.
