= Khiru Mahto =

Indian politician

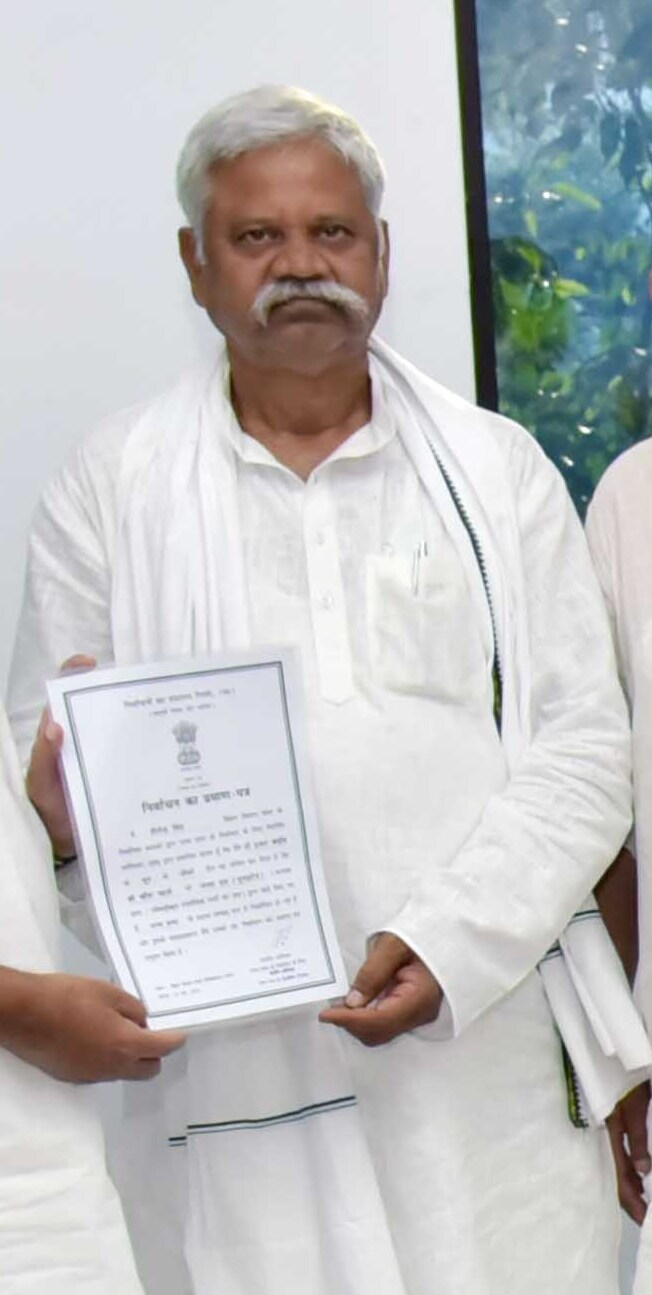
- Khiru Mahto, third from left with Janata Dal United leadership.

Member of Parliament, Rajya Sabha
- Incumbent
- Assumed office 4 July 2022
- Preceded by: Ramchandra Prasad Singh
- Constituency: Bihar

Member of Jharkhand Legislative Assembly
- In office 27 February 2005 – 23 December 2009
- Preceded by: Teklal Mahto
- Succeeded by: Teklal Mahto
- Constituency: Mandu

Personal details
- Born: 1953 (age 72–73) Hazaribagh, Jharkhand
- Party: Janata Dal (United)

Khiru Mahto (born 1953) is an Indian politician who is currently serving as member of Rajya Sabha from Bihar since 2022. He was elected to the Jharkhand Legislative Assembly from Mandu (Vidhan Sabha constituency) from 2005 until 2009. He is a member of the Janata Dal (United).
