= Hazaribagh Assembly constituency =

Constituency of the Jharkhand legislative assembly in India

Coordinates: 24.001°N 85.364°E

Hazaribagh
- Constituency No. 25 for the Jharkhand Legislative Assembly

Constituency details
- Country: India
- Region: East India
- State: Jharkhand
- District: Hazaribagh
- Lok Sabha constituency: Hazaribagh
- Established: 2000
- Total electors: 385,044
- Reservation: None

Member of Legislative Assembly
- 5th Jharkhand Legislative Assembly
- Incumbent Pradip Prasad
- Party: Bharatiya Janata party
- Elected year: 2024

Hazaribagh Assembly constituency is an assembly constituency in the Indian state of Jharkhand.

== Members of the Legislative Assembly ==
Election	Member	Party
Bihar Legislative Assembly
Before 1957: see Ramgarh cum Hazaribagh constituency
1957	Basant Narain Singh	Chota Nagpur Santhal Parganas Janata Party
1962	Gyani Ram	Indian National Congress
1967	Raghunandan Prasad	Jan Kranti Dal
1969	Raghunandan Prasad	Janata Party
1972	Raghunandan Prasad	Bharatiya Jana Sangh
1977	Rani De	Janata Party
1980	Raghunandan Prasad	Indian National Congress
1985	H. H. Rahman	Indian National Congress
1990	Dev Dyal Kushwaha	Bharatiya Janata Party
1995	Dev Dyal Kushwaha	Bharatiya Janata Party
2000	Dev Dyal Kushwaha	Bharatiya Janata Party
Jharkhand Legislative Assembly
2005	Saurabh Narain Singh	Indian National Congress
2009	Saurabh Narain Singh	Indian National Congress
2014	Manish Jaiswal	Bharatiya Janata Party
2019	Manish Jaiswal	Bharatiya Janata Party
2024	Pradip Prasad	Bharatiya Janata Party

=== Assembly election 2024 ===
2024 Jharkhand Legislative Assembly election: Hazaribagh
Party	Candidate	Votes	%	±%
BJP	Pradip Prasad	139,458	51.91%	▲2.79
INC	Munna Singh	95,981	35.73%	▲10.57
JLKM	Uday Kumar Mehta	14,070	5.24%	New
Independent	Harsh Ajmera	4,027	1.50%	New
NOTA	None of the Above	1,059	0.39%	▼0.67
Margin of victory		43,477	16.18%	▼7.78
Turnout		2,68,643	61.12%	▲4.96
Registered electors		4,39,552		▲14.16
BJP hold		Swing	▲2.79	

=== Assembly election 2019 ===
2019 Jharkhand Legislative Assembly election: Hazaribagh
Party	Candidate	Votes	%	±%
BJP	Manish Jaiswal	106,208	49.12%	▲4.70
INC	Dr. Ramchandra Prasad	54,396	25.16%	▲19.45
JVM(P)	Munna Singh	31,885	14.75%	▲13.41
AIMIM	Nadeem Khan	8,919	4.12%	New
Independent	Prakash Kumar Paswan	3,215	1.49%	New
Independent	Shakti Kumar Paswan	2,517	1.16%	New
Independent	Jailal Kumar	1,209	0.56%	New
NOTA	None of the Above	2,293	1.06%	▼0.11
Margin of victory		51,812	23.96%	▲10.52
Turnout		2,16,223	56.16%	▼3.96
Registered electors		3,85,044		▲14.65
BJP hold		Swing	▲4.70	

=== Assembly election 2014 ===
2014 Jharkhand Legislative Assembly election: Hazaribagh
Party	Candidate	Votes	%	±%
BJP	Manish Jaiswal	89,675	44.42%	▲5.55
Independent	Pradip Prasad	62,546	30.98%	New
CPI	Razi Ahmad	14,290	7.08%	New
INC	Jai Shankar Pathak	11,528	5.71%	▼39.47
JMM	Bhuneshwar Prasad	4,186	2.07%	▲0.17
JVM(P)	Irshad Bin Rahman	2,692	1.33%	New
Independent	Jayashri Ram	2,203	1.09%	New
NOTA	None of the Above	2,358	1.17%	New
Margin of victory		27,129	13.44%	▲7.13
Turnout		2,01,884	60.11%	▲6.30
Registered electors		3,35,843		▲22.75
BJP gain from INC		Swing	▼0.76	

=== Assembly election 2009 ===
2009 Jharkhand Legislative Assembly election: Hazaribagh
Party	Candidate	Votes	%	±%
INC	Saurabh Narain Singh	66,514	45.18%	▲19.13
BJP	Deo Dayal	57,227	38.87%	▲20.40
Independent	Baldeo Ram	4,379	2.97%	New
JMM	Sanjay Gupta	2,798	1.90%	New
RJD	Gulam Moy Nuddin	2,583	1.75%	▼3.21
Bahujan Shakty	Anup Kumar	2,432	1.65%	New
Independent	Madho Ram	1,751	1.19%	New
Margin of victory		9,287	6.31%	▲4.28
Turnout		1,47,235	53.82%	▼2.18
Registered electors		2,73,592		▲1.18
INC hold		Swing	▲19.13	

=== Assembly election 2005 ===
2005 Jharkhand Legislative Assembly election: Hazaribagh
Party	Candidate	Votes	%	±%
INC	Saurabh Narain Singh	39,431	26.04%	▼7.32
Independent	Braj Kishor Jaiswal	36,366	24.02%	New
BJP	Deo Dayal	27,964	18.47%	▼28.15
RJD	Gautam Sagar Rana	7,516	4.96%	▼0.92
Independent	Anamul Haque Ansari	5,279	3.49%	New
LJP	Birbal Prasad Mehta	4,000	2.64%	New
Independent	Vijay Kishor Prasad	3,623	2.39%	New
Margin of victory		3,065	2.02%	▼11.23
Turnout		1,51,415	56.00%	▲6.73
Registered electors		2,70,397		▲26.93
INC gain from BJP		Swing	▼20.58	

=== Assembly election 2000 ===
2000 Bihar Legislative Assembly election: Hazaribagh
Party	Candidate	Votes	%	±%
BJP	Deo Dayal	48,923	46.62%	New
INC	Lambodar Pathak	35,011	33.36%	New
RJD	Jeeb Lal Ram	6,171	5.88%	New
CPI	Ram Naresh Kumar	5,458	5.20%	New
Independent	Arjun Ram	2,664	2.54%	New
JMM	Man Mohan Metha	1,747	1.66%	New
Marxist Co-Ordination	Lalman Kushwaha	1,177	1.12%	New
Margin of victory		13,912	13.26%	
Turnout		1,04,944	49.76%	
Registered electors		2,13,025		
BJP win (new seat)				

== See also ==
- Vidhan Sabha
- List of states of India by type of legislature
