= Nirmal Mahto (Jharkhand politician) =

Indian politician

Member of the Jharkhand Legislative Assembly

Nirmal Mahto (born 1984) is an Indian politician from Jharkhand. He is an MLA from Mandu Assembly constituency in Hazaribagh District. He won the 2024 Jharkhand Legislative Assembly election, representing the All Jharkhand Students Union.

== Early life and education ==
Mahto is from Mandu, Hazaribagh District, Jharkhand. He is the son of Tulsi Mahto. He studied Class 10 at Rail Shramik High School, Patratu, and passed the examination conducted by the Bihar School Examination Committee.

== Career ==
Mahto won from Mandu Assembly constituency representing All Jharkhand Students Union in the 2024 Jharkhand Legislative Assembly election. He polled 90,871 votes and defeated his nearest rival, Jai Prakash Bhai Patel of the Indian National Congress, by a narrow margin of 231 votes. He lost the 2019 Jharkhand Legislative Assembly election losing to Jai Prakash, then with BJP, by a margin of 2,062 votes. However, after the victory, he offered to resign the seat and requested party president to enter the assembly by winning the by election.
