= Gyani Ram =

Indian politician

Member of Bihar Legislative Assembly
- In office 1962 – 1967
- Preceded by: Basant Narain Singh
- Succeeded by: Raghunandan Prasad
- Constituency: Hazaribagh

Personal details
- Occupation: Politician

Gyani Ram was the first representative of the Indian National Congress who was elected to the Bihar Legislative Assembly in 1962 from Hazaribagh constituency.
