= Barkagaon Assembly constituency =

Vidhan Sabha constituency in Jharkhand

Coordinates: 23.85°N 85.22°E

Barkagaon
- Constituency No. 22 for the Jharkhand Legislative Assembly

Constituency details
- Country: India
- Region: East India
- State: Jharkhand
- District: Ramgarh
- Lok Sabha constituency: Hazaribagh
- Established: 2000
- Total electors: 340,643
- Reservation: None

Member of Legislative Assembly
- 5th Jharkhand Legislative Assembly
- Incumbent Roshan Lal Choudhary
- Party: BJP
- Elected year: 2024

Barkagaon Assembly constituency is an assembly constituency in the Indian state of Jharkhand under Hazaribagh district. It consists of three blocks namely Barkagaon, Keredari and Patratu.

Indian National Congress MLAs in Jharkhand claimed that their colleague, Barkagaon's current MLA Nirmala Devi, was arrested on 25 August 2015 for a murder in the Hazaribagh district 9 days before. Fellow MLA, Irfan Ansari of Jamtara constituency, condemned the arrest, alleging that the government is trying to attack INC legislators by falsely accusing them of crimes they never committed. Its come under Hazaribagh district.

== Members of the Legislative Assembly ==
Election	Member	Party
Bihar Legislative Assembly
1952	Kamakhya Narain Singh	Chota Nagpur Santhal Parganas Janata Party
1957	Shashank Manjari	Chota Nagpur Santhal Parganas Janata Party
1962	Shashank Manjari	Swatantra Party
1967	Mahesh Ram	Bharatiya Jana Sangh
1969	Mahesh Ram	Janata Party
1972	Mahesh Ram	Bharatiya Jana Sangh
1977	Kailash Pati Singh	Janata Party
1980	Ramendra Kumar	Communist Party of India
1985	Ramendra Kumar	Communist Party of India
1990	Ramendra Kumar	Communist Party of India
1995	Loknath Mahto	Bharatiya Janata Party
2000	Loknath Mahto	Bharatiya Janata Party
Jharkhand Legislative Assembly
2005	Loknath Mahto	Bharatiya Janata Party
2009	Yogendra Sao	Indian National Congress
2014	Nirmala Devi	Indian National Congress
2019	Amba Prasad	Indian National Congress
2024	Roshan Lal Choudhary	Bharatiya Janata Party

== Election results ==
=== Assembly election 2024 ===
2024 Jharkhand Legislative Assembly election: Barkagaon
Party	Candidate	Votes	%	±%
BJP	Roshan Lal Choudhary	124,468	46.85%	▲32.67
INC	Amba Prasad	93,075	35.03%	▼9.09
JLKM	Baleshwar Kumar	26,867	10.11%	New
Independent	Aman Kumar	2,668	1.00%	New
CPI	Aniruddh Kumar	2,385	0.90%	▼0.31
AIMIM	Md Shamim Miyan	1,643	0.62%	▼0.73
Jharkhand Mukti Morcha (Ulgulan)	Sohar Mahto	1,638	0.62%	▼0.81
NOTA	None of the Above	1,179	0.44%	▲0.02
Margin of victory		31,393	11.82%	▼2.25
Turnout		2,65,680	68.82%	▲3.04
Registered electors		3,86,072		▲13.34
BJP gain from INC		Swing	▲2.72	

=== Assembly election 2019 ===
2019 Jharkhand Legislative Assembly election: Barkagaon
Party	Candidate	Votes	%	±%
INC	Amba Prasad	98,862	44.13%	▲14.89
AJSU	Roshan Lal Choudhary	67,348	30.06%	▲1.02
BJP	Loknath Mahto	31,761	14.18%	New
JVM(P)	Durga Charan Prasad	3,347	1.49%	▼5.63
Jharkhand Mukti Morcha (Ulgulan)	Suresh Mahto	3,205	1.43%	New
AIMIM	Pritam Singh	3,022	1.35%	New
CPI	Mithilesh Kumar Dangi	2,710	1.21%	▼6.66
NOTA	None of the Above	960	0.43%	▼0.52
Margin of victory		31,514	14.07%	▲13.87
Turnout		2,24,045	65.77%	▼0.10
Registered electors		3,40,643		▲6.12
INC hold		Swing	▲14.89	

=== Assembly election 2014 ===
2014 Jharkhand Legislative Assembly election: Barkagaon
Party	Candidate	Votes	%	±%
INC	Nirmala Devi	61,817	29.24%	▲3.40
AJSU	Roshan Lal Chaudhary	61,406	29.04%	▲11.05
JMM	Sanjeev Kumar	32,496	15.37%	▲3.35
CPI	Ramendra Kumar	16,631	7.87%	▲0.97
JVM(P)	Shivlal Mahto	15,068	7.13%	New
BSP	Deepak Kumar Das	3,851	1.82%	New
Independent	Kartik Mahto	3,122	1.48%	New
NOTA	None of the Above	2,002	0.95%	New
Margin of victory		411	0.19%	▼0.72
Turnout		2,11,447	65.87%	▲11.07
Registered electors		3,21,008		▲17.49
INC hold		Swing	▲3.40	

=== Assembly election 2009 ===
2009 Jharkhand Legislative Assembly election: Barkagaon
Party	Candidate	Votes	%	±%
INC	Yogendra Sao	38,683	25.83%	▲6.79
BJP	Loknath Mahto	37,319	24.92%	▼4.22
AJSU	Roshan Lal Choudhary	26,945	17.99%	New
JMM	Sanjeev Kumar	17,990	12.01%	▲2.31
CPI	Bindhyachal	10,329	6.90%	▼7.89
CPI(ML)L	Quamuddin Ansari	2,269	1.52%	▼0.49
Independent	Krishna Oraon	1,897	1.27%	New
Margin of victory		1,364	0.91%	▼9.19
Turnout		1,49,740	54.80%	▼4.15
Registered electors		2,73,225		▼0.73
INC gain from BJP		Swing	▼3.31	

=== Assembly election 2005 ===
2005 Jharkhand Legislative Assembly election: Barkagaon
Party	Candidate	Votes	%	±%
BJP	Loknath Mahto	47,283	29.14%	▼6.77
INC	Yogendra Sao	30,902	19.05%	▲12.98
CPI	Ramendra Kumar	23,992	14.79%	▼11.84
Independent	Shivlal Mahto	18,258	11.25%	New
JMM	Sanjeev Kumar	15,751	9.71%	▲2.80
CPI(ML)L	Pairu Pratap Ram	3,254	2.01%	▼0.62
BSP	Darshan Ganjhu	3,233	1.99%	New
Margin of victory		16,381	10.10%	▲0.81
Turnout		1,62,246	58.95%	▲11.73
Registered electors		2,75,221		▲14.05
BJP hold		Swing	▼6.77	

=== Assembly election 2000 ===
2000 Bihar Legislative Assembly election: Barkagaon
Party	Candidate	Votes	%	±%
BJP	Loknath Mahto	40,921	35.91%	New
CPI	Puran Ram Shahu	30,342	26.63%	New
Marxist Co-Ordination	Mithilesh Kumar Singh	10,882	9.55%	New
JMM	Shivlal Mahto	7,876	6.91%	New
RJD	Girdhari Gope	7,860	6.90%	New
INC	Idris Ansari	6,908	6.06%	New
CPI(ML)L	Guni Ouran	2,993	2.63%	New
Margin of victory		10,579	9.28%	
Turnout		1,13,955	47.92%	
Registered electors		2,41,318		
BJP win (new seat)				

== See also ==
- Vidhan Sabha
- List of states of India by type of legislature
