= Roshan Lal Choudhary =

Indian politician

Member of the Jharkhand Legislative Assembly
- Incumbent
- Assumed office 23 November 2024
- Constituency: Barkagaon

Personal details
- Born: 1965 Ramgarh, Ramgarh district, Jharkhand, India
- Party: Bharatiya Janata Party (2024–present); All Jharkhand Students Union (until 2024)
- Parent(s): Rijhunath Choudhary (father, deceased)
- Education: Graduate
- Alma mater: Ramgarh College, Vinoba Bhave University
- Occupation: Politician

Roshan Lal Choudhary (born 1965) is an Indian politician from Jharkhand. He is an MLA from Barkagaon Assembly constituency in Ramgarh district. He won the 2024 Jharkhand Legislative Assembly election, representing the Bharatiya Janata Party.

== Early life and education ==
Chaudhary is from Ramgarh, Jharkhand. He is the son of late Rijhunath Choudhary. He completed his graduation in 1989 at Ramgarh College, Ramgarh, which is affiliated with Vinoba Bhave University, Hazaribagh. His wife is a professor in Ranchi College.

== Career ==
Chaudhary won from Barkagaon Assembly constituency representing Bharatiya Janata Party in the 2024 Jharkhand Legislative Assembly election. He polled 1,24,468 votes and defeated his nearest rival, Amba Prasad Sahu of the Indian National Congress, by a margin of 31,393 votes. He contested on All Jharkhand Students Union ticket and lost thrice in the 2009, 2014 and 2019 Assembly elections. Later, he joined the BJP and won the 2024 election.
