= Nalin Soren =

Indian politician

Member of Parliament, Lok Sabha
- Incumbent
- Assumed office 4 June 2024
- Preceded by: Sunil Soren
- Constituency: Dumka

Member of Jharkhand Legislative Assembly
- In office 15 November 2000 – 4 June 2024
- Preceded by: State did not exist
- Succeeded by: Alok Kumar Soren
- Constituency: Sikaripara

Member of Bihar Legislative Assembly
- In office 1990 – 15 November 2000
- Preceded by: David Murmu
- Constituency: Sikaripara

Personal details
- Party: Jharkhand Mukti Morcha

Nalin Soren (Hindi pronunciation: [n̪əlɪn̪ soːɾeːn̪]) is an Indian politician from Dumka district in Santhal Pargana Division in Jharkhand state and an active member of the Jharkhand Mukti Morcha. He is an MLA since 1990, elected 7 times from Sikaripara (ST). In Lok Sabha election 2024, JMM candidate Nalin Soren won the Dumka Lok Sabha seat. Nalin Soren completed B.Sc. Part I from Sahibganj College, Bhagalpur University, in 1969.

== Political career ==
Nalin Soren was elected to the 18th Lok Sabha in June 2024 and has been serving as a Member of the Committee on Chemicals and Fertilizers since 26 September 2024. He served as the Chief Whip of the Jharkhand Mukti Morcha (JMM) on multiple occasions, holding the position from 22 December 2019, to 13 June 2024, as well as from 22 December 2014, to 2019, and from 1 March 2009, to 2014. Earlier, he served as a Cabinet Minister from 1 March 2005, to 2009.

== Electoral record ==
=== State Legislative Assembly ===
Year	Party	Constituency Name	Result	Votes gained	Vote share%	Margin
1985	Ind.	Sikaripara (Bihar) (ST)	Lost	9,478	23.58%	5,214
1990	JMM	Sikaripara (Bihar) (ST)	Won	27,799	44.12%	19,305
1995	JMM	Sikaripara (Bihar) (ST)	Won	36,073	36.96%	16,422
2000	JMM	Sikaripara (Bihar) (ST)	Won	39,259	47.46%	16,133
2005	JMM	Sikaripara (Jharkhand) (ST)	Won	27,723	29.66%	3,082
2009	JMM	Sikaripara (Jharkhand) (ST)	Won	30,474	28.30%	1,003
2014	JMM	Sikaripara (Jharkhand) (ST)	Won	61,901	42.04%	24,501
2019	JMM	Sikaripara (Jharkhand) (ST)	Won	79,400	51.78%	29,471

=== Lok Sabha ===
Year	Party	Constituency Name	Result	Votes gained	Vote share%	Margin
2024	JMM	Dumka (ST)	Won	547370	46.23%	22527

== See also ==
- List of members of the 18th Lok Sabha
