= Bandhu Tirkey =

Indian politician

Member of Jharkhand Legislative Assembly
- In office 2019–2022
- Preceded by: Gangotri Kujur
- Succeeded by: Shilpi Neha Tirkey
- Constituency: Mandar
- In office 2005–2014
- Preceded by: Deo Kumar Dhan
- Succeeded by: Gangotri Kujur
- Constituency: Mandar

Personal details
- Party: Indian National Congress (2020–present)
- Other political affiliations: Jharkhand Vikas Morcha (Prajatantrik); All India Trinamool Congress; Jharkhand Janadikhar Manch; United Goans Democratic Party

Bandhu Tirkey is an Indian politician from Jharkhand. He is a former Member of Jharkhand Legislative Assembly from Mandar Assembly constituency representing Jharkhand Vikas Morcha (Prajatantrik) in 2019.

Babulal Marandi expelled his party MLAs Pradeep Yadav and Tirkey from the party for anti-party activities. Both of them later joined Indian National Congress in its Delhi headquarters as Jharkhand Vikas Morcha (Prajatantrik) party was merged with Bharatiya Janata Party.

On 28 March 2022 Bandhu was convicted and sentenced to 3-year jail term related to corruption charges.

In April 2022, he was disqualified from the 5th Jharkhand Assembly after the conviction by the CBI court on disproportionate assets case.
