= Jai Prakash Bhai Patel =

Indian politician

Member of Jharkhand Legislative Assembly
- In office December 2019 – 2024
- Preceded by: Teklal Mahto
- Succeeded by: Nirmal Mahto
- Constituency: Mandu

Personal details
- Born: 12 June 1982 (age 43) Bishnugarh, Jharkhand
- Party: Indian National Congress (Since 2024)
- Other political affiliations: Bharatiya Janta Party (Before 2024)
- Parent: Tek Lal Mahto

Jai Prakash Bhai Patel is an Indian politician from Jharkhand. He was elected to the Jharkhand Legislative Assembly from Mandu Assembly constituency as a member of the Bharatiya Janta Party. Patel is a son of late Tek Lal Mahto. He left Bharatiya Janata Party and joined Indian National Congress on 20 March 2024.
