= Satapathy =

Indian surname

Satapathy (Odia: ଶତପଥୀ, pronounced [ɕɔt̪ɔpɔt̪ʰi]) is a Brahmin surname of Odisha with its roots tracing back to the Kanyakubja Brahmins. Alternative spellings include Satpathi, Satpati, Satpathy and Shatapathy.

People with this surname include:

- Nandini Satpathy, first female chief minister of Odisha
- Tathagata Satpathy, politician from Odisha
- Suparno Satpathy, socio-political leader from Odisha
- Ratikant Satpathy, renowned playback singer and media professional from Odisha
- Bijayini Satpathy, renowned Oddisi Dancer
- Malay Satapathy
