= Amba Prasad (politician) =

Indian politician

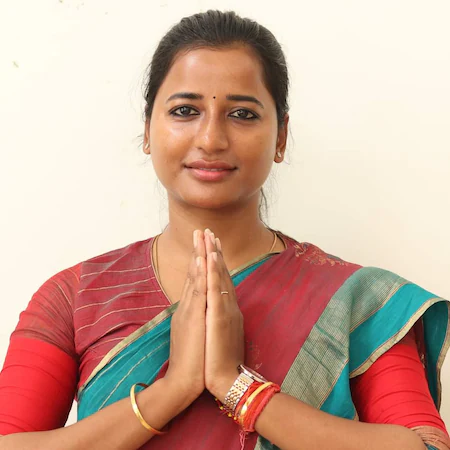

Member of the Jharkhand Legislative Assembly
- In office 2019 - 23 November 2024
- Preceded by: Nirmala Devi
- Constituency: Barkagaon

Personal details
- Born: 1994 or 1995 (age 31–32) Barkagaon, Jharkhand, India
- Party: Indian National Congress
- Parents: Yogendra Sao (father); Nirmala Devi (mother)
- Education: Vinoba Bhave University (LLB) Xavier Institute of Social Service (PGDM)
- Occupation: Advocate
- Profession: Politician

Amba Prasad is an Indian politician, lawyer, and social worker. From 2019 to 2024 she was a member of the Jharkhand Legislative Assembly, representing the Barkagaon Assembly Constituency.

== Early life ==
She is daughter of former MLA of Barkagaon Yogendra Sao. Her mother Nimala Devi was also MLA from Barkagaon who was jailed. She passed her matriculation from Carmel girl school, Hazaribagh in 2007 and Intermediate from DAV public school, Hazaribagh in 2009. She passed PGDM from Xavier Institute of Social Service in 2014. She completed LLB from Vinoba Bhabe University Hazaribagh in 2017.
