= Alok Kumar Soren =

Indian politician

Member of the Jharkhand Legislative Assembly
- Incumbent
- Assumed office 23 November 2024
- Preceded by: Nalin Soren
- Constituency: Sikaripara

Personal details
- Party: Jharkhand Mukti Morcha
- Parent: Nalin Soren (father)
- Profession: Politician

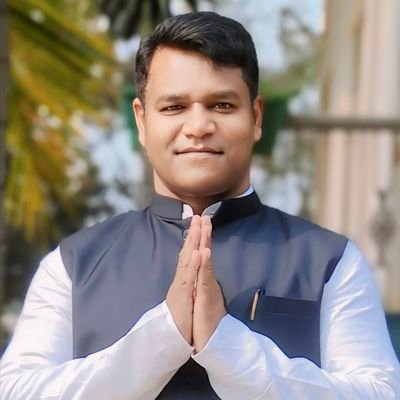
Alok Kumar Soren

Alok Kumar Soren is an Indian politician from Jharkhand. He is a member of the Jharkhand Legislative Assembly from 2024, representing Sikaripara Assembly constituency as a member of the Jharkhand Mukti Morcha.

== See also ==
- List of chief ministers of Jharkhand
- Jharkhand Legislative Assembly
