= Gangotri Kujur =

Indian politician

Gangotri Kujur is an Indian politician and member of the Bharatiya Janata Party. From 2014 to 2019, Kujur was a member of the Jharkhand Legislative Assembly from the Mandar constituency in Ranchi district.
