= Yogendra Sao =

Indian politician

Yogendra Sao is an Indian politician from the Indian National Congress party. He is a former agriculture minister in the Government of Jharkhand, where under his leadership Jharkhand state got first rank for pulse seed production across India.

== Political career ==
He was the representative from Barkagaon constituency in the Jharkhand Legislative Assembly during 2009-2014. Former minister fought for the right of displaced people and organised a series of protests by the residents of Barkagaon and Keredari Block under the leadership of Mr. Sao resulted in the raising of compensation rate payable to the owners of the land acquired by NTPC. The negotiations began at Rs. 3 lakh per acre and were finally settled at Rs. 15 lakh to Rs. 20 lakh per acre way back in 2015 through a tripartite agreement signed among the NTPC, State Government and the agitating villagers represented by Sao.

Soon after the agreement, a series of cases were lodged against Sao and his wife pursuant to which he surrendered at a court in Ranchi, where he was remanded in custody with his conditional bail cancelled, on multiple charges related to rioting and inciting of violence. Out of the several cases that were registered, Sao has been acquitted in 11 cases but convicted in one.
