= Mandar Assembly constituency =

Constituency of the Jharkhand legislative assembly in India

Coordinates: 23.46°N 85.09°E

Mandar
- Constituency No. 66 for the Jharkhand Legislative Assembly

Constituency details
- Country: India
- Region: East India
- State: Jharkhand
- District: Ranchi
- Lok Sabha constituency: Lohardaga
- Established: 2000
- Total electors: 332,615
- Reservation: ST

Member of Legislative Assembly
- 5th Jharkhand Legislative Assembly
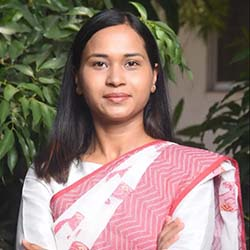
- Incumbent Shilpi Neha Tirkey
- Party: INC
- Alliance: MGB
- Elected year: 2024

Mandar Assembly constituency is one of the 81 constituencies of the Jharkhand Vidhan Sabha, located in Ranchi district. Mandar is part of Lohardaga Lok Sabha constituency along with four other Vidhan Sabha (Legislative Assembly) segments, namely, Sisai, Gumla, Bishnupur and Lohardaga. This constituency is reserved for the candidates belonging to the Scheduled tribes.

== Members of the Legislative Assembly ==
Election	Member	Party
Bihar Legislative Assembly
1952	Soma Bhagat	Indian National Congress
1957	Ram Vilas Prasad	Jharkhand Party
1957	Ignes Kujur	Jharkhand Party
1962	Zahoor Ali Mohammad	Indian National Congress
1967	S. Bhagat	Indian National Congress
1969	Shri Krishna Bhagat	Indian National Congress
1972	Shri Krishna Bhagat	Indian National Congress
1977	Karam Chand Bhagat	Indian National Congress
1980	Karam Chand Bhagat	Indian National Congress
1985	Ganga Bhagat	Indian National Congress
1990	Karam Chand Bhagat	Janata Dal
1995	Bishwanath Bhagat	Jharkhand Mukti Morcha
2000	Deo Kumar Dhan	Indian National Congress
Jharkhand Legislative Assembly
2005	Bandhu Tirkey	United Goans Democratic Party
2009	Bandhu Tirkey	Jharkhand Janadikhar Manch
2014	Gangotri Kujur	Bharatiya Janata Party
2019	Bandhu Tirkey	Jharkhand Vikas Morcha
2022^	Shilpi Neha Tirkey	Indian National Congress
2024	Shilpi Neha Tirkey	Indian National Congress

^by-election

== Election results ==
=== Assembly election 2024 ===
2024 Jharkhand Legislative Assembly election: Mandar
Party	Candidate	Votes	%	±%
INC	Shilpi Neha Tirkey	135,936	49.01%	▲4.58
BJP	Sunny Toppo	1,13,133	40.79%	▲7.38
BAP	Jagre Oraon	7,129	2.57%	New
JLKM	Guna Bhagat	3,107	1.12%	New
CPI(M)	Keerti Singh Munda	2,821	1.02%	▼5.47
Independent	Rekha Devi	2,492	0.90%	New
Independent	Vikash Jyoti Oraon	1,966	0.71%	New
NOTA	None of the Above	2,050	0.74%	▼0.49
Margin of victory		22,803	8.22%	▼2.80
Turnout		2,77,366	73.01%	▲11.84
Registered electors		3,79,903		▲8.14
INC hold		Swing	▲4.58	

=== Assembly by-election 2022 ===
2022 Jharkhand Legislative Assembly by-election: Mandar
Party	Candidate	Votes	%	±%
INC	Shilpi Neha Tirkey	95,486	44.43%	▲40.50
BJP	Gangotri Kujur	71,796	33.41%	▲2.55
Independent	Deo Kumar Dhan	22,424	10.43%	New
CPI(M)	Subhash Munda	13,941	6.49%	New
Independent	Sushil Oraon	2,641	1.23%	New
Navodaya Jantantrik Party	Dinesh Oraon	1,530	0.71%	New
Independent	Marshal Barla	1,311	0.61%	New
NOTA	Nota	2,634	1.23%	▼0.51
Margin of victory		23,690	11.02%	▲0.73
Turnout		2,14,909	61.70%	▼6.41
Registered electors		3,51,320		▲5.62
INC gain from JVM(P)		Swing	▲3.28	

=== Assembly election 2019 ===
2019 Jharkhand Legislative Assembly election: Mandar
Party	Candidate	Votes	%	±%
JVM(P)	Bandhu Tirkey	92,491	41.15%	New
BJP	Deo Kumar Dhan	69,364	30.86%	▲2.36
AIMIM	Shishir Lakra	23,592	10.50%	New
AJSU	Hemlata Oraon	15,708	6.99%	New
INC	Sunny Toppo	8,840	3.93%	▼6.92
Independent	Gladwin Paul Minz	2,142	0.95%	New
AITC	Philmon Toppo	1,794	0.80%	▼23.70
NOTA	None of the Above	3,895	1.73%	New
Margin of victory		23,127	10.29%	▲6.29
Turnout		2,24,785	67.58%	▲1.41
Registered electors		3,32,615		▲15.74
JVM(P) gain from BJP		Swing	▲12.64	

=== Assembly election 2014 ===
2014 Jharkhand Legislative Assembly election: Mandar
Party	Candidate	Votes	%	±%
BJP	Gangotri Kujur	54,200	28.50%	▲19.34
AITC	Bandhu Tirkey	46,595	24.50%	New
Independent	Deo Kumar Dhan	38,801	20.40%	New
INC	Ravindra Nath Bhagat	20,646	10.86%	▼7.85
SP	Sukhmani Tigga	8,055	4.24%	New
Independent	Hemlata Oraon	5,320	2.80%	New
Independent	Sheonath Tigga	3,312	1.74%	New
NOTA	None of the Above	4,281	2.25%	New
Margin of victory		7,605	4.00%	▼15.36
Turnout		1,90,165	66.17%	▲5.48
Registered electors		2,87,377		▲12.67
BJP gain from Jharkhand Janadikhar Manch		Swing	▼9.56	

=== Assembly election 2009 ===
2009 Jharkhand Legislative Assembly election: Mandar
Party	Candidate	Votes	%	±%
Jharkhand Janadikhar Manch	Bandhu Tirkey	58,924	38.06%	New
INC	Deo Kumar Dhan	28,953	18.70%	▼15.30
Rashtriya Kalyan Paksha	Chamra Linda	27,073	17.49%	New
BJP	Anil Oraon	14,189	9.17%	▼15.89
Jharkhand Party	Prabhakar Tirkey	4,767	3.08%	New
RJD	Dr. Diwakar Minz	4,496	2.90%	New
Independent	Jagdish Pahan	2,832	1.83%	New
Margin of victory		29,971	19.36%	▲0.44
Turnout		1,54,805	60.69%	▲5.86
Registered electors		2,55,065		▲30.76
Jharkhand Janadikhar Manch gain from UGDP		Swing	▼14.85	

=== Assembly election 2005 ===
2005 Jharkhand Legislative Assembly election: Mandar
Party	Candidate	Votes	%	±%
UGDP	Bandhu Tirkey	56,597	52.92%	New
INC	Deo Kumar Dhan	36,365	34.00%	▲6.41
BJP	Dr. Diwakar Minz	26,800	25.06%	▲0.28
Independent	Somra Oraon	3,230	3.39%	New
Independent	Jaiwant Tigga	3,217	3.38%	New
BSP	Jotwa Oraon	2,510	2.63%	New
AJSU	Sheonath Tigga	2,237	2.35%	New
Margin of victory		20,232	18.92%	▲16.09
Turnout		1,06,954	54.83%	▲11.10
Registered electors		1,95,067		▼0.21
UGDP gain from INC		Swing	▲25.32	

=== Assembly election 2000 ===
2000 Bihar Legislative Assembly election: Mandar
Party	Candidate	Votes	%	±%
INC	Deo Kumar Dhan	23,588	27.60%	New
BJP	Dr. Diwakar Minz	21,176	24.77%	New
RJD	Vanwa Tirkey Alias Bandhu Tirkey	13,070	15.29%	New
JMM	Vishwa Nath Bhagat	11,735	13.73%	New
SAP	Karam Chand Bhagat	10,220	11.96%	New
SP	Prabhakar Tirkey	2,458	2.88%	New
CPI	Martha Khalko Alias Maria Khalko	1,735	2.03%	New
Margin of victory		2,412	2.82%	
Turnout		85,479	44.61%	
Registered electors		1,95,479		
INC win (new seat)				

== See also ==
- Jharkhand Vidhan Sabha
- List of states of India by type of legislature
