= Tek Lal Mahto =

Indian politician

Member of Parliament, Lok Sabha
- In office 16 May 2004 — 17 May 2009
- Constituency: Giridih

Member of the Jharkhand Legislative Assembly
- In office December 2009 — September 2011
- Constituency: Mandu

Personal details
- Born: 15 February 1945 Hazaribagh, Bihar, (Now in Jharkhand), India
- Died: 27 September 2011 (aged 66) Jharkhand, India
- Party: JMM
- Spouse: Lakheshwari Devi
- Children: Ram Prakash Bhai Patel, Jai Prakash Bhai Patel and 3 daughters

Tek Lal Mahto (15 February 1945 – 27 September 2011) was a member of the 14th Lok Sabha of India. He was one of the founders and key members of the Jharkhand Mukti Morcha (JMM) political party, and served five terms in the Jharkhand state legislature. He was a delegate to the Bihar assembly in 1985, represented the Giridih constituency in the Lok Sabha between 2004 and 2009, and JMM from Mandu Assembly constituency at the time of his death. He died of a cardiac arrest at the hospital of Rajendra Institute of Medical Sciences where he was admitted the day before. He was survived by wife, two sons Ram Prakash Bhai Patel and Jai Prakash Bhai Patel with three daughters.
