= Rashtriya Jankranti Morcha =

Political party in India

- Abbreviation: RJM
- President: Abdul Mobin Rizvi
- General Secretary: Mahmood Alam
- Founder: Mister Alam Asrafee
- Founded: 27 November 2011 (14 years ago)
- ECI status: Unrecognized
- Alliance: Janmat

Election symbol
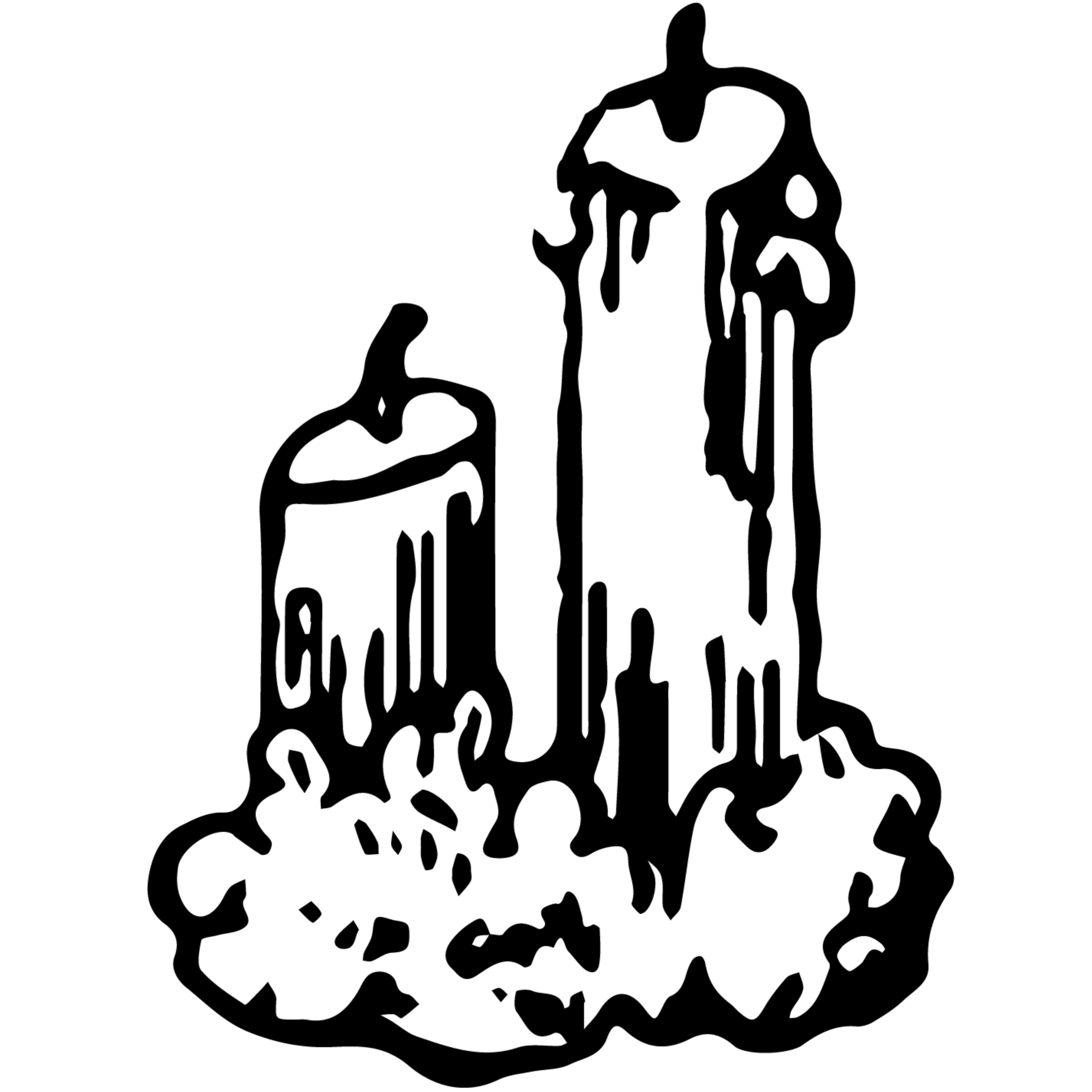

Website
- rajmo.in

The Rashtriya Jankranti Morcha (abbreviated as RJM; translation: National People's revolution Front) is an Indian political party based in the state of Jharkhand. The party was founded in 2011. Rashtriya Jankranti Morcha (RJM) is a registered political party through Election Commission of India in 2014. Also Rashtriya Jankranti Morcha (RJM) contested General Election from Chatra Lok Sabha constituency in 2014. There are 37 unrecognized registered political parties in the state of Jharkhand which will also contest Jharkhand assembly election in 2024 including Rashtriya Jankranti Morcha.

== History ==
Rashtriya Jankranti Morcha was established on 27 November 2011 by Mister Alam Asrafee in Chatra district.

Rashtriya Jankranti Morcha was formed on 27 November 2011.

The party is led by notable leaders with grassroots and activist backgrounds.

== List of Presidents ==
Presidents of Rashtriya Jankranti Morcha
Name	Term	Notes
Abdul Mobin Rizvi	2024–present	Contested from Dumri in the 2024 Jharkhand Assembly elections

== Electoral Performance ==
=== Lok Sabha Elections ===
Rashtriya Jankranti Morcha – Lok Sabha Election Results
Year	State	Constituency	Candidate	Votes	Vote Share	Result
2014	Jharkhand	Chatra	Mister Alam Asrafee	Not Available	Not Available	Lost

=== Jharkhand Assembly Election Results (2024) ===
Rashtriya Jankranti Morcha – Jharkhand Assembly Election Results (2024)
S.No	Candidate	Constituency	Votes	Vote Share (%)	Result
1	Abdul Latif Ansari	Madhupur	1,381	0.49 %	Lost
2	Abdul Mobin Rizvi	Dumri	857	0.38 %	Lost
3	Kalawati Devi	Tundi	267	Not Available	Lost
4	Md. Mahmood Alam	Mandu	725	Not Available	Lost
5	Md. Zahiruddin Khan	Jharia	126	Not Available	Lost
