= Saurabh Narain Singh =

Indian politician

Member of Jharkhand Legislative Assembly
- In office 2005-2014
- Succeeded by: Manish Jaiswal
- Constituency: Hazaribagh

Personal details
- Born: 21 January 1975 (age 51) New Delhi, India
- Party: Indian National Congress
- Spouse: Rani Ujwala Prabha

Saurabh Narain Singh (born 21 January 1975), present Maharaja Bahadur of Ramgarh (Ramgarh Raj) since 17 October 2008, (Laxmi Niwas Palace, Padma, District Hazaribagh, Jharkhand, India) is a member of the 2nd & 3rd Vidhan Sabha of Jharkhand representing the Indian National Congress from Hazaribagh. Member of the 2nd Vidhan Sabha of Jharkhand 2005-09 (M.L.A.)/- from Hazaribagh, Indian National Congress Party; member of the 3rd Vidhan Sabha of Jharkhand 2009-14 (M.L.A.)/- from Hazaribagh, Indian National Congress Party; chairman, Committee on Subordinate Legislation (J.V.S) 2010–2011; chairman, Public Accounts Committee (J.V.S.) 2011–2013; chairman, Zero Hour Committee (J.V.S.) 2013–14; member, State Wildlife Board of Jharkhand 2010–14.

Singh was born in New Delhi. He did his primary schooling from Hillgrange Preparatory School in Dehradun. Later he studied at The Modern School, The Doon School, Delhi University, Delhi, and University of Western Australia.
