= Arup Chatterjee =

Indian politician

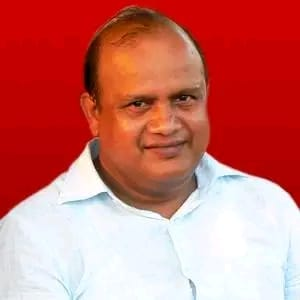
- Arup Chatterjee

Member of the Jharkhand Legislative Assembly
- Incumbent
- Assumed office 23 November 2024
- Preceded by: Aparna Sengupta
- Constituency: Nirsa
- In office 23 December 2009 – 23 December 2019
- Preceded by: Aparna Sengupta
- Succeeded by: Aparna Sengupta
- Constituency: Nirsa

Personal details
- Party: Communist Party of India (Marxist–Leninist) Liberation
- Profession: Politician

Arup Chatterjee is an Indian politician from Jharkhand. He is a member of the Jharkhand Legislative Assembly representing the Nirsa Assembly constituency, affiliated with the Communist Party of India (Marxist–Leninist) Liberation (CPI(ML)(L)).

== Early life and education ==
Chatterjee is the son of the late Gurudas Chatterjee, a former MLA from Nirsa known for his anti-corruption activism. He completed his graduation in 1994 at BBM Asansol and later earned a Post Graduate Diploma in Business Management from IILM, Kolkata in 1997.

== Political career ==
Chatterjee began his political journey with the Marxist Coordination Committee (MCC), a precursor to CPI(ML)(L). He was first elected as an MLA from Nirsa in the 2009 Jharkhand Legislative Assembly election and retained his seat in the 2014 election. After a brief hiatus, he returned to the assembly by winning the 2024 election representing CPI(ML)(L).

=== Election history ===
Nirsa Assembly Election Results
Year	Candidate	Party	Votes	Vote Share	Position	Margin
2009	Arup Chatterjee	Marxist Coordination Committee	69,000+	43.5%	Winner	—
2014	Arup Chatterjee	Marxist Coordination Committee	51,581	25.65%	Winner	—
2019	Aparna Sengupta	BJP	89,082	42.21%	Winner	—
2024	Arup Chatterjee	CPI(ML)(L)	104,855	43.74%	Winner	1,808

== Personal life ==
Arup Chatterjee is married; his spouse works as a home tutor. His profession is politics.
