= Suryadeo Singh =

Indian politician and mafia leader pagal

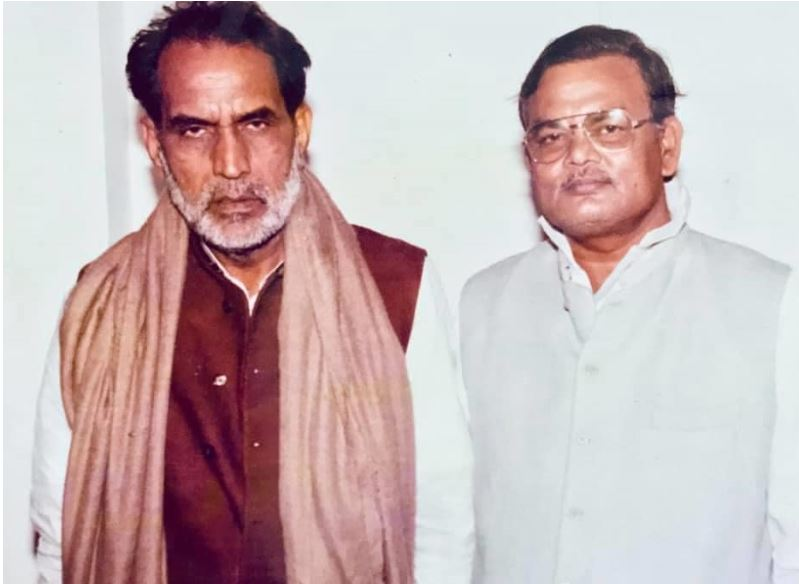
- Suryadeo Singh with Chandra Shekhar

Member of the Bihar Legislative Assembly
- In office (1977-1980), (1980-1985), (1985-1990), (1990 – 1995)
- Preceded by: Sheo Kumar Rai
- Succeeded by: Abo Devi Raju Yadav
- Constituency: Jharia (Vidhan Sabha constituency)

Personal details
- Born: 27 December 1939 Goniha Chapra Bairiya, Ballia, Uttar Pradesh, British India
- Died: 15 June 1991 (aged 51) Ballia
- Party: Janata Party (1977-1990); Janata Dal (1990-1991)
- Spouse: Kunti Singh
- Children: 5

Suryadeo Singh (27 December 1939 – 15 June 1991) was an Indian mafia leader and politician from Jharkhand.

He ran a protection racket in Dhanbad and was a major financier for the Janata Party. In 1977, he won assembly elections on JP's ticket and became a close associate to future Prime Minister Chandra Shekhar. As of 1984, he had at least 17 murder charges. He was arrested in 1988 over the charges of murder, extortion, and rioting but he was later released.

He was a Member of Legislative Assembly (MLA) from the Jharia constituency between 1977 and 1991. He was the founder and chairman of Janta Majdoor Sangh, a trade union in Jharkhand.

He died on 15 June 1991 in Dhanbad, Jharkhand during his visit to Ranchi High Court.
