= Kunti Singh =

Indian politician

Kunti Singh is an Indian politician and member of the Bharatiya Janata Party. Singh was a member of the Jharkhand Legislative Assembly from the Jharia constituency in Dhanbad district. She is President of Janata Mazdoor Sangh.
