= Marxist Co-ordination Committee =

- Abbreviation: MCC
- General Secretary: Arup Chatterjee
- Founder: A. K. Roy
- Founded: 1971 (55 years ago)
- Dissolved: 2024 (2 years ago)
- Split from: Communist Party of India (Marxist)
- Merged into: CPI(ML) Liberation
- Headquarters: Ranchi, Jharkhand
- Ideology: Communism; Marxism-Leninism
- Political position: Left-wing
- Colours: Red

The Marxist Co-ordination Committee (MCC) was a political party in Jharkhand, India, based around the coal mining region of Dhanbad. MCC operated from 1971 to 2024 till its merger with CPI(ML) Liberation.

Marxist Co-ordination Committee since its inception was closely associated with the Communist Party of India (Marxist-Leninist) Liberation and merged with the party in September 2024. CPI(ML)L held its first meeting after the merger on 10–11 September where five MCC leaders were inducted into its central committee.

Originally founded as Janwadi Kisan Sangram Samiti (English: Democratic Peasants' Struggle Association) was formed in 1971 after local communist leader A. K. Roy had been expelled from the Communist Party of India (Marxist). JKSS was later renamed to the MCC. The party was led by Roy, who has been elected MP three times.

Roy was active in the Jharkhand movement and helped develop the organisation which would later become Jharkhand Mukti Morcha. As Jharkhand Mukti Morcha developed into a political party, the relations between the two soured.

In 1980, A. K. Roy (then an MP) and K.S. Chatterjee, a member of the Bihar Legislative Assembly, were arrested under the National Security Act. In total, Roy has been jailed four times.

Chatterjee had been elected to the Bihar Legislative Assembly twice as an independent candidate. He joined the Indian National Congress and won in 1985 on a Congress ticket. He is a prominent trade union leader in the Dhanbad region and is the President of Bihar Pradesh Colliery Mazdoor Congress.

In 1998, the only member of the Bihar Legislative Assembly representing the MCC, Gurudas Chatterjee, was murdered by the coal mafia. Chatterjee's son, Arup Chatterjee, took over his mandate after a by-poll.

== Members of Lok Sabha ==
Lok Sabha	Name	Constituency	Margin
6th & 7th Loksabha		Dhanbad Lok Sabha constituency Dhanbad Lok Sabha constituency	1,41,849 & 15,306
9th Lok Sabha	[[A.K Roy]]	Dhanbad Lok Sabha constituency Dhanbad Lok Sabha constituency	13,571

== Merge in to CPIML ==
On 9 September 2024, MCC party merge in to CPIML(L) after a rally was organised by the CPIML(L) & Marxist Co-ordination Committee jointly at Dhanbad, Jharkhand.

On 11 September 2024, MCC party General Secretary Comrade Arup Chatterjee selected as new Central Committee member of CPIML(L).
