= List of departments of the government of Jharkhand =

The Government of Jharkhand functions through various administrative departments responsible for governance and implementation of public policies in the state of Jharkhand. Each department is headed politically by a elected minister and administratively by an officer of the Indian Administrative Service (IAS).

== List ==
S. No.	Department	Minister responsible	Official website
1	Personnel, Administrative Reforms and Rajbhasha	Hemant Soren	Website
2	Home, Jail and Disaster Management	Hemant Soren	Website
3	Finance	Radha Krishna Kishore	Website
4	Health, Medical Education and Family Welfare	Irfan Ansari	Website
5	Higher and Technical Education	Sudivya Kumar	Website
6	School Education and Literacy	Hemant Soren	Website
7	Urban Development and Housing	Sudivya Kumar	Website
8	Revenue, Registration and Land Reforms	Deepak Birua	Website
9	Rural Development	Dipika Pandey Singh	Website
10	Panchayati Raj	Dipika Pandey Singh	Website
11	Agriculture, Animal Husbandry and Co-operative	Shilpi Neha Tirkey	Website
12	Water Resources	Hafizul Hassan	Website
13	Road Construction	Hemant Soren	Website
14	Energy	Hemant Soren	Website
15	Food, Public Distribution and Consumer Affairs	Irfan Ansari	Website
16	Planning and Development	Radha Krishna Kishore	Website
17	Law	Hemant Soren	Website
18	Transport	Deepak Birua	Website
19	Excise and Prohibition	Yogendra Prasad	Website
20	Information Technology and e-Governance	Hemant Soren	Website
21	Mines and Geology	Hemant Soren	Website
22	Industries	Sanjay Prasad Yadav	Website
23	Forest, Environment and Climate Change	Hemant Soren	Website
24	Labour, Employment, Training and Skill Development	Sanjay Prasad Yadav	Website
25	Women, Child Development and Social Security	Hemant Soren	Website
26	Drinking Water and Sanitation	Yogendra Prasad	Website
27	Building Construction	Hemant Soren	Website
28	Commercial Taxes	Radha Krishna Kishore	Website
29	Tourism, Arts, Culture, Sports and Youth Affairs	Sudivya Kumar	Website
30	Parliamentary Affairs	Radha Krishna Kishore	Website
31	Information and Public Relations	Hemant Soren	Website
32	Rural Works	Dipika Pandey Singh	Website
33	Cabinet Secretariat and Vigilance	Hemant Soren	Website
34	Cabinet Election	K. Ravi Kumar	Website
35	Scheduled Tribe, Scheduled Caste, Minority and Backward Class Welfare	Chamra Linda (excluding Minority Welfare) Hafizul Hassan, Minister of Minority Welfare	Website

== See also ==
- Government of Jharkhand
- Council of Ministers of Jharkhand
- Jharkhand Secretariat
