= Jharkhand Council of Ministers =

Executive branch of the Government of Jharkhand

- Seat of Government: Ranchi

Legislative branch
- Assembly: Jharkhand Legislative Assembly
- Speaker: Rabindra Nath Mahato
- Members in Assembly: 81

Executive branch
- Governor: Santosh Gangwar
- Chief Minister: Hemant Soren
- Chief Secretary: Avinash Kumar

The Jharkhand Council of Ministers is the executive wing of the Government of Jharkhand and is headed by the State's chief minister Hemant Soren, who is the head of government and leader of the state cabinet. The current state council of ministers were sworn in on 28 November 2024, following the 2024 Jharkhand Legislative Assembly election. The term of every executive wing is for 5 years. The council of ministers are assisted by department secretaries attached to each ministry who are from the Jharkhand cadre of the IAS. The chief executive officer responsible for issuing orders on behalf of the government is the chief secretary to the state government, with Avinash Kumar being the current holder of that position.

== Constitutional requirement ==
=== For the Council of Ministers to aid and advise Governor ===
According to Article 163 of the Indian Constitution,

# There shall be a Council of Ministers with the Chief Minister at the head to aid and advise the Governor in the exercise of his function, except in so far as he is by or under this Constitution required to exercise his functions or any of them in his discretion.

1. If any question arises whether any matter is or is not a matter as respects which the Governor is by or under this Constitution required to act in his discretion, the decision of the Governor in his discretion shall be final, and the validity of anything done by the Governor shall not be called in question on the ground that he ought or ought not to have acted in his discretion.
2. The question whether any, and if so what, advice was tendered by Ministers to the Governor shall not be inquired into in any court.

This means that the ministers serve under the pleasure of the governor and he/she may remove them, on the advice of the chief minister, whenever they want.

=== For other provisions as to Ministers ===
According to Article 164 of the Indian Constitution,

# The Chief Minister shall be appointed by the Governor and the other Ministers shall be appointed by the Governor on the advice of the Chief Minister, and the Minister shall hold office during the pleasure of the Governor:
Provided that in the States of Bihar, Madhya Pradesh and Orissa, there shall be a Minister in charge of tribal welfare who may in addition be in charge of the welfare of the Scheduled Castes and backward classes or any other work.

1. The Council of Minister shall be collectively responsible to the Legislative Assembly of the State.
2. Before a Minister enters upon his office, the Governor shall administer to him the oaths of office and of secrecy according to the forms set out for the purpose in the Third Schedule.
3. A Minister who for any period of six consecutive months is not a member of the Legislature of the State shall at the expiration of that period cease to be a Minister.
4. The salaries and allowances of Ministers shall be such as the Legislature of the State may from time to time by law determine and, until the Legislature of the State so determines, shall be a specified in the Second Schedule.

== Chief Minister ==
Like any Indian state, Chief Ministers of Jharkhand is the real head of the government and responsible for state administration. He is the leader of the parliamentary party in the legislature and heads the state cabinet. The current chief minister is Hemant Soren.

== State Cabinet ==
As per the Constitution of India, all portfolios of state government is vested in Chief Minister, who distribute various portfolio to individual ministers whom he nominates to the State Governor. The state governor appoints individual ministers for various portfolios and departments as per advice of Chief Minister and together form the State Cabinet. As the original portfolios are vested with CM, who delegates to others upon his/her wish, actions of individual ministers are part of collective responsibility of the state cabinet and Chief Minister is responsible for actions of each minister. The state cabinet along with Chief Minister, prepares General policy and individual department policy, which will be guiding policy for day-to-day administration of each minister.

== Council of Ministers ==
Sources.

#	Portrait	Minister	Portfolio	Constituency	Tenure		Party
#	Portrait	Minister	Portfolio	Constituency	Took office	Left office	Party
Chief Minister
1		Hemant Soren	Personnel, Administrative Reforms and Rajbhasha; Home (including Prison); School Education and Literacy; Road Construction; Building Construction; Cabinet Secretariat & Vigilance (excluding Parliamentary Affairs)	Barhait	28 November 2024	Incumbent	JMM
Cabinet Ministers
2		Radha Krishna Kishore	Finance; Commercial Tax; Planning & Development; Parliamentary Affairs	Chhatarpur	5 December 2024	Incumbent	INC
3		Sanjay Prasad Yadav	Industry; Labour Employment, Training & Skill Development	Godda	5 December 2024	Incumbent	RJD
4		Deepak Birua	Transport; Revenue, Registration and Land Reforms (Unregistered)	Chaibasa	5 December 2024	Incumbent	JMM
5		Chamra Linda	Scheduled Tribes; Scheduled Castes; Backward Classes (excluding Minority Welfare)	Bishunpur	5 December 2024	Incumbent	JMM
6		Irfan Ansari	Health, Medical Education & Family Welfare; Food, Public Distribution & Consumer Affairs; Disaster Management	Jamtara	5 December 2024	Incumbent	INC
7		Hafizul Hassan	Water Resources; Minority Welfare	Madhupur	5 December 2024	Incumbent	JMM
8		Dipika Pandey Singh	Rural Development; Rural Works; Panchayati Raj	Mahagama	5 December 2024	Incumbent	INC
9		Yogendra Prasad	Drinking Water & Sanitation; Excise & Prohibition	Gomia	5 December 2024	Incumbent	JMM
10		Sudivya Kumar	Urban Development & Housing; Higher & Technical Education; Tourism, Art & Culture, Sports & Youth Affairs	Giridih	5 December 2024	Incumbent	JMM
11		Shilpi Neha Tirkey	Agriculture, Animal Husbandry and Co-operatives	Mandar	5 December 2024	Incumbent	INC

== Oath as the state chief minister/minister ==
I, <Name of Chief Minister/Minister>, do swear in the name of God/solemnly affirm that I will bear true faith and allegiance to the Constitution of India as by law established, that I will uphold the sovereignty and integrity of India, that I will faithfully and conscientiously discharge my duties as a Minister for the State of () and that I will do right to all manner of people in accordance with the Constitution and the law without fear or favour, affection or ill-will.
