= Jharkhand Secretariat =

Government building in Ranchi, India

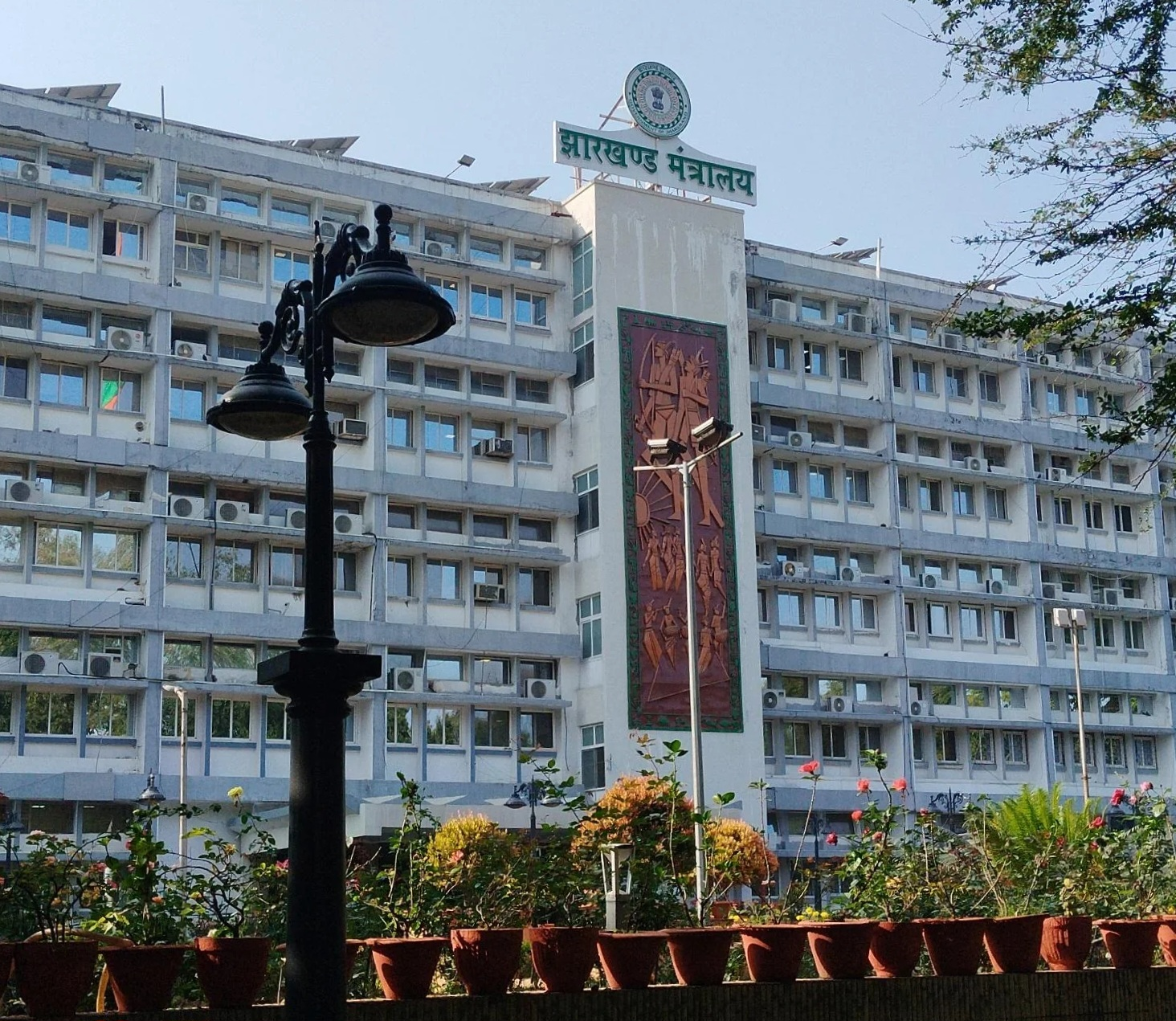
- Interactive map of the Jharkhand Secretariat area
- Alternative names: Project Bhawan

General information
- Type: Government secretariat
- Location: Dhurwa, Ranchi, Jharkhand - 834004, India
- Coordinates: 23°17′39.466″N 85°17′34.688″E
- Current tenants: Hemant Soren, Chief Minister of Jharkhand and the Council of Ministers
- Inaugurated: 15 November 2000
- Owner: Government of Jharkhand

Website
- https://www.jharkhand.gov.in

The Jharkhand Secretariat, also known as Jharkhand Sachivalaya or Project Bhavan is the administrative headquarters of the Government of Jharkhand, housing offices responsible for state governance and administration. It is located in Dhurwa, Ranchi, the capital of Jharkhand. The Secretariat houses the office of the Chief Minister, offices of members of the Council of Ministers, and various departments of the state government.

== History ==
Following the creation of Jharkhand as a separate state from Bihar on 15 November 2000, Ranchi was designated as the state capital and the Secretariat became the administrative headquarters of the newly formed state government. The complex, also known as Project Bhawan, houses the offices of the Chief Minister, ministers and various departments of the Government of Jharkhand.

== Departments ==
No.	Department
1	Personnel, Administrative Reforms and Rajbhasha Department
2	Home, Jail and Disaster Management Department
3	Finance Department
4	Health, Medical Education and Family Welfare Department
5	Higher and Technical Education Department
6	School Education and Literacy Department
7	Urban Development and Housing Department
8	Revenue, Registration and Land Reforms Department
9	Rural Development Department
10	Panchayati Raj Department
11	Agriculture, Animal Husbandry and Co-operative Department
12	Water Resources Department
13	Road Construction Department
14	Energy Department
15	Food, Public Distribution and Consumer Affairs Department
16	Planning and Development Department
17	Law Department
18	Transport Department
19	Excise and Prohibition Department
20	Information Technology and e-Governance Department
21	Mines and Geology Department
22	Industries Department
23	Forest, Environment and Climate Change Department
24	Labour, Employment, Training and Skill Development Department
25	Women, Child Development and Social Security Department
26	Drinking Water and Sanitation Department
27	Building Construction Department
28	Commercial Taxes Department
29	Tourism, Arts, Culture, Sports and Youth Affairs Department
30	Parliamentary Affairs Department
31	Information and Public Relations Department
32	Rural Works Department
33	Cabinet Secretariat and Vigilance Department
34	Cabinet Election Department
35	Scheduled Tribe, Scheduled Caste, Minority and Backward Class Welfare Department

== New Secretariat building ==
A new Secretariat building is planned as part of Ranchi's Core Capital Area. The project was revived after the foundation stone was laid in 2019 and subsequent proposals have revised its location and design. As of 2025, the project remained in the planning stage, with its detailed project report and design being prepared under the Core Capital Area master plan.
