= 6th Jharkhand Assembly =

Indian state legislature since 2024

6th Jharkhand Legislative Assembly

Type
- Type: Unicameral
- Houses: Jharkhand Legislative Assembly
- Term limits: 5 years

History
- Founded: 2024
- Preceded by: 5th Jharkhand Assembly

Leadership
- Speaker: Rabindra Nath Mahato, JMM since 28 November 2024
- Deputy Speaker: vacant
- Leader of the House (Chief Minister): Hemant Soren, JMM since 28 November 2024
- Leader of the Opposition: Babulal Marandi, BJP since 5 March 2025

Structure
- Seats: 81
- Political groups: Government (56) MGB (56): JMM (34); INC (16); RJD (4); CPI(ML)L (2); Official Opposition (24) NDA (24): BJP (21); AJSU (1); LJP(RV) (1); JD(U) (1); Other Opposition (1): JLKM (1)

Elections
- Voting system: First past the post
- Last election: 13 November - 20 November 2024
- Next election: November - December 2029

Meeting place
- Jharkhand Vidhansabha, Kute village, Ranchi

Website
- jharkhandvidhansabha.nic.in

The Members of 6th Legislative Assembly of Jharkhand were elected in the 2024 Jharkhand Legislative Assembly election, with results announced on 23 November 2024.

== Members of Legislative Assembly ==
District	No.	Constituency	Name	Party	Alliance	Remarks
Sahebganj	1	Rajmahal	Mohammad Tajuddin	JMM	MGB	
Sahebganj	2	Borio	Dhananjay Soren	JMM	MGB	
Sahebganj	3	Barhait	Hemant Soren	JMM	MGB	Chief Minister
Pakur	4	Litipara	Hemlal Murmu	JMM	MGB	
Pakur	5	Pakur	Nisat Alam	INC	MGB	
Pakur	6	Maheshpur	Stephen Marandi	JMM	MGB	
Dumka	7	Sikaripara	Alok Kumar Soren	JMM	MGB	
Jamtara	8	Nala	Rabindra Nath Mahato	JMM	MGB	Speaker
Jamtara	9	Jamtara	Irfan Ansari	INC	MGB	Cabinet minister
Dumka	10	Dumka	Basant Soren	JMM	MGB	
Dumka	11	Jama	Louis Marandi	JMM	MGB	
Dumka	12	Jarmundi	Devendra Kunwar	BJP	NDA	
Deoghar	13	Madhupur	Hafizul Hasan	JMM	MGB	Cabinet minister
Deoghar	14	Sarath	Uday Shankar Singh	JMM	MGB	
Deoghar	15	Deoghar	Suresh Paswan	RJD	MGB	
Godda	16	Poreyahat	Pradeep Yadav	INC	MGB	
Godda	17	Godda	Sanjay Prasad Yadav	RJD	MGB	Cabinet minister
Godda	18	Mahagama	Dipika Pandey Singh	INC	MGB	Cabinet minister
Koderma	19	Kodarma	Neera Yadav	BJP	NDA	
Hazaribagh	20	Barkatha	Amit Kumar Yadav	BJP	NDA	
Hazaribagh	21	Barhi	Manoj Kumar Yadav	BJP	NDA	
Ramgarh	22	Barkagaon	Roshan Lal Choudhary	BJP	NDA	
Ramgarh	23	Ramgarh	Mamta Devi	INC	MGB	
Hazaribagh	24	Mandu	Nirmal Mahto	AJSU	NDA	
Hazaribagh	25	Hazaribagh	Pradip Prasad	BJP	NDA	
Chatra	26	Simaria	Kumar Ujjwal	BJP	NDA	
Chatra	27	Chatra	Janardan Paswan	LJP(RV)	NDA	
Giridih	28	Dhanwar	Babulal Marandi	BJP	NDA	Leader of Opposition
Giridih	29	Bagodar	Nagendra Mahto	BJP	NDA	
Giridih	30	Jamua	Manju Kumari	BJP	NDA	
Giridih	31	Gandey	Kalpana Soren	JMM	MGB	
Giridih	32	Giridih	Sudivya Kumar	JMM	MGB	Cabinet minister
Giridih	33	Dumri	Jairam Kumar Mahato	JLKM	None	
Bokaro	34	Gomia	Yogendra Prasad	JMM	MGB	Cabinet minister
Bokaro	35	Bermo	Kumar Jaimangal Singh	INC	MGB	
Bokaro	36	Bokaro	Shwettaa Singh	INC	MGB	
Bokaro	37	Chandankiyari	Umakant Rajak	JMM	MGB	
Dhanbad	38	Sindri	Bablu Mahato	CPI(ML)L	MGB	
Dhanbad	39	Nirsa	Arup Chatterjee	CPI(ML)L	MGB	
Dhanbad	40	Dhanbad	Raj Sinha	BJP	NDA	
Dhanbad	41	Jharia	Ragini Singh	BJP	NDA	
Dhanbad	42	Tundi	Mathura Prasad Mahato	JMM	MGB	
Dhanbad	43	Baghmara	Shatrughan Mahto	BJP	NDA	
East Singhbhum	44	Baharagora	Samir Mohanty	JMM	MGB	
East Singhbhum	45	Ghatsila	Ramdas Soren	JMM	MGB	Died on 15 August 2025
East Singhbhum	45	Ghatsila	Somesh Soren	JMM	MGB	Elected in 2025 by-election
East Singhbhum	46	Potka	Sanjib Sardar	JMM	MGB	
East Singhbhum	47	Jugsalai	Mangal Kalindi	JMM	MGB	
East Singhbhum	48	Jamshedpur East	Purnima Sahu	BJP	NDA	
East Singhbhum	49	Jamshedpur West	Saryu Roy	JD(U)	NDA	
Seraikela Kharsawan	50	Ichagarh	Sabita Mahato	JMM	MGB	
Seraikela Kharsawan	51	Seraikella	Champai Soren	BJP	NDA	
West Singhbhum	52	Chaibasa	Deepak Birua	JMM	MGB	Cabinet minister
West Singhbhum	53	Majhgaon	Niral Purty	JMM	MGB	
West Singhbhum	54	Jaganathpur	Sona Ram Sinku	INC	MGB	
West Singhbhum	55	Manoharpur	Jagat Majhi	JMM	MGB	
West Singhbhum	56	Chakradharpur	Sukhram Oraon	JMM	MGB	
Seraikela Kharsawan	57	Kharsawan	Dashrath Gagrai	JMM	MGB	
Ranchi	58	Tamar	Vikash Kumar Munda	JMM	MGB	
Khunti	59	Torpa	Sudeep Gudhiya	JMM	MGB	
Khunti	60	Khunti	Ram Surya Munda	JMM	MGB	
Ranchi	61	Silli	Amit Mahto	JMM	MGB	
Ranchi	62	Khijri	Rajesh Kachhap	INC	MGB	
Ranchi	63	Ranchi	C. P. Singh	BJP	NDA	
Ranchi	64	Hatia	Navin Jaiswal	BJP	NDA	
Ranchi	65	Kanke	Suresh Kumar Baitha	INC	MGB	
Ranchi	66	Mandar	Shilpi Neha Tirkey	INC	MGB	Cabinet minister
Gumla	67	Sisai	Jiga Susaran Horo	JMM	MGB	
Gumla	68	Gumla	Bhushan Tirkey	JMM	MGB	
Gumla	69	Bishunpur	Chamra Linda	JMM	MGB	Cabinet minister
Simdega	70	Simdega	Bhushan Bara	INC	MGB	
Simdega	71	Kolebira	Naman Bixal Kongari	INC	MGB	
Lohardaga	72	Lohardaga	Rameshwar Oraon	INC	MGB	
Latehar	73	Manika	Ramachandra Singh	INC	MGB	
Latehar	74	Latehar	Prakash Ram	BJP	NDA	
Palamu	75	Panki	Shashi Bhushan Mehta	BJP	NDA	
Palamu	76	Daltonganj	Alok Chaurasiya	BJP	NDA	
Palamu	77	Bishrampur	Naresh Prasad Singh	RJD	MGB	
Palamu	78	Chhatarpur	Radha Krishna Kishore	INC	MGB	Cabinet minister
Palamu	79	Hussainabad	Sanjay Kumar Yadav	RJD	MGB	
Garhwa	80	Garhwa	Satyendra Nath Tiwari	BJP	NDA	
Garhwa	81	Bhawanathpur	Anant Pratap Deo	JMM	MGB	

== Composition ==
Alliance	Political party	No. of MLAs	Leader of the party
Government; MGB; Seats: 56	Jharkhand Mukti Morcha	34	Hemant Soren (Chief Minister)
Government; MGB; Seats: 56	Indian National Congress	16	Keshav Mahto Kamlesh
Government; MGB; Seats: 56	Rashtriya Janata Dal	4	Sanjay Prasad Yadav
Government; MGB; Seats: 56	Communist Party of India (Marxist–Leninist) Liberation	2	Arup Chatterjee
Opposition; NDA; Seats: 24	Bharatiya Janata Party	21	Babulal Marandi (Leader of the Opposition)
Opposition; NDA; Seats: 24	All Jharkhand Students Union	1	Sudesh Mahato
Opposition; NDA; Seats: 24	Janata Dal (United)	1	Saryu Roy
Opposition; NDA; Seats: 24	Lok Janshakti Party (Ram Vilas)	1	Janardan Paswan
Others; Seats: 1	Jharkhand Loktantrik Krantikari Morcha	1	Jairam Kumar Mahato
Total		81	
