= Fourth Hemant Soren ministry =

Government of Jharkhand, India since 2024

- 14th ministry of the State of Jharkhand
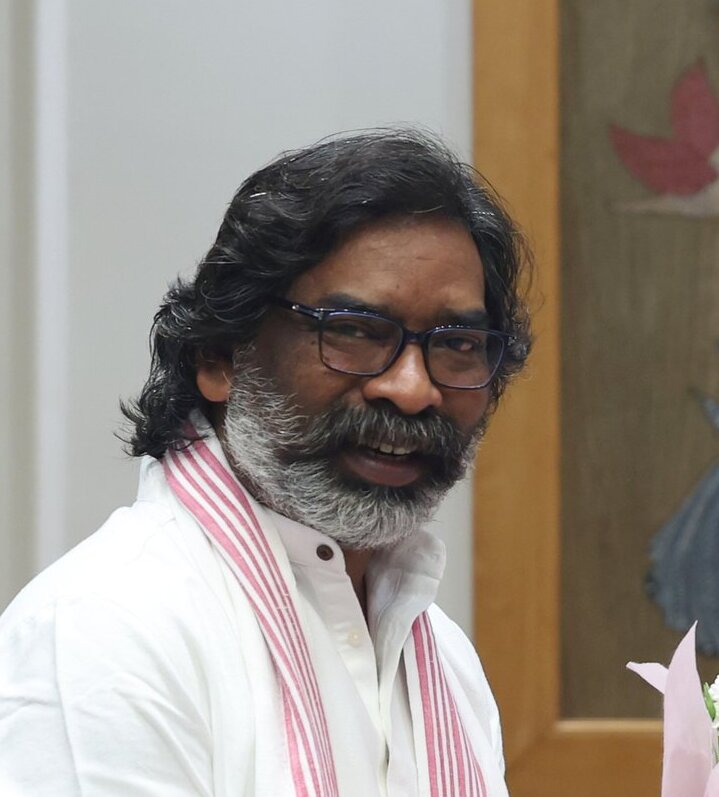
- Hemant Soren; Hon'ble Chief Minister of Jharkhand
- Date formed: 28 November 2024 (21 months ago)

People and organisations
- Governor: Santosh Gangwar
- Chief Minister: Hemant Soren (JMM)
- Chief Minister's history: Rajya Sabha M.P. (2009 – 2010); Deputy CM of Jharkhand (2010 – 2013)
- No. of ministers: 12 (incl. the Chief Minister)
- Member parties: Mahagathbandhan: (Note: CPI(ML)L, a member of the alliance, will not join the ministry as part of their All-India policy.): JMM; INC; RJD
- Status in legislature: Majority government (coalition)
- Opposition party: Bharatiya Janata Party
- Opposition leader: Babulal Marandi

History
- Election: 2024 election
- Legislature term: 6th Assembly (2024-present)
- Predecessor: Third Hemant Soren ministry

Hemant Soren, incumbent Chief Minister of Jharkhand has appointed again in the office after winning the assembly elections in November 2024. The ministry will probably consist of maximum 12 members. Governor Santosh Gangwar administered the oath of office and secrecy to him on 28 November 2024 in Ranchi.

== Background ==
On 23 November 2024, Mahagathbandhan (MGB) won the 2024 assembly election in Jharkhand, with Jharkhand Mukti Morcha (JMM) getting 34 seats. Other members of Mahagathbandhan – Indian National Congress got 16 seats, Rashtriya Janata Dal 4 seats and Communist Party of India (Marxist-Leninist) (Liberation) 2 seats – making total of 56 out of 81 seats in Jharkhand Legislative Assembly.

Soren was unanimously elected as leader of MGB in Jharkhand Legislative Assembly and was designated by Jharkhand Governor Santosh Kumar Gangwar to be appointed as the next Chief Minister.

=== Vote of Confidence ===
A vote of confidence has been scheduled on 9 December during the oath ceremony of Soren. He designated Stephen Marandi as Speaker pro-tem of 6th Jharkhand Assembly.

Vote of confidence (Note: Following parties listed possibly may cast on the day of vote of confidence. Official count date scheduled on 9 December.); Hemant Soren (JMM nominee)
Ballot →	9 December 2024
Required majority →	41 out of 81 seats
Yes: • JMM (33); • INC (16); • RJD (4); • CPI(ML)L (2)	55 / 81
No: • BJP (21); • AJSU (1); • LJP(RV) (1); • JD(U) (1)	24 / 81
Abstention: • JLKM (1)	1 / 81
Status: Passed
Absent: None	0 / 81
Vacant seats	0 / 81
Speaker (pro-tem): • JMM (1)	1 / 81

== Council of Ministers ==
Based on last ministry, Soren will lead the government with Jharkhand Mukti Morcha getting additional 6 ministers, Indian National Congress 4 and Rashtriya Janata Dal a lone minister. The cabinet was later appointed on 5 December.

Portfolio	Minister	Took office	Left office	Party	Remarks
Chief Minister of Jharkhand: Personnel, Administrative Reforms and Official Language; Home (including Prison); Road Construction; Building Construction; Cabinet Secretariat and Vigilance (excluding Parliamentary Affairs); All other portfolios not allocated to any minister	Hemant Soren	28 November 2024	Incumbent	JMM	
Finance; Commercial Tax; Planning and Development; Parliamentary Affairs	Radha Krishna Kishore	5 December 2024	Incumbent	INC	
Revenue; Registration and Land Reforms (non-registration); Transport	Sanjay Prasad Yadav	5 December 2024	Incumbent	RJD	
School Education and Literacy; Registration	Deepak Birua	5 December 2024	Incumbent	JMM	
Scheduled Tribes, Scheduled Castes, and Backward Classes (excluding Minority Welfare)	Chamra Linda	5 December 2024	Incumbent	JMM	
Labour, Planning, Training, and Skill Development; Industries	Ramdas Soren	5 December 2024	15 August 2025	JMM	
Labour, Planning, Training, and Skill Development; Industries	Hemant Soren	15 December 2025	Incumbent	JMM	
Health, Medical Education and Family Welfare; Food, Public Distribution and Consumer Affairs; Disaster Management	Irfan Ansari	5 December 2024	Incumbent	INC	
Water Resources; Minority Welfare	Hafizul Hasan	5 December 2024	Incumbent	JMM	
Rural Development; Rural Work; Panchayati Raj	Dipika Pandey Singh	5 December 2024	Incumbent	INC	
Drinking Water and Sanitation; Excise and Prohibition	Yogendra Prasad	5 December 2024	Incumbent	JMM	
Agriculture, Animal Husbandry and Cooperatives	Shilpi Neha Tirkey	5 December 2024	Incumbent	INC	

== Former Members ==
Sl No.	Name	Constituency	Department	Tenure	Party	Reason
1	Ramdas Soren	Ghatsila	Labour, Planning, Training, and Skill Development Industries	5 December, 2024 – 15 August, 2025	Jharkhand Mukti Morcha	Death
2	Sudivya Kumar	Giridih	Urban Development and Housing; Higher and Technical Education; Tourism, Arts, Culture, Sports & Youth Affairs	5 December, 2024 – 6 September, 2026	Jharkhand Mukti Morcha	Death

== Ministers by Party ==
Representation of cabinet ministers by party
1. Jharkhand Mukti Morcha (60.0%)
2. Indian National Congress (30.0%)
3. Rashtriya Janata Dal (10.0%)

Party	Cabinet Ministers	Total Ministers
Jharkhand Mukti Morcha	7	7
Indian National Congress	4	4
Rashtriya Janata Dal	1	1

== Demographics of the Council of Ministers ==
Administrative Division	District	No. of Ministers	Ministers
Palamu division	Palamu	1	Radha Krishna Kishore
Palamu division	Garhwa		
Palamu division	Latehar		
North Chotanagpur division	Chatra		
North Chotanagpur division	Hazaribagh		
North Chotanagpur division	Koderma		
North Chotanagpur division	Giridih	1	Sudivya Kumar
North Chotanagpur division	Ramgarh		
North Chotanagpur division	Bokaro	1	Yogendra Prasad
North Chotanagpur division	Dhanbad		
South Chotanagpur division	Lohardaga		
South Chotanagpur division	Gumla	1	Chamra Linda
South Chotanagpur division	Simdega		
South Chotanagpur division	Ranchi	1	Shilpi Neha Tirkey
South Chotanagpur division	Khunti		
Kolhan division	West Singhbhum	1	Deepak Birua
Kolhan division	Seraikela Kharsawan		
Kolhan division	East Singhbhum	1	Ramdas Soren
Santhal Pargana division	Jamtara	1	Irfan Ansari
Santhal Pargana division	Deoghar	1	Hafizul Hasan
Santhal Pargana division	Dumka		
Santhal Pargana division	Pakur		
Santhal Pargana division	Godda	2	Sanjay Prasad Yadav; Dipika Pandey Singh
Santhal Pargana division	Sahebganj	1	Hemant Soren (Chief Minister)
Total		12	
