= Government of Jharkhand =

Indian state government

- Emblem of Jharkhand
- Polity type: Parliamentary republic State government
- Part of: Republic of India
- Constitution: Constitution of India
- Formation: 15 November 2000; 25 years ago (Jharkhand Day)

Legislative branch
- Name: Jharkhand Legislative Assembly
- Type: Unicameral
- Meeting place: Vidhan Sabha Bhavan, Ranchi
- Lower house
- Name: Jharkhand Legislative Assembly
- Presiding officer: Rabindra Nath Mahato, Speaker

Executive branch
- Head of state
- Title: Governor
- Currently: Santosh Gangwar
- Appointer: President of India (on advice of Central Government)
- Head of government
- Title: Chief Minister
- Currently: Hemant Soren
- Appointer: Governor
- Cabinet
- Name: Council of Ministers
- Leader: Chief Minister
- Headquarters: Jharkhand Secretariat, Ranchi
- Ministries: 34 ministries

Judicial branch
- Name: Jharkhand High Court
- Courts: Judiciary of India
- Jharkhand High Court
- Chief judge: M. S. Sonak
- Seat: Ranchi

The Government of Jharkhand (abbreviated as GoJ), also known as the Jharkhand Government, is the supreme governing authority of the Indian state of Jharkhand and its 24 districts. It consists of an executive, led by the Governor of Jharkhand, a judiciary and a legislative branch.

Like other states of India, the head of state of Jharkhand is the Governor, appointed by the President of India on the advice of the central government. The post of governor is largely ceremonial. The Chief Minister is the head of government and is vested with most of the executive powers. The Chief Secretary, Avinash Kumar, IAS, serves as the administrative head of the state bureaucracy and the senior most civil servant in the Jharkhand government. Ranchi is the capital of Jharkhand, and houses the Vidhan Sabha (Legislative Assembly) and the secretariat. The Jharkhand High Court, located in Ranchi, has jurisdiction over the whole state.

The present Legislative Assembly of Jharkhand is unicameral, consisting of 81 Member of the Legislative Assembly (M.L.A). Its term is five years, unless dissolved earlier.

== Head Leaders ==
House	Leader	Portrait	Since
Constitutional Posts
Governor of Jharkhand	Santosh Kumar Gangwar		31 July 2024
Chief Minister of Jharkhand	Hemant Soren		28 November 2024
Speaker of the House Jharkhand Legislative Assembly	Rabindra Nath Mahato		6 January 2025
Leader of the House Jharkhand Legislative Assembly	Hemant Soren		28 November 2024
Leader of the Opposition Jharkhand Legislative Assembly	Babulal Marandi		6 March 2025
Chief Justice of Jharkhand High Court	M. S. Sonak		9 January 2026
Chief Secretary of Jharkhand	Avinash Kumar		1 October 2025

== History ==
The Government of Jharkhand was formed on 15 November 2000 following the creation of the state of Jharkhand under the provisions of the Bihar Reorganisation Act, 2000, enacted by the Parliament of India. The state was carved out from the southern districts of Bihar with Ranchi designated as the capital and Dumka as sub-capital. Following the formation of the state, the Government of Jharkhand was constituted in accordance with the Constitution of India to administer the newly created state.

== Council of Ministers ==
Sources.

#	Portrait	Minister	Portfolio	Constituency	Tenure		Party
#	Portrait	Minister	Portfolio	Constituency	Took office	Left office	Party
Chief Minister
1		Hemant Soren	Personnel, Administrative Reforms and Rajbhasha; Home (including Prison); School Education and Literacy; Road Construction; Building Construction; Cabinet Secretariat & Vigilance (excluding Parliamentary Affairs)	Barhait	28 November 2024	Incumbent	JMM
Cabinet Ministers
2		Radha Krishna Kishore	Finance; Commercial Tax; Planning & Development; Parliamentary Affairs	Chhatarpur	5 December 2024	Incumbent	INC
3		Sanjay Prasad Yadav	Industry; Labour Employment, Training & Skill Development	Godda	5 December 2024	Incumbent	RJD
4		Deepak Birua	Transport; Revenue, Registration and Land Reforms (Unregistered)	Chaibasa	5 December 2024	Incumbent	JMM
5		Chamra Linda	Scheduled Tribes; Scheduled Castes; Backward Classes (excluding Minority Welfare)	Bishunpur	5 December 2024	Incumbent	JMM
6		Irfan Ansari	Health, Medical Education & Family Welfare; Food, Public Distribution & Consumer Affairs; Disaster Management	Jamtara	5 December 2024	Incumbent	INC
7		Hafizul Hassan	Water Resources; Minority Welfare	Madhupur	5 December 2024	Incumbent	JMM
8		Dipika Pandey Singh	Rural Development; Rural Works; Panchayati Raj	Mahagama	5 December 2024	Incumbent	INC
9		Yogendra Prasad	Drinking Water & Sanitation; Excise & Prohibition	Gomia	5 December 2024	Incumbent	JMM
10		Sudivya Kumar	Urban Development & Housing; Higher & Technical Education; Tourism, Art & Culture, Sports & Youth Affairs	Giridih	5 December 2024	Incumbent	JMM
11		Shilpi Neha Tirkey	Agriculture, Animal Husbandry and Co-operatives	Mandar	5 December 2024	Incumbent	INC

== Departments ==
No.	Department
1	Personnel, Administrative Reforms and Rajbhasha Department
2	Home, Jail and Disaster Management Department
3	Finance Department
4	Health, Medical Education and Family Welfare Department
5	Higher and Technical Education Department
6	School Education and Literacy Department
7	Urban Development and Housing Department
8	Revenue, Registration and Land Reforms Department
9	Rural Development Department
10	Panchayati Raj Department
11	Agriculture, Animal Husbandry and Co-operative Department
12	Water Resources Department
13	Road Construction Department
14	Energy Department
15	Food, Public Distribution and Consumer Affairs Department
16	Planning and Development Department
17	Law Department
18	Transport Department
19	Excise and Prohibition Department
20	Information Technology and e-Governance Department
21	Mines and Geology Department
22	Industries Department
23	Forest, Environment and Climate Change Department
24	Labour, Employment, Training and Skill Development Department
25	Women, Child Development and Social Security Department
26	Drinking Water and Sanitation Department
27	Building Construction Department
28	Commercial Taxes Department
29	Tourism, Arts, Culture, Sports and Youth Affairs Department
30	Parliamentary Affairs Department
31	Information and Public Relations Department
32	Rural Works Department
33	Cabinet Secretariat and Vigilance Department
34	Cabinet Election Department
35	Scheduled Tribe, Scheduled Caste, Minority and Backward Class Welfare Department

== See also ==
- Elections in Jharkhand
- List of chief secretaries of Jharkhand
- List of departments of the government of Jharkhand
- Jharkhand Council of Ministers
- Jharkhand Police
- List of Rajya Sabha members from Jharkhand
- Jharkhand Police
- Hemant Soren
- Third Hemant Soren ministry
