= List of constituencies of the Jharkhand Legislative Assembly =

Jharkhand Legislative Assembly
- 6th Jharkhand Assembly

Type
- Type: Unicameral
- Term limits: 5 years
- Seats: 81

Elections
- Voting system: First past the post
- Last election: November 2024

Meeting place
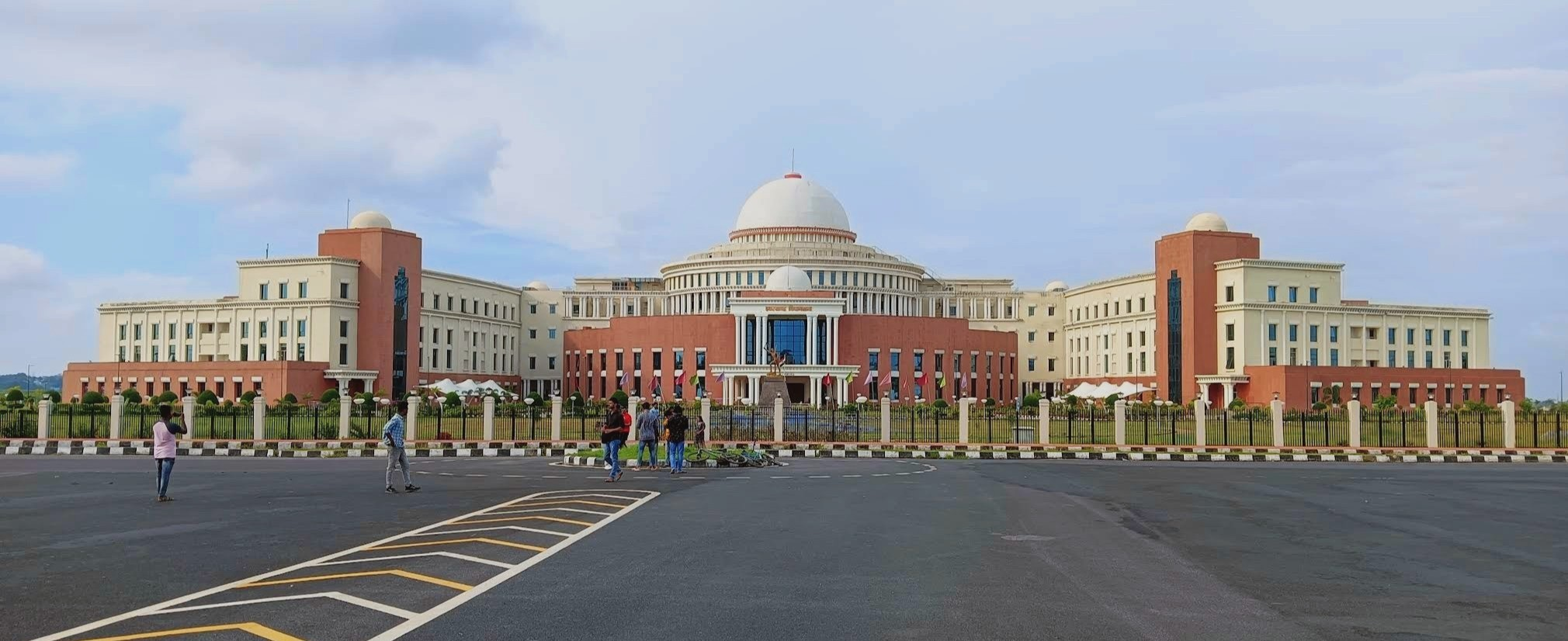
- Vidhan Sabha Bhavan, Ranchi

Website
- vidhansabha.jharkhand.gov.in

Location of Jharkhand (in red) within India

There are 81 constituencies of the Jharkhand Legislative Assembly, the unicameral legislature of the state of Jharkhand in Eastern India. Its seat is at Ranchi, the capital of the state, and it sits for a term of five years unless it is dissolved early. (Note: A Legislative Assembly can be dissolved early, under Article 174 of the Indian Constitution, in a few situations including a hung assembly and the inability of any alliance to form a majority.) Jharkhand is India's fourteenth largest state by population and the fifteenth largest by area.

Constituency boundaries are periodically redrawn by the delimitation commission which tries to keep them as geographically compact areas, and with due consideration to existing boundaries of administrative units. The latest census is used to draw the boundaries and every assembly constituency has to be completely within a parliamentary constituency. Jharkhand's constituencies are single-seat ones, and they each directly elect a representative based on a first past the post election.

Jharkhand was formed in 2000 when the state of Bihar was split after the passage of the Bihar Reorganisation Act, 2000. Its legislative assembly was formed out of the 81 constituencies that were in the new state. Since the independence of India from the United Kingdom in 1947, the Scheduled Castes (SC) and Scheduled Tribes (ST) have been given reservation status, guaranteeing political representation, and the Constitution lays down the general principles of positive discrimination for SCs and STs. When the first delimitation happened in Jharkhand, based on the 2001 census, it was found that the number of seats reserved for the Scheduled Tribes was going to be reduced from 28 to 21. This led to widespread protests in the state, leading to the President of India passing an order which meant that the 2006 delimitation would not be implemented in the state of Jharkhand. According to the 2011 census of India the Scheduled Castes constitute 12.1%, while the Scheduled Tribes constitute 26.2% of the population of the state. The Scheduled Castes have been granted a reservation of 9 seats in the assembly, while 28 constituencies are reserved for candidates of the Scheduled Tribes.

== Constituencies ==
The constituencies of Jharkhand with their reservation status indicated by colour

Reservation
Scheduled Castes (SC)
Scheduled Tribes (ST)

Constituencies of the Jharkhand Legislative Assembly
No.	Name	Reservation	District	Lok Sabha constituency	Electorate (2024)
1	Rajmahal	None	Sahibganj	Rajmahal	355,762
2	Borio	ST	Sahibganj	Rajmahal	284,593
3	Barhait	ST	Sahibganj	Rajmahal	225,885
4	Litipara	ST	Pakur	Rajmahal	217,847
5	Pakur	None	Pakur	Rajmahal	390,206
6	Maheshpur	ST	Pakur	Rajmahal	240,084
7	Sikaripara	ST	Dumka	Dumka	230,739
8	Nala	None	Jamtara	Dumka	242,669
9	Jamtara	None	Jamtara	Dumka	321,367
10	Dumka	ST	Dumka	Dumka	259,784
11	Jama	ST	Dumka	Dumka	225,112
12	Jarmundi	None	Dumka	Godda	271,664
13	Madhupur	None	Deoghar	Godda	368,385
14	Sarath	None	Deoghar	Dumka	316,682
15	Deoghar	SC	Deoghar	Godda	437,732
16	Poreyahat	None	Godda	Godda	317,044
17	Godda	None	Godda	Godda	314,588
18	Mahagama	None	Godda	Godda	334,116
19	Kodarma	None	Kodarma	Kodarma	405,318
20	Barkatha	None	Hazaribagh	Kodarma	388,713
21	Barhi	None	Hazaribagh	Hazaribagh	335,144
22	Barkagaon	None	Ramgarh	Hazaribagh	386,072
23	Ramgarh	None	Ramgarh	Hazaribagh	356,993
24	Mandu	None	Hazaribagh	Hazaribagh	431,452
25	Hazaribagh	None	Hazaribagh	Hazaribagh	439,552
26	Simaria	SC	Chatra	Chatra	377,446
27	Chatra	SC	Chatra	Chatra	427,699
28	Dhanwar	None	Giridih	Kodarma	371,051
29	Bagodar	None	Giridih	Kodarma	387,283
30	Jamua	SC	Giridih	Kodarma	359,336
31	Gandey	None	Giridih	Kodarma	319,910
32	Giridih	None	Giridih	Giridih	304,898
33	Dumri	None	Giridih	Giridih	316,248
34	Gomia	None	Bokaro	Giridih	313,744
35	Bermo	None	Bokaro	Giridih	328,688
36	Bokaro	None	Bokaro	Dhanbad	584,275
37	Chandankiyari	SC	Bokaro	Dhanbad	281,049
38	Sindri	None	Dhanbad	Dhanbad	364,662
39	Nirsa	None	Dhanbad	Dhanbad	331,939
40	Dhanbad	None	Dhanbad	Dhanbad	467,636
41	Jharia	None	Dhanbad	Dhanbad	302,673
42	Tundi	None	Dhanbad	Giridih	319,441
43	Baghmara	None	Dhanbad	Giridih	295,391
44	Baharagora	None	East Singhbhum	Jamshedpur	239,900
45	Ghatsila	ST	East Singhbhum	Jamshedpur	250,295
46	Potka	ST	East Singhbhum	Jamshedpur	311,654
47	Jugsalai	SC	East Singhbhum	Jamshedpur	353,447
48	Jamshedpur East	None	East Singhbhum	Jamshedpur	336,423
49	Jamshedpur West	None	East Singhbhum	Jamshedpur	386,988
50	Ichagarh	None	Seraikela Kharsawan	Ranchi	289,382
51	Seraikella	ST	Seraikela Kharsawan	Singhbhum	369,562
52	Chaibasa	ST	West Singhbhum	Singhbhum	233,698
53	Majhgaon	ST	West Singhbhum	Singhbhum	216,721
54	Jaganathpur	ST	West Singhbhum	Singhbhum	198,634
55	Manoharpur	ST	West Singhbhum	Singhbhum	221,411
56	Chakradharpur	ST	West Singhbhum	Singhbhum	208,581
57	Kharsawan	ST	Seraikela Kharsawan	Khunti	227,503
58	Tamar	ST	Ranchi	Khunti	218,637
59	Torpa	ST	Khunti	Khunti	199,272
60	Khunti	ST	Khunti	Khunti	225,809
61	Silli	None	Ranchi	Ranchi	224,794
62	Khijri	ST	Ranchi	Ranchi	374,945
63	Ranchi	None	Ranchi	Ranchi	379,039
64	Hatia	None	Ranchi	Ranchi	526,189
65	Kanke	SC	Ranchi	Ranchi	481,815
66	Mandar	ST	Ranchi	Lohardaga	379,903
67	Sisai	ST	Gumla	Lohardaga	263,873
68	Gumla	ST	Gumla	Lohardaga	247,953
69	Bishunpur	ST	Gumla	Lohardaga	282,183
70	Simdega	ST	Simdega	Khunti	243,593
71	Kolebira	ST	Simdega	Khunti	210,037
72	Lohardaga	ST	Lohardaga	Lohardaga	287,746
73	Manika	ST	Latehar	Chatra	260,816
74	Latehar	SC	Latehar	Chatra	308,236
75	Panki	None	Palamu	Chatra	326,288
76	Daltonganj	None	Palamu	Palamu	402,626
77	Bishrampur	None	Palamu	Palamu	359,702
78	Chhatarpur	SC	Palamu	Palamu	319,783
79	Hussainabad	None	Palamu	Palamu	323,139
80	Garhwa	None	Garhwa	Palamu	419,614
81	Bhawanathpur	None	Garhwa	Palamu	440,321

== See also ==
- List of parliamentary constituencies in Jharkhand
- List of constituencies of the Bihar Legislative Assembly
