= Third Hemant Soren ministry =

Government of Jharkhand, India in 2024

- Ministry of the State of Jharkhand
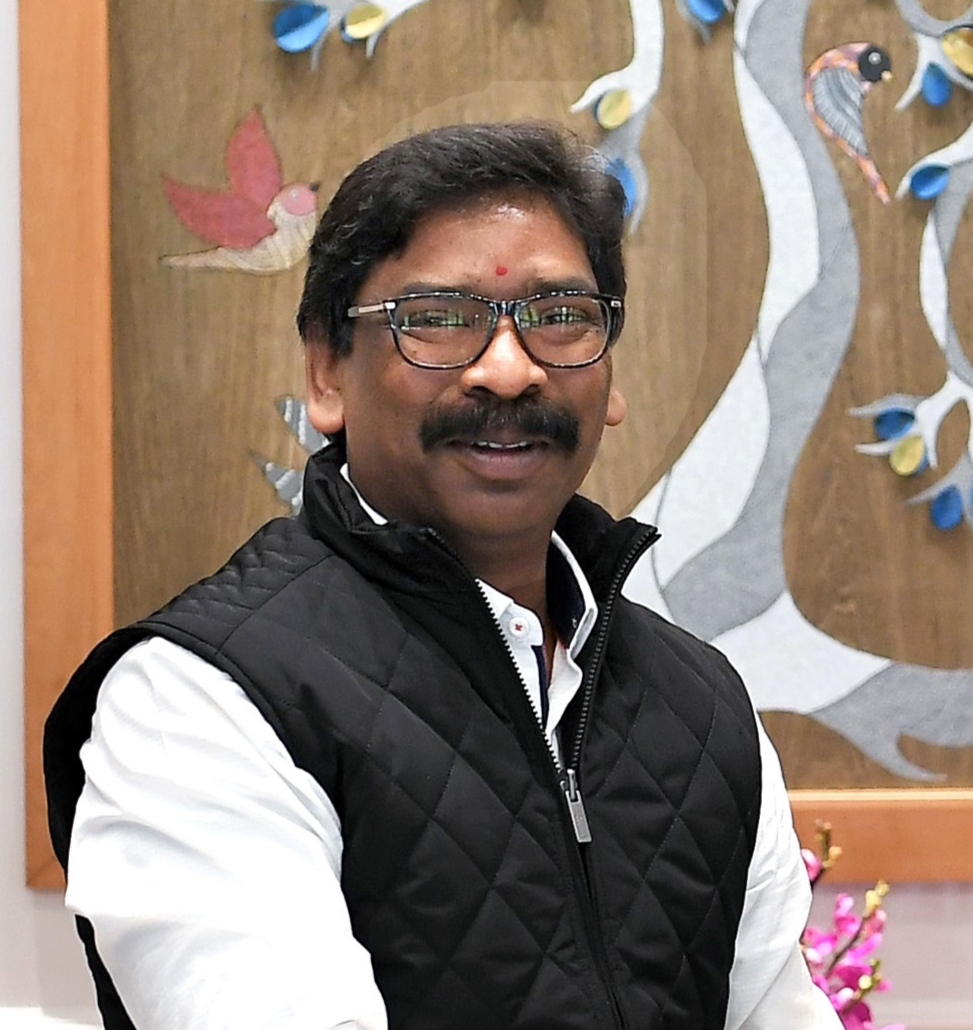
- Hemant Soren; Hon'ble Chief Minister of Jharkhand
- Date formed: 8 July 2024
- Date dissolved: 28 November 2024

People and organisations
- Head of state: Santosh Gangwar
- Head of government: Hemant Soren
- Ministers removed: 1
- Total no. of members: 12 (Including Chief Minister)
- Member parties: Government (48); MGB (48): JMM (29); INC (17); RJD (1); CPI(ML)L (1); Opposition; NDA (32): BJP (26); AJSU (3); NCP (1); IND (2)
- Opposition party: NDA
- Opposition leader: Amar Kumar Bauri , BJP

History
- Outgoing election: 2019
- Legislature term: 5 years (Unless sooner dissolved)
- Predecessor: Champai Soren ministry
- Successor: Fourth Hemant Soren ministry

This is a list of ministers from third Hemant Soren cabinet starting from 8 July 2024 until 28 November 2024.

== Council of Ministers ==
Eleven cabinet ministers were inducted into the cabinet of Chief Minister Hemant Soren after he won the floor test in the Jharkhand Assembly with 45 votes on 8th July 2024.

Portfolio	Minister	Took office	Left office	Party
Chief Minister and also in-charge of: Department of Home (Prisons); Cabinet Secretariat and Vigilance Department (excluding Parliamentary Affairs); And all other departments not allocated to any Minister.	Hemant Soren	8 July 2024	28 November 2024	JMM
Minister of Water Resources Department; Minister of Higher Education; Minister of Technical Education	Champai Soren	8 July 2024	28 August 2024	JMM
Minister of Water Resources Department; Minister of Higher Education; Minister of Technical Education	Ramdas Soren	30 August 2024	28 November 2024	JMM
Minister of Finance; Minister of Planning and Development; Minister of Commercial Tax; Minister of Parliament Affairs	Rameshwar Oraon	8 July 2024	28 November 2024	INC
Minister of Health; Minister of Food, Public Distribution, and Consumer Affairs.	Banna Gupta	8 July 2024	28 November 2024	INC
Minister of Labour, Employment, Training and Skill Development; Minister of Industry	Satyanand Bhogta	8 July 2024	28 November 2024	RJD
Minister of Minority Welfare; Minister of Registrations; Minister of Tourism, Art and Culture, Sports and Youth Affairs	Hafizul Hasan	8 July 2024	28 November 2024	JMM
Minister of Women, Child Development and Social Welfare	Baby Devi	8 July 2024	28 November 2024	JMM
Minister of Scheduled Tribes, Scheduled Castes and Backward Classes Welfare (excluding Minority Welfare); Minister of Transport	Deepak Birua	8 July 2024	28 November 2024	JMM
Minister of Agriculture; Minister of Animal Husbandry; Minister of Disaster Management.	Dipika Pandey Singh	8 July 2024	28 November 2024	INC
Minister of Rural Development; Minister of Rural Works; Minister of Panchayati Raj	Irfan Ansari	8 July 2024	28 November 2024	INC
Minister of Drinking Water and Sanitation	Mithilesh Kumar Thakur	8 July 2024	28 November 2024	JMM
Minister of School Education Minister of Excise	Baidyanath Ram	8 July 2024	28 November 2024	JMM

== Ministers by Party ==
Representation of cabinet ministers by party
1. Jharkhand Mukti Morcha (60.0%)
2. Indian National Congress (30.0%)
3. Rashtriya Janata Dal (10.0%)

Party	Cabinet Ministers	Total Ministers
Jharkhand Mukti Morcha	7	7
Indian National Congress	4	4
Rashtriya Janata Dal	1	1
