= Jharkhand Administrative Service =

Administrative civil service under the State government of Jharkhand

Jharkhand Administrative Service Jhārkhaṇḍa Praśāsanika Sevā
Service Overview
- Founded: 1 April 1937
- State: Jharkhand
- Cadre Controlling Authority: Department of Personnel, Administrative Reforms and Rajbhasha, Government of Jharkhand
- Minister Responsible: Hemant Soren, Chief Minister of Jharkhand and Minister of Department of Personnel, Administrative Reforms & Rajbhasha
- Legal personality: Governmental: Civil service
- Selection: State Civil Services Examination
- Association: Jharkhand PCS Association

Head of the State Civil Services
- Chief Secretary: Avinash Kumar, IAS

Jharkhand Administrative Service (IAST: Jhārkhaṇḍa Praśāsanika Sevā), often abbreviated to as JAS, is the administrative civil service of the Government of Jharkhand comprising Group A and Group B posts. It is also the feeder service for Indian Administrative Service in the state.

PCS officers hold various posts at sub-divisional, district, divisional and state level from conducting revenue administration and maintenance of law and order. The Department of Personnel, Administrative Reforms & Rajbhasha of the Government of Jharkhand is the cadre-controlling authority of the service. Along with the Provincial Police Service (PPS) and the Provincial Forest Service (PFS), the PCS is one of the three feeder services to its respective All India Services.

== JPSC Exam ==
The exam consists of 3 phases:

- Prelims
- Mains
- Interview

== See also ==
- Provincial Civil Service (Uttar Pradesh)
- Jharkhand Public Service Commission
