= Putkar Hembrom =

Indian politician

Putkar Hembrom was an Indian politician and member of the Bharatiya Janata Party. From 2005 to 2009, Hembrom was a member of the Jharkhand Legislative Assembly from the Chaibasa constituency in West Singhbhum district.

He died in June 2023 from COVID-19.
