= Department of Excise and Prohibition (Jharkhand) =

Department of Government of Jharkhand

- उत्पाद एवं मद्य निषेध विभाग

Department overview
- Jurisdiction: Government of Jharkhand
- Headquarters: Utpad Bhawan, Kanke, Ranchi, Jharkhand – 834001
- Minister responsible: Yogendra Prasad, Minister of Department of Excise and Prohibition
- Department executive: Amitabh Kaushal, IAS, Secretary
- Website: www.jharkhand.gov.in/excise

The Department of Excise and Prohibition is a state law enforcement department of the Government of Jharkhand responsible for enforcing laws related to liquor, narcotics, psychotropics and medicines that contain alcohol and narcotics. The department was created when the state of Jharkhand was formed in 2000. The department is also involved in granting licences to the companies, revenue collection from alcohol related activities and plays a crucial role in prevention of illicit liquor manufacture and sale in the state.

== Functions ==
The department's principal functions include:

- Excise regulation, licensing and permits: issuing and granting licences for the manufacture, sale, transport, import, export or storage of alcoholic beverages and monitoring compliance of permits with relevant excise laws and rules.
- Revenue collection: collecting excise duty, permit fees, licence fees and other statutory charges levied on excisable goods and services associated with their production and distribution.
- Prohibition enforcement: implementing prohibition policies in notified areas, particularly in districts or zones with significant Scheduled Tribe populations, preventing the illegal manufacture and sale of intoxicants and regulating or closing sale points when directed under law.
- Public safety and health: taking preventive measures against the manufacture or distribution for adulterated or toxic liquor, enforcing pricing norms to curb overcharging and ensuring adherence to prescribed quality standards to safeguard consumers.

== Ministerial team ==
The department is headed by the Cabinet Minister of Excise and Prohibition, Jharkhand. Civil servants such as the Secretary from IAS background are appointed to support the minister in managing the department and implementing its functions.

Since December 2024, the Minister for Department of Excise and Prohibition is Yogendra Prasad.

== See also ==
- Government of Jharkhand
- Department of Finance (Jharkhand)
