= Department of Transport (Jharkhand) =

Department of Transport, Government of Jharkhand

- परिवहन विभाग

Department overview
- Jurisdiction: Government of Jharkhand
- Headquarters: FFP Building, Dhurwa, Ranchi, Jharkhand
- Minister responsible: Deepak Birua, Minister of Department of Transport
- Department executive: Vipra Bhal, IAS, Secretary (Department of Transport)
- Website: Official website

The Department of Transport is a department of the Government of Jharkhand responsible for the regulation and development of transport in the state. Its functions include vehicle registration, issuance of driving licences, enforcement of transport laws and promotion of road safety. The department also coordinates public transport services related infrastructure.

== Ministerial team ==
The ministerial team is headed by the Cabinet Minister for Transport. Civil servants such as the Secretary are appointed to support the minister in managing the department and implementing its functions. At present the current minister for Jharkhand Transport Department is Deepak Birua.

== See also ==
- Government of Jharkhand
- Ministry of Road Transport and Highways
