= Department of Law (Jharkhand) =

State government department in Jharkhand, India

- विधि विभाग

Department overview
- Jurisdiction: Government of Jharkhand
- Headquarters: Project Bhawan, Dhurwa, Ranchi, Jharkhand
- Minister responsible: Hemant Soren, Minister in Charge
- Department executive: Niraj Kumar Srivastava, H.J.S., Secretary
- Website: Official Website

Department of Law is a department of the Government of Jharkhand. It is the principal legal policy-making and advisory authority of the state government. The department provides legal advice to the government, assists in upholding the rule of law, and is involved in matters relating to access to justice and judicial infrastructure. The department also plays a crucial role in reviewing legislative and policy proposals in the state.

== Ministerial team ==
The department is headed by the Cabinet Minister of Law. Civil servants such as the Principal Secretary are appointed to support the minister in managing the department and implementing its functions. Since December 2024, the minister for Department of Law is Hemant Soren.

== See also ==
- Government of Jharkhand
- Jharkhand High Court
- Ministry of Law and Justice (India)
