= Department of Commercial Taxes (Jharkhand) =

State Department of Jharkhand

Department of Commercial Taxes, Government of Jharkhand
- वाणिज्यिक कर विभाग, झारखंड सरकार

Department overview
- Jurisdiction: Government of Jharkhand
- Headquarters: Project Bhawan, Dhurwa, Ranchi, Jharkhand - 834004
- Minister responsible: Radha Krishna Kishore, Minister of Commercial Taxes
- Department executive: Amitabh Kaushal, IAS, Secretary, (Department of Commercial Taxes)
- Website: Official website

The Department of Commercial Taxes is department of Government of Jharkhand, tasked with assessing, collecting and enforcing taxes on trade, commerce, and related commercial activity in Jharkhand. It administers goods and services tax (GST), value-added tax (VAT), professional tax and other state-levied taxes. The department plays a central role in financing the state's operations, mobilising internal resources and supporting fiscal stability.

== Administrative structure ==
The Administrative section is headed by the Secretary-cum-Commissioner of Commercial Taxes, assisted by Additional, Joint, Deputy and Assistant Commissioners, along with other officers at the headquarters level.

It functions through 5 divisions and 28 circles across the state, supported by VAT audit wings, appellate offices and a state-level Commercial Taxes Tribunal chaired by a judicial officer.

== Ministerial team ==
The Department is headed by the Cabinet Minister of Commercial Taxes, Jharkhand. Civil servants such as the Principal Secretary are appointed to support the minister in managing the department and implementing its functions.

Since December 2024, the Minister for Department of Commercial Taxes is Radha Krishna Kishore.

== See also ==
- Government of Jharkhand
- Department of Finance, Jharkhand
- Income Tax Department
- Central Board of Indirect Taxes and Customs
