= Department of Water Resources (Jharkhand) =

Department of Government of Jharkhand

- जल संसाधन विभाग

Department overview
- Jurisdiction: Government of Jharkhand
- Headquarters: Nepal House, Doranda, Ranchi, Jharkhand – 834002
- Minister responsible: Hafizul Hassan, Minister in Charge
- Department executive: Prashant Kumar, IAS, Secretary
- Website: wrd.jharkhand.gov.in

The Department of Water Resources is a department of Government of Jharkhand responsible for managing and developing water resources in Jharkhand. Its functions include irrigation projects, flood control, maintenance of dams and reservoirs, drainage systems and inter-basin water transfers.

The department plays a key role in expanding irrigation coverage and supporting agriculture across the state, as well as managing water sharing policies with other states. In 2025, the state government approved the creation of a Water Resources Commission to oversee river basin management for better utilisation of water.

== Ministerial team ==
The Department is headed by the Cabinet Minister of Water Resources, Jharkhand. Civil servants such as the Secretary are appointed to support the minister in managing the department and implementing its functions. Since December 2024, the Minister for Department of Water Resources is Hafizul Hassan.

== See also ==
- Government of Jharkhand
- Ministry of Jal Shakti
