= Department of Revenue, Registration and Land Reforms (Jharkhand) =

Government Department of Jharkhand

- राजस्व, निबंधन एवं भूमि सुधार विभाग

Agency overview
- Jurisdiction: Government of Jharkhand
- Headquarters: Project Bhawan, Dhurwa, Ranchi, Jharkhand
- Minister responsible: Deepak Birua, Minister in charge
- Agency executive: Chandra Shekhar, IAS, Secretary
- Website: Official website

The Department of Revenue, Registration and Land Reforms is a key administrative body under the Government of Jharkhand, responsible for the management of land records, land revenue, property and document registration, and implementation of land reforms in the state. It oversees the formulation of policies, acts, rules, and procedures relating to land matters, including land surveys, land use, management of government lands, and registration of legal documents such as property deeds, marriage certificates, and lease or rent agreements.

== Ministerial team ==
The department is headed by the Cabinet Minister of Revenue, Registration and Land Reforms. Civil servants such as the Secretary are appointed to support the minister in managing the department and implementing its functions. Since December 2024, the minister for Department of Revenue, Registration and Land Reforms is Deepak Birua.
