= Department of Rural Works (Jharkhand) =

State government department in Jharkhand, India

- ग्रामीण कार्य विभाग

Department overview
- Jurisdiction: Government of Jharkhand
- Headquarters: FFP Building, Dhurwa, Ranchi, Jharkhand - 834004
- Minister responsible: Dipika Pandey Singh, Minister in Charge
- Department executive: K. Srinivasan, IAS, Secretary
- Website: Official Website

The Department of Rural Works is a department under the Government of Jharkhand that manages the construction and maintenance of rural roads across the state. The department is headed by the Cabinet Minister of Rural Works, assisted by a Secretary. Since December 2024, Dipika Pandey Singh has been serving as the Minister for Rural Works.

== See also ==
- Government of Jharkhand
- Ministry of Rural Development (India)
