= Department of Industries (Jharkhand) =

Government Department of Jharkhand

- उद्योग विभाग

Agency overview
- Jurisdiction: Government of Jharkhand
- Headquarters: Project Bhawan, Dhurwa, Ranchi, Jharkhand - 834004
- Minister responsible: Sanjay Prasad Yadav, Minister in charge
- Agency executive: Arava Rajkamal, IAS, Secretary
- Website: Official website

The Department of Industries is a department of Government of Jharkhand responsible for promoting industrial development and facilitating investment in the state. It plays a key role in framing and implementing policies aimed at attracting industries, supporting entrepreneurship, and creating employment opportunities. The department also coordinates with other state and central agencies to improve infrastructure and provide incentives for industrial growth in Jharkhand.

== Ministerial team ==
The Department is headed by the Jharkhand's Cabinet Minister of Industries. Civil servants such as the Principal Secretary are appointed to support the minister in managing the department and implementing its functions. Since December 2024, the minister for Department of Industries is Sanjay Prasad Yadav.

== See also ==
- Government of Jharkhand
- Ministry of Commerce and Industry (India)
