= Department of Health, Medical Education and Family Welfare (Jharkhand) =

Indian state government department

Department of Health, Medical Education & Family Welfare
- स्वास्थ्य, चिकित्सा शिक्षा एवं परिवार कल्याण विभाग

Department overview
- Jurisdiction: Government of Jharkhand
- Headquarters: Nepal House, Doranda, Ranchi, Jharkhand
- Minister responsible: Irfan Ansari, Minister in Charge
- Department executive: Ajoy Kumar Singh, IAS, Secretary
- Website: www.jharkhand.gov.in/health

The Department of Health, Medical Education & Family Welfare is a department of the Government of Jharkhand. It is responsible for public health, medical services, family welfare and medical education in the state. The department oversees hospitals, health centres, medical colleges and implements state and national health programmes.

== Ministerial team ==
The Department of Health, Medical Education & Family Welfare is headed by a Cabinet Minister who serves as the Minister in Charge. The minister provides political leadership, frames health policy, and represents the department in the state cabinet. Day to day administration is managed by senior officers of the IAS, with the Secretary acting as the chief executive of the department. Irfan Ansari is the present minister in charge of the department.

== See also ==
- Ministry of Health and family welfare
- All India Institute of Medical Sciences, Deoghar
- Rajendra Institute of Medical Sciences
- Mahatma Gandhi Memorial Medical College, Jamshedpur
- Phulo Jhano Medical College and Hospital, Dumka
- Sheikh Bhikhari Medical College
- Shaheed Nirmal Mahto Medical College, Dhanbad
