= Department of Women, Child Development and Social Security, Jharkhand =

Department of Government of Jharkhand

Department of Women, Child Development & Social Security
- महिला, बाल विकास एवं सामाजिक सुरक्षा विभाग

Department overview
- Jurisdiction: Government of Jharkhand
- Headquarters: Project Bhawan, Dhurwa, Ranchi, Jharkhand
- Minister responsible: Hemant Soren, Minister in Charge
- Department executive: Manoj Kumar, IAS, Secretary
- Website: www.jharkhand.gov.in/wcd

The Department of Women, Child Development and Social Security is a government agency in the Indian state of Jharkhand, responsible for formulating and implementing policies and programs aimed at the welfare and empowerment of women, children, and marginalized communities. The department operates under the Government of Jharkhand and plays a pivotal role in promoting social justice and inclusive development.

== Ministerial team ==
The department is headed by the Cabinet Minister of Women, Child Development & Social Security. Civil servants such as the Secretary are appointed to support the minister in managing the department and implementing its functions. Since December 2024, the minister for Department of Women, Child Development and Social Security is Hemant Soren.
