= Department of Rural Development (Jharkhand) =

State government department in Jharkhand, India

- ग्रामीण विकास विभाग

Department overview
- Jurisdiction: Government of Jharkhand
- Headquarters: FFP Building, Dhurwa, Ranchi, Jharkhand
- Minister responsible: Dipika Pandey Singh, Minister in Charge
- Department executive: K. Srinivasan, IAS, Secretary
- Website: Official Website

The Department of Rural Development is a department of the Government of Jharkhand tasked with planning, supervising and implementing rural development programmes in the state. It was established after the formation of the state of Jharkhand in 2000 to coordinate central and state initiatives for rural welfare, livelihood promotion, infrastructure, employment guarantee and other schemes.

== Ministerial team ==
The department is headed by the Cabinet Minister of Rural Development. Civil servants such as the Secretary are appointed to support the minister in managing the department and implementing its functions. Since December 2024, the minister for Department of Rural Development is Dipika Pandey Singh.
