= Department of Food, Public Distribution & Consumer Affairs (Jharkhand) =

Department of Government of Jharkhand

Department of Food, Public Distribution and Consumer Affairs
- खाद्य, सार्वजनिक वितरण एवं उपभोक्ता मामले विभाग

Department overview
- Jurisdiction: Government of Jharkhand
- Headquarters: Ranchi, Jharkhand
- Minister responsible: Irfan Ansari, Minister of Department of Food, Public Distribution and Consumer Affairs
- Department executive: Uma Shankar Singh, IAS, Secretary (Food, Public Distribution and Consumer Affairs)
- Parent department: Government of Jharkhand
- Website: Official website

The Department of Food, Public Distribution and Consumer Affairs is a department under the Government of Jharkhand, responsible for ensuring food security, regulating the public distribution system (PDS), consumer protection, and related welfare measures in the state. The department oversees the procurement, storage, and distribution of food grains, particularly rice and wheat, to eligible households under the National Food Security Act (NFSA) and other state-level schemes.

The department also implements consumer welfare programmes, enforces the Consumer Protection Act, 2019, monitors essential commodities, and prevents black-marketing and hoarding.

== Structure and administration ==
The department is headed by a Cabinet Minister of the Government of Jharkhand. Its administration is managed by the Secretary, an officer of the Indian Administrative Service (IAS), assisted by Additional Secretaries, Joint Secretaries, and Directors handling various divisions such as Food & Civil Supplies, Consumer Affairs and Enforcement.

At present, the current minister of Food, Public Distribution and Consumer Affairs is Irfan Ansari.

== Functions ==
- Implementation of the Public Distribution System (PDS) in Jharkhand.
- Distribution of subsidised food grains to beneficiaries under NFSA, Antyodaya Anna Yojana (AAY) and Green Card holders under. JSFSS.
- Procurement and storage of food grains through the Food Corporation of India (FCI) and state agencies.
- Enforcement of the Essential Commodities Act, 1955 and prevention of black-marketing.
- Protection of consumer rights and redressal of grievances.

== See also ==
- Government of Jharkhand
- Ministry of Consumer Affairs, Food and Public Distribution
