= Department of Energy (Jharkhand) =

Department of Government of Jharkhand

- ऊर्जा विभाग

Department overview
- Jurisdiction: Government of Jharkhand
- Headquarters: Project Bhawan, Dhurwa, Ranchi, Jharkhand, India - 834004
- Minister responsible: Hemant Soren, Minister in Charge
- Department executive: Anjani Kumar Dubey, IAS, Additional Secretary
- Child agencies: JBVNL; JREDA; TVNL
- Website: Official Website

The Department of Energy is department under Government of Jharkhand responsible for overseeing the state's energy sector, including electricity generation, distribution, and renewable energy initiatives. Headquartered in Ranchi, the department plays role in ensuring energy access and infrastructure development across Jharkhand.

== Ministerial team ==
The Department is headed by the Jharkhand's Cabinet Minister of Energy. Civil servants such as the Secretary are appointed to support the minister in managing the department and implementing its functions. Since December 2024, the minister for Department of Energy is Hemant Soren.

== See also ==
- Government of Jharkhand
- Ministry of Power (India)
