= Department of Mines and Geology (Jharkhand) =

Department of Government of Jharkhand

Department of Mines & Geology
- खान एवं भूविज्ञान विभाग

Department overview
- Jurisdiction: Government of Jharkhand
- Headquarters: Yojna Bhawan, Nepal House, Doranda, Ranchi, Jharkhand – 834002
- Minister responsible: Hemant Soren, Minister in Charge
- Department executive: Arava Rajkamal, IAS, Secretary
- Website: minerals.jharkhand.gov.in

The Department of Mines and Geology, is a department of Government of Jharkhand is responsible for the development, regulation and conservation of mineral resources in Jharkhand. The state accounts for about 40% of India’s total mineral reserves, ranking first in coal reserves and holding significant deposits of iron ore, bauxite, copper, limestone and other minerals. The department oversees mineral exploration, grant of concessions, collection of mining revenue and enforcement measures against illegal mining, while promoting sustainable and eco-friendly utilization of resources.

== Ministerial team ==
The Department is headed by the Jharkhand's Cabinet Minister of Mines and Geology. Civil servants such as the Secretary are appointed to support the minister in managing the department and implementing its functions. Since December 2024, the minister for Department of Department of Mines and Geology is Hemant Soren.

== See also ==
- Government of Jharkhand
- Ministry of Mines (India)
