= Department of Information and Public Relations (Jharkhand) =

Government agency

Department of Information and Public Relations, Jharkhand
- सूचना एवं जनसम्पर्क विभाग, झारखण्ड

Agency overview
- Formed: 2000
- Jurisdiction: Government of Jharkhand
- Headquarters: Suchana Bhawan, Ranchi, Jharkhand
- Minister responsible: Hemant Soren, Chief Minister of Jharkhand
- Agency executive: Rajeev Lochan Bakshi, IFS, Special Secretary
- Website: prdjharkhand.in/iprd/index.php

The Department of Information and Public Relations (IPRD) is a department of Government of Jharkhand responsible for facilitating communication between the state government and the public. Established in 2000 following the creation of Jharkhand, the department plays a crucial role in disseminating information about government policies, schemes, and developmental activities to the citizens of the state. IPRD also provides accreditition to journalists and press media in Jharkhand.
