= Department of Panchayati Raj (Jharkhand) =

State government department in Jharkhand, India

- पंचायती राज विभाग

Department overview
- Jurisdiction: Government of Jharkhand
- Headquarters: FFP Building, Dhurwa, Ranchi, Jharkhand
- Minister responsible: Dipika Pandey Singh, Minister in Charge
- Department executive: Manoj Kumar, IAS, Secretary
- Website: Official Website

The Department of Panchayati Raj is a department under Government of Jharkhand responsible for policy, programmes, and administration of the Panchayati Raj Institutions (PRIs) within the state. It works to empower local self-governance at the village, block, and district levels, in accordance with the Constitution of India and the Jharkhand Panchayat Raj Act, 2001.

== Ministerial team ==
The department is headed by the Cabinet Minister of Panchayati Raj. Civil servants such as the Secretary are appointed to support the minister in managing the department and implementing its functions. Since December 2024, the minister for Panchayati Raj is Dipika Pandey Singh.
