= Department of Information Technology and e-Governance (Jharkhand) =

Department of Government of Jharkhand

- सूचना प्रौद्योगिकी और ई-गवर्नेंस विभाग

Department overview
- Jurisdiction: Government of Jharkhand
- Headquarters: Project Bhawan, Dhurwa, Ranchi, Jharkhand – 834004
- Minister responsible: Hemant Soren, Minister in Charge
- Department executive: Pooja Singhal, IAS, Secretary
- Website: www.jharkhand.gov.in/dept-of-information-technology-jharkhand

The Department of Information Technology and e-Governance is a department of Government of Jharkhand responsible for the promotion of information technology, digital infrastructure, and e-governance services in Jharkhand. The department formulates and implements policies to enhance transparency, digital service delivery, and technology-driven governance in the state.

It oversees digital initiatives such as computerization of administrative processes, citizen service portals and connectivity projects through agencies including the Jharkhand Agency for Promotion of Information Technology and the Jharkhand Communication Network Limited.

== Ministerial team ==
Since December 2024, the department is headed by Chief Minister of Jharkhand, Hemant Soren, with Pooja Singhal serving as Secretary.

== See also ==
- Government of Jharkhand
- Ministry of Electronics and Information Technology
