= Department of Labour, Employment, Training and Skill Development (Jharkhand) =

Government Department of Jharkhand

- श्रम, रोजगार, प्रशिक्षण और कौशल विकास विभाग

Agency overview
- Jurisdiction: Government of Jharkhand
- Headquarters: Nepal House, Doranda, Ranchi, Jharkhand - 834002
- Minister responsible: Sanjay Prasad Yadav, Minister in charge
- Agency executive: Jitendra Kumar Singh, IAS, Secretary
- Website: Official website

The Department of Labour, Employment, Training and Skill Development is a department under the Government of Jharkhand, responsible for labor welfare, employment services, vocational training and skill development initiatives in the state. The department implements labor laws, safeguards workers rights and provides social security to employees in both organized and unorganized sectors. It also oversees Industrial Training Institutes (ITIs), skill development programs and employment exchanges to enhance employability and support entrepreneurship among youth.

== Ministerial team ==
The department is headed by the Cabinet Minister of Jharkhand. Civil servants such as the Secretary are appointed to support the minister in managing the department and implementing its functions. Since December 2024, the minister for Department of Labour, Employment, Training and Skill Development is Sanjay Prasad Yadav.

== See also ==
- Government of Jharkhand
- Ministry of Labour and Employment (India)
