= Department of Drinking Water and Sanitation (Jharkhand) =

Department of Government of Jharkhand

- पेयजल एवं स्वच्छता विभाग

Department overview
- Jurisdiction: Government of Jharkhand
- Headquarters: Nepal House, Doranda, Ranchi, Jharkhand – 834002
- Minister responsible: Yogendra Prasad, Minister in Charge
- Department executive: Abu Imran, IAS, Secretary
- Website: www.jharkhand.gov.in/drinking-water

The Department of Drinking Water and Sanitation is a department under the Government of Jharkhand responsible for providing safe drinking water and improving sanitation facilities across the state, particularly in rural areas. The department implements major schemes such as the Jal Jeevan Mission and Swachh Bharat Mission to ensure functional household tap water connections and promote hygiene and sanitation practices. It focuses on improving water quality, establishing treatment plants and developing sustainable rural water supply systems.

The department also works on groundwater management, water quality surveillance and community awareness programmes related to hygiene and conservation.

== Ministerial team ==
The department is headed by the Cabinet Minister of Drinking Water and Sanitation, Jharkhand. Civil servants such as the Principal Secretary are appointed to support the minister in managing the department and implementing its functions. Since December 2024, the Minister for Department of Drinking Water and Sanitation is Yogendra Prasad.

== See also ==
- Government of Jharkhand
- Ministry of Jal Shakti
