= Shilpi Neha Tirkey =

Indian politician

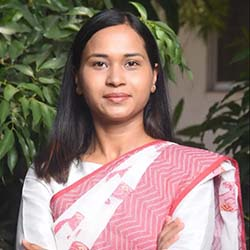
- Tirkey in 2024

Cabinet Minister Government of Jharkhand
- Incumbent
- Assumed office 5 December 2024
- Chief Minister: Hemant Soren
- Governer: Santosh Gangwar
- Ministry & Departments: Agriculture, Animal Husbandry & Co-operative
- Preceded by: Badal Patralekh

Member of the Jharkhand Legislative Assembly
- Incumbent
- Assumed office June 2022
- Preceded by: Bandhu Tirkey
- Constituency: Mandar

Personal details
- Born: Shilpi Neha Tirkey; August 16, 1993 (age 33) Ranchi, Jharkhand, India
- Party: Indian National Congress
- Spouse: Sunny Lakra (Husband)
- Parent: Bandhu Tirkey (Father)
- Education: Christ University (BBA)
- Occupation: Politician

Shilpi Neha Tirkey (born 16 August 1993) is an Indian politician from Jharkhand. She is serving as a member of Jharkhand Legislative Assembly from Mandar since June 2022 representing the Indian National Congress.

== Early life and education ==
Neha Tirkey is from Pandra, Ranchi District, Jharkhand. She is daughter of Bandhu Tirkey. She completed her post graduate diploma in marketing communication in 2015 at St. Xavier's College, Mumbai. Earlier, she did her graduation in 2013 in Business Administration at Christ College, a deemed university in Bangalore. Her husband works as a second engineer in Merchant navy.

== Political career ==
Neha Tirkey became an MLA for the first time winning the by-election for Mandar Assembly constituency in 2022 representing the Indian National Congress. The bypoll was necessitated as her father, Bandhu Tirkey, the sitting MLA was disqualified from the house after he was convicted in a disproportionate assets case. After winning, she became the youngest MLA in the house. Later, she won the 2024 Jharkhand Legislative Assembly election. She polled 1,35,936 votes and defeated her nearest rival, Sunny Toppo of the Bharatiya Janata Party, by a margin of 22,803 votes.

== Position held ==
1.Member of Jharkhand legislative assembly (2022–Present)

2. Cabinet Minister of Agriculture, Animal Husbandry & Co -Operative in Jharkhand Government (2024–Present)
