= Department of Parliamentary Affairs (Jharkhand) =

Government Department of Jharkhand

Department of Parliamentary Affairs, Jharkhand
- संसदीय कार्य विभाग, झारखण्ड

Agency overview
- Jurisdiction: Government of Jharkhand
- Headquarters: Ranchi, Jharkhand, India
- Minister responsible: Radha Krishna Kishore, Minister of Parliamentary Affairs
- Website: Official website

The Department of Parliamentary Affairs is a department of Government of Jharkhand that oversees matters related to the state legislature and ensures coordination between the government and the Jharkhand Legislative Assembly. It assists in conducting legislative sessions and managing official business in the House. Since December 2024, the minister for Jharkhand's Parliamentary Affairs is Radha Krishna Kishore.
