= Radha Krishna Kishore =

Indian politician

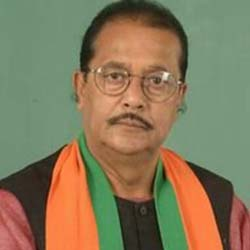

Cabinet Minister Government of Jharkhand
- Incumbent
- Assumed office 5 December 2024
- Chief Minister: Hemant Soren
- Ministry and Departments: Finance; Planning and Development; Commercial Taxes; Parliamentary Affairs
- Preceded by: Rameshwar Oraon

Member of the Jharkhand Legislative Assembly
- Incumbent
- Assumed office 2024
- Preceded by: Pushpa Devi
- Constituency: Chhatarpur
- In office 2014–2019
- Preceded by: Sudha Choudhary
- Succeeded by: Pushpa Devi
- Constituency: Chhatarpur
- In office 2005–2009
- Preceded by: Manoj Kumar
- Succeeded by: Sudha Choudhary
- Constituency: Chhatarpur
- In office 1995–2000
- Preceded by: Laxman Ram
- Succeeded by: Manoj Kumar
- Constituency: Chhatarpur
- In office 1980–1990
- Preceded by: Jorawar Ram
- Succeeded by: Laxman Ram
- Constituency: Chhatarpur

Personal details
- Born: May 27, 1955 (age 71) Palamu, Bihar, India (present-day Jharkhand)
- Party: Indian National Congress (before 2004, 2009 - 2014, 2024 - present)
- Other political affiliations: Rashtriya Janata Dal (2020 - 2024); All Jharkhand Students Union (2019 - 2020); Bharatiya Janata Party (2014 - 2019); Janata Dal (United) (2004 - 2009)

Radha Krishna Kishore (born 27 May 1955) is an Indian politician from Jharkhand. He is a Member of the Jharkhand Legislative Assembly from the Chhatarpur and currently serving as cabinet minister in Government of Jharkhand.

== Political Career ==
He began his political career from Indian National Congress but joined other parties in later years. Previously he was a member of Jharkhand Legislative Assembly from 2005 to 2009 and 2014 to 2019. He was associated with the Janata Dal (United) and All Jharkhand Students Union and joined Bharatiya Janata Party in 2019.

He was minister in Second Munda ministry for a brief period.

Later he joined Indian National Congress and won the 2024 Jharkhand Legislative Assembly election from Chhatarpur constituency.

== Electoral history ==
Year	Constituency	Party	Votes	%	Opponent	Opponent Party	Opponent Votes	%	Result	Margin	Margin %
Bihar Legislative Assembly
1980	Chhatarpur	INC	19,930	56.80	Jorawar Ram	JP(S)	5,758	16.41	Won	14,172	40.39
1985	Chhatarpur	INC	23,595	60.75	Jorawar Ram	LKD	7,053	18.16	Won	16,542	42.59
1990	Chhatarpur	INC	19,218	35.51	Laxman Ram	JD	20,738	38.32	Lost	1,520	2.81
1995	Chhatarpur	INC	27,581	37.45	Laxman Ram	JD	22,105	30.02	Won	5,476	7.43
Jharkhand Legislative Assembly
2000	Chhatarpur	INC	14,038	20.50	Manoj Kumar	RJD	20,864	30.47	Lost	6,826	9.97
2005	Chhatarpur	JD(U)	39,667	39.17	Pushpa Devi	RJD	23,234	22.94	Won	16,433	16.23
2009	Chhatarpur	INC	15,575	17.01	Sudha Chaudhry	JD(U)	25,854	28.23	Lost	10,279	11.22
2014	Chhatarpur	BJP	43,805	30.62	Manoj Kumar	RJD	37,943	26.52	Won	5,862	4.10
2019	Chhatarpur	AJSU	16,018	9.84	Pushpa Devi	BJP	64,127	39.39	Lost	48,109	29.55
2024	Chhatarpur	INC	71,857	36.52	Pushpa Devi	BJP	71,121	36.15	Won	736	0.37
