= Department of School Education & Literacy (Jharkhand) =

State government department in Jharkhand, India

Department of School Education and Literacy
- स्कूली शिक्षा एवं साक्षरता विभाग

Department overview
- Jurisdiction: Government of Jharkhand
- Headquarters: MDI Bhavan, Dhurwa Ranchi, Jharkhand
- Minister responsible: Hemant Soren, Minister in Charge
- Department executive: Uma Shankar Singh, IAS, Secretary
- Website: schooleducation.jharkhand.gov.in

The Department of School Education & Literacy (DoSE&L) is a department of Government of Jharkhand responsible for the formulation, implementation and monitoring of policies related to school education and literacy across the elementary and secondary levels within the state of Jharkhand, India. It aims to achieve equitable access, quality instruction, promotion of tribal languages and literacy, especially among marginalized groups.

== Ministerial team ==
The Department of School Education & Literacy is headed by a Cabinet Minister in the Government of Jharkhand. The portfolio was held by Ramdas Soren until his death on 15 August 2025. Following his demise, Chief Minister Hemant Soren took additional charge of the department until a new minister is appointed.

The administrative functions of the department are overseen by the Principal Secretary, Uma Shankar Singh, IAS, who is responsible for implementation of policies and programmes.

== See also ==
- Government of Jharkhand
- Ministry of Education (India)
