= Chaibasa Assembly constituency =

Constituency of the Jharkhand legislative assembly in India

Coordinates: 22.552°N 85.804°E

Chaibasa
- Constituency No. 52 for the Jharkhand Legislative Assembly

Constituency details
- Country: India
- Region: East India
- State: Jharkhand
- District: West Singhbhum
- Lok Sabha constituency: Singhbhum
- Established: 2000
- Total electors: 207,455
- Reservation: ST

Member of Legislative Assembly
- 5th Jharkhand Legislative Assembly
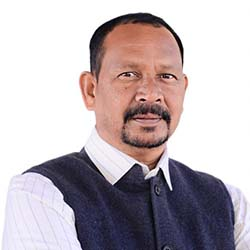
- Incumbent Deepak Birua
- Party: JMM
- Alliance: MGB
- Elected year: 2024

Chaibasa Assembly constituency is an assembly constituency of Chaibasa in the Indian state of Jharkhand.

Most successful parties after separate Jharkhand state.
1. JMM (80.0%)
2. BJP (20.0%)

== Members of the Legislative Assembly ==
Election	Member	Party
Bihar Legislative Assembly
Before 1957: Constituency did not exist
1957	Sukhdeo Manjhi	Jharkhand Party
1962	Harish Chandra Deogam	Janata Party
1967	Bagun Sumbrai	Independent politician
1969	Bagun Sumbrai	Independent politician
1972	Bagun Sumbrai	All India Jharkhand Party
1977	Muktidani Sumbrai	All India Jharkhand Party
1980	Muktidani Sumbrai	Independent politician
1985	Radhey Munda	Bharatiya Janata Party
1990	Hibar Guria	Jharkhand Mukti Morcha
1995	Jawaharlal Banra	Bharatiya Janata Party
2000	Bagun Sumbrai	Indian National Congress
Jharkhand Legislative Assembly
2005	Putkar Hembrom	Bharatiya Janata Party
2009	Deepak Birua	Jharkhand Mukti Morcha
2014	Deepak Birua	Jharkhand Mukti Morcha
2019	Deepak Birua	Jharkhand Mukti Morcha
2024	Deepak Birua	Jharkhand Mukti Morcha

== Election results ==
=== Assembly election 2024 ===
2024 Jharkhand Legislative Assembly election: Chaibasa
Party	Candidate	Votes	%	±%
JMM	Deepak Birua	107,367	64.89%	▲14.51
BJP	Geeta Balmuchu	42,532	25.70%	▼5.70
Independent	Ramesh Balmuchu	4,144	2.50%	New
NCP	Komal Nima Soren	1,633	0.99%	New
Jharkhand Party	Colombus Hasda	1,448	0.88%	New
Independent	Krishan Soy	1,122	0.68%	New
Independent	Sanjay Deogam	1,122	0.68%	New
NOTA	None of the Above	2,528	1.53%	▼0.37
Margin of victory		64,835	39.18%	▲20.22
Turnout		1,65,471	70.81%	▲4.31
Registered electors		2,33,698		▲12.65
JMM hold		Swing	▲14.51	

=== Assembly election 2019 ===
2019 Jharkhand Legislative Assembly election: Chaibasa
Party	Candidate	Votes	%	±%
JMM	Deepak Birua	69,485	50.37%	▲1.67
BJP	J. B. Tubid	43,326	31.41%	▲7.28
JVM(P)	Chandmani Balmuchu	6,808	4.94%	▲2.04
Independent	Pushpa Sinku	4,510	3.27%	New
AITC	Turam Biruly	2,169	1.57%	New
JD(U)	Bimal Kumar Sumbrui	2,164	1.57%	New
Independent	Mangal Singh Sundi	1,544	1.12%	New
NOTA	None of the Above	2,618	1.90%	▼0.49
Margin of victory		26,159	18.96%	▼5.61
Turnout		1,37,944	66.49%	▼6.27
Registered electors		2,07,455		▲6.84
JMM hold		Swing	▲1.67	

=== Assembly election 2014 ===
2014 Jharkhand Legislative Assembly election: Chaibasa
Party	Candidate	Votes	%	±%
JMM	Deepak Birua	68,801	48.70%	▲19.30
BJP	Jyoti Bhramar Tubid	34,086	24.13%	▲5.61
Independent	John Miran Munda	10,983	7.77%	New
INC	Ashok Sundi	8,203	5.81%	▼16.26
JVM(P)	Geeta Sundi	4,096	2.90%	New
JBSP	Sangi Banra	2,744	1.94%	▼8.65
BSP	Sukhmati Barjo	2,422	1.71%	New
NOTA	None of the Above	3,367	2.38%	New
Margin of victory		34,715	24.57%	▲17.24
Turnout		1,41,272	72.76%	▲7.16
Registered electors		1,94,165		▲23.68
JMM hold		Swing	▲19.30	

=== Assembly election 2009 ===
2009 Jharkhand Legislative Assembly election: Chaibasa
Party	Candidate	Votes	%	±%
JMM	Deepak Birua	30,274	29.40%	New
INC	Bagun Sumbrui	22,726	22.07%	▲5.20
BJP	Manoj Leyangi	19,066	18.51%	▼6.82
JBSP	Raj Kishor Boipai	10,911	10.59%	New
Rashtriya Deshaj Party	Mukesh Birua	3,496	3.39%	New
UGDP	Geeta Balmuchu	3,401	3.30%	▼0.05
Independent	Sushil Kumar Purty	2,522	2.45%	New
Margin of victory		7,548	7.33%	▲1.86
Turnout		1,02,983	65.60%	▲6.24
Registered electors		1,56,988		▲0.69
JMM gain from BJP		Swing	▲4.06	

=== Assembly election 2005 ===
2005 Jharkhand Legislative Assembly election: Chaibasa
Party	Candidate	Votes	%	±%
BJP	Putkar Hembrom	23,448	25.33%	▲0.83
Independent	Deepak Birua	18,383	19.86%	New
INC	Bimal Kumar Sumbrui	15,614	16.87%	▼16.15
Independent	Ram Singh Soy	4,618	4.99%	New
LJP	Shiukar Purty	4,472	4.83%	New
Jharkhand Vananchal Congress	Sona Deogam	3,989	4.31%	New
UGDP	Hibar Guria	3,100	3.35%	New
Margin of victory		5,065	5.47%	▼1.85
Turnout		92,559	59.36%	▼1.32
Registered electors		1,55,917		▲7.99
BJP gain from INC		Swing	▼7.69	

=== Assembly election 2000 ===
2000 Bihar Legislative Assembly election: Chaibasa
Party	Candidate	Votes	%	±%
INC	Bagun Sumbrui	28,930	33.02%	New
JMM	Deepak Birua	22,511	25.69%	New
BJP	Jawahar Lal Banra	21,466	24.50%	New
RJD	Gardi Munda	9,400	10.73%	New
CPI	Pardhan Godsora	2,978	3.40%	New
BSP	Turi Sundi	1,101	1.26%	New
Independent	Dula Sundi	898	1.02%	New
Margin of victory		6,419	7.33%	
Turnout		87,615	62.36%	
Registered electors		1,44,386		
INC win (new seat)				

== See also ==
- List of constituencies of the Jharkhand Legislative Assembly
