= Department of Building Construction (Jharkhand) =

State Department of Jharkhand

Department of Building Construction, Government of Jharkhand
- भवन निर्माण विभाग, झारखंड सरकार

Department overview
- Jurisdiction: Government of Jharkhand
- Headquarters: Project Bhawan, Dhurwa, Ranchi, Jharkhand - 834004
- Minister responsible: Hemant Soren, Minister of Building Construction
- Department executive: Arava Rajkamal, IAS, Secretary, (Department of Building Construction)
- Website: https://bcd.jharkhand.gov.in

The Department of Building Construction is a state department under Government of Jharkhand responsible for planning, designing, constructing, renovating and maintaining government buildings across Jharkhand, including residential and non-residential offices.

Prior to 1982, the functions of Building Construction, Road Construction and Rural Engineering were carried out under the Public Works Department (PWD). Following a Cabinet Secretariat memorandum on 16 March 1982, they were reorganized into independent departments, which now manage infrastructure in their respective domains.

== Ministerial team ==
The Department is headed by the Cabinet Minister of Building Construction, Government of Jharkhand. Civil servants such as the Secretary are appointed to support the minister in managing the department and implementing its functions.

Since December 2024, the Minister for Department of Building Construction is Hemant Soren.

== See also ==
- Government of Jharkhand
- Ministry of Housing and Urban Affairs
