= Department of Cabinet Secretariat and Vigilance (Jharkhand) =

State government department of Jharkhand

- कैबिनेट सचिवालय और सतर्कता विभाग

Department overview
- Jurisdiction: State of Jharkhand
- Headquarters: Project Building, Dhurwa, Ranchi, Jharkhand - 834005; 23.29417°N 85.29299°E
- Minister responsible: Hemant Soren, Chief Minister of Jharkhand and Minister of Cabinet Secretariat and Vigilance
- Department executive: Vandana Dadel, IAS, Additional Chief Secretary
- Parent department: Government of Jharkhand
- Website: Official website

The Department of Cabinet Secretariat and Vigilance is department of Government of Jharkhand that assists the state cabinet in decision making and inter departmental coordination. It handles administrative reforms and cabinet affairs, while its vigilance wing monitors corruption and misconduct to ensure transparency and accountability in government operations.

== Ministerial team ==
The Department is headed by the Cabinet Minister of Secretariat and Vigilance. Civil servants such as the Additional Chief Secretary or Principal Secretary are appointed to support the minister in managing the department and implementing its functions.

Since December 2024, the Minister for Department of Cabinet Secretariat and Vigilance is Hemant Soren.
