= Bishunpur Assembly constituency =

Constituency of the Jharkhand legislative assembly in India

Coordinates: 23.375°N 84.380°E

Bishunpur
- Constituency No. 69 for the Jharkhand Legislative Assembly

Constituency details
- Country: India
- Region: East India
- State: Jharkhand
- District: Gumla
- Lok Sabha constituency: Lohardaga
- Established: 2000
- Total electors: 235,502
- Reservation: ST

Member of Legislative Assembly
- 5th Jharkhand Legislative Assembly
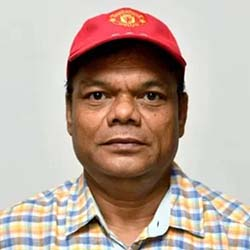
- Incumbent Chamra Linda
- Party: JMM
- Alliance: MGB
- Elected year: 2024

Bishunpur Assembly constituency is an assembly constituency in the Indian state of Jharkhand.

== Members of the Legislative Assembly ==
| Election | Name | Party |
Bihar Legislative Assembly
Before 1977: Constituency did not exist
| 1977 | Kartik Oraon | Indian National Congress |
| 1980 | Bhukhla Bhagat | Indian National Congress |
| 1985 | Bhukhla Bhagat | Indian National Congress |
| 1990 | Ramesh Oraon | Bharatiya Janata Party |
| 1995 | Bhukhla Bhagat | Indian National Congress |
| 2000 | Chandresh Oraon | Bharatiya Janata Party |
Jharkhand Legislative Assembly
| 2005 | Chandresh Oraon | Bharatiya Janata Party |
| 2009 | Chamra Linda | Rashtriya Kalyan Paksha |
| 2014 | Chamra Linda | Jharkhand Mukti Morcha |
| 2019 | Chamra Linda | Jharkhand Mukti Morcha |
| 2024 | Chamra Linda | Jharkhand Mukti Morcha |

== Election results ==
=== Assembly election 2024 ===
2024 Jharkhand Legislative Assembly election: Bishunpur
| Party | Candidate | Votes | % | ±% |
|---|---|---|---|---|
| JMM | Chamra Linda | 100,336 | 49.64% | ▲0.45 |
| BJP | Sameer Oraon | 67,580 | 33.43% | ▼5.18 |
| Independent | Jagarnath Oraon | 10,899 | 5.39% | New |
| Independent | Shiv Kumar Bhagat | 5,473 | 2.71% | New |
| JLKM | Yashoda Devi | 2,449 | 1.21% | New |
| CPI | Mahendra Oraon | 1,741 | 0.86% | New |
| Independent | Mahatma Oraon | 1,619 | 0.80% | New |
| NOTA | None of the Above | 6,187 | 3.06% | ▲0.26 |
| Margin of victory | | 32,756 | 16.20% | ▲5.63 |
| Turnout | | 2,02,140 | 71.63% | ▲1.83 |
| Registered electors | | 2,82,183 | | ▲19.82 |
| JMM hold | | Swing | ▲0.45 | |

=== Assembly election 2019 ===
2019 Jharkhand Legislative Assembly election: Bishunpur
| Party | Candidate | Votes | % | ±% |
|---|---|---|---|---|
| JMM | Chamra Linda | 80,864 | 49.19% | ▲11.24 |
| BJP | Ashok Oraon | 63,482 | 38.61% | ▲8.03 |
| JVM(P) | Mahatma Oraon | 5,005 | 3.04% | New |
| Independent | Mohan Bhagat | 2,450 | 1.49% | New |
| Independent | Fulmani Bara | 2,214 | 1.35% | New |
| Independent | Pushpa Panna | 1,101 | 0.67% | New |
| Bhartiya Tribal Party | Bhineshwar Bhagat | 942 | 0.57% | New |
| NOTA | None of the Above | 4,599 | 2.80% | ▼0.33 |
| Margin of victory | | 17,382 | 10.57% | ▲3.21 |
| Turnout | | 1,64,401 | 69.81% | ▲2.89 |
| Registered electors | | 2,35,502 | | ▲7.08 |
| JMM hold | | Swing | ▲11.24 | |

=== Assembly election 2014 ===
2014 Jharkhand Legislative Assembly election: Bishunpur
| Party | Candidate | Votes | % | ±% |
|---|---|---|---|---|
| JMM | Chamra Linda | 55,851 | 37.95% | ▲32.95 |
| BJP | Samir Oraon | 45,008 | 30.58% | ▲11.06 |
| Independent | Ashok Oraon | 11,994 | 8.15% | New |
| INC | Boby Bhagat | 11,781 | 8.00% | ▼15.08 |
| Independent | Sukhair Bhagat | 3,733 | 2.54% | New |
| CPI | Vishwanath Oraon | 3,190 | 2.17% | New |
| Communist Party of India (Marxist Leninist) Liberation | Amon Lakra | 2,867 | 1.95% | ▲0.12 |
| NOTA | None of the Above | 4,605 | 3.13% | New |
| Margin of victory | | 10,843 | 7.37% | ▼6.53 |
| Turnout | | 1,47,180 | 66.92% | ▲2.39 |
| Registered electors | | 2,19,936 | | ▲18.05 |
| JMM gain from Rashtriya Kalyan Paksha | | Swing | ▲0.96 | |

=== Assembly election 2009 ===
2009 Jharkhand Legislative Assembly election: Bishunpur
| Party | Candidate | Votes | % | ±% |
|---|---|---|---|---|
| Rashtriya Kalyan Paksha | Chamra Linda | 44,461 | 36.98% | New |
| INC | Shiv Kumar Bhagat | 27,751 | 23.08% | ▲8.48 |
| BJP | Bhikhari Bhagat | 23,470 | 19.52% | ▲3.42 |
| JMM | Uday Bhagat | 6,007 | 5.00% | New |
| Independent | Sukhnath Bhagat | 4,818 | 4.01% | New |
| Communist Party of India (Marxist Leninist) Liberation | Suresh Bhagat | 2,196 | 1.83% | New |
| AJSU | Rameshwari Devi | 2,190 | 1.82% | ▲0.13 |
| Margin of victory | | 16,710 | 13.90% | ▲13.52 |
| Turnout | | 1,20,215 | 64.53% | ▲1.48 |
| Registered electors | | 1,86,306 | | ▼21.49 |
| Rashtriya Kalyan Paksha gain from BJP | | Swing | ▲20.88 | |

=== Assembly election 2005 ===
2005 Jharkhand Legislative Assembly election: Bishunpur
| Party | Candidate | Votes | % | ±% |
|---|---|---|---|---|
| BJP | Chandresh Oraon | 24,099 | 16.11% | ▼24.88 |
| Independent | Chamra Linda | 23,530 | 15.73% | New |
| INC | Shiv Kumar Bhagat | 21,846 | 14.60% | ▼19.33 |
| Independent | Sukhnath Bhagat | 6,777 | 4.53% | New |
| RJD | Ajit Tigga | 4,897 | 3.27% | ▼6.38 |
| CPI | Anil Kumar Asur | 2,860 | 1.91% | New |
| AJSU | Ramesh Oraon | 2,537 | 1.70% | New |
| Margin of victory | | 569 | 0.38% | ▼6.67 |
| Turnout | | 1,49,610 | 63.05% | ▲29.23 |
| Registered electors | | 2,37,299 | | ▲47.03 |
| BJP hold | | Swing | ▼24.88 | |

=== Assembly election 2000 ===
2000 Bihar Legislative Assembly election: Bishunpur
| Party | Candidate | Votes | % | ±% |
|---|---|---|---|---|
| BJP | Chandresh Oraon | 22,369 | 40.99% | New |
| INC | Bhukhla Bhagat | 18,519 | 33.93% | New |
| RJD | Sukhair Bhagat | 5,270 | 9.66% | New |
| JMM | Pravin Kumar Oraon | 4,082 | 7.48% | New |
| BSP | Ajit Tigga | 971 | 1.78% | New |
| Communist Party of India (Marxist Leninist) Liberation | Bishwanath Oraon | 914 | 1.67% | New |
| NCP | Jai Prakash Bhagat | 766 | 1.40% | New |
| Margin of victory | | 3,850 | 7.05% | |
| Turnout | | 54,575 | 35.35% | |
| Registered electors | | 1,61,396 | | |
| BJP win (new seat) | | | | |

== See also ==
- List of constituencies of the Jharkhand Legislative Assembly
