= Department of Planning and Development (Jharkhand) =

Government Department of Jharkhand

- योजना एवं विकास विभाग

Agency overview
- Jurisdiction: Government of Jharkhand
- Headquarters: Ranchi, Jharkhand, India
- Minister responsible: Radha Krishna Kishore, Minister in charge
- Agency executive: Mukesh Kumar, IAS, Secretary
- Website: Official website

The Department of Planning and Development is a government department under the Government of Jharkhand, responsible for formulating and implementing policies related to economic planning, development, and statistical analysis in the state. The department plays a key role in coordinating inter-departmental activities, preparing the state’s annual plans and monitoring the progress of various development programs. It also oversees the functioning of the Directorate of Economics and Statistics, which is tasked with collecting and analyzing data to inform policy decisions.
