= Department of Agriculture, Animal Husbandry & Co-operative (Jharkhand) =

Department of Government of Jharkhand

- कृषि, पशुपालन और सहकारिता विभाग

Department overview
- Jurisdiction: Government of Jharkhand
- Headquarters: Nepal House, Doranda, Ranchi, Jharkhand
- Minister responsible: Shilpi Neha Tirkey, Minister in Charge
- Department executive: Aboobacker Siddique P, IAS, Secretary
- Website: Official Website

The Department of Agriculture, Animal Husbandry & Co-operative is a department under the Government of Jharkhand. It is responsible for implementing policies and programmes related to agriculture, horticulture, soil conservation, animal husbandry, dairy development, fisheries, and cooperative societies in the state.

The department provides support to farmers and rural communities through extension services, training, veterinary care, input subsidies, and cooperative structures. Its functions also include promoting sustainable farming practices, expanding irrigation facilities, improving seed and fertilizer supply, strengthening market linkages, and developing allied sectors such as livestock, dairy and fisheries to enhance rural livelihoods and food security.

== Ministerial team ==
The department is headed by the Cabinet Minister of Jharkhand. Civil servants such as the Secretary are appointed to support the minister in managing the department and implementing its functions. Since December 2024, the minister for Department of Department of Agriculture, Animal Husbandry & Co-operative is Shilpi Neha Tirkey.
