= Department of Personnel, Administrative Reforms & Rajbhasha, Jharkhand =

Jharkhand State Government department

Department of Personnel, Administrative Reforms & Rajbhasha
- कार्मिक, प्रशासनिक सुधार तथा राजभाषा विभाग

Department overview
- Jurisdiction: Government of Jharkhand
- Headquarters: Project Building, Dhurwa, Ranchi, Jharkhand; 23.29420°N 85.29300°E
- Minister responsible: Hemant Soren, Chief Minister of Jharkhand and Minister of Department of Personnel, Administrative & Rajbhasha
- Department executive: Prawin Kumar Toppo, IAS, Secretary (Personnel, Administrative & Rajbhasha)
- Website: Official website

The Department of Personnel, Administrative Reforms and Rajbhasha (DoP) is a department of the Government of Jharkhand. It is responsible for personnel management, cadre control, administrative reforms, vigilance, and implementation of the state's official language policy (Rajbhasha).

It controls cadre management of officers belonging to the Indian Administrative Service, Indian Police Service, and Indian Forest Service serving in Jharkhand, along with state civil services like Jharkhand Administrative Service. The department also oversees postings, transfers, service rules, disciplinary matters, and acts as the nodal agency for administrative reforms, e-governance and vigilance.

In addition, the department promotes and implements the use of Hindi as the official language in state government offices under the Rajbhasha policy.

== Functions ==
- Cadre management of IAS, IPS and IFS officers serving in Jharkhand and also state civil service of JAS.
- Service rules, appointments, transfers, postings and disciplinary matters of state officers.
- Administrative reforms, e-governance initiatives, and transparency measures
- Vigilance and monitoring of government functioning
- Promotion and implementation of Rajbhasha (Hindi) in government departments.

== Important officials ==
The Chief Minister of Jharkhand, Hemant Soren, is the minister in charge of the Department of Personnel, Administrative Reforms and Rajbhasha since December 2024.

The department's administration is headed by the Secretary, who is an officer of the Indian Administrative Service (IAS). The Secretary is assisted by an Additional Secretary and Joint Secretaries. Since March 2023, Prawin Kumar Toppo is the Secretary of Personnel, Administrative Reforms and Rajbhasa Department of Government of Jharkhand.

List of important Officials:

Name	Designation
Hemant Soren	Hon’ble Minister
Prawin Kumar Toppo, IAS	Secretary
Om Prakash Sah	Additional Secretary
Asif Hassan	Joint Secretary
Amar Kumar	Joint Secretary
Chintu Dorai Buru	Joint Secretary

== Location ==
The headquarters of the department is located at Project Building, Dhurwa, Ranchi.

== See also ==
- Government of Jharkhand
- Indian Administrative Service
- Indian Police Service
- Indian Forest Service
- Jharkhand Administrative Service
- Department of Personnel and Training (India)
