= Department of Road Construction (Jharkhand) =

Department of Government of Jharkhand

- पथ निर्माण विभाग

Department overview
- Jurisdiction: Government of Jharkhand
- Headquarters: Project Bhawan, Dhurwa, Ranchi, Jharkhand, India - 834004
- Minister responsible: Hemant Soren, Minister in Charge
- Department executive: Sunil Kumar, IAS, Principal Secretary
- Website: Official Website

The Department of Road Construction (RCD) is a government agency under the Government of Jharkhand responsible for the planning, development and maintenance of the state's road infrastructure. Headquartered in Ranchi, the department manages the construction and maintenance of state highways, major district roads and other rural village roads within Jharkhand.

== Ministerial team ==
The Department is headed by the Jharkhand's Cabinet Minister of Road Construction. Civil servants such as the Principal Secretary are appointed to support the minister in managing the department and implementing its functions. Since December 2024, the minister for Department of Road Construction is Hemant Soren.

== See also ==
- Government of Jharkhand
- Ministry of Road Transport and Highways
