= Department of Finance (Jharkhand) =

State of Jharkhand Finance Department

Department of Finance, Government of Jharkhand
- वित्त विभाग, झारखंड सरकार
- Emblem of Jharkhand

Department overview
- Jurisdiction: Government of Jharkhand
- Headquarters: Project Bhawan, Dhurwa, Ranchi, Jharkhand
- Minister responsible: Radha Krishna Kishore, Minister of Department of Finance
- Department executive: Prashant Kumar, IAS, Secretary, (Department of Finance)
- Parent Department: Government of Jharkhand
- Child agencies: Directorate of Treasury & Institutional Finance; Directorate of Pension And Accounts; Directorate of Audit
- Website: finance.jharkhand.gov.in

The Department of Finance is a department of the Government of Jharkhand. It is responsible for managing the state’s public finances, including preparation and presentation of the annual budget, mobilisation of revenue, and ensuring financial discipline. The department also oversees treasuries, accounts, institutional finance, and allocation of resources to government programmes. Its headquarters is located at Project Bhawan, Dhurwa, Ranchi.

== Functions ==
The functions of the Department of Finance, Government of Jharkhand, include:

- Formulating rules and regulations for financial administration and accounting, including preparation of financial codes and interpreting questions of financial nature.
- Preparing the Annual Finance Statement and Supplementary Expenditure Statement, managing re-appropriation, savings, and reversion in departmental budgets.
- Liaising with the State Finance Commission and arranging funds for the implementation of its recommendations.
- Managing state revenue collection, public debt, borrowings, and loans given by the state government.
- Overseeing service conditions of government employees relating to pay, allowances, pay revisions, pay fixation, and related administrative financial matters.
- Providing financial advice to other departments, coordinating scheme implementation, and monitoring institutional and non-budgetary finance sources.

== Ministerial team ==
The Department of Finance is headed by the Cabinet Minister for Finance in the Government of Jharkhand. Since December 2024, Radha Krishna Kishore holds the portfolio of Finance Minister.

The administrative head of the department is the Finance Secretary, who is supported by Special Secretaries and other senior officials. Since January 2024, Prashant Kumar is serving as Secretary of Jharkhand's Finance Department.

== List of Finance Ministers ==
S. No	Name	Party	Term			Chief Minister	
1.	Mrigendra Pratap Singh	BJP	15 November 2000	13 March 2003	2 years, 118 days	Marandi	Babulal Marandi
1.	Mrigendra Pratap Singh	BJP	18 March 2003	2 March 2005	1 year, 349 days	Munda I	Arjun Munda
2.	Raghubar Das	BJP	12 March 2005	14 September 2006	1 year, 186 days	Munda II	Arjun Munda
3.	Stephen Marandi	Independent	18 September 2006	27 August 2008	1 year, 344 days	Koda	Madhu Koda
3.	Stephen Marandi	Independent	27 August 2008	19 January 2009	145 days	Shibu II	Shibu Soren
(2).	Raghubar Das	BJP	30 December 2009	1 June 2010	153 days	Shibu III	Shibu Soren
4.	Hemant Soren	JMM	11 September 2010	18 January 2013	2 years, 129 days	Munda III	Arjun Munda
5.	Rajendra Prasad Singh	INC	13 July 2013	28 December 2014	1 year, 168 days	Soren I	Hemant Soren
(2).	Raghubar Das	BJP	28 December 2014	29 December 2019	5 years, 1 day	Das	Raghubar Das
6.	Rameshwar Oraon	INC	29 December 2019	5 December 2024	4 years, 342 days	Soren II	Hemant Soren
6.	Rameshwar Oraon	INC	29 December 2019	5 December 2024	4 years, 342 days	Champai	Champai Soren
6.	Rameshwar Oraon	INC	29 December 2019	5 December 2024	4 years, 342 days	Soren III	Hemant Soren
7.	Radha Krishna Kishore	INC	5 December 2024	Incumbent	1 year, 289 days	Soren IV	Hemant Soren

== See also ==
- Government of Jharkhand
- Ministry of Finance (India)
- Jharkhand Gazette
