= Gomia Assembly constituency =

Constituency of the Jharkhand legislative assembly in India

Coordinates: 23.802°N 85.829°E

Gomia
- Constituency No. 34 for the Jharkhand Legislative Assembly

Constituency details
- Country: India
- Region: East India
- State: Jharkhand
- District: Bokaro
- Lok Sabha constituency: Giridih
- Established: 2000
- Total electors: 275,139
- Reservation: None

Member of Legislative Assembly
- 5th Jharkhand Legislative Assembly
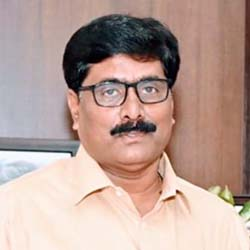
- Incumbent Yogendra Prasad
- Party: JMM
- Alliance: MGB
- Elected year: 2024

Gomia Assembly constituency is an assembly constituency in the Indian state of Jharkhand.

== Members of the Legislative Assembly ==
Election	Member	Party
Bihar Legislative Assembly
1952	Kamakhya Narain Singh	Chota Nagpur Santhal Parganas Janata Party
1957-77: Constituency did not exist
1977	Chhatru Ram Mahto	Janata Party
1980	Chhatru Ram Mahto	Bharatiya Janata Party
1985	Madhava Lal Singh	Independent politician
1990	Madhava Lal Singh	Independent politician
1995	Chhatru Ram Mahto	Bharatiya Janata Party
2000	Madhava Lal Singh	Independent politician
Jharkhand Legislative Assembly
2005	Chhatru Ram Mahto	Bharatiya Janata Party
2009	Madhav Lal Singh	Indian National Congress
2014	Yogendra Prasad	Jharkhand Mukti Morcha
2018^	Babita Devi	Jharkhand Mukti Morcha
2019	Lambodar Mahto	All Jharkhand Students Union
2024	Yogendra Prasad	Jharkhand Mukti Morcha

^by-election

== Election results ==
=== Assembly election 2024 ===
2024 Jharkhand Legislative Assembly election: Gomia
Party	Candidate	Votes	%	±%
JMM	Yogendra Prasad	95,170	42.19	▲10.06
JLKM	Puja Kumari	59,077	26.19	New
AJSU	Lambodar Mahto	54,508	24.16	▼13.74
Independent	Prakash Lal Singh	2,926	1.30	New
Independent	Chitranjan Saw	1,894	0.84	New
Independent	Md Israfil	1,823	0.81	New
Independent	Madan Kumar Saw	1,581	0.70	New
NOTA	None of the Above	2,781	1.23	▲0.38
Margin of victory		36,093	16.00	▲10.23
Turnout		2,25,569	71.90	▲2.99
Registered electors		3,13,744		▲14.03
JMM gain from AJSU		Swing	▲4.29	

=== Assembly election 2019 ===
2019 Jharkhand Legislative Assembly election: Gomia
Party	Candidate	Votes	%	±%
AJSU	Lambodar Mahto	71,859	37.90	▲3.87
JMM	Babita Devi	60,922	32.13	▼2.67
Independent	Madhav Lal Singh	26,103	13.77	New
BJP	Lakshman Kumar Nayak	18,011	9.50	▼14.66
Independent	Dinesh Kumar Munda	1,896	1.00	New
Independent	Nikhil Kumar Soren	1,699	0.90	New
Independent	Gulam Rabbani	1,433	0.76	New
NOTA	None of the Above	1,609	0.85	▼1.36
Margin of victory		10,937	5.77	▲5.00
Turnout		1,89,588	68.91	▲3.84
Registered electors		2,75,139		▲2.88
AJSU gain from JMM		Swing	▲3.10	

=== Assembly by-election 2018 ===
2018 Jharkhand Legislative Assembly by-election: Gomia
Party	Candidate	Votes	%	±%
JMM	Babita Devi	60,552	34.80	▼20.45
AJSU	Lambodar Mahto	59,211	34.03	New
BJP	Madhav Lal Singh	42,038	24.16	▼9.90
Independent	Nikhil Kumar Soren	1,996	1.15	New
Independent	Hemlal Mahto	1,423	0.82	New
Jharkhand Mukti Morcha (Ulgulan)	Umesh Kumr Mahto	1,385	0.80	New
Independent	Gautam Tiwari	886	0.51	New
NOTA	None of the Above	3,851	2.21	New
Margin of victory		1,341	0.77	▼20.42
Turnout		1,74,001	63.62	▼4.58
Registered electors		2,67,433		▲5.21
JMM hold		Swing	▼20.45	

=== Assembly election 2014 ===
2014 Jharkhand Legislative Assembly election: Gomia
Party	Candidate	Votes	%	±%
JMM	Yogendra Prasad	97,799	55.25	▲47.44
BJP	Madhav Lal Singh	60,285	34.06	New
INC	Vimal Kumar Jaiswal	3,828	2.16	▼21.23
Independent	Jageshwar Thakur	2,563	1.45	New
Independent	Mahanand Kumar Mahto	2,311	1.31	New
JVM(P)	Manoj Gupta	2,010	1.14	New
BSP	Ajay Renjan	1,305	0.74	▼5.75
NOTA	None of the Above	2,181	1.23	New
Margin of victory		37,514	21.19	▲15.03
Turnout		1,77,020	69.64	▲6.17
Registered electors		2,54,191		▲19.65
JMM gain from INC		Swing	▲31.86	

=== Assembly election 2009 ===
2009 Jharkhand Legislative Assembly election: Gomia
Party	Candidate	Votes	%	±%
INC	Madhav Lal Singh	31,540	23.39	New
AJSU	Yogendra Prasad	23,237	17.23	New
Independent	Sabi Devi	19,023	14.11	New
Independent	Dev Narayan Prajapati	13,012	9.65	New
JMM	Chhatru Ram Mahto	10,531	7.81	▼2.39
BSP	Salini Devi	8,745	6.49	▼12.54
CPI	Iftekhar Mehmood	5,893	4.37	New
Margin of victory		8,303	6.16	▲3.32
Turnout		1,34,839	63.47	▲6.38
Registered electors		2,12,454		▼0.02
INC gain from BJP		Swing	▼5.19	

=== Assembly election 2005 ===
2005 Jharkhand Legislative Assembly election: Gomia
Party	Candidate	Votes	%	±%
BJP	Chhattu Ram Mahto	34,669	28.58	▲1.13
Independent	Madhav Lal Singh	31,227	25.74	New
BSP	Deo Narayan Prasad	23,083	19.03	New
JMM	Lalu Soren	12,374	10.20	▲4.89
Independent	Sanjay Kumar Mahto	3,555	2.93	New
CPI(M)	Shyam Sundar Mahto	3,294	2.72	New
Independent	Jagdish Mahto	3,065	2.53	New
Margin of victory		3,442	2.84	▼9.85
Turnout		1,21,315	57.09	▲4.73
Registered electors		2,12,505		▲16.28
BJP gain from Independent		Swing	▼11.55	

=== Assembly election 2000 ===
2000 Bihar Legislative Assembly election: Gomia
Party	Candidate	Votes	%	±%
Independent	Madhav Lal Singh	38,404	40.13	New
BJP	Chhattu Ram Mahto	26,262	27.44	New
INC	Izrail	18,821	19.67	New
JMM	Dhani Ram Manjhi	5,080	5.31	New
CPI	Panchanan Mahato	3,764	3.93	New
RJD	Gyanesar Yadav	1,728	1.81	New
SP	Shyamanand Nayak	1,280	1.34	New
Margin of victory		12,142	12.69	
Turnout		95,695	53.20	
Registered electors		1,82,760		
Independent win (new seat)				

== See also ==
- Vidhan Sabha
- List of states of India by type of legislature
- Jharkhand Legislative Assembly
