= Giridih Assembly constituency =

Assembly constituency in the Indian state of Jharkhand

Coordinates: 24.190°N 86.304°E

Giridih
- Constituency No. 32 for the Jharkhand Legislative Assembly

Constituency details
- Country: India
- Region: East India
- State: Jharkhand
- District: Giridih
- Lok Sabha constituency: Giridih
- Established: 1951
- Total electors: 264,814
- Reservation: None

Member of Legislative Assembly
- 6th Jharkhand Legislative Assembly
- Incumbent Vacant

Giridih Assembly constituency is an assembly constituency in the Indian state of Jharkhand.

== Members of the Legislative Assembly ==
Election	Name	Party
Bihar Legislative Assembly
Before 1957: see Giridih cum Dumri constituency
1957	Kamakhya Narain Singh	Chota Nagpur Santhal Parganas Janata Party
1957	Hemlal Pragnait	Chota Nagpur Santhal Parganas Janata Party
1962	Raghunandan Ram	Indian National Congress
1967	Raghunandan Ram	Indian National Congress
1969	Chaturanan Mishra	Communist Party of India
1972	Chaturanan Mishra	Communist Party of India
1977	Chaturanan Mishra	Communist Party of India
1980	Urmila Debi	Indian National Congress
1985	Om Lal Azad	Communist Party of India
1990	Jyotindra Prasad	Indian National Congress
1995	Chandra Mohan Prasad	Bharatiya Janata Party
2000	Chandra Mohan Prasad	Bharatiya Janata Party
Jharkhand Legislative Assembly
2005	Munna Lal	Jharkhand Mukti Morcha
2009	Nirbhay Kumar Shahabadi	Jharkhand Vikas Morcha
2014	Nirbhay Kumar Shahabadi	Bharatiya Janata Party
2019	Sudivya Kumar	Jharkhand Mukti Morcha
2024	Sudivya Kumar	Jharkhand Mukti Morcha

== Election results ==
=== Assembly election 2024 ===
2024 Jharkhand Legislative Assembly election: Giridih
Party	Candidate	Votes	%	±%
JMM	Sudivya Kumar	94,042	45.28%	▼2.91
BJP	Nirbhay Kumar Shahabadi	90,204	43.43%	▲4.71
JLKM	Navin Anand	10,787	5.19%	New
Independent	Sunaina Pathak	2,635	1.27%	New
Independent	Rameshwar Dusadh	2,163	1.04%	New
AIFB	Ajeet Ray	1,540	0.74%	New
NOTA	None of the Above	2,004	0.96%	▼0.69
Margin of victory		3,838	1.85%	▼7.62
Turnout		2,07,682	68.12%	▲4.74
Registered electors		3,04,898		▲15.14
JMM hold		Swing	▼2.91	

=== Assembly election 2019 ===
2019 Jharkhand Legislative Assembly election: Giridih
Party	Candidate	Votes	%	±%
JMM	Sudivya Kumar	80,871	48.19%	▲16.48
BJP	Nirbhay Kumar Shahabadi	64,987	38.72%	▲0.38
JVM(P)	Chunnu Kant	6,903	4.11%	▼13.68
Independent	Mohammad Lallu	2,493	1.49%	New
LJP	Upendra Kumar Sharma	2,026	1.21%	New
Independent	Shyam Prasad Barnwal	1,533	0.91%	New
BSP	Sikandar Ali	1,272	0.76%	▼0.87
NOTA	None of the Above	2,773	1.65%	▲0.01
Margin of victory		15,884	9.46%	▲2.84
Turnout		1,67,822	63.37%	▼0.52
Registered electors		2,64,814		▲12.91
JMM gain from BJP		Swing	▲9.85	

=== Assembly election 2014 ===
2014 Jharkhand Legislative Assembly election: Giridih
Party	Candidate	Votes	%	±%
BJP	Nirbhay Kumar Shahabadi	57,450	38.34%	▲21.66
JMM	Sudivya Kumar	47,517	31.71%	▲24.17
JVM(P)	Babu Lal Marandi	26,665	17.79%	▼8.45
INC	Ruma Singh	2,998	2.00%	New
BSP	Nageshwar Das	2,436	1.63%	▼7.74
JD(U)	Tribhuwan Dayal	2,050	1.37%	New
Marxist Co-Ordination	Govind Kumar Yadav	1,930	1.29%	New
NOTA	None of the Above	2,457	1.64%	New
Margin of victory		9,933	6.63%	▲0.15
Turnout		1,49,846	63.89%	▲10.55
Registered electors		2,34,535		▲14.11
BJP gain from JVM(P)		Swing	▲12.10	

=== Assembly election 2009 ===
2009 Jharkhand Legislative Assembly election: Giridih
Party	Candidate	Votes	%	±%
JVM(P)	Nirbhay Kumar Shahabadi	28,771	26.24%	New
Independent	Munna Lal	21,669	19.77%	New
BJP	Chandra Mohan Prasad	18,283	16.68%	▼6.83
AJSU	Vinod Kumar	11,737	10.71%	New
BSP	Manoj Kumar Sahu	10,267	9.37%	▲1.62
JMM	Sudivya Kumar	8,272	7.55%	▼22.54
Independent	Vivakar Pandey	2,443	2.23%	New
Margin of victory		7,102	6.48%	▼0.10
Turnout		1,09,629	53.34%	▲2.36
Registered electors		2,05,538		▼1.17
JVM(P) gain from JMM		Swing	▼3.84	

=== Assembly election 2005 ===
2005 Jharkhand Legislative Assembly election: Giridih
Party	Candidate	Votes	%	±%
JMM	Munna Lal	31,895	30.08%	▲16.56
BJP	Chandra Mohan Prasad	24,920	23.50%	▼4.20
RJD	Nirbhay Kumar Shahabadi	21,029	19.83%	▼6.72
BSP	Manoj Kumar Sahu	8,214	7.75%	▲6.06
LJP	Jyotindra Prasad	4,392	4.14%	New
Independent	Jageshwar Singh	3,168	2.99%	New
SP	Md. Kasim Noshad Ali	2,771	2.61%	New
Margin of victory		6,975	6.58%	▲5.43
Turnout		1,06,024	50.98%	▲2.44
Registered electors		2,07,962		▲13.13
JMM gain from BJP		Swing	▲2.38	

=== Assembly election 2000 ===
2000 Bihar Legislative Assembly election: Giridih
Party	Candidate	Votes	%	±%
BJP	Chandra Mohan Prasad	24,722	27.71%	New
RJD	Nirbhay Kumar Shahabadi	23,697	26.56%	New
INC	Jyotindra Prasad	14,804	16.59%	New
JMM	Irshad Ahmad	12,069	13.53%	New
Independent	Jageshwar Singh	5,409	6.06%	New
CPI	Omi Lal Azad	3,197	3.58%	New
BSP	Shunil Kumar	1,506	1.69%	New
Margin of victory		1,025	1.15%	
Turnout		89,230	49.19%	
Registered electors		1,83,826		
BJP win (new seat)				

== See also ==
- Vidhan Sabha
- List of states of India by type of legislature
