= Sudivya Kumar =

Indian politician (1970–2026)

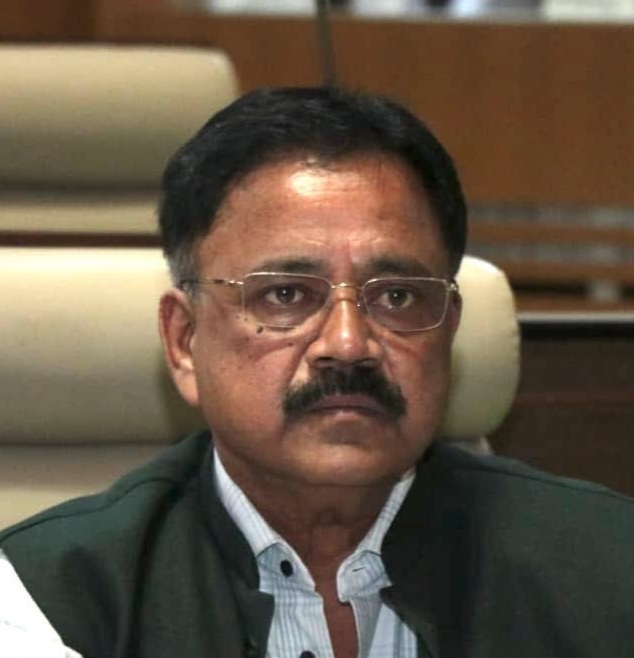
- Kumar in 2019

Cabinet Minister Government of Jharkhand
- In office 5 December 2024 – 6 September 2026
- Chief Minister: Hemant Soren
- Governor: Santosh Gangwar
- Ministry & Department Responsibility: Higher and Technical Education; Urban Development and Housing; Tourism, Art & Culture, Sports and Youth Affairs
- Preceded by: Hemant Soren

Member of Jharkhand Legislative Assembly
- In office 20 December 2019 – 6 September 2026
- Preceded by: Nirbhay Kumar Shahabadi
- Constituency: Giridih

Personal details
- Born: Sudivya Kumar; 26 July 1970 Giridih, Bihar, India (present day Giridih, Jharkhand, India)
- Died: 6 September 2026 (aged 56) Giridih, Jharkhand, India
- Party: Jharkhand Mukti Morcha
- Spouse: Shweta Sharma
- Children: 3 (2 daughters, 1 son)
- Parent: Shambhu Nath (father)
- Occupation: Politician

Sudivya Kumar (26 July 1970 – 6 September 2026) was an Indian politician who served as a cabinet minister in the Government of Jharkhand and as a member of the Jharkhand Legislative Assembly from the Giridih Assembly constituency. A member of the Jharkhand Mukti Morcha, he was elected in 2019 and re-elected in 2024. He served as a cabinet minister from December 2024 until his death in September 2026.

Kumar died from a cardiac arrest in the early hours of 6 September 2026, at a private hospital in Giridih, Jharkhand, at the age of 56.
