= Sanjay Prasad Yadav =

Indian politician

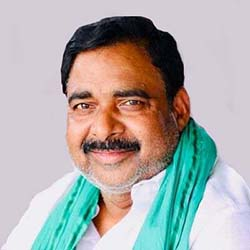

Cabinet Minister, Government of Jharkhand
- Incumbent
- Assumed office 5 December 2024
- Chief Minister: Hemant Soren

Member of the Jharkhand Legislative Assembly
- Incumbent
- Assumed office 23 November 2024
- Constituency: Godda
- In office 23 December 2009 – 23 December 2014
- Preceded by: Manohar Kumar Tekariwal
- Succeeded by: Amit Kumar Mandal

Personal details
- Born: Vill+P.O- Dharmodih P.S-Mahagama Dist-Godda, Jharkhand
- Party: Rashtriya Janata Dal
- Parent: Chandrashekhar Yadav
- Education: HSC in 2003
- Occupation: Agriculturist
- Profession: Politician; Business

Sanjay Prasad Yadav is an Indian politician and a member of Jharkhand Legislative Assembly of India. He represents the Godda constituency in the Godda district of Jharkhand. He was elected in 2009 as a member of Rashtriya Janata Dal and 2019 Jharkhand Legislative Assembly. He also contested from this constituency but lost to Amit Kumar Mandal by very short margin.
