= Chamra Linda =

Indian politician

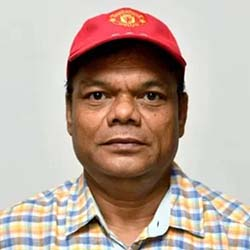

Member of Jharkhand Legislative Assembly for Bishunpur
- Incumbent
- Assumed office 23 December 2009
- Preceded by: Chandresh Oraon
- Constituency: Bishunpur

Personal details
- Born: 1969 or 1970 (age 55–56)
- Party: Jharkhand Mukti Morcha
- Other political affiliations: Independent(2024); Rashtriya Kalyan Paksha (2005-2014)
- Parent: Late Bigal Linda (Father)

Chamra Linda is an Indian politician and social activist based on Jharkhand. He is politically affiliated with the Jharkhand Mukti Morcha (JMM) and a member to the Jharkhand legislative assembly from Bishunpur constituency since 2009. He is also current Minister of Scheduled Tribe, Scheduled Caste, and Backward Class Welfare in the Government of Jharkhand.

== Early life and education ==
Born and raised in the Bishunpur block of Gumla district, Jharkhand, Chamra Linda belongs to a tribal family. He enrolled at Birla Institute of Technology, Mesra for engineering, but discontinued his studies to prioritise his family's welfare. Linda later earned a Bachelor of Arts degree from Ranchi College in 1993.

== Political career ==
Linda has been focused on policy-making to uplift marginalised communities. His efforts focus on education, health, and livelihood initiatives designed to improve the socio-economic conditions of the state's disadvantaged groups. Under his leadership, programs addressing land rights, traditional craftsmanship preservation, and employment opportunities have seen notable progress. in Chamra Linda is the first minister of Jharkhand who offered prayers as per the Sarna customs while assuming charge in the Jharkhand Ministry.

Electoral history
Election	House	Constituency	Party	Votes	%	Result
2004	Loksabha	Lohardaga (ST)	Independent	58,947	12.64	Lost
2009	Loksabha	Lohardaga (ST)	Independent	136,345	26.1	Lost
2014	Loksabha	Lohardaga (ST)	AITC	118,355	18.17	Lost
2024	Loksabha	Lohardaga (ST)	Independent	45,998	4.76	Lost
2005	Jharkhand Legislative Assembly	Bishunpur (ST)	Independent	23,530	24.24	Lost
2009	Jharkhand Legislative Assembly	Bishunpur (ST)	Rashtriya Kalyan Paksha	44,461	36.98	Won
2009	Jharkhand Legislative Assembly	Mandar (ST)	Rashtriya Kalyan Paksha	27,073	17.49	Lost
2014	Jharkhand Legislative Assembly	Bishunpur (ST)	JMM	55,851	37.95	Won
2019	Jharkhand Legislative Assembly	Bishunpur (ST)	JMM	80,864	49.19	Won
2024	Jharkhand Legislative Assembly	Bishunpur (ST)	JMM	100,336	49.64	Won
