= Irfan Ansari =

Indian politician

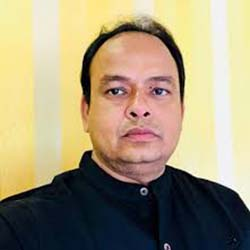
- Ansari in 2021

Cabinet Minister Government of Jharkhand
- Incumbent
- Assumed office 8 July 2024
- Governor: Santosh Gangwar
- Chief Minister: Hemant Soren
- Ministry and Departments: Health, Medical Education and Family Welfare.; Food, Public Distribution and Consumer Affairs.; Disaster Management

Member of the Jharkhand Legislative Assembly
- Incumbent
- Assumed office 25 November 2014
- Preceded by: Bishnu Prasad Bhaiya
- Constituency: Jamtara

Personal details
- Born: Irfan Ansari; 17 January 1975 (age 51) Deoghar, Jharkhand, India
- Party: Indian National Congress
- Parent: Furqan Ansari (father)
- As of 25 November 2014

Irfan Ansari is an Indian politician and member of the Indian National Congress. Ansari is a member of the Jharkhand Legislative Assembly from the Jamtara constituency in Jamtara district in 2014 and 2019 and 2024.

His father Furqan Ansari was also a Member of Legislative assembly from Jamtara constituency of Jharkhand being an Indian National Congress candidate. He is the current cabinet minister for the Minister of Rural Development, Minister of Rural Works and Minister of Panchayati Raj in Government of Jharkhand.
