= Deepak Birua =

Indian politician

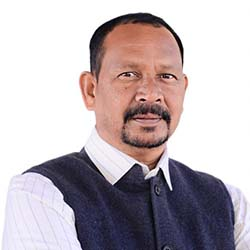

Cabinet Minister, Government of Jharkhand
- Incumbent
- Assumed office 5 December 2024
- Minister: Minister of Revenue; Minister of Registration and Land Reforms; Minister of Transport
- Governor: Santosh Gangwar
- Chief Minister: Hemant Soren

Member of the Jharkhand Legislative Assembly
- Incumbent
- Assumed office 2009
- Preceded by: Putkar Hembrom
- Constituency: Chaibasa

Cabinet Minister, Government of Jharkhand
- In office 16 February 2024 - 28 November 2024
- Minister: Minister of Scheduled Tribes, Scheduled Castes and Backward Classes Welfare; Minister of Transport
- Governor: C. P. Radhakrishnan; Santosh Gangwar
- Chief Minister: Champai Soren; Hemant Soren

Personal details
- Party: Jharkhand Mukti Morcha
- Parent: Mahendra Birua (father)
- Education: Graduate (Tata College, Chaibasa, Ranchi University)
- Occupation: Social Service, Politician

Deepak Birua is an Indian politician and member of the Jharkhand Mukti Morcha. He is the current cabinet minister for the Minister of Revenue, Minister of Registration and Land Reforms and Minister of Transport in Government of Jharkhand. Birua is a member of the Jharkhand Legislative Assembly from the Chaibasa constituency in West Singhbhum district in 2009, 2014, 2019 and 2024.
