= Dipika Pandey Singh =

Indian politician

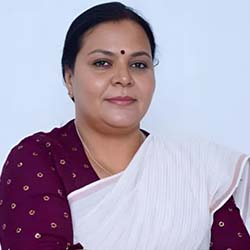

Cabinet Minister, Government of Jharkhand
- Incumbent
- Assumed office 5 December 2024
- Chief Minister: Hemant Soren
- Ministry and Departments: Rural Development.; Rural Works.; Panchayati Raj.

MLA, Jharkhand Vidhan Sabha
- Incumbent
- Assumed office 2019
- Preceded by: Ashok Kumar
- Constituency: Mahagama

Personal details
- Born: 22 June 1976 (age 50) Ranchi, Jharkhand, India
- Party: Indian National Congress
- Spouse: Ratnesh Kumar Singh
- Children: 2
- Occupation: Media professional

Dipika Pandey Singh is an Indian politician from Jharkhand and a member of the Indian National Congress. She was elected as a member of the Legislative Assembly of Jharkhand from Mahagama. Dipika is also a National Secretary of the Indian National Congress.

== Early life and education ==
Dipika Pandey Singh was born in a political family at Ranchi in Jharkhand. Her mother Pratibha Pandey is a former state president of the women's wing of Indian National Congress named as 'Mahila Congress'. She spent her formative years in Ranchi. She obtained a BSc degree in geology from St. Xavier's College, Ranchi in 1994–97. She also pursued MBA - Information Technology from Xavier Institute of Social Service, Ranchi in 1998–2000. She later studied LLB from Co-Operative College, Jamshedpur in 2008–2011.

== Personal Life ==
She is married to Ratnesh Kumar Singh, son of Avadh Bihari Singh, former Minister, Rural development, Government of Bihar and 4 times MLA, Mahagama, Jharkhand.

Her daughter and three others die in road accident. CM Hemant Soren and LOP Babulal Marandi expressed. According to the police officer, the speeding car in which four were travelling rammed the truck parked on the road.

== Political career ==
Dipika Pandey Singh started her political journey with Youth Wing of Indian National Congress, Youth Congress as elected General Secretary of Jharkhand Youth Congress. She was later elevated to national committee as national secretary of Youth Congress. After 2014 Lok Sabha election, she was made District President of Godda District Congress Committee with task of reviving Congress in once Congress stronghold Godda, Jharkhand. She is often credited with revival of Congress in the area and often talked about as among best performing District Congress Presidents in the country.

During her tenure as District Congress president, she took on the task of bringing youth and women in Congress. She went to every village in Godda, spending nights in the village and connecting people to Congress with her resolve of Gaon-Goan, Paon-Paon (Village visits on feet).

When mine workers died during accident at ECL, Lalmatia, she went on indefinite fast to ensure justice for victims' families. She got massive support and Govt. ultimately had to give assurances to victims.

In 2017, she took the issue of prohibition and how liquor directly impacts women. She campaigned extensively for prohibition and placed her at the center of women politics in the area.

In 2018, she joined Mahila Congress (women wing of Indian National Congress) as National Secretary and was made in-charge of Bihar.

In 2019, she contested MLA election on the symbol of Indian National Congress, as joint candidate of Indian National Congress, Jharkhand Mukti Morcha and Rastriya Janta Dal. She secured 89,224 votes and defeated her nearest rival Ashok Kumar of Bhartiya Janta Party by a margin of 12,499 votes.
