= Hafizul Hassan =

Indian politician

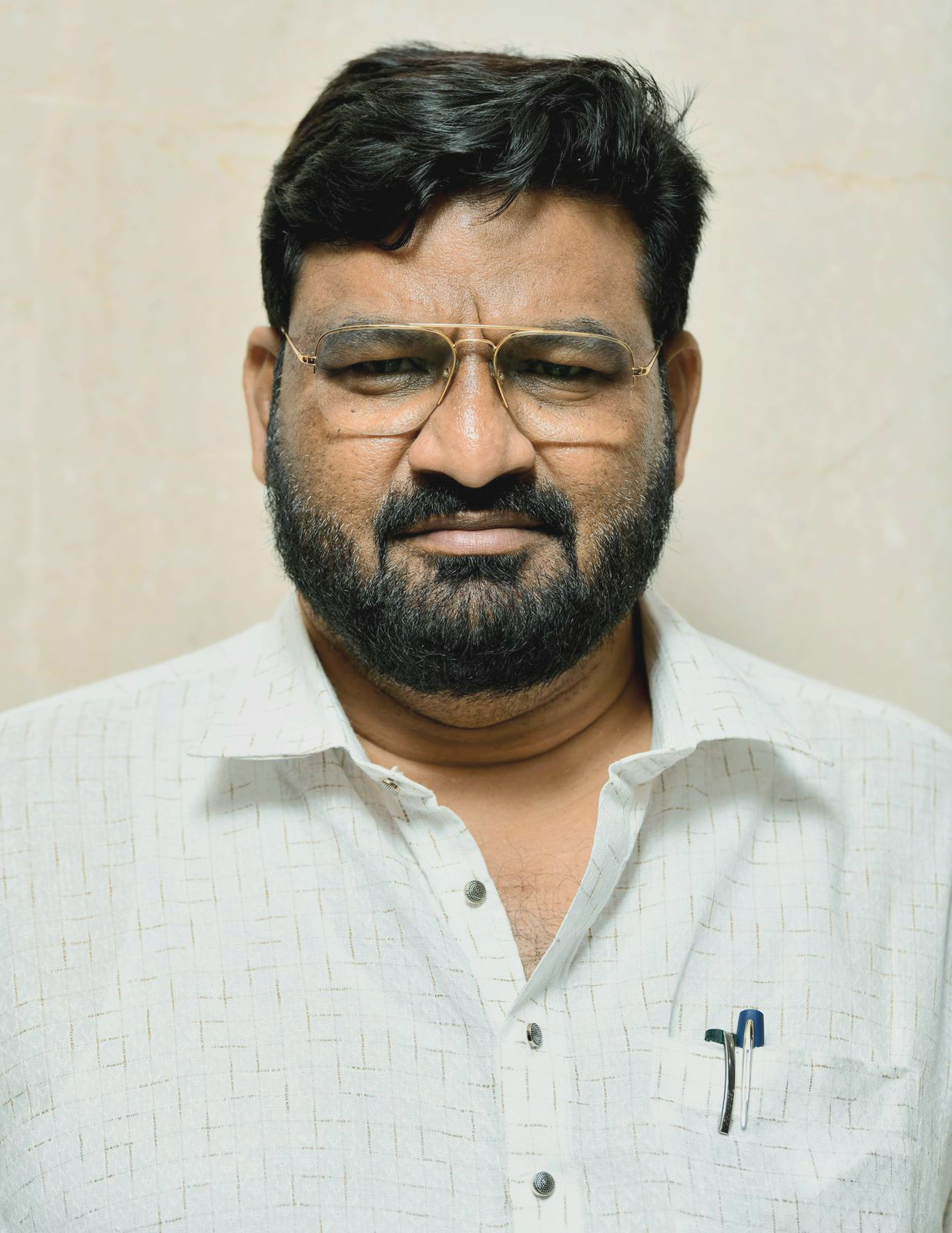

Cabinet Minister, Government of Jharkhand
- Incumbent
- Assumed office 5 December 2024
- Governor: Santosh Gangwar
- Chief Minister: Hemant Soren
- Ministries and Departments: Water Resources; Minority Welfare

Cabinet Minister, Government of Jharkhand
- In office 5 February 2021 – 28 November 2024
- Governor: Draupadi Murmu; Ramesh Bais; C. P. Radhakrishnan
- Chief Minister: Hemant Soren
- Ministries and Departments: Sports & Youth Affairs; Minority Welfare
- Preceded by: Haji Hussain Ansari

Member of the Jharkhand Legislative Assembly
- Incumbent
- Assumed office 2 May 2021
- Preceded by: Haji Hussain Ansari
- Constituency: Madhupur

Personal details
- Born: Jharkhand, India
- Party: Jharkhand Mukti Morcha
- Parent: Haji Hussain Ansari (father)
- Education: BIT Sindri

Hafizul Hassan Ansari is an Indian politician and the current Cabinet Minister in Government of Jharkhand and MLA from Madhupur, Jharkhand. He is the son of Haji Hussain Ansari, former Cabinet Minister in the same cabinet. He belongs to the Jharkhand Mukti Morcha party.

In July 2025 Ansari underwent heart surgery. In August 2025 he was hospitalized once more.
