= Yogendra Prasad =

Indian politician

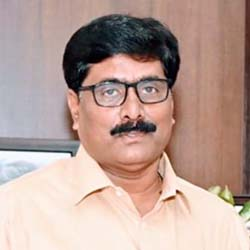
- In office 2014–2018
- Minister: Minister for Excise and Prohibition of Jharkhand
- Preceded by: Madhav Lal Singh
- Succeeded by: Babita Devi
- Constituency: Gomia
- Incumbent
- Assumed office 23 November 2024
- Preceded by: Lambodar Mahto
- Constituency: Gomia

Personal details
- Party: Jharkhand Mukti Morcha
- Profession: Politician
- Cabinet: Hemant Soren

Yogendra Prasad is an Indian politician from Jharkhand. He is a two time elected member of the Jharkhand Legislative Assembly from 2014 and 2024, representing Gomia Assembly constituency as a member of the Jharkhand Mukti Morcha.

== Political career ==
Yogendra Prasad is a senior leader affiliated with the Jharkhand Mukti Morcha (JMM).

He has been serving as the Minister for Excise and Prohibition in the Jharkhand Cabinet under Chief Minister Hemant Soren’s leadership.

== See also ==
- List of chief ministers of Jharkhand
- Jharkhand Legislative Assembly
