= Hemant Soren ministry =

Hemant Soren ministry may refer to these cabinets headed by Indian politician Hemant Soren as chief minister of Jharkhand:

- First Hemant Soren ministry (2013–2014)
- Second Hemant Soren ministry (2019–2024)
- Third Hemant Soren ministry (2024–2024)
- Fourth Hemant Soren ministry (2024–)
