= 2019 Jharkhand Legislative Assembly election =

Elections for the Legislative Assembly of Jharkhand, India

- 30 November – 20 December 2019

81 seats of Jharkhand Legislative Assembly 41 seats needed for a majority
- Turnout: 65.38% (▼1.15%)
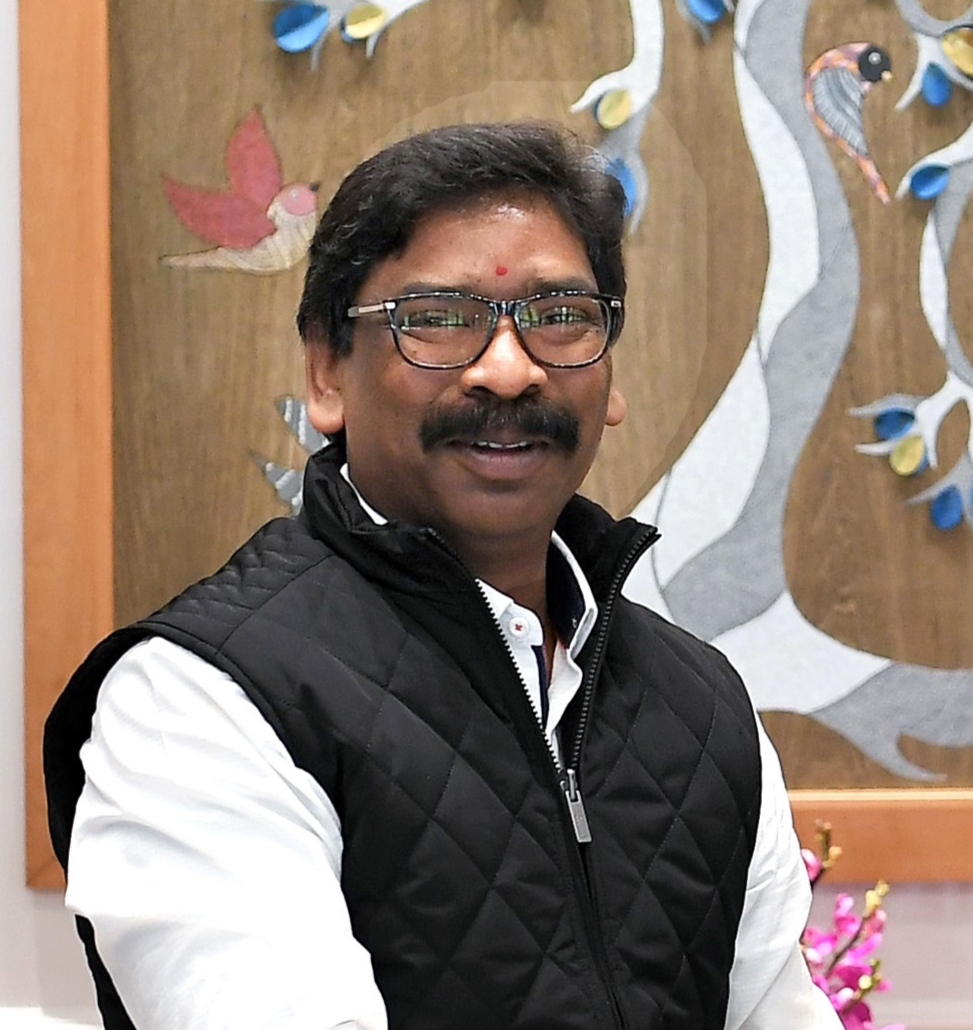

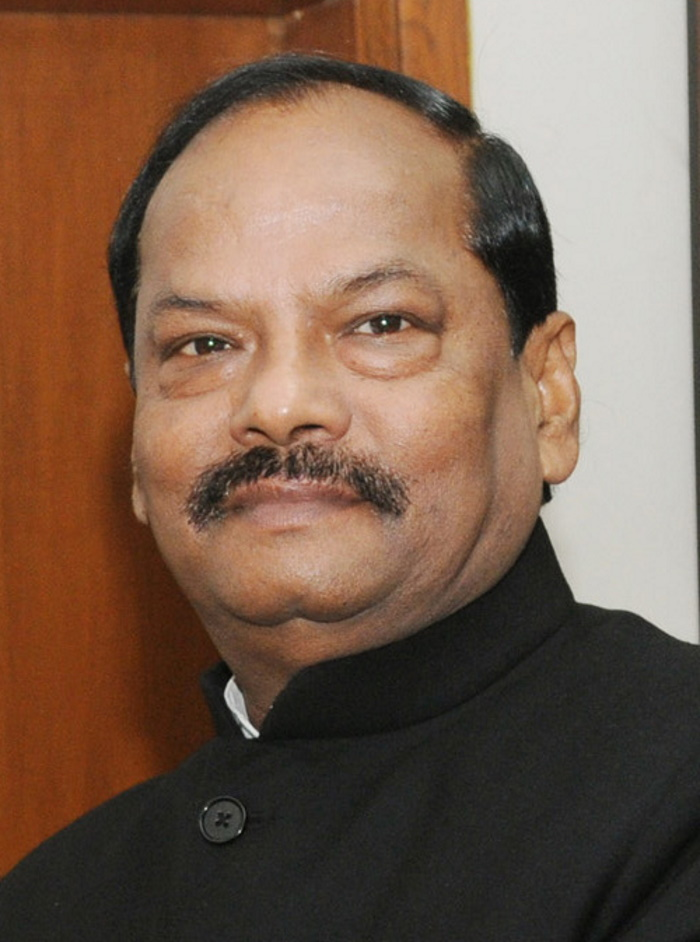

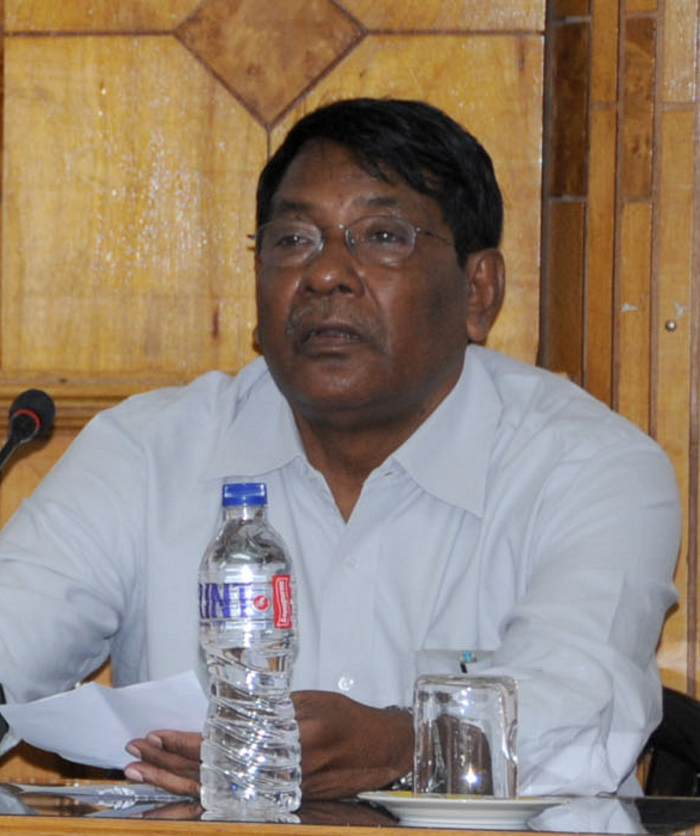

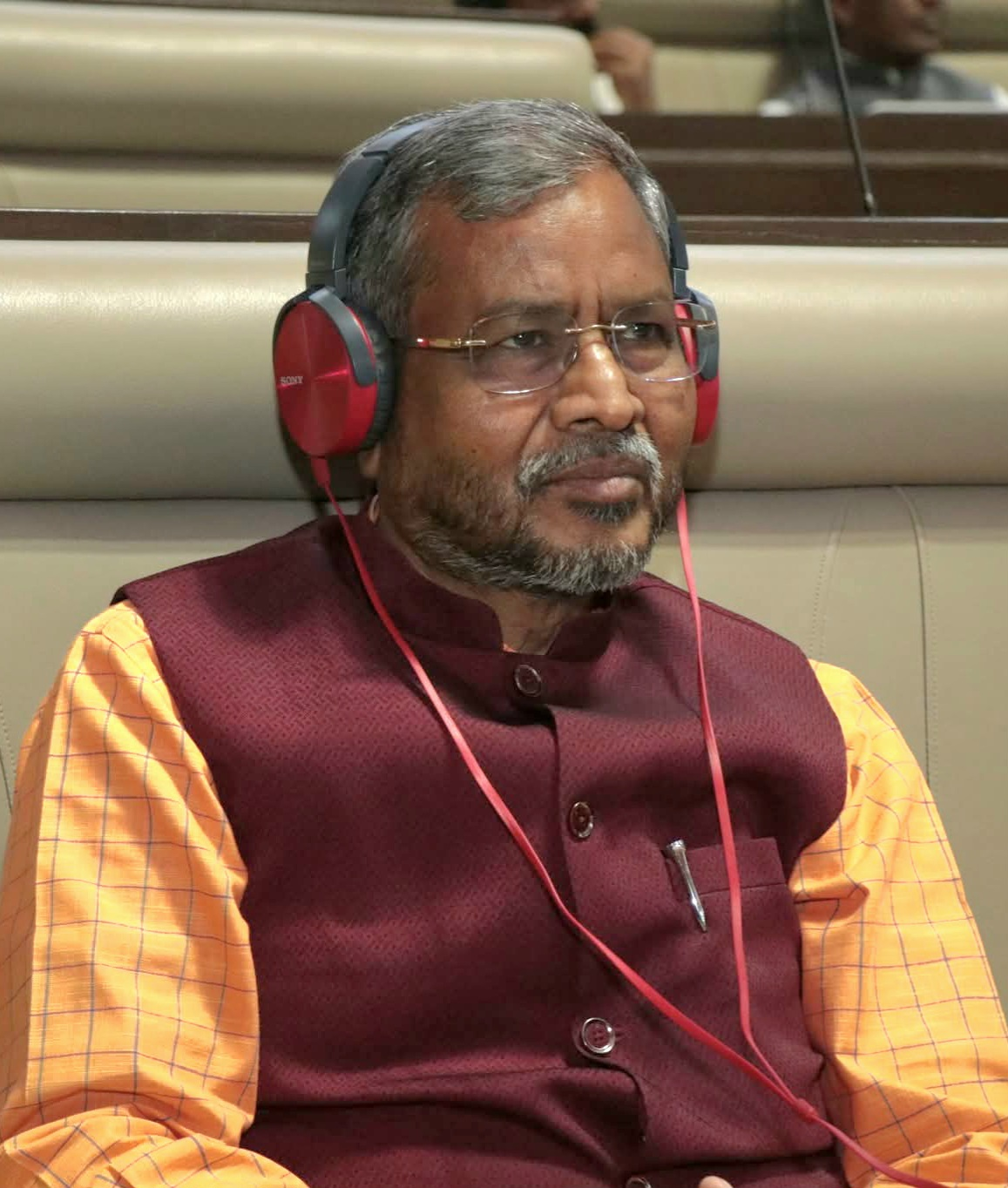

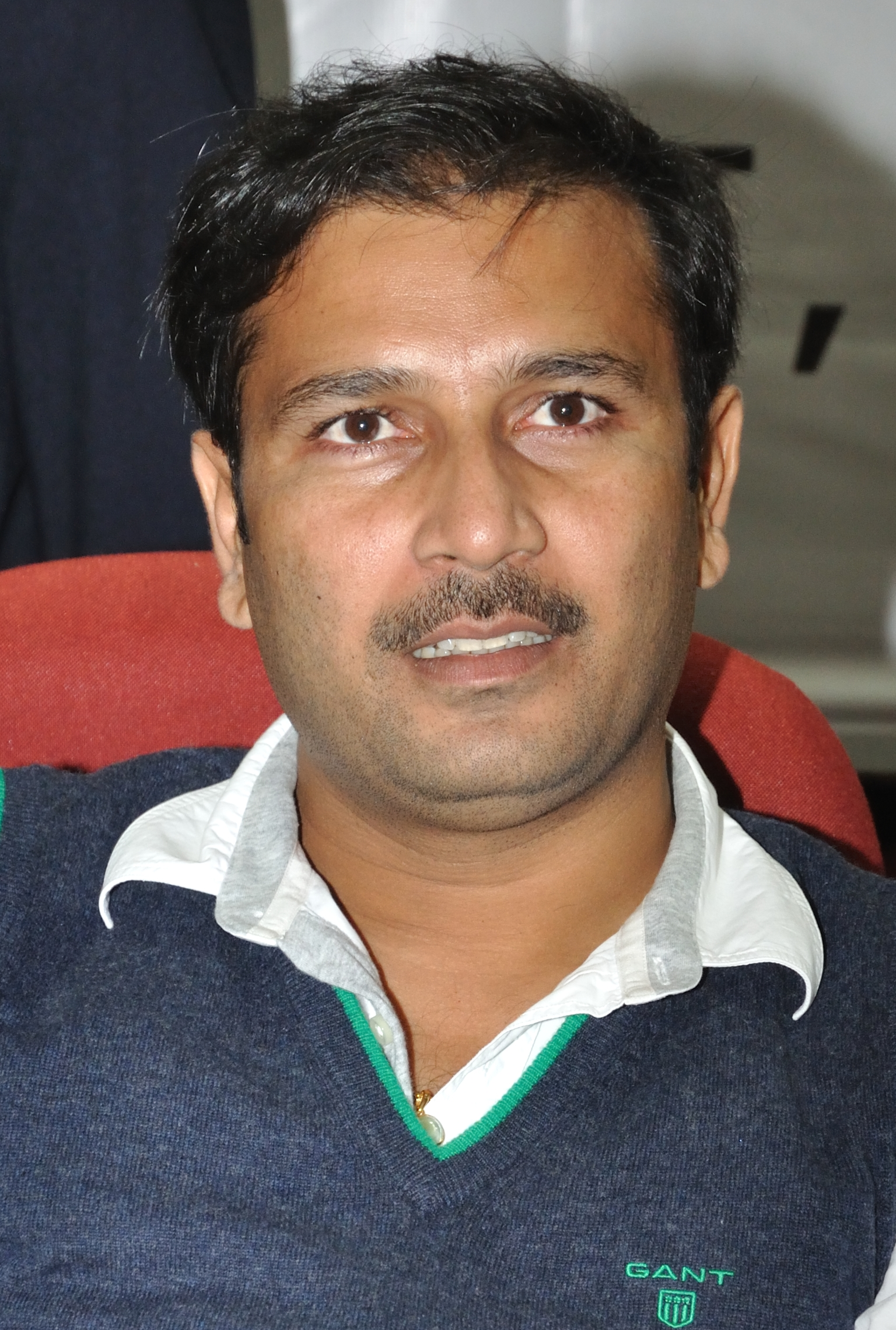
	Majority party	Minority party	Third party
Leader	Hemant Soren	Raghubar Das	Rameshwar Oraon
Party	JMM	BJP	INC
Alliance	UPA	NDA	UPA
Leader's seat	Barhait (retained), Dumka (vacated)	Jamshedpur East (lost)	Lohardaga (Won)
Last election	19	37	6
Seats won	30	25	16
Seat change	▲11	▼12	▲10
Popular vote	2,817,442	5,022,374	2,088,863
Percentage	18.72%	33.37%	13.88%
Swing	▼1.71%	▲2.11%	▲3.42%
	Fourth party	Fifth party	Sixth party
			RJD
Leader	Babulal Marandi	Sudesh Mahto	Satyanand Bhogta
Party	JVM(P)	AJSU	RJD
Alliance	-	-	UPA
Leader's seat	Dhanwar (Won)	Silli (Won)	Chatra (Won)
Last election	8	5	0
Seats won	3	2	1
Seat change	▼5	▼3	▲1
Popular vote	820,757	1,219,535	4,13,167
Percentage	5.45%	8.10%	2.75%
Swing	▼4.54%	▲4.42%	▼0.38%
	Seventh party	Eighth party	Ninth party
			AIMIM
Leader	Vinod Kumar Singh	Kamlesh Kumar Singh
Party	CPI(ML)L	NCP	AIMIM
Alliance	-	-	-
Leader's seat	Bagodar (won)	Hussainabad (won)
Last election	1	did not contest	Did not contest
Seats won	1	1	0
Seat change	Steady	▲1	Steady
Popular vote	1,72,475	63,320	173,980
Percentage	1.15%	0.42%	1.16%
Swing	▼0.37%	▲0.42%	Steady
- Seatwise map of the election results

- Structure of the Jharkhand Legislative Assembly after the election
Chief Minister before election
Raghubar Das
BJP
Elected Chief Minister
Hemant Soren
JMM

Legislative Assembly elections were held in Jharkhand, India, from 30 November to 20 December 2019 to elect the 81 members of the 5th Jharkhand Legislative Assembly. Results were declared on 23 December 2019. The pre-election term of the Assembly was set to end on 27 December 2019.

== Schedule ==
The schedule for the election proceedings was announced on 1 November 2019.

Poll Event	Phase 1	Phase 2	Phase 3	Phase 4	Phase 5
Notification date	6 November 2019	11 November 2019	16 November 2019	22 November 2019	26 November 2019
Last date for filing nominations	13 November 2019	18 November 2019	25 November 2019	29 November 2019	3 December 2019
Scrutiny of nominations	14 November 2019	19 November 2019	26 November 2019	30 November 2019	4 December 2019
The last date for withdrawal of candidature	16 November 2019	21 November 2019	28 November 2019	2 December 2019	6 December 2019
Date of poll	30 November 2019	7 December 2019	12 December 2019	16 December 2019	20 December 2019
Counting of votes	21 December 2019				

== Prominent Parties/Alliance ==
Party/Alliance		Flag	Electoral symbol	Leader	Seats contested
MGB	Jharkhand Mukti Morcha			Hemant Soren	43
MGB	Indian National Congress			Rameshwar Oraon	31
MGB	Rashtriya Janata Dal			Abhay Kumar Singh	7
Bharatiya Janata Party				Raghubar Das	79
Jharkhand Vikas Morcha (P)				Babulal Marandi	81
All Jharkhand Students Union				Sudesh Mahto	53
Left Front	Communist Party of India			Mahendra Pathak	18
Left Front	Communist Party of India (ML) L				14
Left Front	Communist Party of India (Marxist)			Prakash Viplav	9
Left Front	Marxist Coordination Committee			Arup Chatterjee	8
Nationalist Congress Party				Kamlesh Kumar Singh	7

== List of Candidates ==
Constituency		MGB		BJP		JVM(P)		AJSUP	
#	Name	Party	Candidate	Party	Candidate	Party	Candidate	Party	Candidate
1	Rajmahal	JMM	Ketabuddin Sekh	BJP	Anant Kumar Ojha	JVM(P)	Rajkumar Yadav	AJSU	Md. Tajuddin
2	Borio	JMM	Lobin Hembrom	BJP	Surya Narayan Hansada	JVM(P)	Babu Ram Murmu	AJSU	Tala Marandi
3	Barhait	JMM	Hemant Soren	BJP	Simon Malto	JVM(P)	Hopna Tudu	AJSU	Gamliyel Hembrom
4	Littipara	JMM	Dinesh William Marandi	BJP	Daniel Kisku	JVM(P)	Raska Hembram		
5	Pakur	INC	Alamgir Alam	BJP	Veni Prasad Gupta	JVM(P)	Qamruddin Ansari	AJSU	Aquil Akhtar
6	Maheshpur	JMM	Stephen Marandi	BJP	Mistry Soren	JVM(P)	Shivdhan Hembrom	AJSU	Suphal Marandi
7	Shikaripara	JMM	Nalin Soren	BJP	Paritosh Soren	JVM(P)	Rajesh Murmu	AJSU	Shyam Marandi
8	Nala	JMM	Rabindra Nath Mahato	BJP	Satyanand Jha	JVM(P)	Pushpa Soren	AJSU	Madhav Chandra Mahto
9	Jamtara	INC	Irfan Ansari	BJP	Birendra Mandal	JVM(P)	Abdul Mannan Ansari	AJSU	Chameli Devi
10	Dumka	JMM	Hemant Soren	BJP	Lois Marandi	JVM(P)	Anjula Murmu		
11	Jama	JMM	Sita Murmu	BJP	Suresh Murmu	JVM(P)	Arjun Marandi	AJSU	Steffy Teresa Murmu
12	Jarmundi	INC	Badal Patralekh	BJP	Devendra Kunwar	JVM(P)	Sanjay Kumar		
13	Madhupur	JMM	Haji Hussain Ansari	BJP	Raj Paliwar	JVM(P)	Sahim Khan	AJSU	Ganga Narayan Ray
14	Sarath	JMM	Parimal Kumar Singh	BJP	Randhir Kumar Singh	JVM(P)	Uday Shankar Singh	AJSU	Firoj Miyan
15	Deoghar	RJD	Suresh Paswan	BJP	Narayan Das	JVM(P)	Nirmala Bharti	AJSU	Santosh Paswan
16	Poreyahat	JMM	Ashok Kumar	BJP	Gajadhar Singh	JVM(P)	Pradeep Yadav		
17	Godda	RJD	Sanjay Prasad Yadav	BJP	Amit Kumar Mandal	JVM(P)	Phool Kumari	AJSU	Awadhesh Kumar Singh
18	Mahagama	INC	Dipika Pandey Singh	BJP	Ashok Kumar	JVM(P)	Sanjiv Kumar Mishra	AJSU	Ataur Rahaman Siddiki
19	Kodarma	RJD	Amitabh Kumar	BJP	Dr. Neera Yadav	JVM(P)	Ramesh Harshdhar	AJSU	Shalini Gupta
20	Barkatha	RJD	Mohammad Khalid Khalil	BJP	Janki Prasad Yadav	JVM(P)	Bateshwar Prasad Mehta	AJSU	Pradeep Kumar Mehta
21	Barhi	INC	Umashankar Akela	BJP	Manoj Kumar Yadav	JVM(P)	Arbind Kumar		
22	Barkagaon	INC	Amba Prasad	BJP	Loknath Mahto	JVM(P)	Durga Charan Prasad	AJSU	Roshan Lal Choudhary
23	Ramgarh	INC	Mamta Devi	BJP	Rananjay Kumar @ Kuntu Babu	JVM(P)	Arif Ahmad Kuraishi	AJSU	Sunita Choudhary
24	Mandu	JMM	Ram Prakash Bhai Patel	BJP	Jai Prakash Bhai Patel	JVM(P)	Chandra Nath Bhai Patel	AJSU	Nirmal Mahto
25	Hazaribagh	INC	Dr. Ramchandra Prasad	BJP	Manish Jaiswal	JVM(P)	Munna Singh		
26	Simaria	INC	Yogendra Nath Baitha	BJP	Kishun Kumar Das	JVM(P)	Ramadev Singh Bhogta	AJSU	Manoj Kumar Chandra
27	Chatra	RJD	Satyanand Bhogta	BJP	Janardan Paswan	JVM(P)	Tileshwar Ram		
28	Dhanwar	JMM	Nijamuddin Ansari	BJP	Lakshman Prasad Singh	JVM(P)	Babulal Marandi		
29	Bagodar	INC	Vasudev Pra Verma	BJP	Nagendra Mahto	JVM(P)	Rajani Kaur	AJSU	Anup Kumar Pandey
30	Jamua	INC	Manju Kumari	BJP	Kedar Hazra	JVM(P)	Chandrika Mahtha	AJSU	Satyanarayan Das
31	Gandey	JMM	Sarfaraz Ahmad	BJP	Jai Prakash Verma	JVM(P)	Dilip Kumar Verma	AJSU	Arjun Baitha
32	Giridih	JMM	Sudivya Kumar	BJP	Nirbhay Kumar Shahabadi	JVM(P)	Chunnu Kant		
33	Dumri	JMM	Jagarnath Mahto	BJP	Pradeep Kumar Sahu	JVM(P)	Md. Samsuddin	AJSU	Yashoda Devi
34	Gomia	JMM	Babita Devi	BJP	Lakshman Kumar Nayak	JVM(P)	Gautam Tiwari	AJSU	Lambodar Mahto
35	Bermo	INC	Rajendra Pd. Singh	BJP	Yogeshwar Mahto	JVM(P)	Ram Kinkar Pandey	AJSU	Kashi Nath Singh
36	Bokaro	INC	Shweta Singh	BJP	Biranchi Narayan	JVM(P)	Prakash Kumar	AJSU	Rajendra Mahato
37	Chandankyari	JMM	Bijay Kumar Rajwar	BJP	Amar Kumar Bauri	JVM(P)	Rohit Kumar Das	AJSU	Uma Kant Rajak
38	Sindri	JMM	Fulchand Mandal	BJP	Indrajit Mahato	JVM(P)	Ramesh Kumar Rahi	AJSU	Sadanand Mahato
39	Nirsa	JMM	Ashok Kumar Mandal	BJP	Aparna Sengupta	JVM(P)	Bampy Chakrawarty		
40	Dhanbad	INC	Mannan Mallick	BJP	Raj Sinha	JVM(P)	Saroj Kumar Singh	AJSU	Pradip Mohan Sahay
41	Jharia	INC	Purnima Niraj Singh	BJP	Ragini Singh	JVM(P)	Yogendra Yadav	AJSU	Abadhesh Kumar
42	Tundi	JMM	Mathura Prasad Mahato	BJP	Vikram Pandey	JVM(P)	Saba Ahmad	AJSU	Raj Kishore Mahato
43	Baghmara	INC	Jaleshwar Mahato	BJP	Dulu Mahato	JVM(P)	Santosh Kumar Mahato		
44	Baharagora	JMM	Samir Kr. Mohanty	BJP	Kunal Shadangi	JVM(P)	Harmohan Mahato		
45	Ghatsila	JMM	Ramdas Soren	BJP	Lakhan Chandra Mardi	JVM(P)	Dr Sunita Debdoot Soren	AJSU	Pradeep Kumar Balmuchu
46	Potka	JMM	Sanjib Sardar	BJP	Menka Sardar	JVM(P)	Naresh Kumar Murmu	AJSU	Bulu Rani Singh
47	Jugsalai	JMM	Mangal Kalindi	BJP	Muchiram Bauri	JVM(P)	Ramchandra Paswan	AJSU	Ram Chandra Sahis
48	Jamshedpur East	INC	Gourav Vallabh	BJP	Raghubar Das	JVM(P)	Abhay Singh		
49	Jamshedpur West	INC	Banna Gupta	BJP	Devendra Nath Singh	JVM(P)	Pankaj Kumar	AJSU	Brijesh Singh
50	Ichagarh	JMM	Sabita Mahato	BJP	Sadhu Charan Mahato	JVM(P)	Binod Ray	AJSU	Hare Lal Mahato
51	Saraikella	JMM	Champai Soren	BJP	Ganesh Mahali	JVM(P)	Anil Soren	AJSU	Anant Ram Tudu
52	Chaibasa	JMM	Deepak Birua	BJP	J. B. Tubid	JVM(P)	Chandmani Balmuchu		
53	Majhganon	JMM	Niral Purty	BJP	Bhupendra Pingua	JVM(P)	Joseph Purty	AJSU	Nandlal Birua
54	Jagannathpur	INC	Sona Ram Sinku	BJP	Sudhir Kumar Sundi	JVM(P)	Mangal Singh Bobonga	AJSU	Mangal Singh Suren
55	Manoharpur	JMM	Joba Majhi	BJP	Gurucharan Nayak	JVM(P)	Sushila Toppo	AJSU	Birsa Munda
56	Chakradharpur	JMM	Sukhram Oraon	BJP	Laxman Giluwa	JVM(P)	Shashibhusan Samad	AJSU	Ramlal Munda
57	Kharasawan	JMM	Dashrath Gagrai	BJP	Jawahar Lal Banra	JVM(P)	Ram Honhaga	AJSU	Sanjay Jarika
58	Tamar	JMM	Vikash Kumar Munda	BJP	Reeta Devi	JVM(P)	Prem Shankar Shahi Munda	AJSU	Ram Durlav Singh Munda
59	Torpa	JMM	Sudeep Guria	BJP	Koche Munda	JVM(P)	Ishwardutt Marshal Mundu		
60	Khunti	JMM	Sushil Pahan	BJP	Nilkanth Singh Munda	JVM(P)	Dayamani Barla		
61	Silli	JMM	Seema Devi			JVM(P)	Umesh Mahto	AJSU	Sudesh Kumar Mahto
62	Khijri	INC	Rajesh Kachhap	BJP	Ram Kumar Pahan	JVM(P)	Antu Tirkey	AJSU	Ramdhan Bediya
63	Ranchi	JMM	Mahua Maji	BJP	C. P. Singh	JVM(P)	Sunil Kumar Gupta	AJSU	Barsha Gari
64	Hatia	INC	Ajay Nath Shahdeo	BJP	Navin Jaiswal	JVM(P)	Shobha Yadav	AJSU	Bharat Kanshi
65	Kanke	INC	Suresh Kumar Baitha	BJP	Sammari Lal	JVM(P)	Kamlesh Ram	AJSU	Ramjeet Ganjhu
66	Mandar	INC	Sunny Toppo	BJP	Deo Kumar Dhan	JVM(P)	Bandhu Tirkey	AJSU	Hemlata Oraon
67	Sisai	JMM	Jiga Susaran Horo	BJP	Dinesh Oraon	JVM(P)	Lohor Main Oraon		
68	Gumla	JMM	Bhushan Tirkey	BJP	Mishir Kujur	JVM(P)	Rajneel Tigga		
69	Bishunpur	JMM	Chamra Linda	BJP	Ashok Oraon	JVM(P)	Mahatma Oraon		
70	Simdega	INC	Bhushan Bara	BJP	Shradhanand Besra	JVM(P)	Mohan Baraik		
71	Kolebira	INC	Naman Bixal Kongari	BJP	Sujan Jojo	JVM(P)	Deepak Kerketta		
72	Lohardaga	INC	Rameshwar Oraon	BJP	Sukhdeo Bhagat	JVM(P)	Pawan Tigga	AJSU	Neru Shanti Bhagat
73	Manika	INC	Ramchandra Singh	BJP	Raghupal Singh	JVM(P)	Rajpal Singh		
74	Latehar	JMM	Baidyanath Ram	BJP	Prakash Ram	JVM(P)	Aman Kumar Bhogta		
75	Panki	INC	Devendra Kumar Singh	BJP	Kushwaha Shashi Bhushan	JVM(P)	Rudra Kumar Shukla		
76	Daltonganj	INC	Krishna Nand Tripathi	BJP	Alok Kumar Chaurasiya	JVM(P)	Rahul Agrawal		
77	Bishrampur	INC	Chandra Shekhar Dubey	BJP	Ramchandra Chandravanshi	JVM(P)	Anju Singh		
78	Chattarpur	RJD	Vijay Kumar	BJP	Pushpa Devi	JVM(P)	Dharmendra Prakash Badal	AJSU	Radha Krishna Kishore
79	Hussainabad	RJD	Sanjay Kumar Singh			JVM(P)	Birendra Kumar	AJSU	Kushwaha Shivpujan Mehta
80	Garhwa	JMM	Mithilesh Kumar Thakur	BJP	Satyendra Nath Tiwari	JVM(P)	Suraj Prasad Gupta		
81	Bhawanathpur	INC	Kedar Prasad Yadav	BJP	Bhanu Pratap Shahi	JVM(P)	Vijay Kumar Keshri		

== Surveys and polls ==
=== Opinion polls ===
Publishing Date	Polling Agency	Data Metric						
Publishing Date	Polling Agency	Data Metric	BJP	AJSU	JMM	INC	JVM	Others
28 November 2019	IANS – CVoter	Vote share	33.3 %	4.6 %	18 %	12.4 %	7.7 %	23.2 %
28 November 2019	IANS – CVoter	Seat projection	28 – 38	3 – 9	18 – 28	6 – 10	3 – 9	3 – 9

=== Exit polls ===
Publishing date	Polling agency						Majority
Publishing date	Polling agency	BJP	UPA	AJSU	JVM (P)	Others	Majority
20 December 2019	India Today - Axis My India	27 (22–32)	43 (38–50)	5 (3–5)	3 (2–4)	3 (4–7)	UPA
20 December 2019	ABP - IANS - CVoter	32 (28–36)	35 (31–39)	5 (3–7)	3 (1–5)	6 (4–8)	Hung
20 December 2019	Times Now	28	44	4	3	2	UPA

== Result ==
Result of the 2019 Jharkhand Legislative Assembly election by constituency

Vote Share
1. BJP (33.4%)
2. INC (13.9%)
3. JMM (18.7%)
4. RJD (2.75%)
5. AJSU (8.10%)
6. JVMP (5.45%)
7. Others (17.7%)

Parties and coalitions	Popular vote			Seats	
Parties and coalitions	Votes	%	± pp	Won	+/−
Jharkhand Mukti Morcha	28,17,442	18.72%	▼1.71%	30	▲11
Indian National Congress	20,88,863	13.88%	▲3.42%	16	▲10
Rashtriya Janata Dal	4,13,167	2.75%	▼0.38%	1	▲1
Total	53,19,472	35.35%	▲1.33%	47	▲22
Bharatiya Janata Party	50,22,374	33.37%	▲2.11%	25	▼12
Jharkhand Vikas Morcha (Prajatantrik)	8,20,757	5.45%	▼4.54%	3	▼5
All Jharkhand Students Union	12,19,535	8.10%	▲4.42%	2	▼3
Communist Party of India (Marxist–Leninist) Liberation	1,72,475	1.15%	▼0.37%	1	Steady
Nationalist Congress Party	63,320	0.42%		1	▲1
All India Majlis-e-Ittehadul Muslimeen	1,73,980	1.16%		Steady	Steady
Independents	9,85,438	6.55%	▼0.14%	2	▲2
None of the Above	2,05,050	1.36%			
Total	1,50,48,908	100.00		81	
Valid votes	1,50,48,908	99.82			
Invalid votes	27,252	0.18			
Votes cast / turnout	1,50,76,160	65.38			
Abstentions	79,81,875	34.62			
Registered voters	2,30,58,035				

=== Alliance wise results ===
Alliance	Party	Contested	Seats Won	Alliance wise seat won	▲/▼ Seats
UPA	Jharkhand Mukti Morcha	43	30	47	▲11
UPA	Indian National Congress	31	16	47	▲10
UPA	Rashtriya Janata Dal	7	1	47	▲1
NDA	Bharatiya Janata Party	79	25	25	▼12
None	Jharkhand Vikas Morcha (P)	81	3	3	▼5
None	All Jharkhand Students Union	53	2	2	▼3
None	Communist Party of India (M-L) L	14	1	1	Steady
None	Nationalist Congress Party	7	1	1	▲1
None	Independent		2	2	▲2
Total			81		

=== District wise results ===
District	Seats				
District	Seats	UPA	BJP	IND	OTH
Sahebganj	3	2	1	—N/a	—N/a
Pakur	3	3	—N/a	—N/a	—N/a
Dumka	4	4	—N/a	—N/a	—N/a
Jamtara	2	2	—N/a	—N/a	—N/a
Deoghar	3	1	2	—N/a	—N/a
Godda	3	1	1	—N/a	1
Koderma	1	—N/a	1	—N/a	—N/a
Hazaribagh	4	2	1	1	—N/a
Ramgarh	2	1	1	—N/a	—N/a
Chatra	2	1	1	—N/a	—N/a
Giridih	6	3	1	—N/a	2
Bokaro	4	1	2	—N/a	1
Dhanbad	6	2	4	—N/a	—N/a
East Singhbhum	6	5	—N/a	1	—N/a
Seraikela Kharsawan	3	3	—N/a	—N/a	—N/a
West Singhbhum	5	5	—N/a	—N/a	—N/a
Ranchi	7	2	3	—N/a	2
Khunti	2	—N/a	2	—N/a	—N/a
Gumla	3	3	—N/a	—N/a	—N/a
Simdega	2	2	—N/a	—N/a	—N/a
Lohardaga	1	1	—N/a	—N/a	—N/a
Latehar	2	2	—N/a	—N/a	—N/a
Palamu	5	—N/a	4	—N/a	1
Garhwa	2	1	1	—N/a	—N/a
Total	81	47	25	2	7

=== Results by Constituency ===
Constituency		Poll %	Winner				Runner-up				Margin	
Constituency		Poll %	Candidate	Party	Votes	%	Candidate	Party	Votes	%	Votes	%
1	Rajmahal	69.70	Anant Kumar Ojha	BJP	88,904	42.26	Md. Tajuddin	AJSU	76,532	36.38	12,372	5.88
2	Borio	65.13	Lobin Hembrom	JMM	77,365	47.40	Surya Narayan Hansada	BJP	59,441	36.42	17,924	10.98
3	Barhait	70.51	Hemant Soren	JMM	73,725	53.49	Simon Malto	BJP	47,985	34.82	25,740	18.67
4	Littipara	72.16	Dinesh William Marandi	JMM	66,675	46.24	Daniel Kisku	BJP	52,772	36.60	13,903	9.64
5	Pakur	77.23	Alamgir Alam	INC	1,28,218	51.86	Veni Prasad Gupta	BJP	63,110	25.53	65,108	26.33
6	Maheshpur	76.37	Stephen Marandi	JMM	89,197	53.94	Mistry Soren	BJP	55,091	33.31	34,106	20.63
7	Shikaripara	73.49	Nalin Soren	JMM	79,400	51.78	Paritosh Soren	BJP	49,929	32.56	29,471	19.22
8	Nala	78.62	Rabindra Nath Mahato	JMM	61,356	34.97	Satyanand Jha	BJP	57,836	32.96	3,520	2.01
9	Jamtara	76.64	Irfan Ansari	INC	1,12,829	53.11	Birendra Mandal	BJP	74,088	34.87	38,741	18.24
10	Dumka	67.12	Hemant Soren	JMM	81,007	48.86	Lois Marandi	BJP	67,819	40.91	13,188	7.95
11	Jama	69.73	Sita Murmu	JMM	60,925	42.43	Suresh Murmu	BJP	58,499	40.74	2,426	1.69
12	Jarmundi	71.77	Badal	INC	52,507	32.22	Devendra Kunwar	BJP	49,408	30.32	3,099	1.90
13	Madhupur	73.80	Haji Hussain Ansari	JMM	88,115	38.40	Raj Paliwar	BJP	65,046	28.34	23,069	10.06
14	Sarath	78.01	Randhir Kumar Singh	BJP	90,895	42.50	Uday Shankar Singh	JVM	62,175	29.07	28,720	13.43
15	Deoghar	63.86	Narayan Das	BJP	95,491	41.01	Suresh Paswan	RJD	92,867	39.88	2,624	1.13
16	Poreyahat	68.69	Pradeep Yadav	JVM	77,358	41.00	Gajadhar Singh	BJP	63,761	33.80	13,597	7.20
17	Godda	66.36	Amit Kumar Mandal	BJP	87,578	45.74	Sanjay Prasad Yadav	RJD	83,066	43.38	4,512	2.36
18	Mahagama	65.90	Deepika Pandey Singh	INC	89,224	45.49	Ashok Kumar	BJP	76,725	39.12	12,499	6.37
19	Kodarma	59.71	Dr. Neera Yadav	BJP	63,675	31.35	Amitabh Kumar	RJD	61,878	30.46	1,797	0.89
20	Barkatha	62.48	Amit Kumar Yadav	IND	72,572	34.29	Janki Prasad Yadav	BJP	47,760	22.57	24,812	11.72
21	Barhi	62.63	Umashankar Akela	INC	84,358	46.78	Manoj Kumar Yadav	BJP	72,987	40.48	11,371	6.30
22	Barkagaon	65.77	Amba Prasad	INC	98,862	44.13	Roshan Lal Choudhary	AJSU	67,348	30.06	31,514	14.07
23	Ramgarh	71.36	Mamta Devi	INC	99,944	44.70	Sunita Choudhary	AJSU	71,226	31.86	28,718	12.84
24	Mandu	61.79	Jai Prakash Bhai Patel	BJP	49,855	20.87	Nirmal Mahto	AJSU	47,793	20.01	2,062	0.86
25	Hazaribagh	56.16	Manish Jaiswal	BJP	1,06,208	49.12	Dr. Ramchandra Prasad	INC	54,396	25.16	51,812	23.96
26	Simaria	61.67	Kishun Kumar Das	BJP	61,438	30.25	Manoj Kumar Chandra	AJSU	50,442	24.84	10,996	5.41
27	Chatra	58.75	Satyanand Bhokta	RJD	1,01,710	46.41	Janardan Paswan	BJP	77,655	35.44	24,055	10.97
28	Dhanwar	61.69	Babulal Marandi	JVM	52,352	27.58	Lakshman Prasad Singh	BJP	34,802	18.33	17,550	9.25
29	Bagodar	66.44	Vinod Kumar Singh	CPI(ML)	98,201	46.15	Nagendra Mahto	BJP	83,656	39.31	14,545	6.84
30	Jamua	59.29	Kedar Hazra	BJP	58,468	33.67	Manju Kumari	INC	40,293	23.21	18,175	10.46
31	Gandey	69.56	Dr Sarfraz Ahmad	JMM	65,023	34.71	Jai Prakash Verma	BJP	56,168	29.98	8,855	4.73
32	Giridih	63.37	Sudivya Kumar	JMM	80,871	48.19	Nirbhay Kumar Shahabadi	BJP	64,987	38.72	15,884	9.47
33	Dumri	69.75	Jagarnath Mahto	JMM	71,128	37.38	Yashoda Devi	AJSU	36,840	19.36	34,288	18.02
34	Gomia	68.91	Lambodar Mahto	AJSU	71,859	37.90	Babita Devi	JMM	60,922	32.13	10,937	5.77
35	Bermo	60.93	Rajendra Pd. Singh	INC	88,945	46.88	Yogeshwar Mahto	BJP	63,773	33.61	25,172	13.27
36	Bokaro	51.50	Biranchi Narayan	BJP	1,12,333	41.42	Shweta Singh	INC	99,020	36.51	13,313	4.91
37	Chandankyari	73.94	Amar Kumar Bauri	BJP	67,739	38.03	Uma Kant Rajak	AJSU	58,528	32.86	9,211	5.17
38	Sindri	71.75	Indrajit Mahato	BJP	80,967	35.58	Anand Mahato	MCO	72,714	31.95	8,253	3.63
39	Nirsa	68.21	Aparna Sengupta	BJP	89,082	42.21	Arup Chatterjee	MCO	63,624	30.14	25,458	12.07
40	Dhanbad	53.30	Raj Sinha	BJP	1,20,773	52.31	Mannan Mallick	INC	90,144	39.04	30,629	13.27
41	Jharia	52.32	Purnima Niraj Singh	INC	79,786	50.34	Ragini Singh	BJP	67,732	42.73	12,054	7.61
42	Tundi	69.00	Mathura Prasad Mahato	JMM	72,552	37.49	Vikram Pandey	BJP	46,893	24.23	25,659	13.26
43	Baghmara	62.64	Dulu Mahato	BJP	78,291	43.71	Jaleshwar Mahato	INC	77,467	43.25	824	0.46
44	Baharagora	75.98	Samir Kr. Mohanty	JMM	1,06,017	61.99	Kunal Shadangi	BJP	45,452	26.58	60,565	35.41
45	Ghatsila	70.03	Ramdas Soren	JMM	63,531	37.36	Lakhan Chandra Mardi	BJP	56,807	33.41	6,724	3.95
46	Potka	69.12	Sanjib Sardar	JMM	1,10,753	55.61	Menka Sardar	BJP	67,643	33.97	43,110	21.64
47	Jugsalai	66.14	Mangal Kalindi	JMM	88,581	40.95	Muchiram Bauri	BJP	66,647	30.81	21,934	10.14
48	Jamshedpur East	56.93	Saryu Roy	IND	73,945	42.59	Raghubar Das	BJP	58,112	33.47	15,833	9.12
49	Jamshedpur West	53.89	Banna Gupta	INC	96,778	50.28	Devendra Nath Singh	BJP	74,195	38.55	22,583	11.73
50	Ichagarh	75.63	Sabita Mahato	JMM	57,546	29.25	Hare Lal Mahato	AJSU	38,836	19.74	18,710	9.51
51	Saraikella	68.10	Champai Soren	JMM	1,11,554	48.58	Ganesh Mahali	BJP	95,887	41.76	15,667	6.82
52	Chaibasa	66.49	Deepak Birua	JMM	69,485	50.37	J. B. Tubid	BJP	43,326	31.41	26,159	18.96
53	Majhganon	68.08	Niral Purty	JMM	67,750	51.58	Bhupendra Pingua	BJP	20,558	15.65	47,192	35.93
54	Jagannathpur	65.12	Sona Ram Sinku	INC	32,499	28.62	Mangal Singh Bobonga	JVM	20,893	18.40	11,606	10.22
55	Manoharpur	61.24	Joba Majhi	JMM	50,945	42.12	Gurucharan Nayak	BJP	34,926	28.87	16,019	13.25
56	Chakradharpur	65.58	Sukhram Oraon	JMM	43,832	36.77	Laxman Giluwa	BJP	31,598	26.51	12,234	10.26
57	Kharasawan	72.87	Dashrath Gagrai	JMM	73,341	48.15	Jawahar Lal Banra	BJP	50,546	33.19	22,795	14.96
58	Tamar	68.48	Vikas Kumar Munda	JMM	55,491	39.22	Ram Durlav Singh Munda	AJSU	24,520	17.33	30,971	21.89
59	Torpa	64.37	Koche Munda	BJP	43,482	37.17	Sudeep Guria	JMM	33,852	28.94	9,630	8.23
60	Khunti	62.72	Nilkanth Singh Munda	BJP	59,198	44.71	Sushil Pahan	JMM	32,871	24.83	26,327	19.88
61	Silli	77.06	Sudesh Kumar Mahto	AJSU	83,700	52.74	Seema Devi	JMM	63,505	40.01	20,195	12.73
62	Khijri	64.03	Rajesh Kachhap	INC	83,829	38.94	Ram Kumar Pahan	BJP	78,360	36.40	5,469	2.54
63	Ranchi	49.06	Chandreshwar Prasad Singh	BJP	79,646	46.77	Mahua Maji	JMM	73,742	43.31	5,904	3.46
64	Hatia	56.19	Navin Jaiswal	BJP	1,15,431	45.84	Ajay Nath Shahdeo	INC	99,167	39.38	16,264	6.46
65	Kanke	61.26	Sammari Lal	BJP	1,11,975	44.04	Suresh Kumar Baitha	INC	89,435	35.17	22,540	8.87
66	Mandar	67.58	Bandhu Tirkey	JVM	92,491	41.15	Deo Kumar Dhan	BJP	69,364	30.86	23,127	10.29
67	Sisai	68.87	Jiga Susaran Horo	JMM	93,720	57.85	Dinesh Oraon	BJP	55,302	34.14	38,418	23.71
68	Gumla	63.60	Bhushan Tirkey	JMM	67,416	47.95	Mishir Kujur	BJP	59,749	42.50	7,667	5.45
69	Bishunpur	69.81	Chamra Linda	JMM	80,864	49.19	Ashok Oraon	BJP	63,482	38.61	17,382	10.58
70	Simdega	64.68	Bhushan Bara	INC	60,651	41.47	Shradhanand Besra	BJP	60,366	41.27	285	0.20
71	Kolebira	64.71	Naman Bixal Kongari	INC	48,574	38.17	Sujan Jojo	BJP	36,236	28.47	12,338	9.70
72	Lohardaga	70.99	Rameshwar Oraon	INC	74,380	42.67	Sukhdeo Bhagat	BJP	44,230	25.37	30,150	17.30
73	Manika	63.09	Ramchandra Singh	INC	74,000	49.27	Raghupal Singh	BJP	57,760	38.46	16,240	10.81
74	Latehar	67.44	Baidyanath Ram	JMM	76,507	42.04	Prakash Ram	BJP	60,179	33.07	16,328	8.97
75	Panki	66.64	Kushwaha Shashi Bhushan Mehta	BJP	93,184	52.38	Devendra Kumar Singh	INC	55,994	31.47	37,190	20.91
76	Daltonganj	62.86	Alok Kumar Chaurasiya	BJP	1,03,698	47.57	Krishna Nand Tripathi	INC	82,181	37.70	21,517	9.87
77	Bishrampur	60.78	Ramchandra Chandravanshi	BJP	40,635	21.59	Rajesh Mehta	BSP	32,122	17.07	8,513	4.52
78	Chattarpur	61.69	Pushpa Devi	BJP	64,127	39.39	Vijay Kumar	RJD	37,335	22.93	26,792	16.46
79	Hussainabad	58.87	Kamlesh Kumar Singh	NCP	41,293	25.20	Sanjay Kumar Singh Yadav	RJD	31,444	19.19	9,849	6.01
80	Garhwa	65.54	Mithilesh Kumar Thakur	JMM	1,06,681	44.46	Satyendra Nath Tiwari	BJP	83,159	34.66	23,522	9.80
81	Bhawanathpur	67.53	Bhanu Pratap Shahi	BJP	96,818	37.89	Sogra Bibi	BSP	56,914	22.28	39,904	15.61

== Government formation ==
After the defeat of the incumbent BJP government, incumbent Chief Minister Raghubar Das tendered his resignation from the post. He tendered his resignation to Governor Draupadi Murmu.

In the evening, during the election results, JMM leader and Former Chief Minister of Jharkhand Hemant Soren addressed the media and thanked the people of Jharkhand for the mandate. He also expressed his gratitude to his alliance partners, Congress & RJD and their president, Sonia Gandhi & Lalu Prasad Yadav respectively.

The next day on 24 December 2019, the meeting of all the 30 JMM MLAs was called, in which Hemant Soren was elected as the leader of the JMM legislature group. Hemant Soren was already the leader and Chief Ministerial candidate of the UPA during the election campaign. On the very same day, Alamgir Alam was elected as the leader of the Congress Legislative Party (CLP).

After the elections, JVM(P) chief and Former Chief Minister of Jharkhand Babulal Marandi extended the support of his party to the Hemant Soren government, thus providing more strength to the government.

On 24 December 2019, Hemant Soren along with the alliance partners, met Governor Draupadi Murmu and staked claim to form the government.

== Bypolls 2019-2024 ==
Date	S.No	Constituency	MLA before election	Party before election	Elected MLA	Party after election
10	3 November 2020	Dumka	Hemant Soren	Jharkhand Mukti Morcha	Basant Soren	Jharkhand Mukti Morcha
35	3 November 2020	Bermo	Rajendra Prasad Singh	Indian National Congress	Kumar Jaimangal (Anup Singh)	Indian National Congress
13	17 April 2021	Madhupur	Haji Hussain Ansari	Jharkhand Mukti Morcha	Hafizul Hasan	Jharkhand Mukti Morcha
66	23 June 2022	Mandar	Bandhu Tirkey	Indian National Congress	Shilpi Neha Tirkey	Indian National Congress
23	27 February 2023	Ramgarh	Mamta Devi	Indian National Congress	Sunita Choudhary	All Jharkhand Students Union
33	5 September 2023	Dumri	Jagarnath Mahto	Jharkhand Mukti Morcha	Baby Devi	Jharkhand Mukti Morcha
31	20 May 2024	Gandey	Dr. Sarfraz Ahmad	Jharkhand Mukti Morcha	Kalpana Soren	Jharkhand Mukti Morcha

== See also ==
- 2019 Indian general election in Jharkhand
- 2019 elections in India
