= Dumka (disambiguation) =

Dumka is a city in Jharkhand, India.

Dumka may also refer to:

- Dumka (musical genre)
- Dumka district
- Dumka (community development block)
- Dumka (Vidhan Sabha constituency)
- Dumka (Lok Sabha constituency)
