= Pathalgadi movement =

Sovereignty movement in Jharkhand, India

The Pathalgadi movement was started by tribals in Khunti district of Jharkhand as a resistance movement to assert their rights, including the right to sovereign territory. Pathalgadi literally translates to 'carving a stone'. On these stones orders would be carved by the tribals, orders such as restricting the entry of outsiders.

== About ==
Tribals from Scheduled Tribes in Jharkhand would sometimes erect engraved stones in times of birth or death. This tradition took on a new shape with the passage of the Panchayats (Extension to Scheduled Areas) Act, 1996 (PESA Act). Two civil servants started erecting stones with the PESA Act and Fifth Schedule of the Constitution of India on them, so as to spread awareness among the tribals about their rights. Essentially, the stones were taken to indicate self-rule, demarcate sovereign territory and prohibit entry of outsiders. An example of what is written on one of the slabs:

English translation of the declaration on the slab

1 By Article 13 (3)(a) of the Constitution of India, custom or tradition is the force of law (i.e., power of constitution)
2 By Article 19(5) prohibition is imposed on entry of outside or non-custom individuals to freely roam, reside, stay or settle in fifth schedule district of area.
3 By the constitution of India Article 19(6) prohibition is laid on outside to carry trade, business and seek employment in this area.
4 Under the fifth schedule area or districts according to Article 244(1) part (b) para (5)(1) no general law of centre or state is applicable.

— By Orders, Gram Sabha - Bhandra

The words on the slab are not a direct representation of the meaning as is conveyed in the Indian Constitution. These slabs were initially erected in four districts of Jharkhand - Khunti, Gumla, Simdega and West Singhbhum.

== History ==
In May 2016, the central government introduced two ordinances which enabled transfer of tribal land to the government as well as for commercial purposes. Following this the Pathalgadi movement regained prominence to fight for the tribal Jal-Jungle-Jameen (water-forest-land) and new stones were erected. The first tribal villages to start the practice were in Khunti district, the birthplace Birsa Munda. The ordinances had to be withdrawn. The tribals behind the movement also boycotted the 2019 Indian general election.

=== Tribal land law amendement bills ===
In 2016–2017, the Raghubar Das ministry was seeking amendments to the Chhotanagpur Tenancy Act, 1908. and the Santhal Pargana Tenancy Act, 1949. These two original laws had safeguarded the rights of the tribal communities on their land. According to the existing laws the land transactions could only be done between the tribals. The new amendments gave the tribals the right to allow the government to make commercial use of the tribal land and to take the tribal land on lease. The proposed bill amending the existing law had been approved by the Jharkhand Legislative Assembly. The bills were sent to Murmu for approval in November 2016.

The tribal people had strongly objected to the proposed law. During the Pathalgardi movement, protests were held against the proposed amendments to the tenancy acts. In one incident the protests turned violent and the tribals abducted the security detail of the BJP MP Karia Munda. Police responded with a violent crackdown on the tribals that caused the death of a tribal man. Criminal cases were filed against more than 200 people including the tribal rights activist Father Stan Swamy. Murmu, was criticized for her soft stand on police aggression against tribals during the movement. According to woman tribal rights activist Aloka Kujur she was expected to speak up to the government in support of the tribals but it did not happen, and instead she appealed to the Pathalgarhi agitation leaders to repose faith in the constitution.

Murmu had received total of 192 memorandums against the amendments in the bill. Then opposition leader Hemant Soren had said that the BJP government wanted to acquire tribal land through the two amendment Bills for the benefit of corporates. Opposition parties Jharkhand Mukti Morcha, the Indian National Congress, the Jharkhand Vikas Morcha and others had put intense pressure against the bill. On 24 May 2017, Murmu relented and refused to give assent to the bills and returned the bill to the state government along with the memorandums she had received. The bill was later withdrawn in August 2017.

=== Continuation of movement ===
In 2018, a list of demands had been sent to various officials, including the Indian President.

However by June 2019, many of the tribals, out of fear of arrest or harassment, have moved away from the movement. In blocks such as Khunti, Arki and Murhu, nearly 10% of the population was booked. People's Liberation Front of India (PLFI) leaders associated with the movement had been arrested, thousands of tribals were arrested and FIRs filed against at least 14000 people. Some people were booked for sedition. Among the leaders included Father Alfonso Aind, charged in the Kochang gang rape incident, which had been carried out as revenge against women who dared to enter a Pathalgadi village for the purpose of spreading awareness about human trafficking. While the movement has faded away in a number of areas, in some places like Garhwa village in Khunti it continues.

However in early 2020, seven people were beheaded in violence related to the movement. An opium cultivation connection as well as a Maoist connection has been described in the Indian media. Media coverage of the movement, though expansive, is critical, and considers the movement "anti-development". "Samu Oreya, Birsa Oreya and Babita Kacchap involved in Pathalghadi movement in Jharkhand were detained in Gujarat. They were trying to incite people in Vyara and Mahisagar against the government", the Gujarat Anti-Terrorist Squad (ATS) said in a statement. "They were trying to incite people against the present government in Gujarat's Vyara and Mahisagar. They were inciting people of Satipati community," said ATS. The special force also said that they were trying to raise money for the Pathalgadi movement.
