= Dumka Lok Sabha constituency =

Lok Sabha constituency in Jharkhand

Coordinates: 24.3°N 87.3°E

Dumka JH-2
- Lok Sabha constituency
- Interactive Map Outlining Dumka Lok Sabha constituency

Constituency details
- Country: India
- Region: East India
- State: Jharkhand
- Assembly constituencies: Sikaripara; Nala; Jamtara; Dumka; Jama; Sarath
- Established: 1952
- Reservation: ST

Member of Parliament
- 18th Lok Sabha
- Incumbent Nalin Soren
- Party: JMM
- Alliance: INDIA
- Elected year: 2024
- Preceded by: Sunil Soren

Dumka Lok Sabha constituency is one of the 14 Lok Sabha (parliamentary) constituencies in Jharkhand state in eastern India.

This constituency is reserved for the candidates belonging to the Scheduled tribes. This constituency covers the entire Jamtara district and parts of Dumka and Deoghar districts.

== Assembly segments ==
Dumka Lok Sabha constituency comprises the following six Vidhan Sabha (legislative assembly) segments:

#	Name	District	Member	Party	2024 Lead
7	Sikaripara (ST)	Dumka	Alok Kumar Soren	JMM	JMM
8	Nala	Jamtara	Rabindra Nath Mahato	JMM	BJP
9	Jamtara	Jamtara	Irfan Ansari	INC	JMM
10	Dumka (ST)	Dumka	Basant Soren	JMM	BJP
11	Jama (ST)	Dumka	Lois Marandi	JMM	BJP
14	Sarath	Deoghar	Uday Shankar Singh	JMM	BJP

== Members of Parliament ==
Year	Name	Party
1951	Bhagwat Jha Azad (Note: Purnea-Santhal seat)	Indian National Congress
1951	Paul Jujhar Soren (Note: Purnea-Santhal seat)	Jharkhand Party
1957	Suresh Chandra Chudhury	Jharkhand Party
1957	Debi Soren	Jharkhand Party
1962	S. C. Besra	Indian National Congress
1967	S. C. Besra	Indian National Congress
1971	S. C. Besra	Indian National Congress
1977	Bateshwar Hembram	Janata Party
1980	Shibu Soren	Independent politician
1984	Prithvi Chand Kisku	Indian National Congress
1989	Shibu Soren	Jharkhand Mukti Morcha
1991	Shibu Soren	Jharkhand Mukti Morcha
1996	Shibu Soren	Jharkhand Mukti Morcha
1998	Babulal Marandi	Bharatiya Janata Party
1999	Babulal Marandi	Bharatiya Janata Party
2002^	Shibu Soren	Jharkhand Mukti Morcha
2004	Shibu Soren	Jharkhand Mukti Morcha
2009	Shibu Soren	Jharkhand Mukti Morcha
2014	Shibu Soren	Jharkhand Mukti Morcha
2019	Sunil Soren	Bharatiya Janata Party
2024	Nalin Soren	Jharkhand Mukti Morcha

== Election results ==
=== 2024 ===
2024 Indian general election: Dumka
Party	Candidate	Votes	%	±%
JMM	Nalin Soren	547,370	46.23	▲3.60
BJP	Sita Soren	5,24,843	44.32	▼2.94
JBKSS (Ind.)	Baby Lata Tudu	19,360	1.80	New
CPI	Rajesh Kumar Kisku	11,506	0.97	New
NOTA	None of the above	4,526	0.38	▼1.02
Majority		22,527	1.91	▼2.72
Turnout		11,85,151	74.44	
JMM gain from BJP		Swing		

=== 2019 ===
2019 Indian general elections: Dumka
Party	Candidate	Votes	%	±%
BJP	Sunil Soren	484,923	47.26	+14.4
JMM	Shibu Soren	4,37,333	42.63	+5.44
CPI(M)	Senapati Murmu	16,157	1.57	
AITC	Arjun Pujhar	14,804	1.54	
NOTA	None of the above	14,396	1.40	
Majority		47,590	4.63	
Turnout		10,25,981	73.43	
BJP gain from JMM		Swing		

=== 2014 ===
2014 Indian general elections: Dumka
Party	Candidate	Votes	%	±%
JMM	Shibu Soren	335,815	37.19	
BJP	Sunil Soren	2,96,785	32.86	▲0.32
JVM(P)	Babulal Marandi	1,58,122	17.51	
CPI(M)	Chhaya Kole	26,442	2.93	
NOTA	None of the above	18,325	2.03	
Majority		39,030	4.32	
Turnout		9,03,062	70.94	
JMM hold		Swing		

=== 2009 ===
2009 Indian general elections: Dumka
Party	Candidate	Votes	%	±%
JMM	Shibu Soren	208,518	33.52	
BJP	Sunil Soren	1,89,706	30.50	
JVM(P)	Ramesh Hembrom	64,528	10.37	
CPI	Pashupati Kole	24,620	3.96	
Majority		18,812		
Turnout		6,22,012	55.13	
JMM hold		Swing		

=== 2004 ===
2004 Indian general elections: Dumka
Party	Candidate	Votes	%	±%
JMM	Shibu Soren	339,542	33.52	
BJP	Sonelal Hembrom	2,24,527	30.50	
Majority		1,15,015		
Turnout		6,25,118	55.13	
JMM gain from BJP		Swing		

=== 1999 ===
1999 Indian general elections: Dumka
Party	Candidate	Votes	%	±%
BJP	Babulal Marandi	201,141	36.87	
JMM	Rupi Soren Kisku	1,96,493	36.02	
INC	Ramesh Hembram	1,34,625	24.68	
Majority		4,648	4.32	
Turnout		5,45,500	58.26	
BJP hold		Swing		

=== 1998 ===
1998 Indian general election: Dumka
Party	Candidate	Votes	%	±%
BJP	Babulal Marandi	277,334	47.01	
JMM	Shibu Soren	2,64,778	44.88	
CPI	Kaleshwar Hembram	25,550	4.32	
Majority		12,556		
Turnout		5,89,933	63.23	
BJP gain from JMM		Swing		

=== 1996 ===
1996 Indian general election: Dumka
Party	Candidate	Votes	%	±%
JMM	Shibu Soren	165,411	31.94	
BJP	Babulal Marandi	1,59,933	30.89	
JD	Basudev Besra	1,36,244	26.31	
INC	Thakur Tudu	34,524	6.67	
Majority		5,478		
Turnout		5,17,803	55.66	
JMM hold		Swing		

=== 1991 ===
1991 Indian general election: Dumka
Party	Candidate	Votes	%	±%
JMM	Shibu Soren	260,169	58.28	
BJP	Babulal Marandi	1,26,528	28.34	
INC	Set Hamraj	40,962	9.18	
Majority		1,33,641		
Turnout		4,46,415	52.16	
JMM hold		Swing		

=== 1989 ===
1989 Indian general election: Dumka
Party	Candidate	Votes	%	±%
JMM	Shibu Soren	247,502	60.97	
INC	Prithvi Chand Kisku	1,37,901	33.97	
Majority		1,09,601		
Turnout		4,05,964	47.90	
JMM gain from INC		Swing		

=== 1984 ===
1984 Indian general election: Dumka
Party	Candidate	Votes	%	±%
INC	Prithvi Chand Kisku	199,722	53.89	
JMM	Shibu Soren	1,02,535	27.67	
CPI	Basudeo Besra	56,245	15.18	
Majority		97,187		
Turnout		3,70,588	53.78	
INC gain from JMM		Swing		

=== 1980 ===
1980 Indian general election: Dumka
Party	Candidate	Votes	%	±%
Independent	Shibu Soren	112,160	37.55	
INC(I)	Prithvi Chand Kisku	1,08,647	36.37	
JP	Bateshwar Hembram	37,084	12.41	
CPI	Satrudhan Besra	36,246	12.13	
Majority		3,513		
Turnout		2,98,721	48.10	
Independent gain from JP		Swing		

=== 1977 ===
1977 Indian general election: Dumka
Party	Candidate	Votes	%	±%
JP	Bateshwar Hembram	115,386	49.45	
INC	Prithvi Chand Kisku	62,132	26.63	
CPI	Satrughan Besra	38,655	16.57	
Majority		53,254		
Turnout		2,33,333	41.42	
JP gain from INC		Swing		

=== 1971 ===
1971 Indian general election: Dumka
Party	Candidate	Votes	%	±%
INC	Satya Charan Besra	56,888	35.41	
CPI	Satrughan Besra	46,804	29.13	
ABJS	Bateshwar Hembram	26,470	16.47	
Independent	Shibu Murmu	21,560	13.42	
Majority		10,084		
Turnout		1,60,670	31.60	
INC hold		Swing		

=== 1967 ===
1967 Indian general election: Dumka
Party	Candidate	Votes	%	±%
INC	Satya Charan Besra	60,108	38.83	
CPI	B. Marandi	48,068	31.05	
ABJS	C. Soren	19,258	12.44	
Independent	H. Tudu	16,553	10.69	
Majority		12,040		
Turnout		1,54,814	33.91	
INC hold		Swing		

=== 1962 ===
1962 Indian general election: Dumka
Party	Candidate	Votes	%	±%
INC	Satya Charan Besra	50,430	37.73	
Jharkhand Party	Debi Soren	49,345	36.92	
Independent	Satrughan Besra	33,868	25.34	
Majority		1,085		
Turnout		1,33,643	35.28	
INC gain from Jharkhand Party		Swing		

=== 1957 ===
1957 Indian general election: Dumka
Party	Candidate	Votes	%	±%
Jharkhand Party	Suresh Chandra Chudhury	148,888	25.57	
INC	Bhagwat Jha Azad	96,772	16.62	
Majority		52,116		
Turnout		5,82,379	38.81	
Jharkhand Party gain from INC		Swing		

1957 Indian general election: Dumka
Party	Candidate	Votes	%	±%
Jharkhand Party	Debi Soren	133,244	22.88	
INC	Lal Hembram	87,529	15.03	
Majority		45,715		
Turnout		5,82,379	38.81	
Jharkhand Party gain from INC		Swing		
