= First Hemant Soren ministry =

Ministers in Government of Jharkhand headed by Chief Minister Hemant Soren

- Ministry of the State of Jharkhand
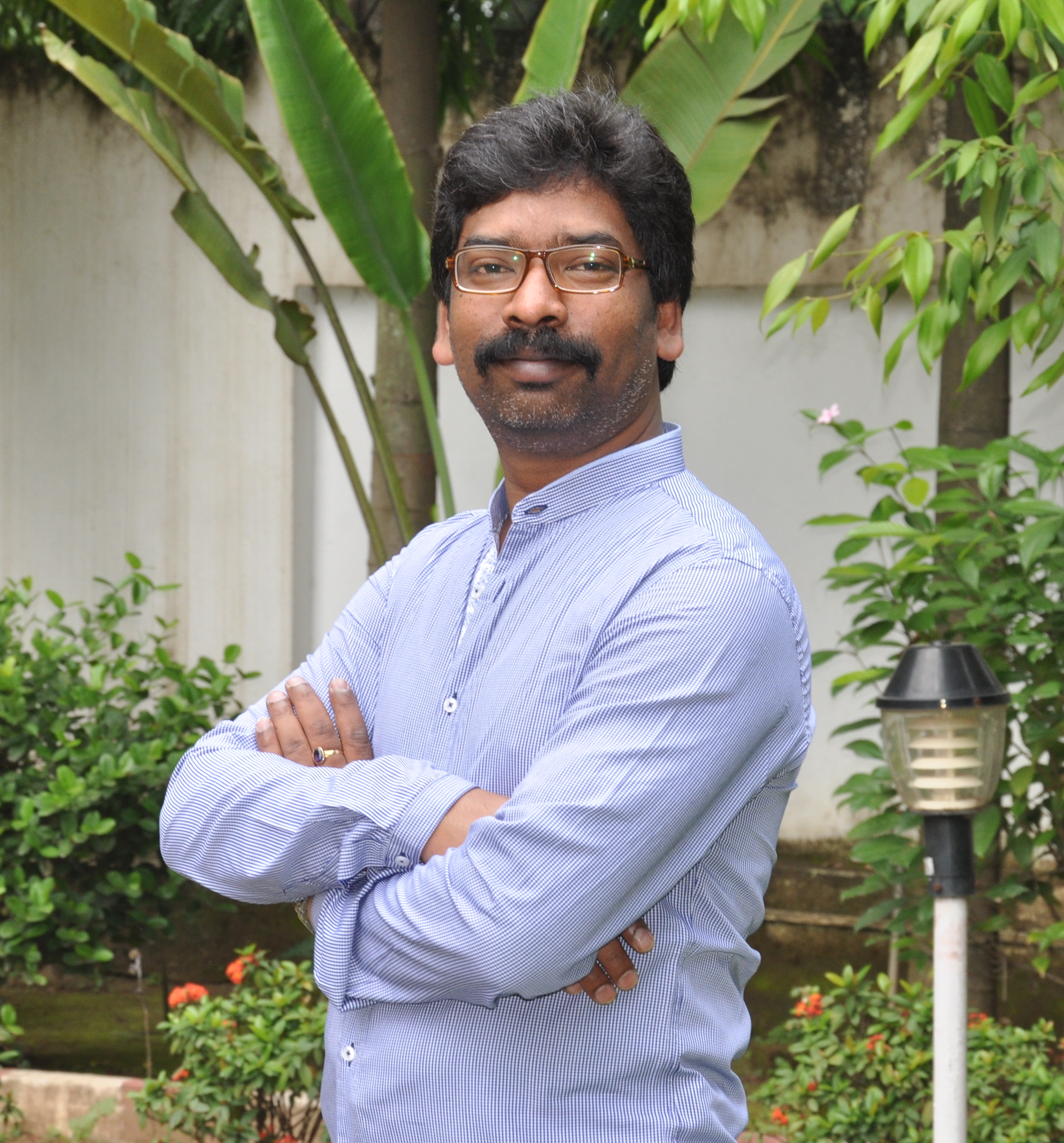
- Hemant Soren; Hon'ble Chief Minister of Jharkhand
- Date formed: 13 July 2013
- Date dissolved: 28 December 2014

People and organisations
- Head of state: Syed Ahmed
- Head of government: Hemant Soren
- Total no. of members: 12
- Status in legislature: Coalition
- Opposition party: NDA
- Opposition leader: Arjun Munda , BJP

History
- Outgoing election: 2009
- Legislature term: 5 years (Unless sooner dissolved)
- Predecessor: President's rule
- Successor: Raghubar Das ministry

This is a list of ministers from First Hemant Soren cabinet starting from 13 July 2013 to 28 December 2014. Hemant Soren is a politician belonging to the Jharkhand Mukti Morcha, and was sworn in as the Chief Minister of Jharkhand on 13 July 2013.

On 13 July 2013, Rajendra Prasad Singh of Indian National Congress and Annpurna Devi of Rashtriya Janata Dal were sworn in as cabinet ministers along with Hemant Soren as Chief Minister.

== Ministers ==
SI No.	Name	Constituency	Department	Party	Termstart	Termend
1.	Hemant Soren; Chief Minister	Dumka		Jharkhand Mukti Morcha	13 July 2013	28 December 2014
2.	Rajendra Prasad Singh	Bermo		Indian National Congress	13 July 2013	28 December 2014
3.	Annpurna Devi	Kodarma	• Irrigation • Women and Child Welfare	Rashtriya Janata Dal	13 July 2013	28 December 2014
4.	Haji Hussain Ansari	Madhupur		Jharkhand Mukti Morcha	4 August 2013	28 December 2014
5.	Jai Prakash Bhai Patel	Mandu		Jharkhand Mukti Morcha	4 August 2013	28 December 2014
6.	Simon Marandi	Litipara		Jharkhand Mukti Morcha	4 August 2013	28 December 2014
7.	Champai Soren	Seraikella	Food and Civil Supplies; Transport	Jharkhand Mukti Morcha	4 August 2013	28 December 2014
8.	Geeta Shree Oraon	Sisai		Indian National Congress	4 August 2013	28 December 2014
9.	Suresh Paswan	Deoghar		Rashtriya Janata Dal	4 August 2013	28 December 2014
10.	Chandra Shekhar Dubey	Bishrampur	Rural development; Panchayati Raj; Labour & Employment; Training	Indian National Congress	24 August 2013	28 December 2014
11.	Mannan Mallick	Dhanbad	Animal Husbandry; Fisheries; Disaster Management	Indian National Congress	24 August 2013	28 December 2014
12.	Yogendra Sao	Barkagaon	Agriculture; Housing	Indian National Congress	24 August 2013	28 December 2014

== See also ==
- Government of Jharkhand
- Jharkhand Legislative Assembly
- Arjun Munda third ministry
- Raghubar Das ministry
- Second Hemant Soren ministry
- Third Hemant Soren ministry
