= Jama Assembly constituency =

Jama
- Constituency No. 11 for the Jharkhand Legislative Assembly

Constituency details
- Country: India
- Region: East India
- State: Jharkhand
- District: Dumka
- Lok Sabha constituency: Dumka
- Established: 2000
- Total electors: 2,05,913
- Reservation: ST

Member of Legislative Assembly
- 6th Jharkhand Legislative Assembly
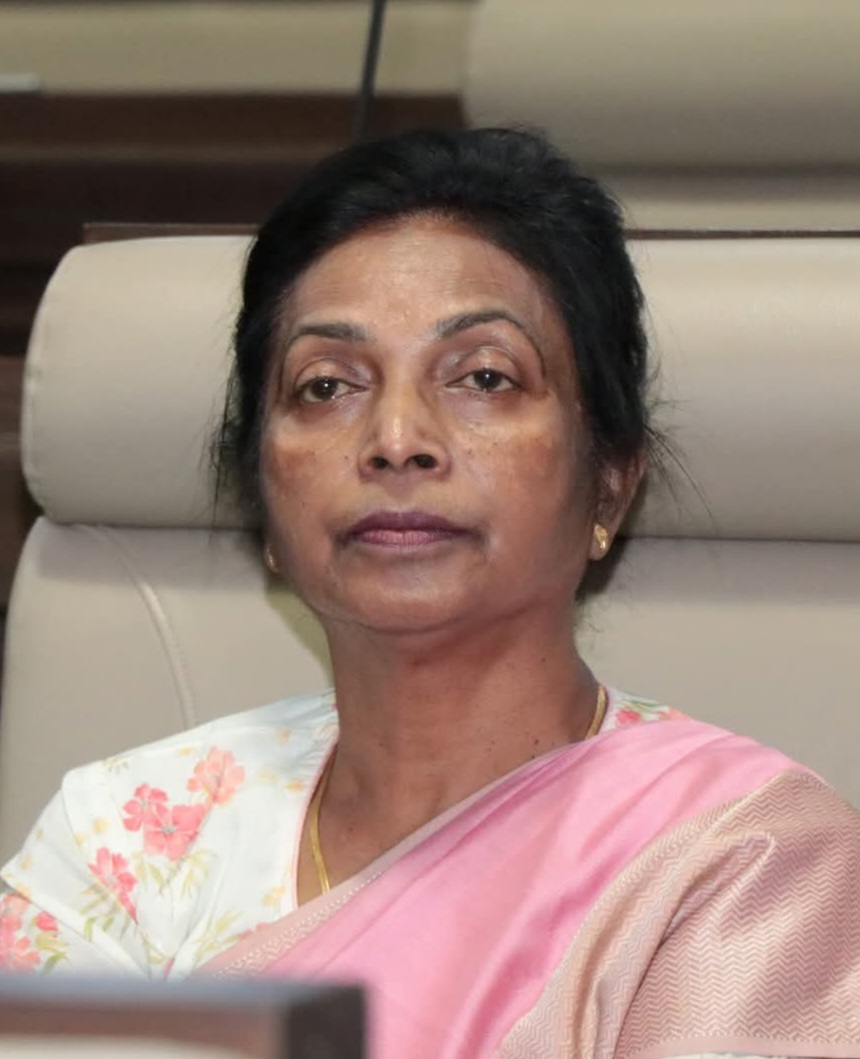
- Incumbent Louis Marandi
- Party: JMM
- Alliance: MGB
- Elected year: 2024

Jama Assembly constituency is an assembly constituency in the Indian state of Jharkhand.

== Overview ==
Jama Assembly constituency covers: Jama and Ramgarh Police Stations in Dumka district.

This seat is reserved for Scheduled Tribes.

Jama Assembly constituency is part of Dumka (Lok Sabha constituency).

== Members of the Legislative Assembly ==
Election	Member	Party
Bihar Legislative Assembly
Before 1967: Constituency did not exist
1967	M. Hansda	Independent politician
1969	Madan Besra	Indian National Congress
1972	Madan Besra	Indian National Congress
1977	Madan Besra	Indian National Congress
1980	Dewan Soren	Jharkhand Mukti Morcha
1985	Shibu Soren	Jharkhand Mukti Morcha
1990	Mohril Murmu	Jharkhand Mukti Morcha
1995	Durga Soren	Jharkhand Mukti Morcha
2000	Durga Soren	Jharkhand Mukti Morcha
Jharkhand Legislative Assembly
2005	Sunil Soren	Bharatiya Janata Party
2009	Sita Soren	Jharkhand Mukti Morcha
2014	Sita Soren	Jharkhand Mukti Morcha
2019	Sita Soren	Jharkhand Mukti Morcha
2024	Louis Marandi	Jharkhand Mukti Morcha

== Election results ==
=== Assembly Election 2024 ===
2024 Jharkhand Legislative Assembly election: Jama
Party	Candidate	Votes	%	±%
JMM	Louis Marandi	76,424	46.89	▲4.46
BJP	Suresh Murmu	70,686	43.37	▲2.63
Independent	Rasik Murmu	2,811	1.72	New
Independent	Polina Murmu	2,067	1.27	New
CPI(M)	Sanatan Dehri	1,677	1.03	New
Independent	Rajeev Basky	1,481	0.91	New
BSP	Shailendra Hembram	956	0.59	New
NOTA	None of the Above	679	0.42	▼0.75
Margin of victory		5,738	3.52	▲1.83
Turnout		1,62,973	72.40	▲2.66
Registered electors		2,25,112		▲9.32
JMM hold		Swing	▲4.46	

=== Assembly Election 2019 ===
2019 Jharkhand Legislative Assembly election: Jama
Party	Candidate	Votes	%	±%
JMM	Sita Soren	60,925	42.43	▲2.63
BJP	Suresh Murmu	58,499	40.74	▲2.66
JVM(P)	Arjun Marandi	5,897	4.11	▼2.82
Independent	Bonel Kisku	4,152	2.89	New
AJSU	Steffy Teresa Murmu	3,351	2.33	New
Independent	Manuel Murmu	2,509	1.75	New
Independent	Barish Murmu	1,330	0.93	New
NOTA	Nota	1,671	1.16	▼0.17
Margin of victory		2,426	1.69	▼0.03
Turnout		1,43,591	69.73	▼1.74
Registered electors		2,05,913		▲10.01
JMM hold		Swing	▲2.63	

=== Assembly Election 2014 ===
2014 Jharkhand Legislative Assembly election: Jama
Party	Candidate	Votes	%	±%
JMM	Sita Soren	53,250	39.80	▲0.47
BJP	Suresh Murmu	50,944	38.08	▲11.71
JVM(P)	Sukh Lal Soren	9,263	6.92	New
Independent	Bhola Nath Grihi	3,688	2.76	New
INC	Marshal Marandi	2,320	1.73	▼11.48
Independent	Bonel Kisku	2,170	1.62	New
Independent	Raska Soren	1,637	1.22	New
NOTA	None of the Above	1,786	1.33	New
Margin of victory		2,306	1.72	▼11.24
Turnout		1,33,785	71.48	▲11.32
Registered electors		1,87,170		▲14.88
JMM hold		Swing	▲0.47	

=== Assembly Election 2009 ===
2009 Jharkhand Legislative Assembly election: Jama
Party	Candidate	Votes	%	±%
JMM	Sita Soren	38,550	39.33	▲0.05
BJP	Manoj Kumar Singh	25,844	26.37	▼19.87
INC	Sushil Marandi	12,948	13.21	New
RJD	Vijaya Pahan	2,323	2.37	▼2.09
Independent	Paneshal Tudu	1,886	1.92	New
Loktantrik Samata Dal	Lukhi Ram Tudu	1,572	1.60	New
AITC	English Marandi	1,424	1.45	New
Margin of victory		12,706	12.96	▲6.01
Turnout		98,013	60.16	▲2.75
Registered electors		1,62,923		▼1.86
JMM gain from BJP		Swing	▼6.91	

=== Assembly Election 2005 ===
2005 Jharkhand Legislative Assembly election: Jama
Party	Candidate	Votes	%	±%
BJP	Sunil Soren	44,073	46.24	▲16.30
JMM	Durga Soren	37,443	39.29	▼9.67
RJD	Manoj Kumar Singh	4,254	4.46	New
BSP	Sumanti Manjhi	2,410	2.53	New
Independent	Sona Murmu	2,061	2.16	New
Independent	Siril Soren	1,421	1.49	New
Independent	Kaleshwar Soren	896	0.94	New
Margin of victory		6,630	6.96	▼12.05
Turnout		95,308	57.41	▲0.66
Registered electors		1,66,017		▲12.04
BJP gain from JMM		Swing	▼2.71	

=== Assembly Election 2000 ===
2000 Bihar Legislative Assembly election: Jama
Party	Candidate	Votes	%	±%
JMM	Durga Soren	41,165	48.95	New
BJP	Rabindra Marandi	25,179	29.94	New
INC	Mohril Murmu	17,379	20.67	New
Margin of victory		15,986	19.01	
Turnout		84,092	57.71	
Registered electors		1,48,175		
JMM win (new seat)				

== See also ==
- Jama
- Ramgarh
- Jharkhand Legislative Assembly
- List of states of India by type of legislature
