= Durga Soren =

Indian politician 1970-2009)

Member of Jharkhand Legislative Assembly
- In office 2000–2005
- Preceded by: Constituency established
- Succeeded by: Sunil Soren
- Constituency: Jama

Member of Bihar Legislative Assembly
- In office 1995–2000
- Preceded by: Mohril Murmu
- Succeeded by: Constituency abolished

Personal details
- Born: 10 September 1970 Ramgarh, Jharkhand, India
- Died: 21 May 2009 (aged 38) Bokaro, Jharkhand, India
- Party: Jharkhand Mukti Morcha
- Spouse: Sita Soren
- Relations: Hemant Soren (brother); Basant Soren (brother); Anjali Soren (sister)
- Children: 3 (Jayshree, Rajshree and Vijayshree)
- Parent: Shibu Soren (father)

Durga Soren (10 September 1970 – 21 May 2009) was an Indian politician belonging to the Jharkhand Mukti Morcha and a former member of Jharkhand Legislative Assembly. He was the son of JMM chief Shibu Soren and the husband of Sita Soren, who was a Member of Jharkhand Legislative Assembly from Jama constituency. He was also the elder brother of Hemant Soren, the current Chief Minister of Jharkhand.

Durga Soren was elected as a Member of Legislative Assembly from Jama constituency from 1995 to 2000. He lost in the 2005 assembly poll to Sunil Soren of Bharatiya Janata Party. He also contested election from Godda constituency for Lok Sabha but lost to Nishikant Dubey of Bharatiya Janata Party.

He died at his Bokaro residence in his sleep on 21 May 2009. The cause of death was termed as a brain haemorrhage. He is survived by his parents Shibu and Roopi, wife Sita Soren and three daughters, Jayshree Soren, Rajshree Soren and Vijayshree Soren.
