= Bateshwar Hembram =

Indian politician (1931–2018)

Member of Parliament, Lok Sabha
- In office 1977–1980
- Preceded by: S. C. Besra
- Succeeded by: Shibu Soren
- Constituency: Dumka

Personal details
- Born: 30 April 1931
- Died: 13 October 2018 (aged 87)
- Party: Janata Party
- Spouse: Sonamani Murmu

Bateshwar Hembram (30 April 1931 – 13 October 2018) was an Indian politician. He was a Member of Parliament, representing Dumka in the Lok Sabha the lower house of India's Parliament as a member of the Indian National Congress.
