= Shibu Soren =

Indian politician (1944–2025)

- ᱥᱤᱵᱩ ᱥᱚᱨᱮᱱ
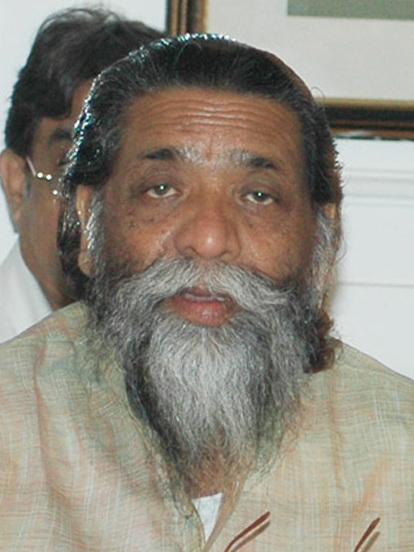
- Soren in 2006

Member of Parliament, Rajya Sabha
- In office 22 June 2020 – 4 August 2025
- Preceded by: Prem Chand Gupta
- Constituency: Jharkhand
- In office 10 April 2002 – 2 June 2002
- Constituency: Jharkhand
- In office 8 July 1998 – 18 July 2001
- Constituency: Jharkhand

3rd Chief Minister of Jharkhand
- In office 30 December 2009 – 31 May 2010
- Governor: K. Sankaranarayanan; M. O. H. Farook
- Preceded by: President's rule
- Succeeded by: President's rule
- In office 27 August 2008 – 18 January 2009
- Governor: Syed Sibtey Razi
- Preceded by: Madhu Koda
- Succeeded by: President's rule
- In office 2 March 2005 – 12 March 2005
- Governor: Syed Sibtey Razi
- Preceded by: Arjun Munda
- Succeeded by: Arjun Munda

Union Minister of Coal
- In office 29 January 2006 – 28 November 2006
- Prime Minister: Manmohan Singh
- Preceded by: Manmohan Singh
- Succeeded by: Manmohan Singh
- In office 27 November 2004 – 2 March 2005
- Prime Minister: Manmohan Singh
- Preceded by: Manmohan Singh
- Succeeded by: Manmohan Singh
- In office 23 May 2004 – 24 July 2004
- Prime Minister: Manmohan Singh
- Preceded by: Mamata Banerjee
- Succeeded by: Manmohan Singh

Member of Parliament, Lok Sabha
- In office 2002 – 23 May 2019
- Preceded by: Babulal Marandi
- Succeeded by: Sunil Soren
- Constituency: Dumka, Jharkhand
- In office 1 December 1989 – 5 March 1998
- Preceded by: Prithvi Chand Kisku
- Succeeded by: Babulal Marandi
- Constituency: Dumka, Jharkhand
- In office 18 January 1980 – 31 December 1984
- Preceded by: Babulal Marandi
- Succeeded by: Prithvi Chand Kisku
- Constituency: Dumka, Jharkhand

President of Jharkhand Mukti Morcha
- In office 1987 – 15 April 2025
- Preceded by: Binod Bihari Mahato
- Succeeded by: Hemant Soren

Personal details
- Born: 11 January 1944 Nemra, Bihar Province, British India (present-day Jharkhand, India)
- Died: 4 August 2025 (aged 81) Delhi, India
- Party: Jharkhand Mukti Morcha
- Spouse: Roopi Soren (m. 1962)
- Children: Durga; Hemant; Basant; Anjali
- Occupation: Agriculturist; politician
- Nickname: "Dishom Guru"
- As of 25 September, 2006

Shibu Soren (Hindi pronunciation: [ʃɪbuː soːɾeːn̪]; 11 January 1944 – 4 August 2025), popularly known as the Dishom Guru, was an Indian politician who was a founder and longtime president of the Jharkhand Mukti Morcha (JMM). He played a crucial role in the formation of the separate state of Jharkhand from Bihar and later served as the 3rd Chief Minister of Jharkhand, first for 10 days in March 2005, then from 2008 to 2009, and again from 2009 to 2010.

Soren was a Member of Parliament, Lok Sabha from Dumka from 1980 to 1984, 1989 to 1998, and 2002 to 2019. He was also a member of the Rajya Sabha, representing Jharkhand from 2020 until his death in 2025. He also served as the Minister for Coal in the Union Cabinet three times: in 2004, from 2004 to 2005, and in 2006. However, he was convicted by a Delhi district court of his involvement in the 1994 murder of his private secretary, Shashi Nath Jha. He had also been indicted in the past on other criminal charges.

== Political career ==
Soren entered activism following the murder of his father, Shobaran Soren, on 27 November 1957. His father was a teacher and tribal activist who worked on tribal land rights issues. At the age of eighteen, Soren founded the Santhal Navyuvak Sangh. In 1972, Bengali Marxist trade union leader A. K. Roy, Kurmi-Mahato leader Binod Bihari Mahato and Santal leader Shibu Soren formed Jharkhand Mukti Morcha. Soren became the general secretary of JMM. JMM organised agitations to reclaim the tribal lands which were alienated. They started forcibly harvesting in the lands. Shibu Soren was known for delivering summary justice against landlords and money lenders, sometimes by holding own courts. On 23 January 1975, he allegedly incited a campaign to drive away "outsiders", or the 'non-tribal' people. At least eleven people were killed. Soren and numerous others were charged with various crimes related to this incident. After extended legal proceedings, Soren was acquitted on 6 March 2008. However, possibly related incitement charges—dating from two earlier deaths in 1974—remain pending.

He entered to electoral politics as an independent candidate to the Bihar assembly elections in 1977 but lost to Janata Party candidate. Then, he was first elected to the Lok Sabha in 1980 from Dumka. An arrest warrant was issued against him. He was subsequently elected to the Lok Sabha in 1989, 1991 and 1996 as well.

In 2002, he was elected to the Rajya Sabha. He won the Dumka Lok Sabha seat in a by-election the same year and resigned his Rajya Sabha seat. He was re-elected in 2004.

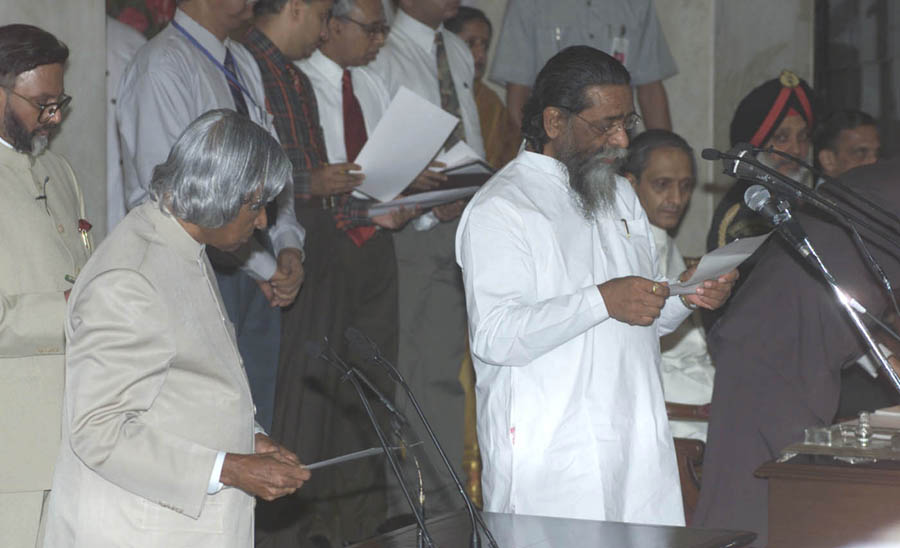
PoI A. P. J. Abdul Kalam administering oath to Soren as Union Cabinet Minister on 22 May 2004

He became the Union Coal Minister in the Manmohan Singh government, but was asked to resign following an arrest warrant in his name in the thirty-year-old Chirudih case. He was one of the main accused amongst 69, with allegations to kill 10 people (including 9 Muslims) on 23 January 1975, in a clash between tribals and Muslims. After the warrant was issued, he initially went underground. He resigned on 24 July 2004. He was able to secure bail after spending over a month in judicial custody; released on bail on 8 September, he was re-inducted into the Union Cabinet and given back the coal ministry on 27 November 2004, as part of a deal for a Congress-JMM alliance before assembly elections in Jharkhand in February/March 2005.

== Chief Minister of Jharkhand (2005–2010) ==
On 2 March 2005, after much political bargaining and quid pro quo he was invited to form the government in Jharkhand by the Governor of Jharkhand. He resigned as Chief Minister nine days later, on 11 March, following his failure to obtain a vote of confidence in the assembly.

=== Later career ===
In the 2019 Lok Sabha elections, he lost to Sunil Soren of the BJP from Dumka constituency. He didn't contest 2024 Indian Lok Sabha elections.

== Electoral history ==
=== Lok Sabha ===
Year	Constituency	Party	Votes	%	Opponent	Opponent Party	Opponent Votes	%	Result	Margin	%	Ref
2019	Dumka	JMM	437,333	42.63	Sunil Soren	BJP	484,923	47.26	Lost	-47,590	-4.63	
2014	Dumka	JMM	335,815	37.19	Sunil Soren	BJP	296,785	32.86	Won	39,030	4.33	
2009	Dumka	JMM	208,518	33.52	Sunil Soren	BJP	189,706	30.5	Won	18,812	3.02	
2004	Dumka	JMM	339,542	33.52	Sonelal Hembrom	BJP	224,527	30.5	Won	115,015	3.02	
1998	Dumka	JMM	264,778	44.88	Babulal Marandi	BJP	277,334	47.01	Lost	-12,556	-2.13	
1996	Dumka	JMM	165,411	31.94	Babulal Marandi	BJP	159,933	30.89	Won	5,478	1.05	
1991	Dumka	JMM	260,169	58.28	Babulal Marandi	BJP	126,528	28.34	Won	133,641	29.94	
1989	Dumka	JMM	247,502	60.97	Prithvi Chand Kisku	INC	137,901	33.97	Won	109,601	27	
1984	Dumka	JMM	102,535	27.67	Prithvi Chand Kisku	INC	199,722	53.89	Lost	-97,187	-26.22	
1980	Dumka	IND	112,160	37.55	Prithvi Chand Kisku	INC(I)	108,647	36.37	Won	3,513	1.18	

=== Assembly ===
Year	Constituency	Party	Votes	%	Opponent	Opponent Party	Opponent Votes	%	Result	Margin	%
2009 By-election (June)	Jamtara	JMM	42,668	35.64%	Tarun Kumar Gupta	BJP	25,036	20.91%	Won	17,632	14.73%
2009 By-election (January)	Tamar	JMM	25,154	-	Gopal Krishna Patar	JKP	25,154	-	Lost	9,062	-
1985	Jama	JMM	34,828	66.2%	Prome Murmu	INC	16,484	31.33	Won	18,344	34.87
1977	Tundi	IND	7,523	19.51	Satya Narayan Dudani	JP	16,055	41.64	Lost	-8,532	22.13

=== Rajya Sabha ===
Position	Party	Constituency	From	To	Tenure
Member of Parliament, Rajya Sabha (1st Term)	JMM	Bihar	8 July 1998	14 November 2000	2 years, 129 days
Member of Parliament, Rajya Sabha (2nd Term)	JMM	Jharkhand	15 November 2000	18 July 2001	245 days
Member of Parliament, Rajya Sabha (3rd Term)	JMM	Jharkhand	10 April 2002	2 June 2002	53 days
Member of Parliament, Rajya Sabha (4th Term)	JMM	Jharkhand	22 June 2020	21 June 2026	5 years, 364 days

== Life imprisonment and acquittal ==
On 28 November 2006, Soren was found guilty in a twelve-year-old case involving the kidnapping and murder of his former personal secretary Shashinath Jha. It was claimed that Jha was abducted from the Dhaula Kuan area in Delhi on 22 May 1994 and taken to Piska Nagari near Ranchi where he was killed. The CBI chargesheet stated that Jha's knowledge of the reported deal between the Congress and the JMM to save the Narasimha Rao government during the July 1993 no-confidence motion and an act of sodomy was the motive behind the murder. The charge-sheet asserted that: "Jha was aware of the illegal transactions and also expected and demanded a substantial share out of this amount from Soren."

Soren resigned from his post of Union Minister for Coal after Prime Minister Manmohan Singh demanded that he should do so in the wake of the verdict. This is the first case of a Union Minister of the Government of India being found guilty of involvement in a murder. On 5 December 2006, Shibu Soren was sentenced to life imprisonment. A Delhi court rejected his bail plea, stating: 'We cannot overlook the fact that the appellant (Soren) has been convicted after a detailed and elaborate trial only in November 2006 and sentenced in December 2006.

The bench also noted that he was also being tried in a number of other cases, including the case of mass murder in Jharkhand.

On 25 June 2007, Shibu Soren was being escorted to his jail in Dumka, Jharkhand when his convoy was attacked by bombs, but no one was hurt.

The Delhi High Court on 23 August 2007 overruled the District Court and acquitted Soren, stating that "The trial court's analysis is far from convincing and not sustainable."

The five men convicted by the Tis Hazari court were held guilty of criminal conspiracy, abduction and murder primarily on the basis of forensic evidence provided by a post-mortem report of a body discovered in Jharkhand, namely a skull superimposition test and skull injury report. This was in addition to eyewitness accounts and some circumstantial evidence.

== Personal life ==
Soren was born on 11 January 1944 into a Santal family to Shobaran Soren and Sonamuni Soren in Nemra village of Ramgarh district, then part of Bihar Province in British India. Shibu Soren was elder among his four brothers namely 1.Raja Ram Soren 2.Shankar Soren 3. Lalu Soren and youngest 4.Ramu Soren.He completed his matriculation at Gola High School. He completed his schooling in the same district.

Soren was married to Roopi Kisku in 1962. He had three sons Durga Soren, Hemant Soren, and Basant Soren and a daughter, Anjali Soren. His son, Hemant Soren is the Chief Minister of Jharkhand currently and was the CM previously from July 2013 to December 2014. His elder son Durga Soren was MLA from Jama from 1995 to 2005. Durga's wife, Sita Soren is former MLA from Jama, but is now in BJP. Basant Soren is president of the Jharkhand Yuva Morcha, a youth wing of Jharkhand Mukti Morcha and current MLA from Dumka.

== Death ==
Soren died at Sir Ganga Ram Hospital in Delhi, on 4 August 2025, at the age of 81. He had been admitted in late June 2025 for chronic kidney disease, and reportedly suffered a stroke during his treatment. After about a month on life support, he died with his family by his bedside.

== See also ==
- Jharkhand movement

Lok Sabha
Preceded by Bateshwar Hembram	Member of Parliament for Dumka; 1980–1984	Succeeded by Prithvi Chand Kisku
Preceded by Prithvi Chand Kisku	Member of Parliament for Dumka; 1989–1998	Succeeded by Babulal Marandi
Preceded by Babulal Marandi	Member of Parliament for Dumka; 2002–2019	Succeeded by Sunil Soren
Political offices
Preceded by Arjun Munda	Chief Minister of Jharkhand; 2 March 2005 - 12 March 2005	Succeeded by Arjun Munda
Preceded by Madhu Koda	Chief Minister of Jharkhand; 27 August 2008 - 19 January 2009	Succeeded by President's rule
Preceded by President's rule	Chief Minister of Jharkhand; 30 December 2009 - 1 June 2010	Succeeded by President's rule
Preceded by Mamata Banerjee	Minister of Coal; 22 May 2004 - 24 July 2004	Succeeded by Manmohan Singh
Preceded by Mamata Banerjee	Minister of Mines and Minerals; 22 May 2004 - 24 July 2004	Succeeded by Manmohan Singh
Preceded by Manmohan Singh	Minister of Coal; 27 November 2004 - 2 March 2005	Succeeded by Manmohan Singh
Preceded by Manmohan Singh	Minister of Coal; 29 January 2006 - 29 November 2006	Succeeded by Manmohan Singh
Party political offices
Preceded by	Leader of the Jharkhand Mukti Morcha Party in the 16th Lok Sabha; 2014–2019	Succeeded by Vijay Kumar Hansdak
