= S. C. Besra =

Indian politician (1923–1982)

Member of Parliament, Lok Sabha
- In office 1962–1977
- Preceded by: Debi Soren
- Succeeded by: Hembram Bateshwar
- Constituency: Dumka

Personal details
- Born: 7 April 1923 Kashitarn, Santhal Parganas, Bihar, British India (presently Jharkhand, India)
- Died: 1982 (aged 58–59)
- Party: Indian National Congress
- Spouse: Chumu Tudu

Satya Chandra Besra (7 April 1923 – 1982) was an Indian politician. He was a Member of Parliament, representing Dumka in the Lok Sabha the lower house of India's Parliament as a member of the Indian National Congress.

== Early life ==
Satya Chandra was born on 7 April 1923 to Tikat Besra in the village of Kashitarn in Santhal Parganas district. He studied at J. B. C. H. E. School in Jamtara. He married Chumu Tudu with whom he had four sons and three daughters.

== Political life ==
As an Indian National Congress candidate, he was elected from the Dumka seat in 1962 and 1967 to the third and fourth Lok Sabha respectively.

== Death ==
Besra died in 1982.
