= Prithvi Chand Kisku =

Indian politician

Member of Parliament, Lok Sabha
- In office 31 December 1984 – 26 November 1989
- Preceded by: Shibu Soren
- Succeeded by: Shibu Soren
- Constituency: Dumka

Personal details
- Born: 27 February 1927 Amarpur Village, P.O Pathra, Godda District, Bihar, British India (Presently Jharkhand, India)
- Died: 18 May 2011 Amarpur Village, P.O Pathra, Godda District
- Party: Indian National Congress

Prithvi Chand Kisku (27 February 1927 – 18 May 2011) was an Indian politician. He was a member of parliament, representing Dumka in the Lok Sabha the lower house of India's Parliament as a member of the Indian National Congress.
