= Second Hemant Soren ministry =

Government of Jharkhand, India (2019–2024)

- Ministry of the State of Jharkhand
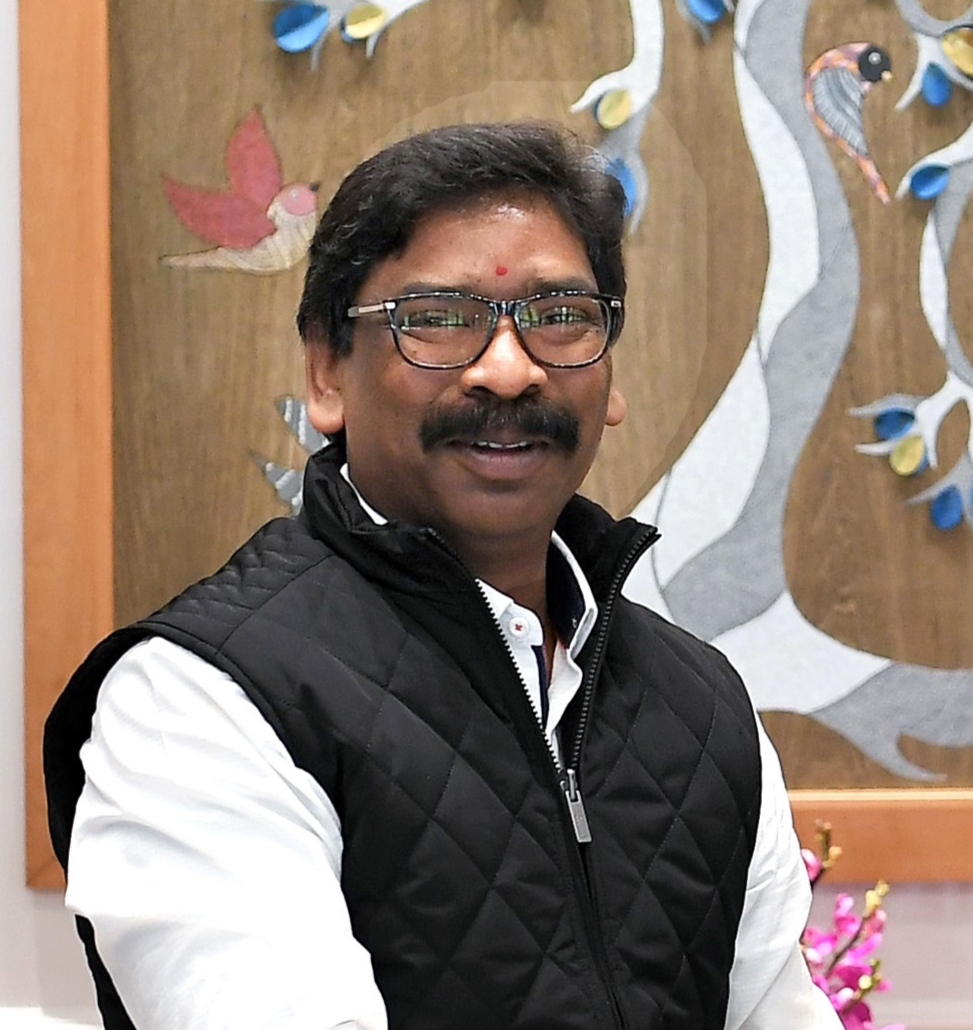
- Hemant Soren; Hon'ble Chief Minister of Jharkhand
- Date formed: 29 December 2019
- Date dissolved: 31 January 2024

People and organisations
- Head of state: C. P. Radhakrishnan
- Head of government: Hemant Soren
- Ministers removed: 2 (death)
- Total no. of members: 11
- Member parties: Government (51); Maha Gathbandhan (51): JMM (30); INC (18); RJD (1); NCP (1); CPI(ML)L (1); Opposition; NDA (30): BJP (26); AJSU (2); IND (2); Maha Gathbandhan
- Opposition party: NDA
- Opposition leader: Amar Kumar Bauri , BJP

History
- Outgoing election: 2019
- Legislature term: 5 years (Unless sooner dissolved)
- Predecessor: Raghubar Das ministry
- Successor: Champai Soren ministry

This is a list of ministers from Second Hemant Soren cabinet starting from 29 December 2019.

Hemant Soren is the leader of Jharkhand Mukti Morcha, who was sworn in the Chief Minister of Jharkhand on 29 December 2019 ended on 31 January 2024 .

In the current government, 6 ministers including the Chief Minister belongs to the Jharkhand Mukti Morcha, 4 ministers belongs to the Indian National Congress and 1 minister belongs to the Rashtriya Janata Dal.

Along with the Chief Minister, there are 11 Cabinet Ministers.

== Council of Ministers ==
S.No	Name	Constituency	Department	Party	Term of office		
1.	Hemant Soren; Chief Minister	Barhait	Ministry of Home, Jail and disaster management.; Ministry of Personnel, Administrative reforms and Raj Bhasha.; Ministry of cabinet secretariat and vigilance; Ministry of cabinet election; Ministry of Information and public relations; Ministry of Law; Ministry of Industries; Ministry of Forest, Environment and climate change; Ministry of Higher and Technical Education; Other departments not allocated to any Minister.	JMM	29 December 2019	31 January 2024	(4 years, 33 days)
Cabinet Ministers
2.	Rameshwar Oraon	Lohardaga	Ministry of Finance; Ministry of Planning and Development; Ministry of Commercial Tax; Ministry of Food, Public distribution and Consumer affairs	INC	29 December 2019	31 January 2024	(4 years, 33 days)
3.	Champai Soren	Seraikella	Ministry of Transport.; Ministry of Scheduled tribe, scheduled Caste, Minority & Backward class welfare.	JMM	28 January 2020	31 January 2024	(4 years, 3 days)
4.	Banna Gupta	Jamshedpur West	Ministry Health, Medical education & Family welfare.; Ministry of Home, Jail and Disaster management.(disaster management)	INC	28 January 2020	31 January 2024	(4 years, 3 days)
5.	Badal Patralekh	Jarmundi	Ministry of Agriculture, Animal husbandry and cooperatives	INC	28 January 2020	31 January 2024	(4 years, 3 days)
6.	Mithilesh Kumar Thakur	Garhwa	Ministry of Drinking Water and Sanitation	JMM	28 January 2020	31 January 2024	(4 years, 3 days)
7.	Satyanand Bhogta	Chatra	Ministry of Labour, Employment, Training and Skill development	RJD	29 December 2019	31 January 2024	(4 years, 33 days)
8.	Joba Majhi	Manoharpur	Ministry of Women Child development and Social Security	JMM	28 January 2020	31 January 2024	(4 years, 3 days)
9.	Alamgir Alam	Pakur	Ministry of Parliamentary Affairs.; Ministry of Rural development.	INC	29 December 2019	17 June 2024	(4 years, 33 days)
10.	Hafizul Hasan	Madhupur	Ministry of Tourism, Arts, Culture, Sports & Youth Affairs; Ministry of Minority and backward Welfare. (Minority affairs)	JMM	5 February 2021	31 January 2024	(2 years, 360 days)
11.	Baby Devi	Dumri	Ministry of Department of Excise and Prohibition	JMM	4 July 2023	31 January 2024	(211 days)

== Ministers by Party ==
Representation of cabinet ministers by party
1. Jharkhand Mukti Morcha (55.0%)
2. Indian National Congress (36.0%)
3. Rashtriya Janata Dal (9.00%)

Party	Cabinet Ministers	Total Ministers
Jharkhand Mukti Morcha	6	6
Indian National Congress	4	4
Rashtriya Janata Dal	1	1

== Former Members ==
SI No.	Name	Constituency	Department	Tenure	Party	Reason
1.	Haji Hussain Ansari	Madhupur	Minority welfare.; Registration.	28 January 2020 – 3 October 2020	JMM	Death.
2.	Jagarnath Mahto	Dumri	Ministry of School Education & its Literacy Development.; Ministry of Excise & Prohibition.	28 January 2020 – 6 April 2023	JMM	Death.
