= Debi Soren =

Indian politician

Member of Parliament, Lok Sabha
- In office 1957–1962
- Succeeded by: S. C. Besra
- Constituency: Dumka

Personal details
- Born: 1904
- Party: Jharkhand Party
- Spouse: Parbati Marandi

Debi Soren is an Indian politician. He was a Member of Parliament, representing Dumka in the Lok Sabha the lower house of India's Parliament as a member of the Jharkhand Party.
