= Dumka Assembly constituency =

Dumka
- Constituency No. 10 for the Jharkhand Legislative Assembly

Constituency details
- Country: India
- Region: East India
- State: Jharkhand
- District: Dumka
- Lok Sabha constituency: Dumka
- Established: 2000
- Total electors: 2,50,994
- Reservation: ST

Member of Legislative Assembly
- 5th Jharkhand Legislative Assembly
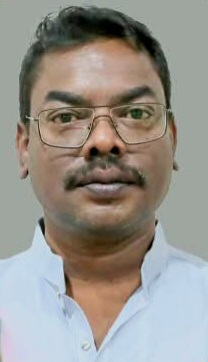
- Incumbent Basant Soren
- Party: JMM
- Alliance: MGB
- Elected year: 2024

Dumka is an assembly constituency in the Indian state of Jharkhand.

== Overview ==
Dumka Assembly constituency covers: Dumka Town, Dumka Muffassil and Masalia Police Stations in Dumka district.

This seat is reserved for Scheduled Tribes.

Dumka Assembly constituency is part of Dumka (Lok Sabha constituency).

== Members of Legislative Assembly ==
Election	Member	Party
Bihar Legislative Assembly
1952	Devi Soren	Jharkhand Party
1957	Benjamin Hansda	Jharkhand Party
1957	Sanath Rout	Jharkhand Party
1962	Paul Murmu	Janata Party
1967	G. Marandi	Bharatiya Jana Sangh
1969	Paika Murmu	Indian National Congress
1972	Paika Murmu	Indian National Congress
1977	Mahadeo Marandi	Janata Party
1980	Stephen Marandi	Jharkhand Mukti Morcha
1985	Stephen Marandi	Jharkhand Mukti Morcha
1990	Stephen Marandi	Jharkhand Mukti Morcha
1995	Stephen Marandi	Jharkhand Mukti Morcha
2000	Stephen Marandi	Jharkhand Mukti Morcha
Jharkhand Legislative Assembly
2005	Stephen Marandi	Independent politician
2009	Hemant Soren	Jharkhand Mukti Morcha
2014	Lois Marandi	Bharatiya Janata Party
2019	Hemant Soren	Jharkhand Mukti Morcha
2020^	Basant Soren	Jharkhand Mukti Morcha
2024	Basant Soren	Jharkhand Mukti Morcha

^by-election

== Election results ==
=== Assembly Election 2024 ===
2024 Jharkhand Legislative Assembly election: Dumka
Party	Candidate	Votes	%	±%
JMM	Basant Soren	95,685	51.33%	▲1.31
BJP	Sunil Soren	81,097	43.50%	▼2.27
Independent	Sushil Marandi	1,714	0.92%	New
BSP	Babu Ram Murmu	1,153	0.62%	New
NOTA	None of the Above	3,189	1.71%	▼0.57
Margin of victory		14,588	7.83%	▲3.58
Turnout		1,86,419	71.76%	▲7.59
Registered electors		2,59,784		▲3.50
JMM hold		Swing	▲1.31	

=== Assembly By-election 2020 ===
2020 Jharkhand Legislative Assembly by-election : Dumka
Party	Candidate	Votes	%	±%
JMM	Basant Soren	80,559	50.02%	▲1.16
BJP	Louis Marandi	73,717	45.77%	▲4.86
Independent	Sunita Murmu	1,864	1.16%	New
API	Dular Marandi	1,498	0.93%	New
Independent	Sanjay Tudu	838	0.52%	New
NOTA	Nota	3,665	2.28%	▲0.91
Margin of victory		6,842	4.25%	▼3.71
Turnout		1,61,050	65.62%	▼2.96
Registered electors		2,50,994		▲1.62
JMM hold		Swing	▲1.16	

=== Assembly Election 2019 ===
2019 Jharkhand Legislative Assembly election: Dumka
Party	Candidate	Votes	%	±%
JMM	Hemant Soren	81,007	48.86%	▲7.36
BJP	Louis Marandi	67,819	40.91%	▼3.74
JVM(P)	Anjula Murmu	3,156	1.90%	▼1.01
JD(U)	Marshal Rishiraj Tudu	2,409	1.45%	New
Loktantrik Janshakti Party	Ramchandra Murmu	1,530	0.92%	New
Independent	Ramcharan Singh	1,524	0.92%	New
Independent	Sanjay Tudu	1,124	0.68%	New
NOTA	Nota	2,267	1.37%	New
Margin of victory		13,188	7.96%	▲4.81
Turnout		1,65,779	67.12%	▼2.12
Registered electors		2,46,984		▲9.46
JMM gain from BJP		Swing	▲4.21	

=== Assembly Election 2014 ===
2014 Jharkhand Legislative Assembly election: Dumka
Party	Candidate	Votes	%	±%
BJP	Louis Marandi	69,760	44.65%	▲16.03
JMM	Hemant Soren	64,846	41.50%	▲10.53
JVM(P)	Bablu Kumar Murmu	4,552	2.91%	New
INC	Sagen Murmu	3,594	2.30%	▼21.73
Independent	Babu Dhan Murmu	3,514	2.25%	New
Jharkhand Party	Garjen Murmu	2,057	1.32%	New
Independent	Rajesh Besra	1,464	0.94%	New
NOTA	None of the Above	3,200	2.05%	New
Margin of victory		4,914	3.15%	▲0.79
Turnout		1,56,239	69.24%	▲10.94
Registered electors		2,25,642		▲15.99
BJP gain from JMM		Swing	▲13.68	

=== Assembly Election 2009 ===
2009 Jharkhand Legislative Assembly election: Dumka
Party	Candidate	Votes	%	±%
JMM	Hemant Soren	35,129	30.97%	▲12.64
BJP	Louis Marandi	32,460	28.62%	▼5.03
INC	Stephen Marandi	27,256	24.03%	New
CPI(M)	Subhash Hembrom	3,031	2.67%	New
AITC	Ashok Kumar Murmu	2,012	1.77%	New
Independent	Malin Hembrom	1,703	1.50%	New
BSP	Raska Soren	1,422	1.25%	▼1.16
Margin of victory		2,669	2.35%	▼2.65
Turnout		1,13,419	58.30%	▲3.47
Registered electors		1,94,533		▼0.27
JMM gain from Independent		Swing	▼7.68	

=== Assembly Election 2005 ===
2005 Jharkhand Legislative Assembly election: Dumka
Party	Candidate	Votes	%	±%
Independent	Stephen Marandi	41,340	38.65%	New
BJP	Mohril Murmu	35,993	33.65%	▲0.07
JMM	Hemant Soren	19,610	18.33%	▼27.11
BSP	Dhani Ram Tudu	2,586	2.42%	New
Independent	Sobha Murmu	1,660	1.55%	New
SP	Krishna Hansda	1,507	1.41%	New
CPI(ML)L	Wakil Hansda	831	0.78%	New
Margin of victory		5,347	5.00%	▼6.86
Turnout		1,06,954	54.83%	▼0.66
Registered electors		1,95,067		▲14.36
Independent gain from JMM		Swing	▼6.79	

=== Assembly Election 2000 ===
2000 Bihar Legislative Assembly election: Dumka
Party	Candidate	Votes	%	±%
JMM	Stephen Marandi	43,010	45.44%	New
BJP	Satish Soren	31,788	33.59%	New
INC	Ramesh Hembrom	15,755	16.65%	New
CPI	Masi Charan Hansda	2,406	2.54%	New
RJD	Vijay Kumar Soni	1,067	1.13%	New
Margin of victory		11,222	11.86%	
Turnout		94,647	56.27%	
Registered electors		1,70,567		
JMM win (new seat)				

== See also ==
- Dumka (community development block)
- Masalia
- Jharkhand Legislative Assembly
- List of states of India by type of legislature
