= Basant Soren =

Indian politician

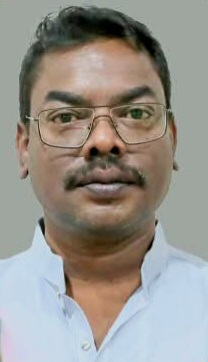
- Soren in 2024

Cabinet Minister Government of Jharkhand
- In office 16 February 2024 – 4 July 2024
- Governor: C. P. Radhakrishnan
- Chief Minister: Champai Soren
- Ministry & Departments: Road & Building Construction.; Water Resources.
- Preceded by: Hemant Soren
- Succeeded by: Hemant Soren

Member of Jharkhand Legislative Assembly
- Incumbent
- Assumed office 03 November 2020
- Preceded by: Hemant Soren
- Constituency: Dumka

President Jharkhand Yuva Morcha
- Incumbent
- Assumed office 2024
- Preceded by: Hemant Soren

Personal details
- Born: Basant Soren; 1 September 1977 (age 48) Ranchi, Jharkhand, India
- Party: Jharkhand Mukti Morcha
- Spouse: Hemlata Soren
- Relations: Hemant Soren (Brother), Kalpana Soren (Sister In Law)
- Parents: Shibu Soren (Father); Roopi Soren (Mother)
- Occupation: Politician

Basant Soren is an Indian Politician and a member of the Jharkhand Mukti Morcha political party. He is former cabinet minister for ministry of roads & buildings and construction & water resources in Government of Jharkhand and a member of Jharkhand Legislative Assembly from Dumka constituency.

Basant Soren is the younger son of JMM founder Shibu Soren and younger brother of CM Hemant Soren.

== Political career ==
Basant contested in the Rajya Sabha elections in 2016 as JMM candidate and lost. He contested in a 2020 by- election held for Dumka Assembly as a JMM candidate and defeated his nearest BJP rival Louis Marandi by a margin of 6,842 votes. Basant Soren secured 80,552 votes and Louis Marandi got 73,717 votes.

Basant Soren took oath as road & buildings construction and water resources minister in the Champai Soren-led government in Jharkhand on 16 February 2024.

== Positions held ==
1. Cabinet Minister of Road & Building Construction & Water Resources in Government of Jharkhand (2024)
2. Member of Jharkhand legislative assembly (2020 - Present)
3. President of Jharkhand Yuva Morcha (2024 - Present)
