= Sunil Soren =

Indian politician

Member of Parliament, Lok Sabha
- In office 23 May 2019 – 4 June 2024
- Preceded by: Shibu Soren
- Succeeded by: Nalin Soren
- Constituency: Dumka

Member of the Jharkhand Legislative Assembly
- In office 2005–2009
- Preceded by: Durga Soren
- Succeeded by: Sita Soren
- Constituency: Jama

Sunil Soren (Hindi pronunciation: [sʊn̪iːl soːɾeːn̪]) is an Indian politician and member of the Bharatiya Janata Party. Soren was a member of the Jharkhand Legislative Assembly from the Jama constituency in Dumka district. He was the Member of Parliament at the Lok Sabha from Dumka until the 2024 parliamentary elections. He did not partake in the 2024 elections and the seat was won by Nalin Soren of the Jharkhand Mukti Morcha for the 18th Lok Sabha session.
