= Mahagathbandhan (Jharkhand) =

- महागठबंधन; Mahagathbandhan
- Abbreviation: MGB
- Leader: Hemant Soren
- Chairman: Pradeep Yadav
- Founded: 2018; 7 Years ago
- Ideology: Majority: Socialism (Indian); Factions: Social democracy; Democratic socialism; Communism
- Political position: Big Tent; Factions: Centre, Centre-left to far-left
- Alliance: Indian National Developmental Inclusive Alliance (National)
- Seats in Rajya Sabha: 3 / 6
- Seats in Lok Sabha: 5 / 14
- Seats in Jharkhand Legislative Assembly: 56 / 81

Mahagathbandhan (transl. Grand Alliance; abbreviated as MGB), is a coalition of political parties in the Eastern state of Jharkhand in India. It is the major political alliance in Jharkhand. The alliance consists of Jharkhand Mukti Morcha, Indian National Congress, Rashtriya Janata Dal, Communist Party of India (Marxist–Leninist) Liberation. Most of the MGB constituents are members of the Indian National Congress-led Indian National Developmental Inclusive Alliance at pan-India level.

== History ==
=== 2018 ===
To fight the incumbent BJP government in the state and in national level the four major state party JMM, Congress, JVM(P), RJD joined hands to form a united opposition in the state under the leadership of JMM in state election and INC in national election called the Mahagathbandhan.

=== 2019 Lok Sabha elections ===
Jharkhand Mukti Morcha, Congress, Jharkhand Vikas Morcha (P), Rashtriya Janata Dal fought the 2019 Lok Sabha election under the banner of UPA/MGB and contested the elections for 14 Seats in Jharkhand. Congress contested on 7 seats, Jharkhand Mukti Morcha contested on 4 seats, Jharkhand Vikas Morcha (P) contested on 2 seats, Rashtriya Janata Dal contested on 1 seat. The results were announced on 23 May 2019. The Congress won from Singhbhum Seat and Jharkhand Mukti Morcha won from Rajmahal Seat. After the elections Jharkhand Vikas Morcha (P) left the alliance

=== 2019 Legislative Assembly elections ===
In Jharkhand Assembly Election, Jharkhand Mukti Morcha contested on 43 Seats, Congress contested on 31 Seats, Rashtriya Janata Dal contested on 7 Seats.

After the defeat of the incumbent BJP government, incumbent Chief Minister Raghubar Das tendered his resignation from the post to Governor Draupadi Murmu.

In the evening, during the election results, JMM leader and Former Chief Minister of Jharkhand Hemant Soren addressed the media and thanked the people of Jharkhand for the mandate. He also expressed his gratitude to his alliance partners, Congress & RJD and their president, Sonia Gandhi & Lalu Prasad Yadav respectively.

Next day on 24 December 2019, the meeting of all the 30 JMM MLAs was called, in which Hemant Soren was elected as the leader of the JMM legislature group. Hemant Soren was already the leader and Chief Ministerial candidate of the UPA during the election campaign. On the very same day, Alamgir Alam was elected as the leader of the Congress in the Assembly

After the elections, JVM(P) chief and Former Chief Minister of Jharkhand Babulal Marandi extended the support of his party to the Hemant Soren government, thus providing more strength to the government.

On 24 December 2019, Hemant Soren along with the alliance partners, met Governor Draupadi Murmu and staked claim to form the government. Thus, the Mahagathbandhan government came into existence in the Jharkhand.

=== 2024 Lok Sabha elections ===
Jharkhand Mukti Morcha, Congress, Rashtriya Janata Dal fought the 2024 Lok Sabha election and contested the elections for 14 Seats in Jharkhand. Congress contested on 7 seats, Jharkhand Mukti Morcha contested on 4 seats, Communist Party of India (Marxist–Leninist) Liberation and Rashtriya Janata Dal contested on 1 seat. The results were announced on 4 June 2024, the alliance won 5 seats.

=== 2024 Legislative Assembly elections ===
In Jharkhand Assembly Election, Jharkhand Mukti Morcha contested on 42 Seats, Congress contested on 29 Seats, Rashtriya Janata Dal contested on 7 Seats and Communist Party of India (Marxist–Leninist) Liberation on 2 seats. The alliance won landslide victory winning 56 seats.

== Electoral history ==
=== Indian General Election results (In Jharkhand) ===
Year	Seats won/ Seats contested	Change in Seats	Voteshare (%)	+/- (%)	Popular vote
2019	2 / 14	–	34.58%	▼1.72%	5,090,055
2024	5 / 14	▲3	38.97%	▲4.39 %	6,653,356

Party	2019	2024
Jharkhand Mukti Morcha	1	3
Indian National Congress	1	2
Rashtriya Janata Dal	0	0
Communist Party of India (Marxist–Leninist) Liberation	not in alliance	0
Total	2	5

=== Legislative Assembly Election ===
Year	Seats won/ Seats contested	Change in Seats	Voteshare (%)	+/- (%)	Popular vote
2019	47 / 81	▲22	35.35%	▲1.33 %	5,319,472
2024	56 / 81	▲9	44.33%	▲7.83 %	7,911,028

Party	2019	2024
Jharkhand Mukti Morcha	30	34
Indian National Congress	16	16
Rashtriya Janata Dal	1	4
Communist Party of India (Marxist–Leninist) Liberation	not in alliance	2
Total	47	56

== Current members ==
- Note: MPs in the Rajya Sabha And Lok Sabha only include those from Jharkhand seats

#	Party	Abbr.	Flag	Symbol	Leader	MLAs in Jharkhand Assembly	MPs in Lok Sabha	MPs in Rajya Sabha
1	Jharkhand Mukti Morcha	JMM			Hemant Soren	34 / 81	3 / 14	3 / 6
2	Indian National Congress	INC			Pradeep Yadav	16 / 81	2 / 14	0 / 6
3	Rashtriya Janata Dal	RJD			Satyanand Bhogta	4 / 81	0 / 14	0 / 6
4	Communist Party of India (Marxist–Leninist) Liberation	CPI(ML)L			Janardhan Prasad	2 / 81	0 / 14	0 / 6
Total						56	5	3

== Past members ==
Party	Abbr.	Base State	Year of withdrawal	Reason for withdrawal
Jharkhand Vikas Morcha (Prajatantrik)	JVM(P)	Jharkhand	2020	merged with Bharatiya Janata Party
Nationalist Congress Party	NCP	Maharashtra	2023	dispute within the party
Janata Dal (United)	JD(U)	Bihar	2024	aligned with National Democratic Alliance

== See also ==
- Mahagathbandhan (Bihar)
- Maha Vikas Aghadi (Maharashtra)
