= Louis Marandi =

Indian politician

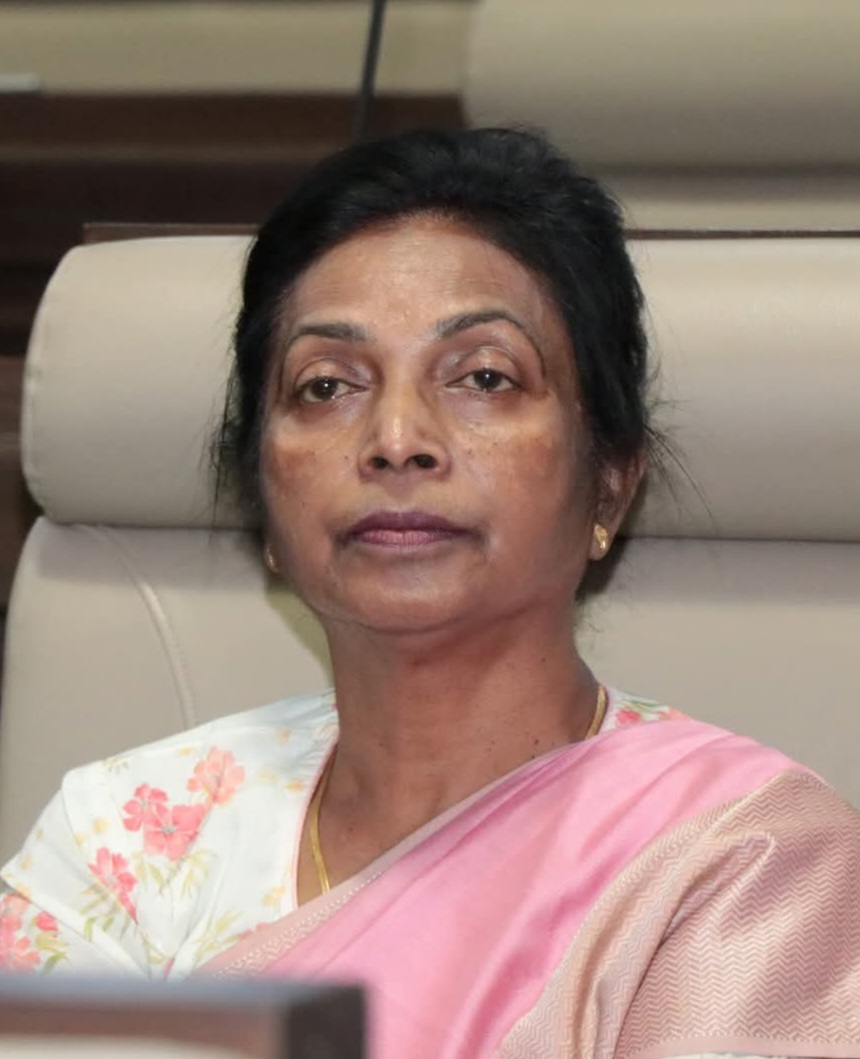

Member of the Jharkhand Legislative Assembly
- Incumbent
- Assumed office 2024
- Preceded by: Sita Soren
- Constituency: Jama
- In office December 2014 – December 2019
- Preceded by: Hemant Soren
- Succeeded by: Hemant Soren
- Constituency: Dumka

Minister for Minority Welfare, Social Welfare and Women & Child Development Government of Jharkhand
- In office 28 December 2014 – 23 December 2019

Personal details
- Born: Dumka, India
- Party: Jharkhand Mukti Morcha
- Spouse: Brentius Kisku
- Children: 2
- Education: Ranchi University
- Occupation: Politician

Louis Marandi is an Indian politician from Jharkhand. She is currently serving as member of Jharkhand Legislative Assembly from Jama as a member of Jharkhand Mukti Morcha.

She resigned from Bharatiya Janata Party on 21st Oct, 2024 to join Jharkhand Mukti Morcha. She was a cabinet minister in the Government of Jharkhand with portfolio like Welfare including Minority Welfare, Social Welfare, Women and Child Development.

She had taken various important roles for Jharkhand Bharatiya Janata Party. As President of Women wing of Jharkhand Bharatiya Janata Party earlier, she was also member of Jharkhand Women's Commission.

She has lectured at various colleges of Jharkhand in Santali subject. She was Bharatiya Janata Party candidate from Dumka assembly in 2009 assembly election of Jharkhand. She was defeated by Chief Minister of Jharkhand and Jharkhand Mukti Morcha Supremo Shibu Soren's son Hemant Soren by about 3000 votes.

One of the biggest roles she played was as National Secretary of BJP in the year 2012 in the team of Rajnath Singh. In the parliamentary election of June 2014, she played a vital role to win 12 seats from Jharkhand out of 14, though she couldn't manage her ticket from Dumka seat in that election due to internal politics of BJP.

In 2014 Jharkhand Legislative Assembly election, she defeated Chief Minister of Jharkhand and Jharkhand Mukti Morcha Supremo Shibu Soren's son Hemant Soren by 5262 votes and became one of powerful leaders of Jharkhand politics. Now she is a cabinet minister of JMM led Jharkhand government. She represents Santal Pargana in Jharkhand government.
