= Jharkhand Yuva Morcha =

Jharkhand Yuva Morcha (translation: Jharkhand Youth Front) is the youth wing of Jharkhand Mukti Morcha. It was constituted at a conference in Ranchi on 16 October 1991 along with Jharkhand Chhatra Morcha, the student wing.

In 2019, Lokesh Kumar Das was elected as president, Samim Ansari as treasurer, Shiv Narayan Mahato as secretary of the Chhatra Morcha. The student wing is active as of 2025 taking up student issues.

In October 2024, Baban Rai, president of the Singhbhum district committee expanded the panel and Mirza Hansda and Mo Mustafa were nominated as the vice presidents, Vijay Machhua as the organising secretary, Abhishek Gop as joint secretary and Sameer Das as secretary.
