= Sita Soren =

Indian politician

Member of Jharkhand Legislative Assembly
- In office 2009–2024
- Preceded by: Sunil Soren
- Succeeded by: Louis Marandi
- Constituency: Jama

Personal details
- Born: Sita Murmu; February 21, 1975 (age 51) Dumka, Jharkhand, India
- Party: Bhartiya Janata Party (2024-present)
- Other political affiliations: Jharkhand Mukti Morcha (2009-2024)
- Spouse: Durga Soren
- Children: 3
- Relatives: Shibu Soren (father-in-law); Hemant Soren (brother-in-law)
- Occupation: Politician

Sita Soren (born Sita Murmu; 21 February 1975) is an Indian politician and a leader of Bhartiya Janata Party who served as a member of Jharkhand Legislative Assembly from Jama. She is daughter-in-law of JMM chief Shibu Soren and wife of late Durga Soren. She was accused of receiving money in voting in 2012 Rajya Sabha election and was in jail for seven months. She is now out on bail.

== Political journey ==
In 2009, she was elected as an MLA from the Jama constituency in Jharkhand. After her election, she was appointed National General Secretary of Jharkhand Mukti Morcha. In 2014, she contested Jharkhand Legislative Elections from the same constituency and won. In 2019, she won the MLA election for the third time from the Jama constituency in Jharkhand. On 19 March 2024, she resigned from all the posts of her party Jharkhand Mukti Morcha and joined Bhartiya Janata Party in the presence of Vinod Tawde and Vishal Singh.
