= Hemant Soren =

Indian politician (born 1975)

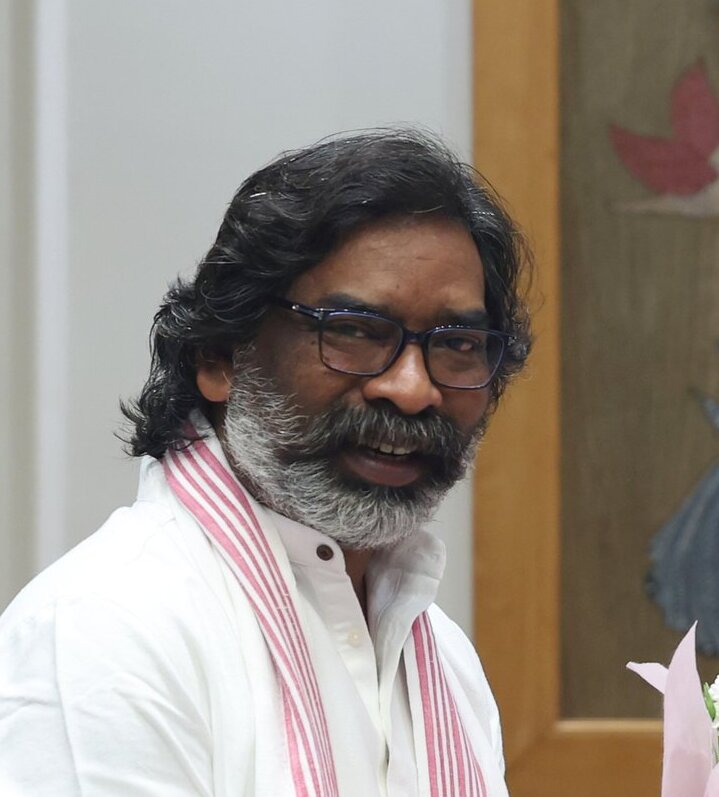
- Soren in 2024

5th Chief Minister of Jharkhand
- Incumbent
- Assumed office 4 July 2024
- Governor: C. P. Radhakrishnan; Santosh Gangwar
- Cabinet: Soren III; Soren IV
- Preceded by: Champai Soren
- In office 29 December 2019 – 2 February 2024
- Governor: Droupadi Murmu; Ramesh Bais
- Cabinet: Soren II
- Preceded by: Raghubar Das
- Succeeded by: Champai Soren
- In office 13 July 2013 – 28 December 2014
- Cabinet: Soren I
- Preceded by: Vacant (President's rule)
- Succeeded by: Raghubar Das

President of the Jharkhand Mukti Morcha
- Incumbent
- Assumed office 15 April 2025
- Preceded by: Shibu Soren

Leader of the Opposition in the Jharkhand Legislative Assembly
- In office 7 January 2015 – 28 December 2019
- Preceded by: Arjun Munda
- Succeeded by: Babulal Marandi

Deputy Chief Minister of Jharkhand
- In office 11 September 2010 – 18 January 2013
- Preceded by: Vacant (President's rule)
- Succeeded by: Vacant (President's rule)

Member of the Jharkhand Legislative Assembly
- Incumbent
- Assumed office 23 December 2014
- Preceded by: Hemlal Murmu
- Constituency: Barhait
- In office 23 December 2019 – 6 January 2020
- Preceded by: Louis Marandi
- Succeeded by: Basant Soren
- Constituency: Dumka
- In office 23 December 2009 – 23 December 2014
- Preceded by: Stephen Marandi
- Succeeded by: Louis Marandi

Member of Parliament, Rajya Sabha
- In office 24 June 2009 – 4 January 2010
- Constituency: Jharkhand

Personal details
- Born: Hemant Soren; 10 August 1975 (age 51) Nemra, Jharkhand, India
- Citizenship: Indian
- Party: Jharkhand Mukti Morcha
- Spouse: Kalpana Soren (m. 2006)
- Relations: Durga Soren (brother); Sita Soren (sister-in-law); Basant Soren (brother)
- Children: 2
- Parents: Shibu Soren (father); Roopi Soren (mother)
- Education: Patna High School; Birla Institute of Technology Mesra (attended)
- Occupation: Politician

Hemant Soren (born 10 August 1975) is an Indian politician currently officiating as the fifth Chief Minister of Jharkhand. As the president of the Jharkhand Mukti Morcha (JMM), he has led the state government during three distinct periods: from 2013 to 2014, 2019 to early 2024, and resuming in July 2024. Following a coalition victory in the 2024 Jharkhand Legislative Assembly elections, he retained his position as the state's premier.

In the state assembly, Soren has been the elected representative for the Barhait constituency since 2014, having previously held the Dumka seat for two non-consecutive terms. Over the course of his political career, his major legislative and executive roles have included a brief tenure as a Member of the Rajya Sabha (2009–2010), Deputy Chief Minister of Jharkhand (2010–2013), and Leader of the Opposition (2014–2019).

Soren's political trajectory faced a major disruption in early 2024. On 31 January, he stepped down from the chief ministership just hours before the Enforcement Directorate took him into custody over allegations of money laundering tied to a land dispute. Both Soren and his alliance partners condemned the arrest, describing it as a politically driven action orchestrated by the central government. In June 2024, the Jharkhand High Court granted him bail, enabling his release and subsequent return to the chief ministerial office, where he succeeded Champai Soren.

== Early life and education ==
Hemant Soren was born on 10 August 1975 in Nemra, a village in Ramgarh district, Jharkhand (formerly part of Bihar). His father, Shibu Soren, was a prominent tribal leader, former Chief Minister of Jharkhand, and the founder of the Jharkhand Mukti Morcha (JMM).

Soren grew up alongside three siblings: an elder brother, the late Durga Soren; an elder sister, Anjali Soren; and a younger brother, Basant Soren, who later entered politics as the MLA for Dumka.

He completed his Intermediate education at Patna High School in Patna, Bihar. He later enrolled in a mechanical engineering program at the Birla Institute of Technology, Mesra in Ranchi, but left his studies before graduating to enter active politics.

== Political career ==
Soren began his political career as a member of the Rajya Sabha, serving from 24 June 2009 to 4 January 2010. He was elected as a Member of the Legislative Assembly (MLA) on 23 December 2009. He subsequently served as the Deputy Chief Minister of Jharkhand from 11 September 2010 until 8 January 2013.

=== First term as Chief Minister (2013–2014) ===
Following the revocation of President's rule in the state, Soren was sworn in as the Chief Minister of Jharkhand on 15 July 2013, with support from the Indian National Congress and the Rashtriya Janata Dal (RJD). His first tenure concluded in December 2014 after the JMM lost the state assembly elections to the BJP.

=== Leader of the Opposition (2014–2019) ===
As the Leader of the Opposition, Soren became a prominent critic of the BJP-led Raghubar Das ministry, particularly regarding tribal land rights and welfare policies.

In 2016, the state government proposed amendments to the Chhota Nagpur Tenancy Act and the Santhal Pargana Tenancy Act, which would have allowed Adivasi land to be used for non-agricultural and commercial purposes. This sparked the Pathalgadi movement, a period of intense protests by tribal communities. Soren strongly opposed the amendments, boycotting the 2017 Global Investors Summit and characterizing it as a scheme to appropriate land from Adivasis and local farmers. Following mounting pressure from opposition parties and widespread unrest, Governor Droupadi Murmu refused to give assent to the bills in May 2017, leading to their withdrawal.

Soren also criticized the state's implementation of the Direct Benefit Transfer (DBT) system in the Public Distribution System (PDS). In October 2017, he demanded a CBI inquiry into the starvation death of an 11-year-old girl, alleging her family was denied rations because their ration card was not linked to an Aadhaar number. He campaigned against the DBT system, arguing it marginalized vulnerable populations, and supported banning liquor sales in rural Jharkhand to protect tribal communities.

=== Return to power and legal controversies (2019–present) ===
Following the victory of the JMM-INC-RJD coalition in the 2019 Jharkhand Legislative Assembly election, Soren was sworn in for his second term as Chief Minister on 29 December 2019.

His second term faced significant legal hurdles. In 2022, the Election Commission of India reportedly recommended his disqualification as an MLA for allegedly violating electoral laws by extending a mining lease to himself.

In early 2024, Soren faced intense scrutiny from the Enforcement Directorate (ED) over allegations of money laundering connected to an alleged land scam. The central agency accused him of being part of a racket that forged land records to illegally acquire 8.5 acres of land in the state capital, Ranchi.

On 31 January 2024, following several hours of questioning, Soren was formally arrested by the ED. Anticipating the arrest, he personally submitted his resignation to Governor C. P. Radhakrishnan just moments before being taken into custody. To ensure government continuity, his cabinet colleague, Champai Soren, was immediately named the legislative party leader and was sworn in as Chief Minister on 2 February 2024.

Soren vehemently denied the charges, calling the arrest a politically motivated witch-hunt. After spending five months in judicial custody, the Jharkhand High Court granted him bail on 28 June 2024, stating there were "reasons to believe that he is not guilty of the offence". Following his release, Champai Soren resigned, clearing the path for Hemant Soren to be reinstated as Chief Minister on 4 July 2024.

In the 2024 Jharkhand Legislative Assembly election, the JMM-led alliance secured 56 seats. Soren was unanimously elected as the legislature party leader and took the oath of office for a consecutive term on 28 November 2024.

In August 2026, the Soren government faced criticism and protests by students and job aspirants over irregularities in examinations conducted by the JPSC and the JSSC. Following the protests, the state government cancelled several exams and announced investigations into the irregularities in the recruitment process.

In September 2026, a special Prevention of Money Laundering Act (PMLA) court in Ranchi framed charges against Soren in connection with a land fraud case involving 8.86 acres of land in Bargai, Ranchi. The ED gave a statement that the land was acquired through fraudulent means and constituted proceeds of crime.

== Political positions ==
Throughout his career, Soren has positioned himself as a staunch advocate for tribal rights and indigenous welfare in Jharkhand. He has consistently opposed policies he views as detrimental to marginalized communities, such as the implementation of the Direct Benefit Transfer (DBT) system in the Public Distribution System (PDS) and the expansion of liquor sales in rural areas.

As Chief Minister, Soren's governance has heavily focused on localized identity politics and indigenous representation. His administration notably passed assembly resolutions seeking the recognition of a distinct 'Sarna' religious code for tribals in the national census. Furthermore, his government championed the 1932 Khatiyan-based local domicile policy, aiming to use historical land records to define local residency and prioritize indigenous populations in state employment and welfare schemes.

== Electoral history ==
=== Jharkhand Legislative Assembly ===
Electoral history of Hemant Soren
Year	Constituency	Party	Votes	%	Opponent	Opponent Party	Opponent Votes	%	Result	Margin	Margin %
2024	Barhait	JMM	95,612	58.95	Gamliyel Hembrom	BJP	55,821	34.42	Won	39,791	24.53
2019	Barhait	JMM	73,725	53.49	Simon Malto	BJP	47,985	34.82	Won	25,740	18.67
2019	Dumka	JMM	81,007	48.86	Louis Marandi	BJP	67,819	40.91	Won	13,188	7.95
2014	Barhait	JMM	62,515	46.18	Hemlal Murmu	BJP	38,428	28.32	Won	24,087	17.86
2014	Dumka	JMM	64,864	41.50	Louis Marandi	BJP	69,760	44.65	Lost	−4,896	−3.15
2009	Dumka	JMM	35,129	30.97	Louis Marandi	BJP	32,460	28.62	Won	2,669	2.35
2005	Dumka	JMM	19,610	18.33	Stephen Marandi	IND	41,340	38.65	Lost	−21,730	−20.32

== Awards and honours ==
In January 2020, Soren was conferred with the Champions of Change Award for 2019 by former President Pranab Mukherjee. The honour recognized his public service and developmental work in the Dumka and Barhait constituencies.

== Personal life ==
Soren is married to Kalpana Soren, who is also an active politician and a Member of the Jharkhand Legislative Assembly. Together, they have two sons.

Political offices
Preceded by Vacant (President's rule)	Deputy Chief Minister of Jharkhand; 11 September 2010 – 18 January 2013; Served alongside: Sudesh Mahto	Succeeded by Vacant (President's rule)
Preceded by Vacant (President's rule)	Chief Minister of Jharkhand; 13 July 2013 – 28 December 2014	Succeeded by Raghubar Das
Preceded by Raghubar Das	Leader of the Opposition in the Jharkhand Legislative Assembly; 7 January 2015 – 28 December 2019	Succeeded by Babulal Marandi
Preceded by Raghubar Das	Chief Minister of Jharkhand; 29 December 2019 – 2 February 2024	Succeeded by Champai Soren
Preceded by Champai Soren	Chief Minister of Jharkhand; 4 July 2024 – present	Incumbent
State Legislative Assembly
Preceded by Stephen Marandi	Member of the Jharkhand Legislative Assembly from Dumka Assembly constituency 2009–2014	Succeeded by Louis Marandi
Preceded by Louis Marandi	Member of the Jharkhand Legislative Assembly from Dumka Assembly constituency 2019–2020	Succeeded by Basant Soren
Preceded by Hemlal Murmu	Member of the Jharkhand Legislative Assembly from Barhait Assembly constituency 2014–present	Succeeded by Incumbent
Party political offices
Preceded by Shibu Soren	President of the Jharkhand Mukti Morcha; 15 April 2025 – present	Incumbent
