= Raghubar Das ministry =

Government of Jharkhand, India (2014–19)

- Ministry of Jharkhand
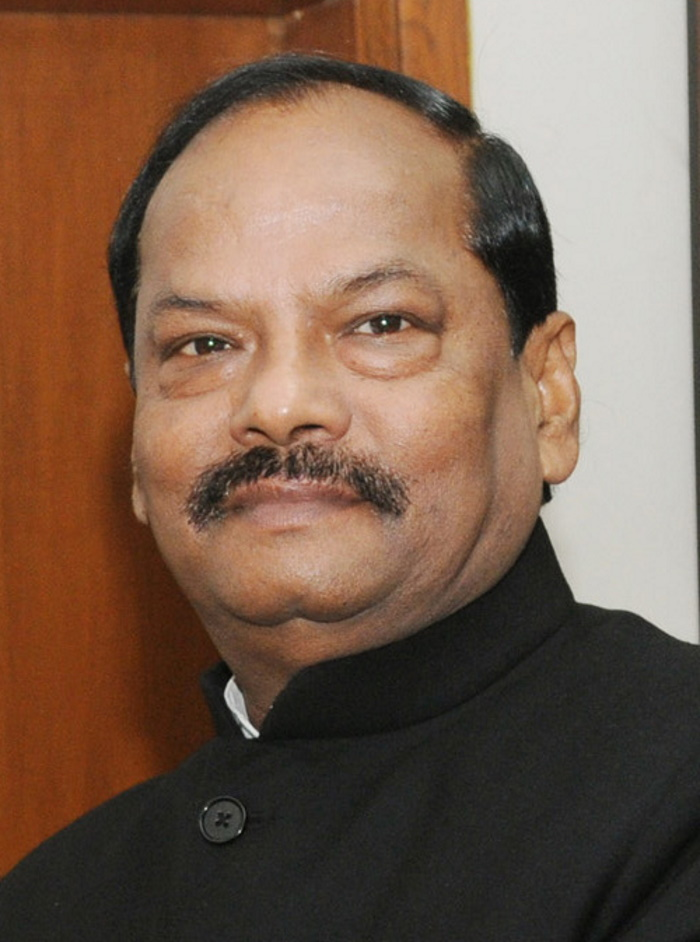
- Raghubar Das; Hon'ble Chief Minister of Jharkhand
- Date formed: 28 December 2014
- Date dissolved: 29 December 2019

People and organisations
- Head of state: Syed Ahmed; Draupadi Murmu
- Head of government: Raghubar Das
- Member parties: BJP
- Status in legislature: Majority
- Opposition party: JMM
- Opposition leader: Hemant Soren

History
- Election: 2014
- Legislature term: 5 years
- Predecessor: First Hemant Soren ministry
- Successor: Second Hemant Soren ministry

This is a list of minister from Raghubar Das cabinets starting from 28 December 2014. Raghubar Das is a politician belonging to the Bharatiya Janata Party, and was sworn in as the Chief Minister of Jharkhand on 28 December 2014.

On 28 December 2014, Nilkanth Singh Munda, Chandreshwar Prasad Singh, Dr. Louis Marandi of BJP and Chandra Prakash Choudhary of All Jharkhand Students Union were sworn in as cabinet ministers along with Raghubar Das as Chief Ministers. Das became the 10th and first non-tribal Chief Ministers of Jharkhand.

== Council of Ministers ==
Portfolio	Minister	Took office	Left office	Party
Chief Minister; Home Affairs; Finance; Planning & Development; Departments not allotted to any Minister	Raghubar Das	28 December 2014	29 December 2019	BJP
Minister of Rural Development & Panchayat Raj	Nilkanth Singh Munda	28 December 2014	29 December 2019	BJP
Minister of Urban Development & Housing	Chandreshwar Prasad Singh	28 December 2014	29 December 2019	BJP
Minister of Parliamentary Affairs	Chandreshwar Prasad Singh	28 December 2014	20 February 2015	BJP
Minister of Parliamentary Affairs	Saryu Roy	20 February 2015	13 December 2019	BJP
Minister of Women & Child Development; Minister of Social Welfare & Minority Welfare	Louis Marandi	28 December 2014	29 December 2019	BJP
Minister of Water Resources; Minister of Drinking Water & Sanitation	Chandra Prakash Choudhary	28 December 2014	4 June 2019	AJSU
Minister of Disaster Management	Chandra Prakash Choudhary	28 December 2014	20 February 2015	AJSU
Minister of Disaster Management	Chandreshwar Prasad Singh	20 February 2015	29 December 2019	BJP
Minister of Consumer Affairs, Food & Public Distribution	Saryu Roy	19 February 2015	13 December 2019	BJP
Minister of Labour, Employment & Training	Raj Paliwar	19 February 2015	29 December 2019	BJP
Minister of Health, Medical Education & Family Welfare	Ramchandra Chandravanshi	19 February 2015	29 December 2019	BJP
Minister of Education	Neera Yadav	19 February 2015	29 December 2019	BJP
Minister of Revenue & Land Reforms; Minister of Art & Culture; Minister of Sports & Youth Affairs	Amar Kumar Bauri	19 February 2015	29 December 2019	BJP
Minister of Agriculture & Sugarcane Development; Minister of Animal Husbandry & Fisheries	Randhir Kumar Singh	19 February 2015	29 December 2019	BJP

== Ministers by Party ==
Representation of cabinet ministers by party
1. Bharatiya Janata Party (93.0%)
2. All Jharkhand Students Union (7.00%)

Party	Cabinet Ministers	Total Ministers
Bharatiya Janata Party	13	13
All Jharkhand Students Union	1	1

== See also ==
- Government of Jharkhand
- Jharkhand Legislative Assembly
- Arjun Munda second ministry
- Arjun Munda third ministry
- First Hemant Soren ministry
- Second Hemant Soren ministry
