= Ramakrishna Mission Vidyapith, Deoghar =

Ramakrishna Mission Vidyapith
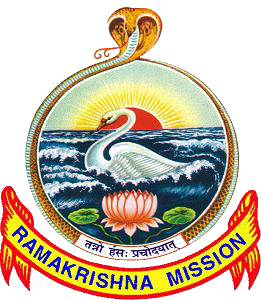

Location
- Deoghar, Jharkhand, India; 814112; 24°30′20″N 86°41′46″E

Information
- School type: Residential Boys' Senior Secondary
- Established: 1922
- Language: English
- Publication: Sangeet Sangraha, Sangeet Mala, Vivekananda Katha O Galpa, Vivekananda ki Laghu Kathayaein, Atma Vikas, Baccho ke Sri Ramakrishna in Hindi
- Affiliation: Central Board of Secondary Education (CBSE)
- Website: www.rkmvdeoghar.org

Ramakrishna Mission Vidyapith, Deoghar is a residential boys' senior secondary school in Deoghar, Jharkhand, India, established in 1922. It is the oldest institute of Ramakrishna Mission, and used to be visited by brother disciples of Swami Vivekananda. Swami Jayantananda is the present secretary, and Swami Divyasudhananda is the current principal of the school.

It is exclusively for boys and affiliated to the Central Board of Secondary Education (CBSE). Admission to its Secondary section is restricted to standard VI only. However, a few students from other schools are also admitted to class XI, in case the seats are available for them after giving entry to its own students who do well in class X Board examination. The school offers education in science stream only in its Senior Secondary Section. The boys are taken in it entirely on merit ascertained by dint of written, oral and other tests. Ramakrishna Mission Vidyapith, Deoghar was ranked 4 out of all CBSE schools in 2015 basis overall aggregates in Class XII CBSE exams in 2015. It was ranked 1st among all CBSE schools in India in 2020 based on the median aggregate score in Class X examination.

== Emblem ==
The emblem of the Ramakrishna Order was designed by Swamiji. The meaning of the emblem, in the language of Vivekananda himself: "The wavy waters in the picture are symbolic of Karma, the lotus of Bhakti, and the rising-sun of Jnana. The encircling serpent is indicative of Yoga and awakened Kunadalini Shakti, while the swan in the picture stands for Paramatman. Therefore, the ideal of the picture is that by the union of Karma, Jnana, Bhakti and Yoga, the vision of the Paramatman is obtained"

== The Holy Trio ==
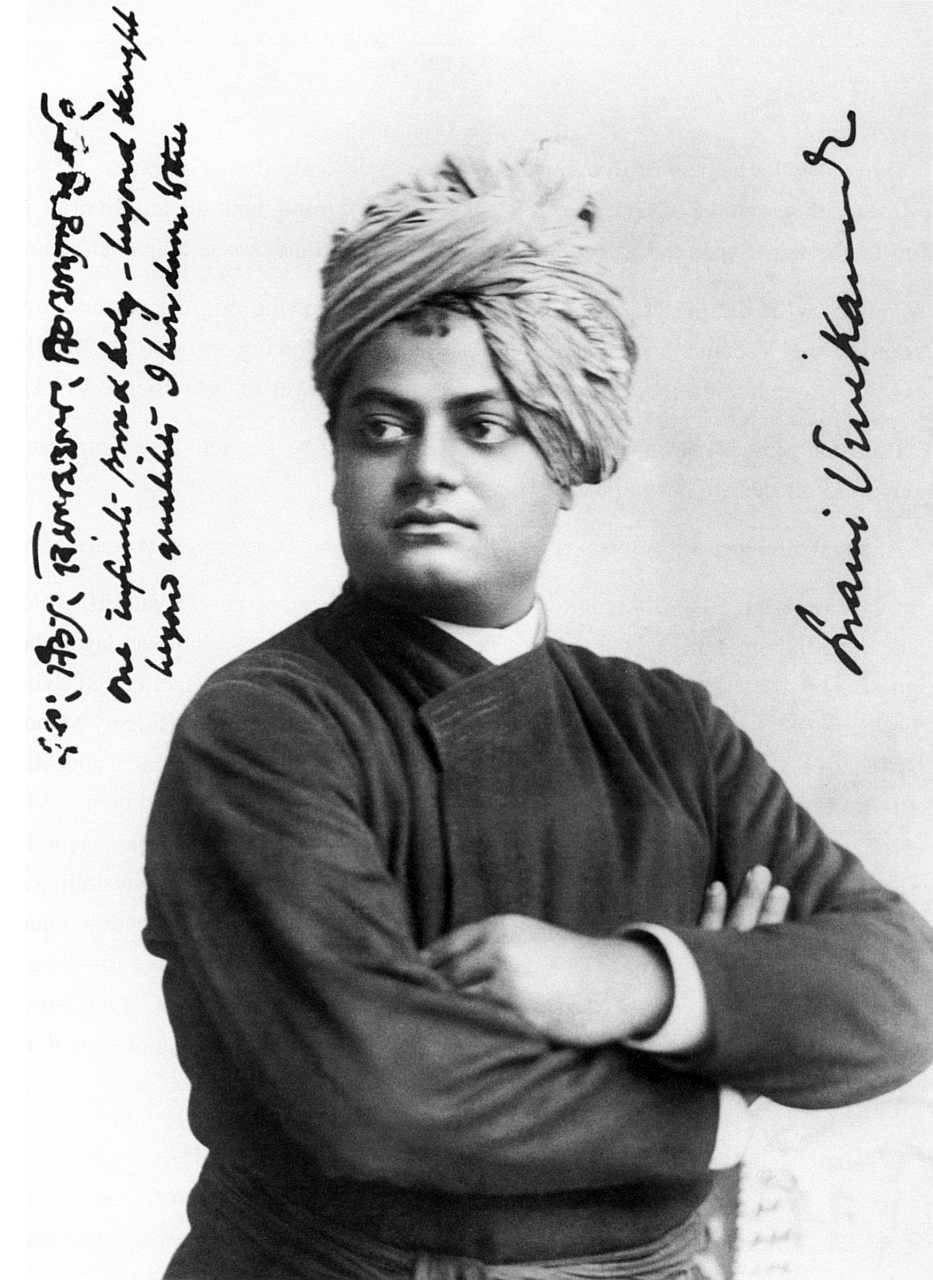
Swami Vivekananda

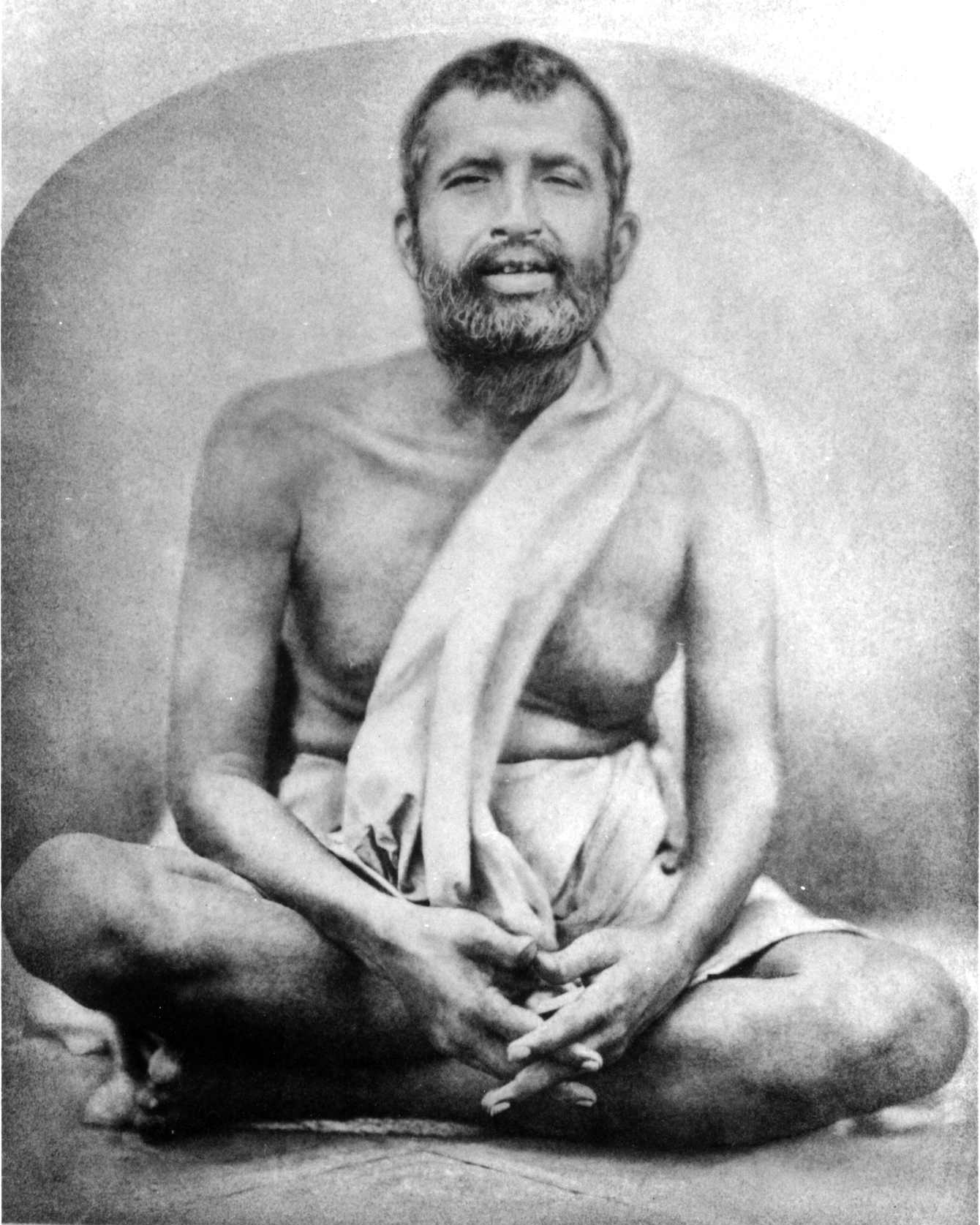
Sri Ramakrishna

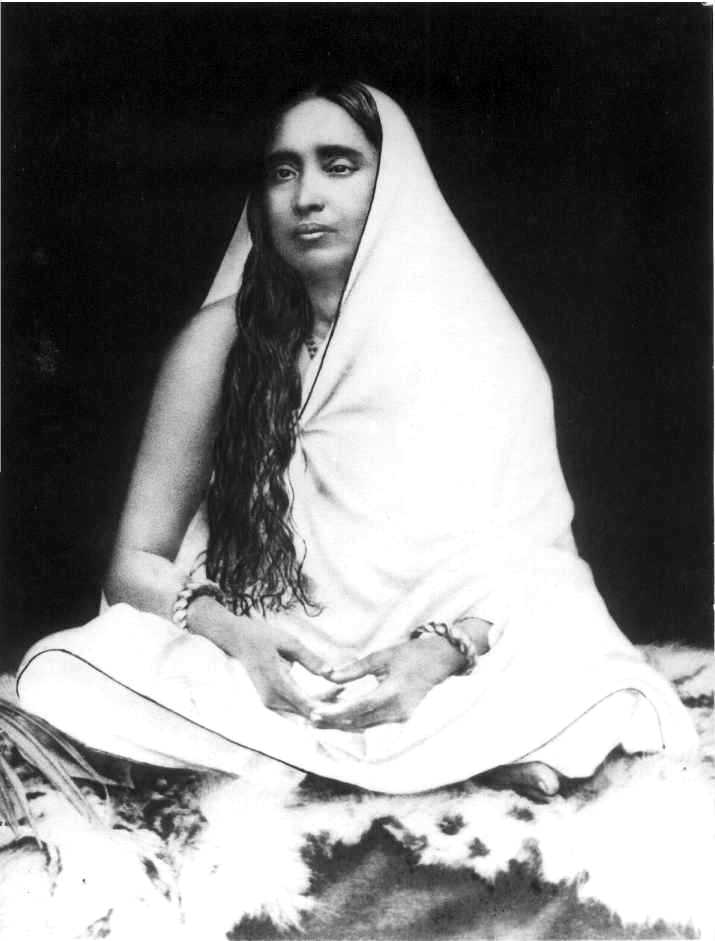
Maa Sarada

=== Sri Ramakrishna ===
Sri Ramakrishna was born Gadadhar Chatterjee in 1836 at Kamarpukur about sixty miles from Calcutta. His parents, Khudiram and Chandramani, were poor and made ends meet with great difficulty. He disliked going to school and, when asked why he did not want to go to school, his reply was The so-called education is for earning money only; I don't care for this kind of education.

He loved Nature and spent his time in fields and fruit gardens outside the village with his friends. Gadadhar lost his father at the age of seven. He became more serious from then on, but he did not change his ways and habits. For instance, he would not go to school, Instead, he was seen visiting monks who stopped at his village on their way to Puri. He would serve them and listen with attention to the arguments they had among themselves over religious issues.

Gadadhar had now attained the age when he should be invested with the sacred thread. When arrangements were nearly complete for this, Gadadhar declared that he would have his first alms as a brahmin from a certain sudra woman of the village.

When Gadadhar started worshipping the deity, he began to ask himself if he was worshipping a piece of stone or a living Goddess. If he was worshipping a living Goddess, why should she not respond to his worship? This question nagged him day and night. Then, he began to pray to Kali - "Mother, you've been gracious to many devotees in the past and have revealed yourself to them. Why would you not reveal yourself to me, also? Am I not also your son?"

He would weep bitterly and sometimes even cry out loudly while worshipping. At night, he would go into a nearby jungle and spend the whole night praying. One day he was so impatient to see Mother Kali that he decided to end his life. He seized a sword hanging on the wall and was about to strike himself with it when he saw light issuing from the deity in waves, and he was soon overwhelmed by those waves. He then fell down unconscious on the floor.

Soon word spread about this remarkable man and people of all denominations and all stations of life began to come to him. From now on he came to be known as Ramakrishna Paramahansa, and like a magnet he began to attract real seekers of God. He died in 1886, leaving behind a devoted band of young disciples headed by the scholar and orator, Swami Vivekananda.

=== Sri Sarada Devi ===
Endearingly known as ‘Holy Mother’, Sri Sarada Devi, the spiritual consort of Sri Ramakrishna, was born on 22 December 1853 in a poor Brahmin family in Jayrambati, a village adjoining Kamarpukur in West Bengal. Her father was Ramachandra Mukhopadhyay and her mother was Shyama Sundari Devin.

As a child, Sarada was devoted to God. She had no formal schooling, but learnt the Bengali alphabet. When she was about six years old, she was married to Sri Ramakrishna, according to the custom prevalent in India in those days.

Sri Ramakrishna looked upon Sarada Devi as a manifestation of the Divine Mother of the universe. Under the strain of constant physical work and self-denial and repeated attacks of malaria, her health deteriorated in the closing years of her life, and she died on 21 July 1920.

=== Swami Vivekananda ===
Swami Vivekananda, known in his pre-monastic life as Narendra Nath Datta, was born in an affluent family in Kolkata on 12 January 1863. His father, Vishwanath Datta, was an attorney, his mother was Bhuvaneshwari Devi. Narendra excelled in music, gymnastics and studies. By the time he graduated from Calcutta University, he had acquired a particular knowledge of Western philosophy and history. Born with a yogic temperament, he practised meditation even from his boyhood, and was associated with Brahmo Movement for some time.

== The Universal Temple ==
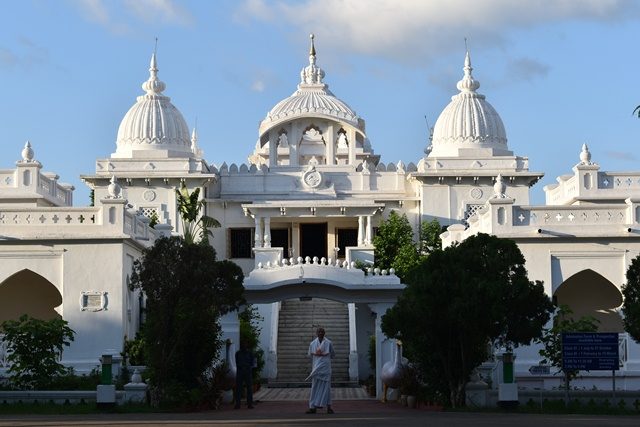
The Universal Temple

The Universal Temple of Sri Ramakrishna held in the bosom of the Vidyapith campus is a place of attraction to the religious minded. There, morning prayer and evening services (Aratrikam) are conducted by the resident boys as part of their daily routine. Religious festivals, observances and worships are carried out in it.

== Administration ==
The institute is run by monks (sanyasins) & Brahmacharins of the Ramakrishna Order. The staff includes teachers from all over India as well as from alien countries. The Non-Teaching staffs includes workers from neighboring town and villages.

Central Administration
Designation	Person
Secretary	Swami Jayantananda
Principal	Swami Divyasudhananda

Secondary Administration
Designation	Person
Hostel Coordinator	Br. Amiteshchaitanya
Coordinator	Swami Mrideshananda

Senior Secondary Administration
Designation	Person
Chief Warden	Br. Anadichaitanya
Coordinator	Br. Prabhuchaitanya

== Campus ==
The school has a very large campus and is divided into two parts : The Main Campus and the Senior Secondary Campus. The school campus contains many attractive buildings. Being a residential school, there are dormitories all around the campus to facilitate the boarding of students. The Vidyapith Teachers and Staffs are also provided the Staff quarters. There are many Guest rooms and dormitories for Guests and devotees who generally pay a visit to this holy place.

=== Secondary School Building ===
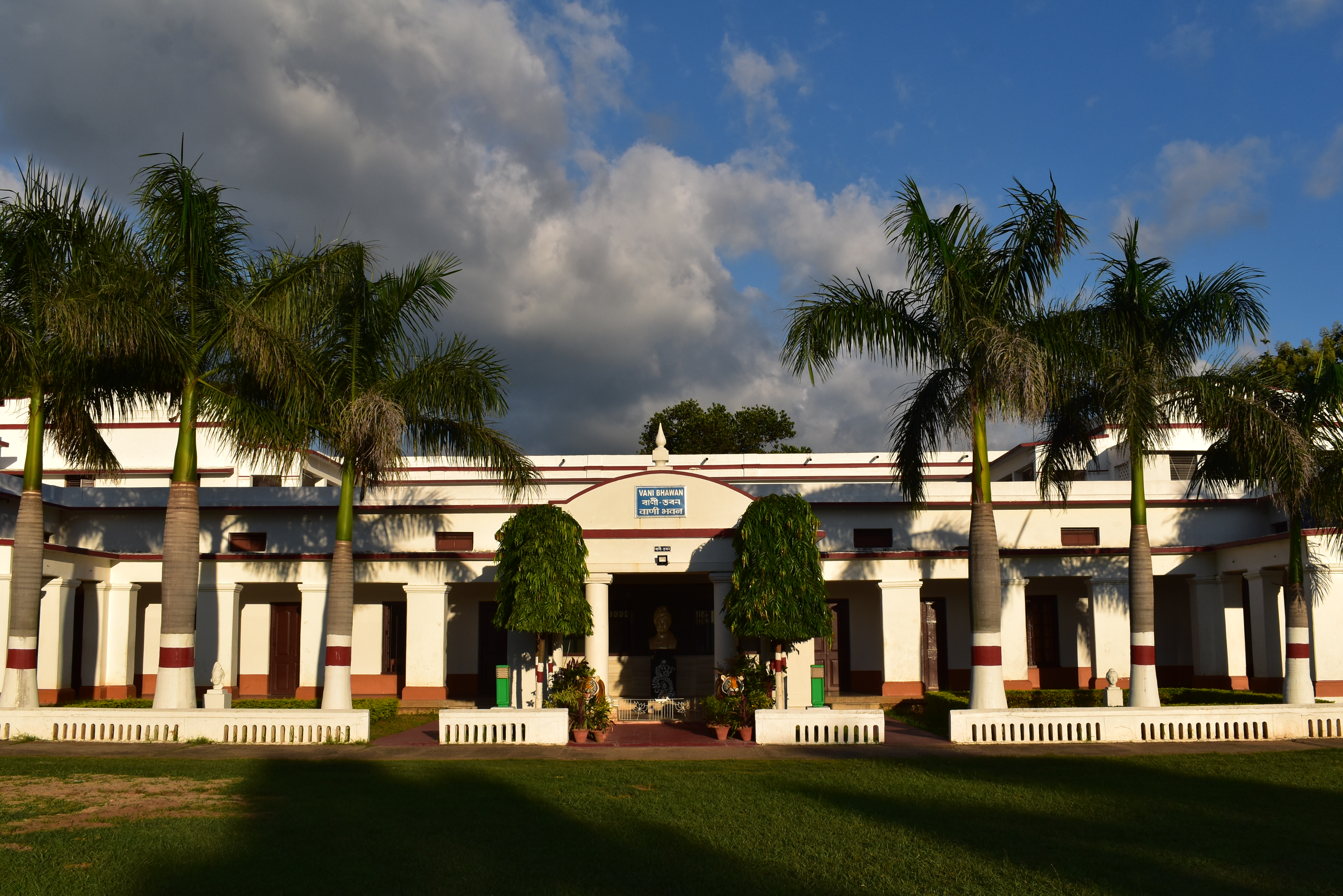
The Secondary School Building

The entrance to the school building leads to the feet of Maa Saraswati. The School has 10 Smart Classes for students to make them better learners. The Students are taught by Highly Trained and professional teachers to make them the best in studies. The school has Physics, Chemistry, Mathematics, Biology, Music, Arts, Computer Laboratory to encourage the students to showcase their creativity. The School has 2 Big size Hall rooms to enable private study at non schooling hours and enable Smooth conduction of Examination. The School Building has well maintained and sanitized Toilets.

==== Atal Tinkering Lab ====
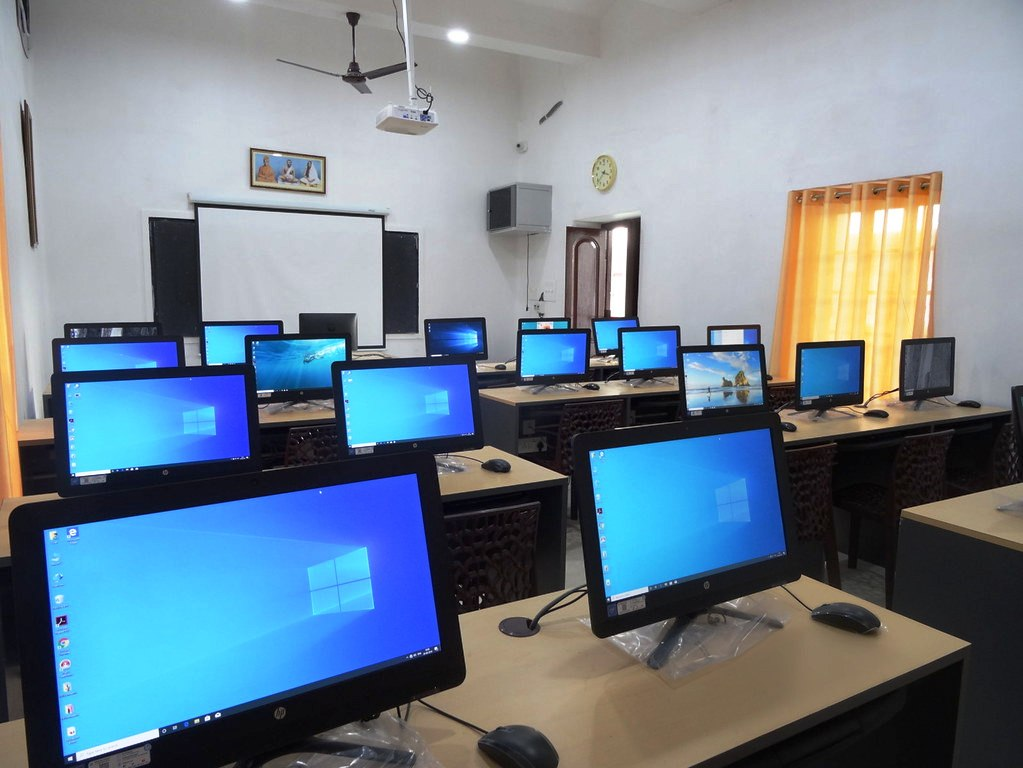
Digital Lab for Online Tests & Learning

ATL is an initiative of Central government of India to create an environment of scientific temperament, innovation, creativity amongst students. ATL lab offer activity-based learning to students to inculcate skills such as design mindset, computational thinking, adaptive learning, physical computing etc.

==== Digital Resource Room & Digital Library ====
The Digital Library is a new Initiative of the school authority to enable the students to get familiar to world-class Books & Novels. It has all kind of Materials related to Academics. It has books of Famous Writers and Publication that helps students to collect resources for their preparation of various competitive exams like Science Olympiad, NTSE, JEE Mains, JEE Advanced, NEET, NDA, NA, WBJEE, BITSAT.

The digital resource room is a facility in the school building that consists of 25 self-sufficient computers with internet access. It allows students to access online tutorial classes and online tests. It also helps students gather electronic resources.

=== Senior Secondary School ===
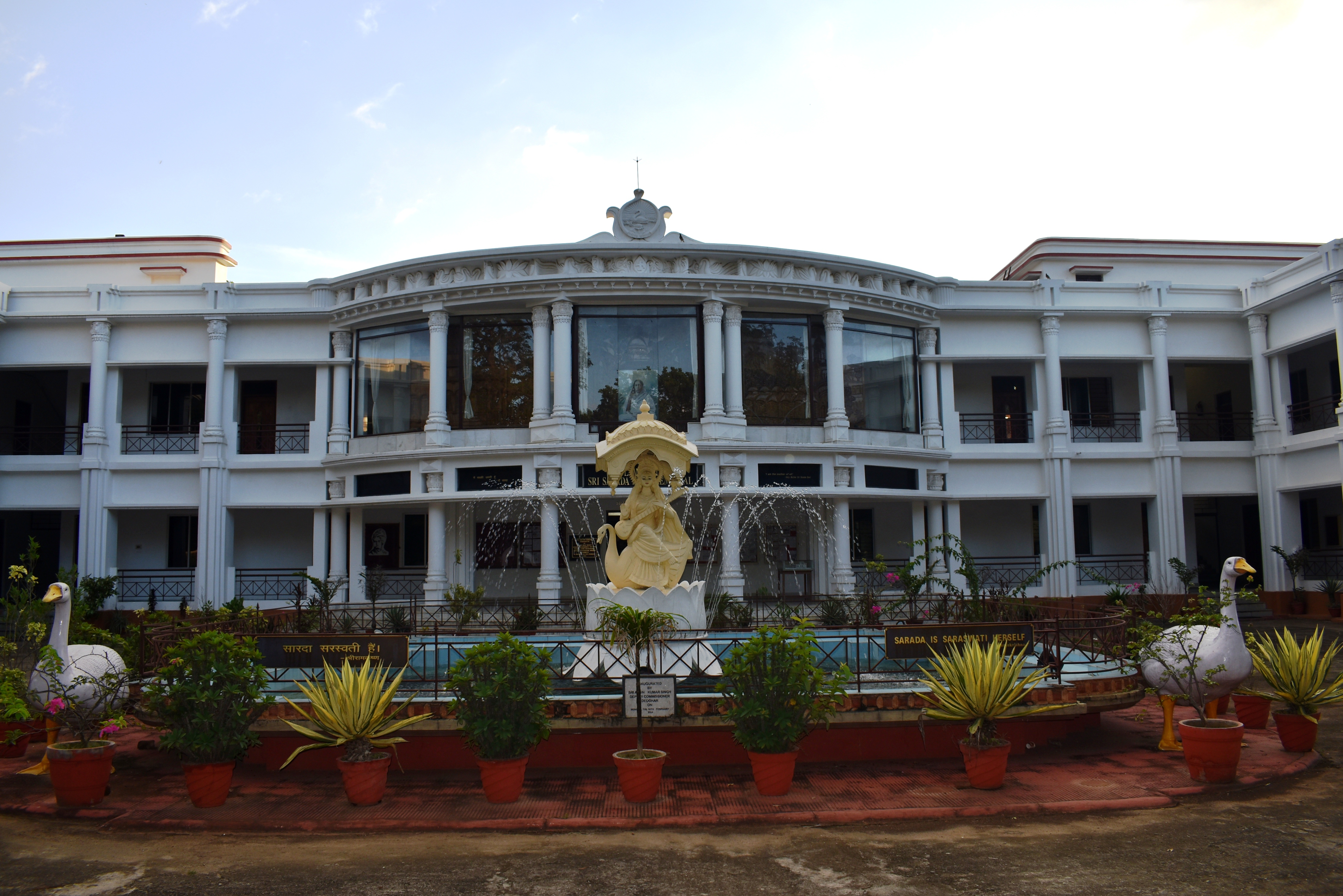
The Senior Secondary School Campus.

The Foundation Stone of the Building was inaugurated by The Chief Minister Of Jharkhand. The Senior Secondary School building has 4 Classrooms with One Smart Class. There is a Library in the Building that provides access to various old and valuable books. The Building has a full Air Conditioned Hall for School Assembly And Various programs. The Senior Secondary School has separate Labs for various Experiments. These include Physics, Chemistry, Biology, Computer Science.

=== Dormitories ===
There are 13 dhams (dormitory) in the Secondary Section, namely, Yogananda Dham, Ramakrishnananda Dham, Adbhutananda Dham, Brahmananda Dham, Shivananda Dham, Turiyananda Dham, Vivekananda Dham, Akhandananda Dham, Premananda Dham, Vijnanananda Dham, Matri Dham, Saradananda Dham, Subodhananda Dham.

=== Vivekananda Taran-tal ===
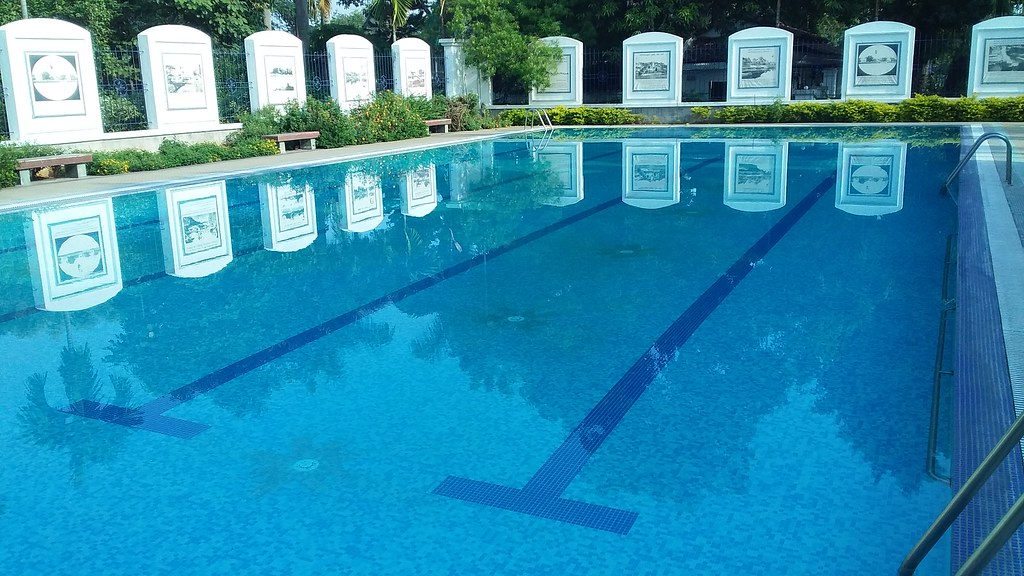
'Vivekananda T'aran Tal

The school has a standard size swimming pool named Vivekananda Taran Tal, inaugurated on 22 January 2009. The swimming pool is a comparatively recent addition to Vidyapith. Boys of the school use it regularly to learn swimming from qualified instructors. Its water is maintained clean, free from germs and contamination, by proper technology. There is annual Swimming Competition in Vidyapith. Swimming is taught to students on a weekly basis, and it helps the students in many ways.

=== Vivekananda Auditorium ===
The school has a theater sized auditorium, with an audience capacity of around 600. Every year functions such as Inter-School competitions, debates, seminars, and prize distribution are performed there. Other schools in the city come to the school to hold their functions. The Auditorium also hosts celebrations like Teacher's day, Bengali New Year (Pôhela Boishakh), Republic Day, Independence Day, Reunion etc.

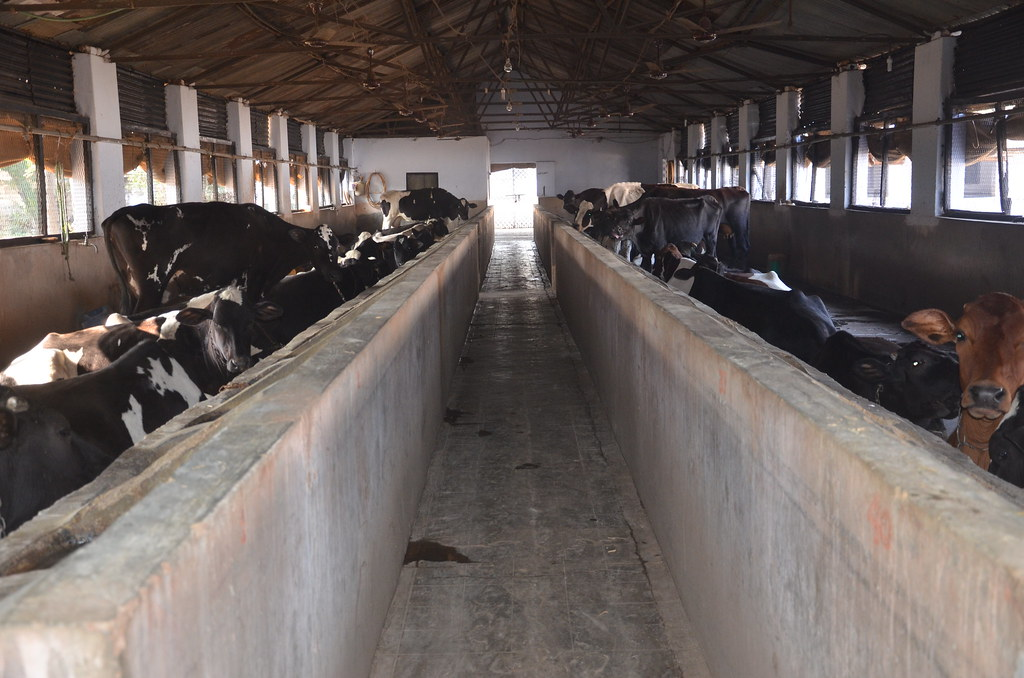
Dairy

=== Dairy ===
The Vidyapith Dairy has a total of 121 cows with an average yield of 375-390 ltrs. per day (2017–18). Almost the whole of the milk produced is consumed by the inmate students and residential staff. The dairy has mechanised milking facility and the cow-dung produce obtained is used to run bio-gas plants, used in kitchen-cooking in Vidyapith.

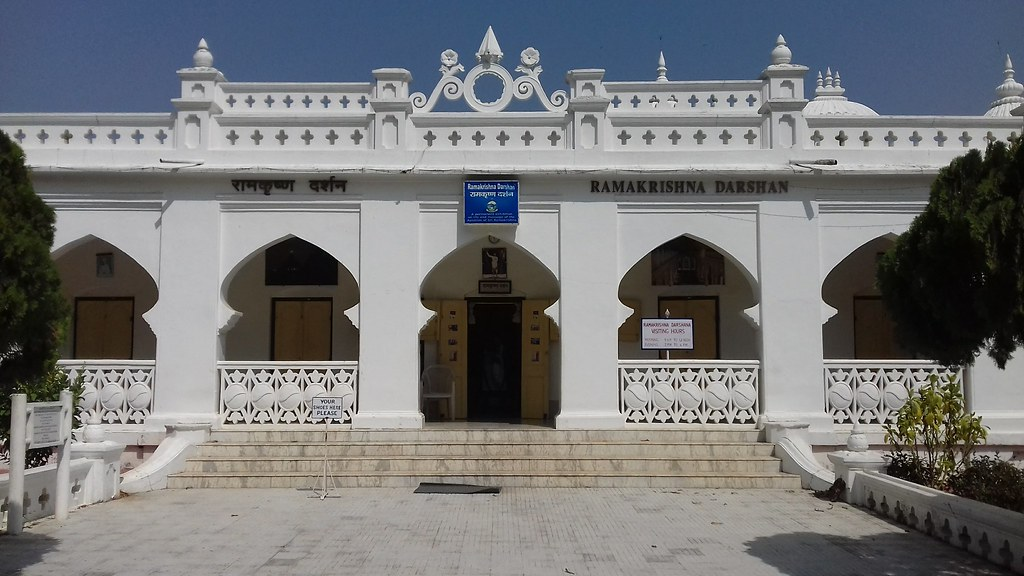
Ramakrishna Movement

=== Ramakrishna Darshan and Literature Corner ===
A permanent exhibition consisting of rare photographs, fibre glass relief images and descriptions related to them, Ramakrishna Darshan is a story of the Ramakrishna Movement graphically said. It chronologically demonstrates the history of the Movement, showing the roles played by Sri Ramakrishna, Sri Sarada Devi, Swami Vivekananda and his other brother disciples. It lays emphasis on two visits of Swami Vivekananda to the West, his interactions with many important people abroad and views of well known Indian thinkers influenced by him. There is a permanent exhibition Ramakrishna Darshan on the lives and contributions of Sri Ramakrishna and his disciples, emphasizing the service for mankind by Swami Vivekananda. This educates its visitors through photographs, glass fiber models and a history of the Ramakrishna Movement. Vidyapith has a Religious Literature Corner where publications on Sri Ramakrishna, Sri Sarada Devi, Swami Vivekananda, the Vedanta and the Indian culture are kept for sale.

=== Museum ===
Built with the co-operation of National Museum, this museum of modest size comprehensibly represents the rich heritage of India. India's achievements in religion and other spheres through the ages have been depicted in it. An important place has been given to the tribal cultures and lifestyles of India's indigenous people, employing relevant models, materials and images. Besides, the museum presents a collection of objects, photographs and accounts of personalities connected with the development of this institution over the decades. There is also a section devoted to the life and contribution of Sri Sarada Devi.

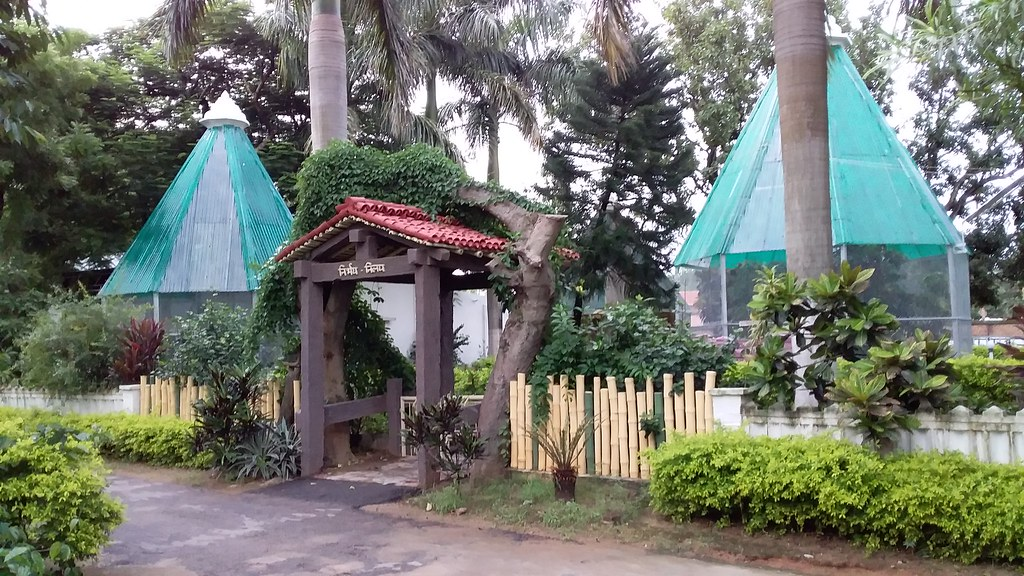
Aviary

=== Aviary ===
The aviary contains some birds of uncommon varieties and coloured plumages, such as the Love Bird, Silver Pheasant, Speaking Moyna, Wild Peacock, and Kakatuah. They are being provided with natural habitats in big cages. A few white hares are also kept in separate enclosures. It also has a garden with birds, flowers, trees and cactus plants.

== Vivekananda Balakendra ==
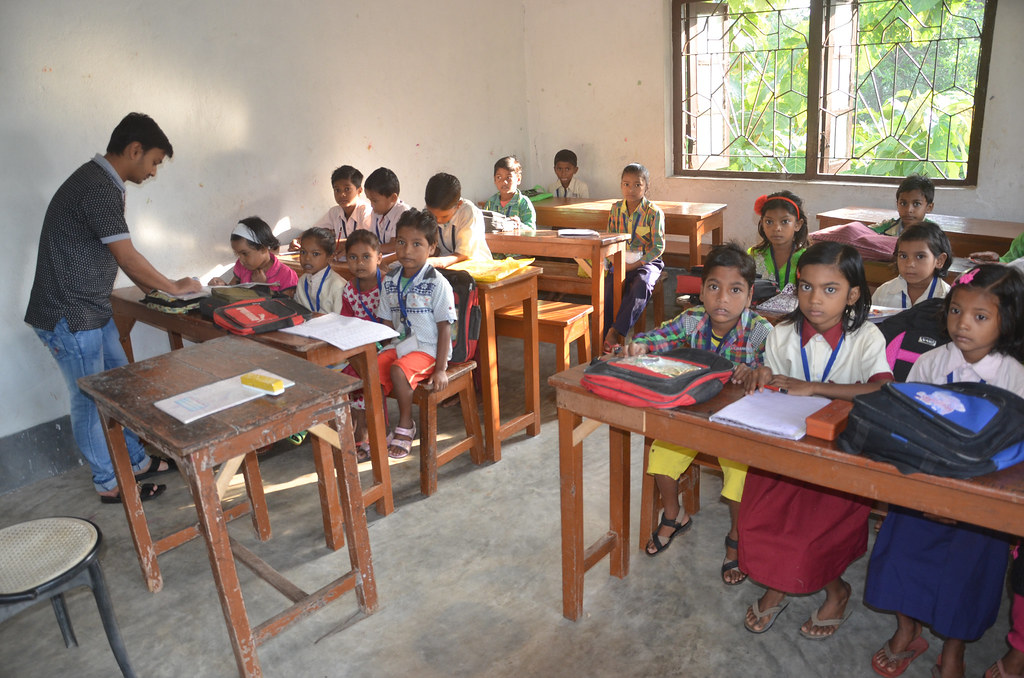
Vivekananda Balakendra

Swami Vivekananda wanted a new India to emerge “out of peasant's cottage” and “from beside the oven of the fritter-seller”. The Vivekananda Balakendra caters to the needs of the underprivileged children, mostly from ST, SC and OBC communities around Vidyapith. It provides study-coaching to both boys and girls, the strength as in March 2018 being: Total 300 (Boys: 218 and Girls: 82), the following being the break-up SC: 101, ST: 22, OBC: 126, General: 51.

The children of Vivekananda Balakendra were fed with milk, biscuits and boiled eggs daily, in order to provide supplementary nutrition to the regular food in their homes. A total of 183 kg (403 lb) of milk powder was distributed among 18,076 students during 2017–18. They utilized the Balakendra playgrounds and the elaborate arrangements for games and sports.

In the year 2017–18, 17 students benefiting from the study-coaching at Balakendra appeared at the Secondary Board exam (from other schools) under Jharkhand Academic Council. 13 of these students secured 1st Division, while 4 students secured 2nd Division.

Vocational training was provided in Electric Motor, Transformer Rewinding, and House Wiring & Electrical Appliances Repairing to a total of 8 trainees. The Vocational section is an accredited unit of National Institute for Open Schooling (NIOS).

== Charitable Dispensary ==
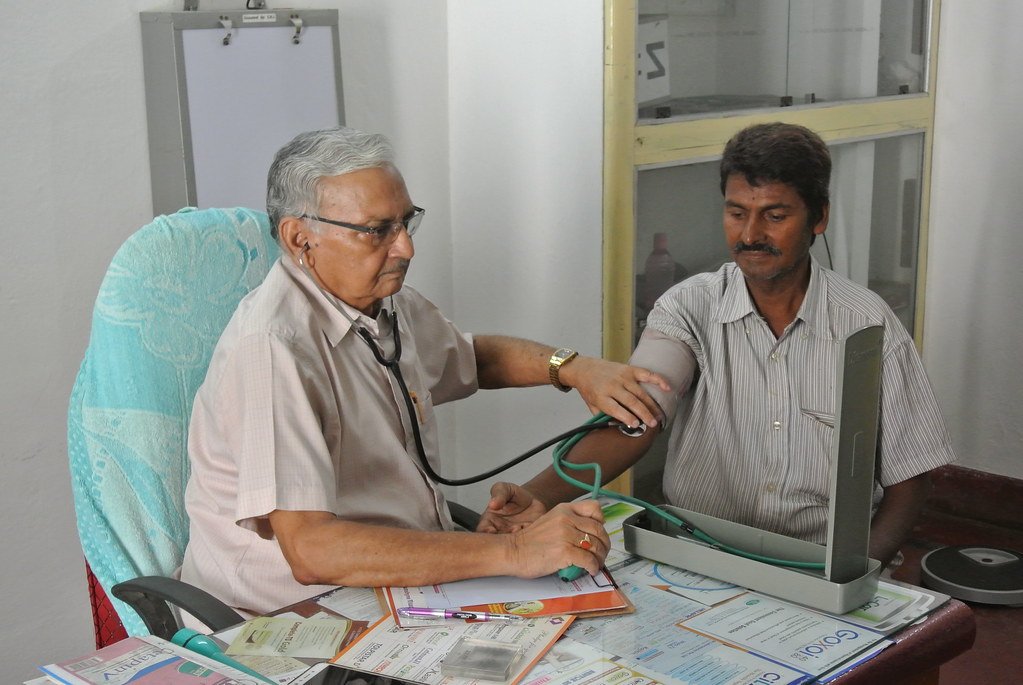
Charitable Dispensary

Sarada Charitable Dispensary of Vidyapith serves the local poor primarily. A number of qualified doctors are attached to it. It contains pathology, ECG and X-ray units in its diagnostic section. Many patients were treated in the dispensary's well-equipped dental clinic. Numerous pathological tests were done in its laboratory on Full Auto Analyzer machine. Patients were also being treated in the Physiotherapy, General Medicine and Orthopedic units. Besides this, the services of ECG and USG instruments are also being offered to patients.

== Publications ==
Vidyapith has a number of religious publications. Titles it has brought out so far are as below:

1. Sangeet Sangraha – A collection of songs (in Bengali);
2. Sangeet Mala – A collection of songs (in Hindi);
3. Sadhan Sangeet – A book of songs with Notation (in Bengali);
4. Bachcho Ke Sri Ramakrishna (in Hindi) – A short pictorial life;
5. Vivekanander Katha O Galpa – A supplementary reader in Bengali (classes VI & VII);
6. Vivekananda Ki Laghu Kathaein – A supplementary reader in Hindi (classes VI & VII);
7. Atma Vikas –A book in Hindi to mould the character of children;
8. Audio album (CD):
  - Shivatandavam
  - Shivakalpataru
  - Namo Bhagavate Rudraya
  - Sri Rama Tuhi-Sri Krishna Tuhi
  - Juraite Chai Kothay Jurai (Bengali)
  - Gita-Sara.
9. Three DVDs:
  - ‘BE and MAKE’ – a video Documentary on Vidyapith
  - A pilgrimage to the 2nd and 3rd Kedar (A holy footage).
  - 'A glorious passage to wisdom(https://youtu.be/XMG0ar_ANZE)- a video Documentary by vidyapith on its centenary year celebration.

== Location ==
Ramakrishna Mission Vidyapith is located in the heart of Deoghar, Jharkhand, being the holy abode of Shiva, it is one of the most significant places of pilgrimage in the country. It is an ancient city, which harbours in its bosom a body part of Sati the Divine Mother.

The school is 30 minutes drive from the Jasidih railway junction.
