= Narayan Das =

Narayan Das may refer to:

- Narayan Das (footballer) (born 1993), Indian footballer
- Narayan Das (Bihar politician), Indian politician
- Narayan Das (Jharkhand politician), Indian politician
