= Jasidih =

- Satellite Town
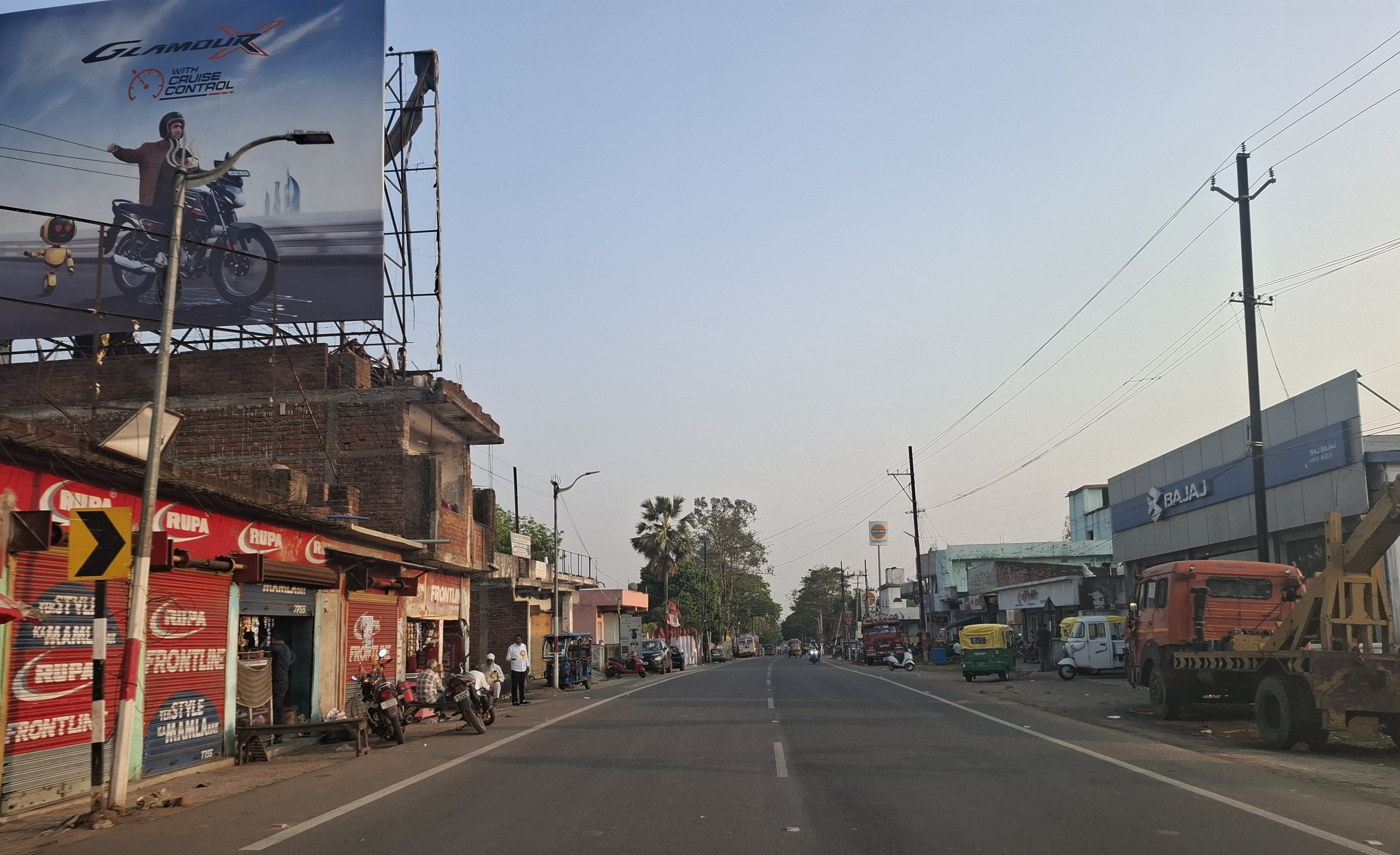
- Jasidih town
- Nickname: Satellite Town of Deoghar
- Location in Jharkhand, India Jasidih (India)
- Coordinates: 24.5220°N 86.6477°E
- Country: India
- State: Jharkhand
- District: Deoghar
- Elevation: 260 m (850 ft)

Population (2001)
  - Total: 14,129

Languages
  - Official: Hindi, Santali
- Time zone: UTC+5:30 (IST)
- Postal code: 814142
- Vehicle registration: JH-15
- Lok Sabha constituency: Godda
- Vidhan Sabha constituency: Deoghar

Jasidih is a satellite town of Deoghar under the Deoghar subdivision of Deoghar district in the Indian state of Jharkhand. This town's railway station connects Deoghar to other cities.

== Geography ==
Cities, towns and locations in the Deoghar, Dumka and Jamtara districts in Santhal Pargana Division
M: Municipality, CT: census town, R: Rural/ Urban centre, D: Dam,
Owing to space constraints in the small map, the actual locations in a larger map may vary slightly

=== Location ===
Jasidih is a Hill Station located at 20°N 89°E. It has an average elevation of 260 metres (853 feet).

=== Overview ===
The map shows a large area, which is a plateau with low hills, except in the eastern portion where the Rajmahal hills intrude into this area and the Ramgarh hills are there. The south-western portion is just a rolling upland. The entire area is overwhelmingly rural with only small pockets of urbanisation.

Note: The full screen map is interesting. All places marked on the map are linked in the full screen map and one can easily move on to another page of his/her choice. Enlarge the full screen map to see what else is there – one gets railway connections, many more road connections and so on.

== Demographics ==
As of 15 September 2017 India census, Jasidih had a population of 14,129. Males constitute 60% of the population and females 40%. Jasidih has an average literacy rate of 71.5%, lower than the national average of 74.5%.In Jasidih, 20% of the population is below 20 years of age.

== Transportation ==
=== Railway ===
Jasidih is located on the Howrah-Delhi main line. Jasidih was ranked as one of the cleanest railway station in India. It is well connected with foot over bridges and RailWire Wifi. There are frequent local trains from Jasidih to Deoghar. There also exists auto rickshaw and car service from Jasidih station.

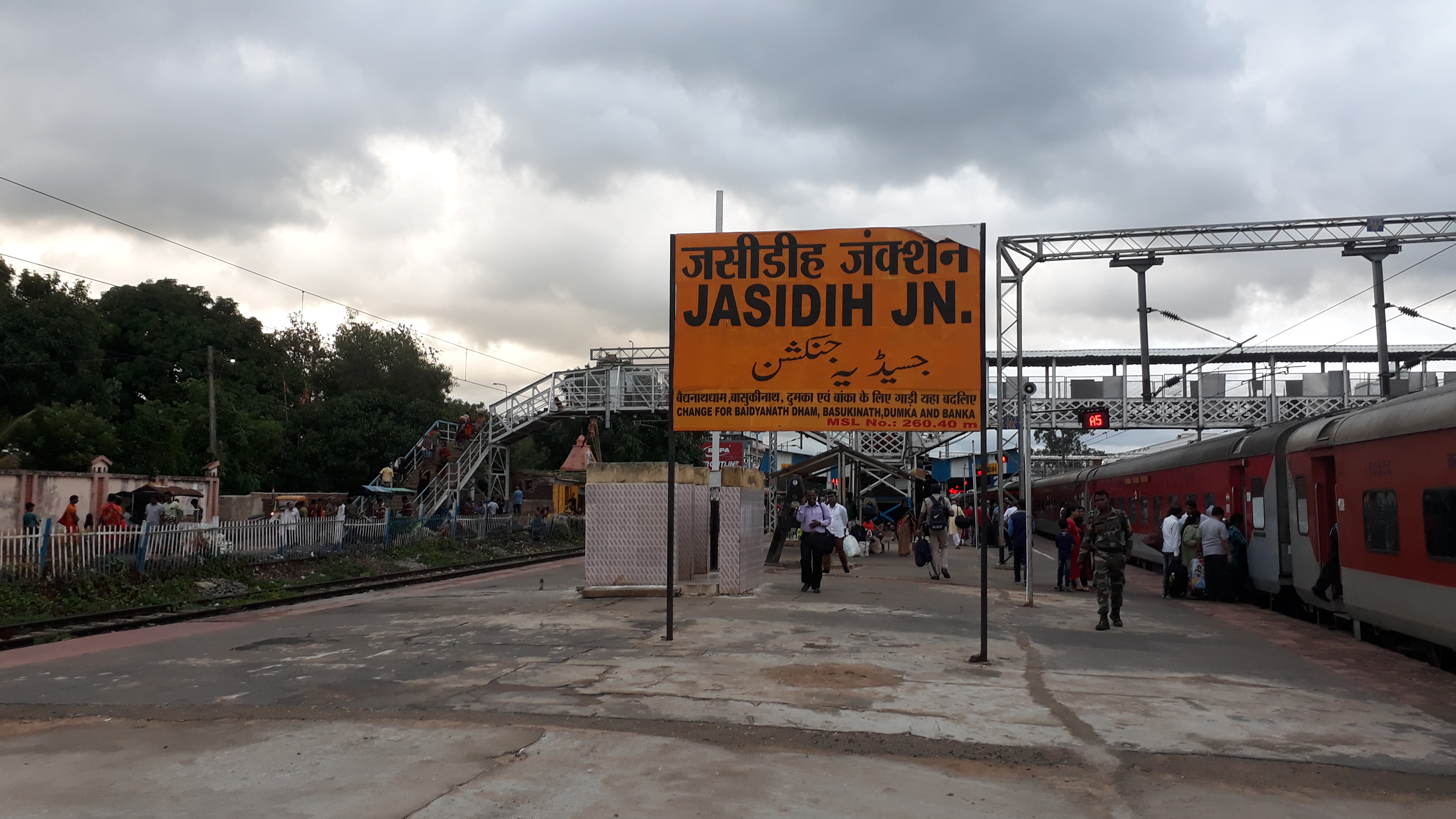
Jasidih Junction railway station

=== Road ===
Jasidih is also well connected by road to neighbouring including, Dumka, Giridih, Godda Dhanbad, Jamui, Banka, and Bhagalpur.

== Places of interest ==
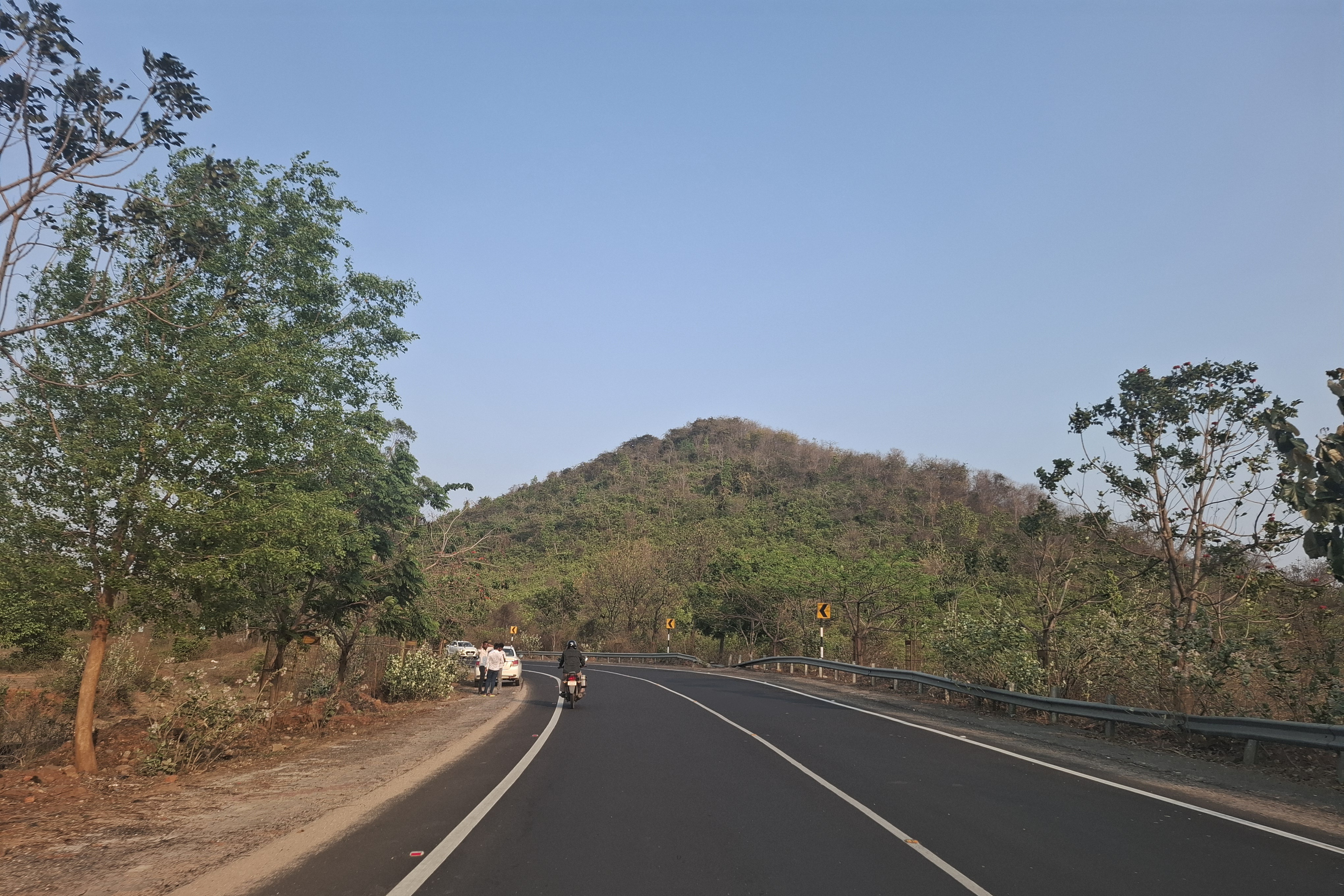
Dighariya hill near Josidih

=== Visitors' attractions ===
- Gayatri Mandir
- Rohini Park
- Haldigram
- Digariya hil
- Pagla Baba Mandir (Balanand Ashram)

=== Market ===
Jasidih has a good market area. This market serves as the destination for food and other goods for many tourist who visit Deoghar.

=== Institutions ===
Birla Institute Of Technology, Deoghar is one of the extension centers of BIT Mesra, Ranchi and is located in Jasidih.
