= Brahmajna Ma =

Sri Brahmajna Ma

Personal life
- Born: 21 February 1880 Bitara, Comilla, Bengal, British Raj
- Died: 5 November 1934 (aged 54) Deoghar, Jharkhand

Religious life
- Religion: Hinduism
- Philosophy: Advaita Vedanta

Sri Brahmajna Ma (21 February 1880 – 5 November 1934) was an Indian advaitin saint from East Bengal. Like Ramana Maharshi, she had no guru, but attained enlightenment through her own efforts at self-inquiry.

== Life ==
Brahmajna Ma was named Kadambini Devi by her father Abhaya Charan Chakravarti. She was born in the small village of Bitara, in the Tipperah district of East Bengal (now the Comilla district of Bangladesh), and married at the age of eight, according to the prevalent custom, to a young Brahmin of the nearby village Putia. Her husband died before she was ten years old. She attained final realisation in 1912, after which she travelled to various places in India. She died in Deoghar, Bihar (now Jharkhand) in 1934.

== Autobiography ==
Brahmajna Ma did not want any biography written about her. She herself dictated the following as the complete biography of her life:

She was naturally given to discrimination and was engaged in the search for Spiritual Truth. From her childhood, she used to think—(1) where does a human being go and in what state he remains after death, and whence does he come? (2) In nothing can peace be found in this world; what, then, is real peace? In such thoughts she would then become immersed. And lastly, such thoughts as (3) who am I, what is this body, mind or Atma—used to engage her. These are the three stages of her Sadhana. Without the help of books or gurus, by dint of pure discrimination and search for Truth, she tore asunder the meshes of maya, overcame all doubts and attained Self-Realization.

== Teachings ==
Some selected teachings:

- Brahma is the only Reality—all else is unreal. Men are eager in their search for happiness in unreal worldly objects and do not want to know the truth of the Self, though in that alone lies real happiness and bliss, for man's mind is infatuated with desires.
- By the term dharma I understand the effort to cross the sea of this world of creation. That one has come into this world is a wrong notion; to give it up and return to the origin is dharma.
- Enjoying sexual pleasures is like taking a sweetened ball of poison. Nothing covers the Self as much as this. The more this desire fades away, the thinner will be the cover.
- Men consider sexual instinct as bad in its gross manifestation. Decrying it in this way is not going deep enough, for they still enjoy the inclination inwardly. As long as this state of mind continues sexual impulse will not be checked. To understand that there is no real pleasure in it is the correct understanding.
- The thought of death brings about renunciation. For an aspirant the thought of death is a means of advancement.
- The more one gives up the more one gets. When all is given up, ALL is achieved.
