= All India Institute of Medical Sciences, Deoghar =

Public medical college and hospital in Jharkhand, India

- अखिल भारतीय आयुर्विज्ञान संस्थान, देवघर
- Official seal of AIIMS Deoghar
- Other name: AIIMSDHR
- Motto: Ārogyam Paramam Sukham (ISO)
- Motto in English: Health is the biggest blessing that can be bestowed upon a person
- Type: Public Medical School
- Established: September 17, 2019; 7 years ago
- Accreditation: Institute of National Importance
- Affiliations: Ministry of Health and Family Welfare (India)
- President: Dr. M. V. Padma Srivastava
- Director: Dr. Nitin M. Gangane
- Faculty: 120
- Administrative staff: 156
- Students: ~ 608 Total Seats: MBBS - 125; B.Sc. (N) - 62; MD+MS - 8
- Undergraduates: 600
- Postgraduates: 8
- Location: Deoghar, Jharkhand, India; 24.435828°N 86.613311°E
- Campus: Suburban 236.92 acres (95.88 ha)
- Website: aiimsdeoghar.edu.in

Campus view of AIIMS, Deoghar

All India Institute of Medical Sciences, Deoghar (AIIMS Deoghar) is a medical university and hospital located in Deoghar, Jharkhand, India. It is also one of the All India Institutes of Medical Sciences (AIIMS) that started operation in 2019. The Institute operates autonomously under the Ministry of Health and Family Welfare of Government of India under the Pradhan Mantri Swasthya Suraksha Yojna (PMSSY) and also among the Institutes of National Importance in India.

== History ==
AIIMS Deoghar was set up as part of the Pradhan Mantri Swasthya Suraksha Yojana (PMSSY) initiative, announced by the Government of India in 2003 and officially launched in March 2006, for the purpose of "correcting regional imbalances in the availability of affordable/reliable tertiary healthcare services", through setting up AIIMS Delhi-like institutions and upgrading government medical colleges.

A proposal for setting an AIIMS in Jharkhand was first made by the local government in June 2016. In August, in response to a request by the union government to come up with several alternatives for the location, the local government announced that the preferred location is in Deoghar, although Ranchi was also considered. On 1 February 2017, in the budget presentation for 2017–2018, Minister of Finance Arun Jaitley officially announced the intent to establish an AIIMS in Jharkhand, as well as one in Gujarat. These were later denoted "Phase-VI" of PMSSY. A detailed project report was prepared in July and the site in Deoghar was finalised in December. In April 2018 the local government handed over the 236.92 acres (95.88 ha) of land required for establishing the AIIMS, and finally, in May 2018, the union cabinet approved the AIIMS, with a provision of ₹1,103 crore (US$110 million). The foundation stone was laid by Prime Minister Narendra Modi later that month. The ₹9.02 billion (US$94 million) contract for building the institute was awarded to NBCC in October.

The institute became operational with the first batch of 50 MBBS students, which started in September 2019, one of the six AIIMSs to become operational in 2019. Saurabh Varshney was appointed director in March 2020 and N.K. Arora was appointed president in May of that year. A second batch of 62 MBBS students enrolled in 2020. Outpatient department (OPD) services were launched in August 2021. On 12 June 2022, the In-Patient Department (IPD) along with Academic and Administrative Block was inaugurated by Shri Narendra Modi. The entire campus is expected to be completely functional by the end of December 2023. In November 2022, Institute has been permitted to run postgraduate courses with 7 number of seats allocated for the INI-CET January 2023 session.

== Campus ==
Construction of the permanent campus started in December 2019 and is almost completed with both opd and ipd block functional, the construction completed by the end of 2023. The entire campus is expected to be finished in December 2023. The administration along with academic block had already been shifted to its permanent campus. Later, AIIMS Deoghar also started it Bsc.Nursing courses with an annual intake of 62 along with its regular MBBS batch of 125 students and MD/MS courses.

== Hospital services ==
The 40-room outpatient department was inaugurated by the then Minister of Health and Family Welfare, Mansukh Mandaviya, on 24 August 2021, including a night shelter facility for the patients and attendants. Online registration facilities were launched on 3 September 2021. On July 12, 2022, the 250-bed in-patient department (IPD) and operation theatre were opened. The newly built ipd block and administration block were also inaugurated by Shri.Narendra Modi on 12 July 2022. The hospital is expected to be completed by the end of 2023 and will be totally functional with 750 beds ipd and opd facilities.

The new building of Deoghar AIIMS has started OPD services and now treating 1200 patients in a day. In the next few days, 3000 patients will be able to be treating in OPD.

== See also ==
- All India Institute of Medical Sciences, New Delhi
- All India Institute of Medical Sciences, Bhubaneswar
- All India Institute of Medical Sciences, Jodhpur
- Ministry of Health and Family Welfare
