= Deoghar =

City in Jharkhand, India

Deoghar Baba Baidyanath Dham and Satsang Nagar
- City
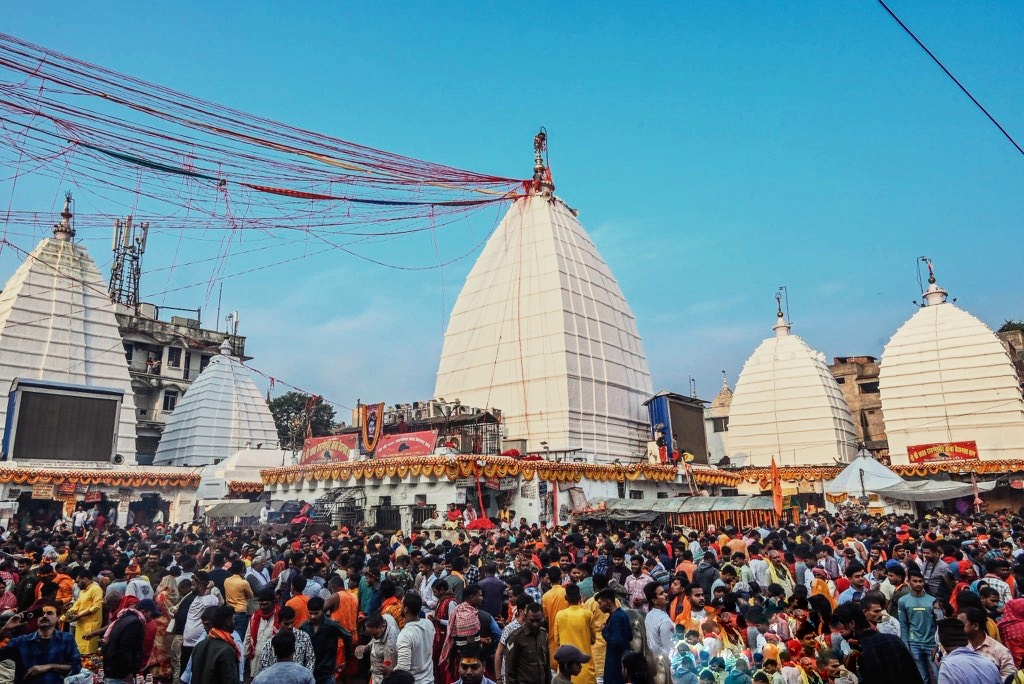
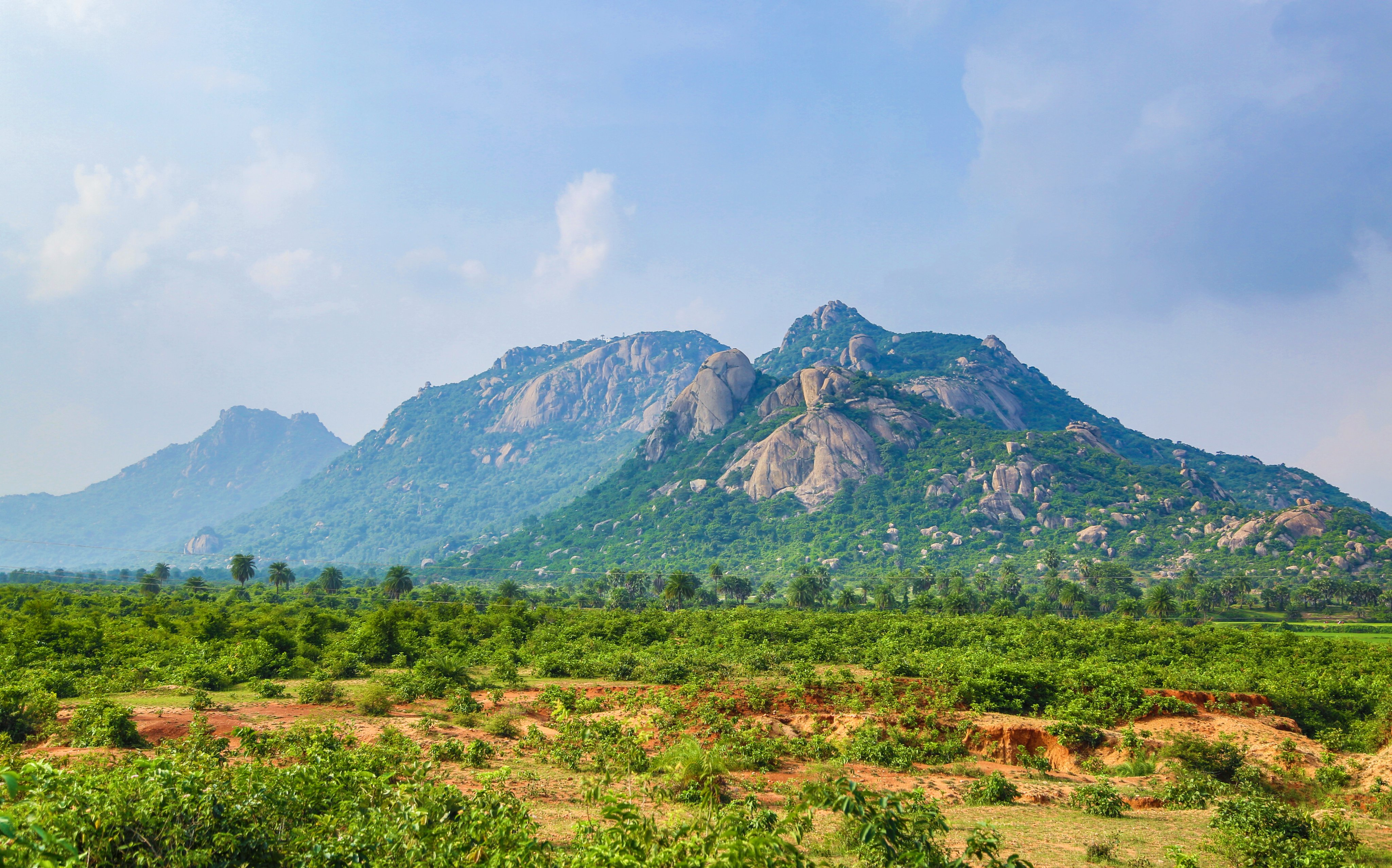
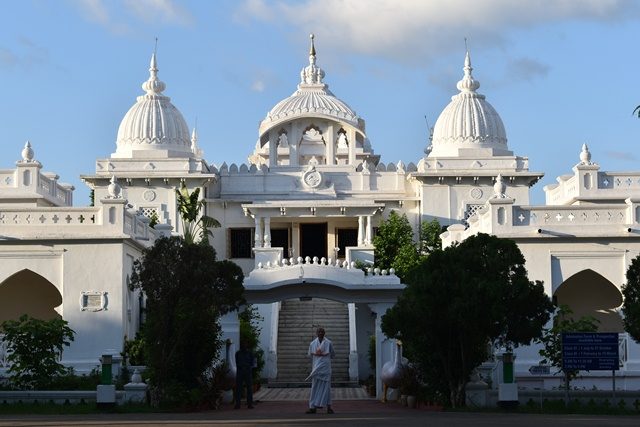
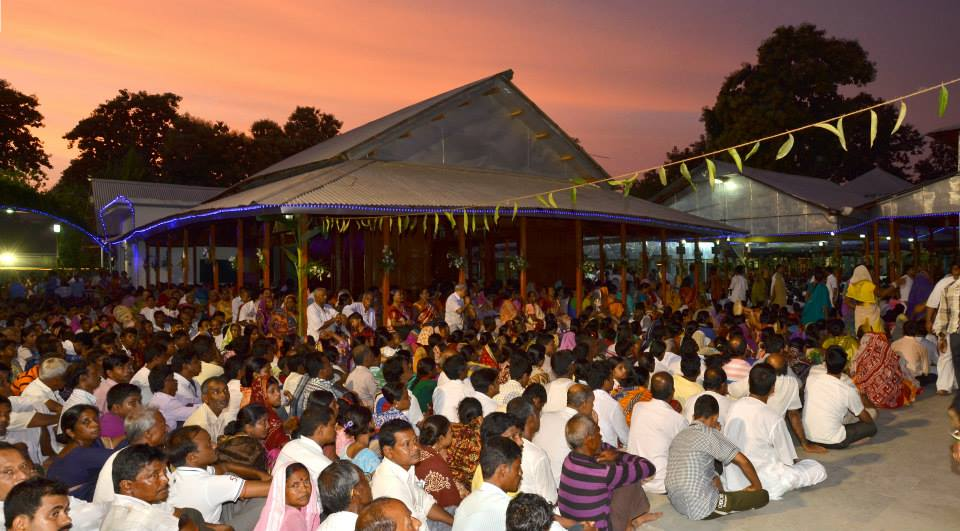
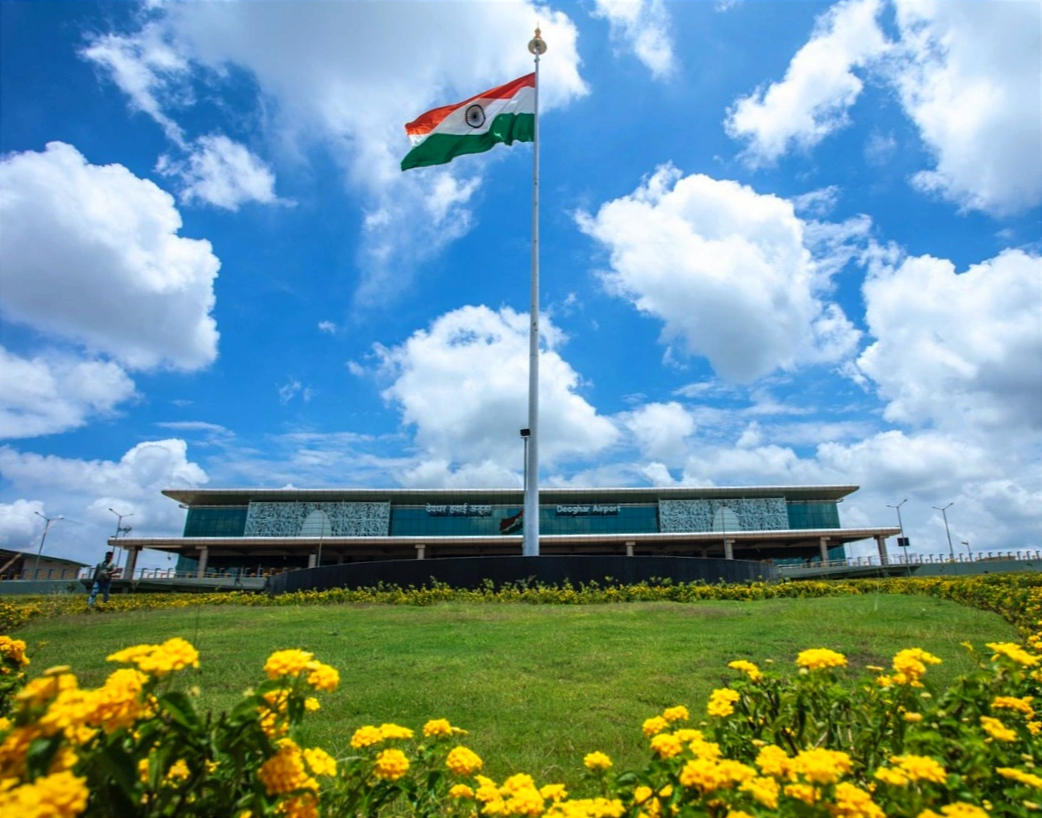
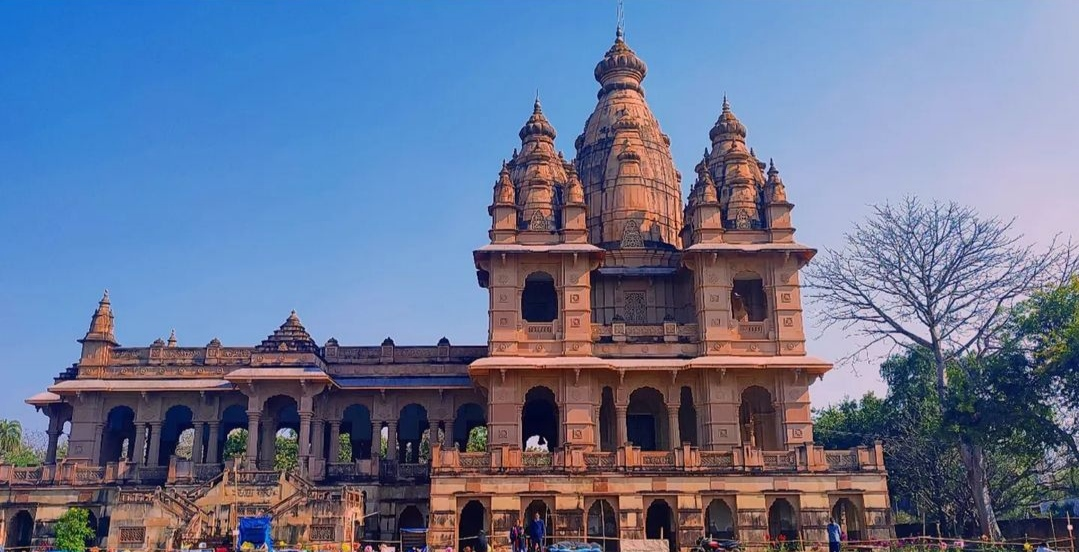
- From top, left to right: Baidyanath Temple, Trikut Hill, Ramakrishna Mission Vidyapith, Deoghar, Prayer at Thakur Anukulchandra Satsang Ashram, Deoghar Airport, Naulakha Temple
- Nickname: Abode of God
- Location within Jharkhand Location within India
- Coordinates: 24.48°N 86.7°E
- Country: India
- State: Jharkhand
- District: Deoghar
- Division: Santhal Parganas
- Region: Anga

Government
  - Type: Municipal Corporation
  - Body: Deoghar Municipal Corporation
  - Mayor: Ravi Kumar Raut
  - District Magistrate and Collector: Saurabh Kumar Bhuwania, IAS
  - Superintendent of Police: Praveen Pushkar, IPS
  - Municipal Commissioner: Sulochana Meena, IAS

Area
  - Total: 119 km^{2} (46 sq mi)
- Elevation: 254 m (833 ft)

Population (2011)
  - Total: 203,123
  - Density: 1,710/km^{2} (4,420/sq mi)

Languages
  - Official: Hindi
  - Regional: Deogharia-Maithili
- Time zone: UTC+5:30 (IST)
- PIN: 814112
- Telephone code: 06432
- Vehicle registration: JH-15
- Sex ratio: 921 ♀ / 1000 ♂
- Lok Sabha constituency: Godda
- MP: Nishikant Dubey (BJP)
- Vidhan Sabha constituency: Deoghar
- MLA: Suresh Paswan (RJD)
- Website: deoghar.nic.in

Deoghar (pronounced Devghar) is a city and a municipal corporation in Deoghar district in the Indian state of Jharkhand. It is also the administrative headquarters of Deoghar district. It is a holy place of Hinduism. The city is primarily known for Baidyanath Temple, one of the 12 Jyotirlingas of Shiva, one of the principal deities in Hinduism. The sacred temples of the city make this a place for pilgrimage and tourists. The city is very sacred to the followers of Hinduism, regardless of sects.

The city is administrative headquarter of Deoghar District which comes under Santhal Parganas division of Jharkhand. It is the fifth largest city in Jharkhand and also known as the cultural capital of Jharkhand.

== Geography ==
=== Location ===
Deoghar is located at 24.48°N 86.69°E. It has an average elevation of 255 metres (833 feet). It is a part of the Indian peninsular plateau which forms a part of the oldest landmass on Earth, Gondwana land. Deoghar is situated on the bank of Ajay river (which originates from Batpar village of Jamui district in Bihar) and its tributary Dadhawa river (which originates from Purnia Lake near Karangarh village 24.595501°N 86.474369°E in Jamui district of Bihar). The city is surrounded with various small relict hills such as Dighriya Pahaad, Nandan Pahaad, Trikuti Pahaad, and Tapovan Pahaad. Dighriya Pahaad forms the western boundary of the city and there is a national park being constructed on these hills. Nandan Pahaad is a children's amusement place and serves as one of the principal recreational places in the city. Tapovan Pahaad has its cultural relevance found in Hindu scriptures. It is one of the amusement places in the city and serves as a habitat for monkeys.

=== Area ===
Deoghar has an area of 119 square kilometres (46 sq mi).

== Demographics ==
=== Population ===
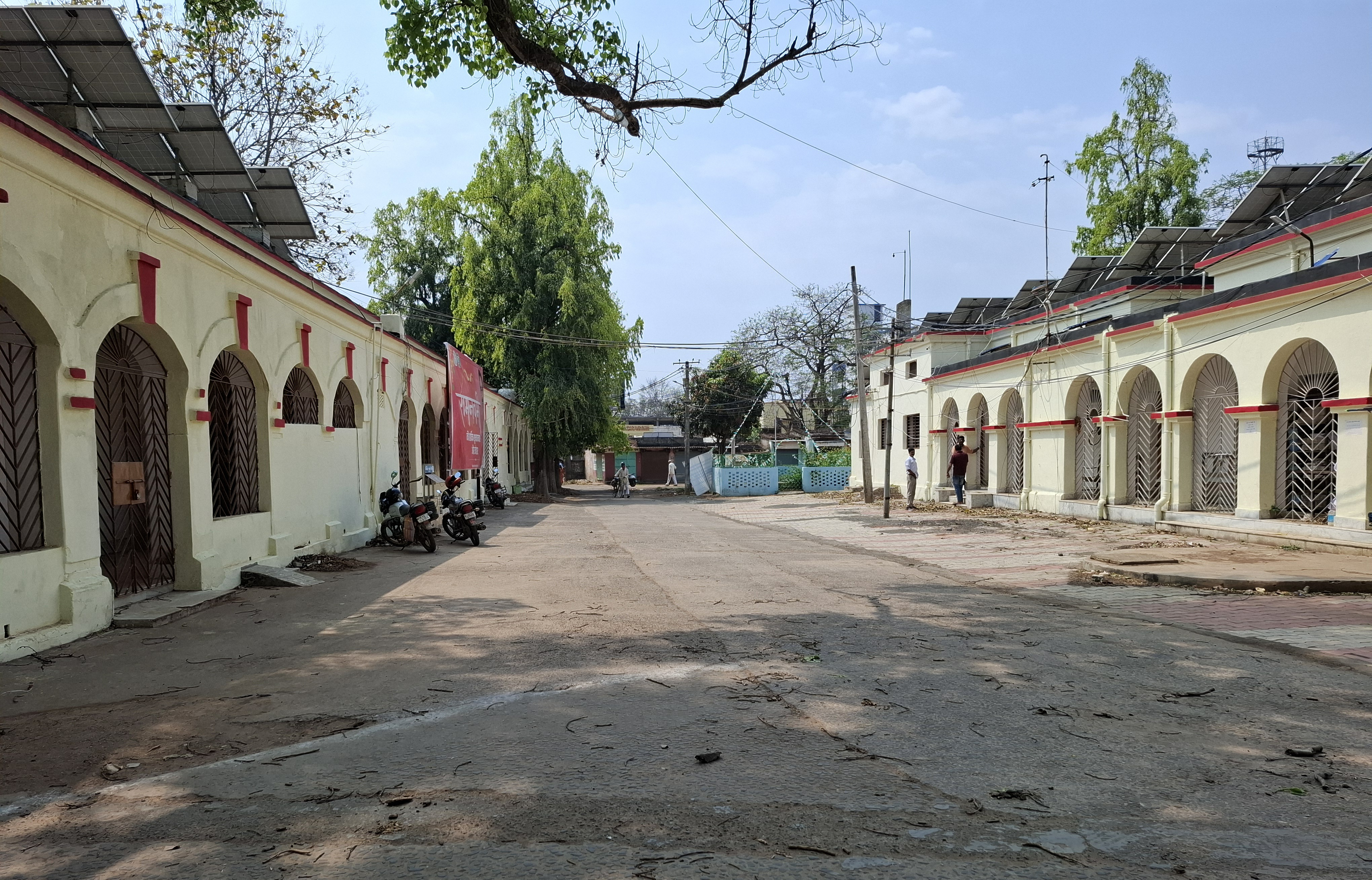
Deoghar District Court

According to the 2011 Census of India, Deoghar had a total population of 203,123, of which 107,997 (53%) were males and 95,126 (47%) were females. Population in the age range 0–6 years was 26,893 (13%). The total number of literate persons in Deoghar was 150,988 out of which 85,439 are males while 65,549 are females. Average literacy rate of Deoghar city is 85.68 percent of which male and female literacy was 91.24 and 79.37 percent respectively.

=== Religion ===
Hinduism is the prominent religion in Deoghar followed by 94.30% of the population. Christianity is second most followed religion in the district by 2.65% of the people. Minorities are Muslims 2.23%, Jainism by 0.07%, Sikhism by 0.03% and Buddhism by 0.03%. Around 0.04% stated other religion and approximately 0.04% stated 'no particular religion.

Religion in Deoghar District (2022)
Religion	Percent
Hinduism	94.30%
Christianity	2.65%
Islam	2.23%
Jainism	0.07%
Buddhism	0.03%
Sikhism	0.03%
Others	0.04%
Not Stated	0.04%

== Administration and local governance ==
Deoghar is the administrative headquarters of Deoghar district and Deoghar subdivision. The district administration is headed by the Deputy Commissioner (DC), an officer of Indian Administrative Service, who is the chief district officer. The Deoghar subdivision is headed by the Sub-Divisional Officer (SDO), who is responsible for the administration of the subdivision under the district administration.

While, Deoghar Police acts as the primary law-enforcement agency responsible for maintaining law and order in the city. It comprises multiple police stations, each headed by an Officer-in-Charge (O.C). The police stations are then supervised by the Deputy Superintendent of Police (DSP), who functions under the Superintendent of Police (SP), an officer of the Indian Police Service (IPS), of Deoghar district. The SP has overall responsibility for policing and the maintenance of law and order throughout the district, including Deoghar city.

In terms of local governance, Deoghar Municipal Corporation is the urban local body responsible for administering the city of Deoghar. It provides municipal services and manages civic infrastructure within its jurisdiction, including water supply, sanitation, solid waste management, roads, drainage and street lighting.

== Economy ==
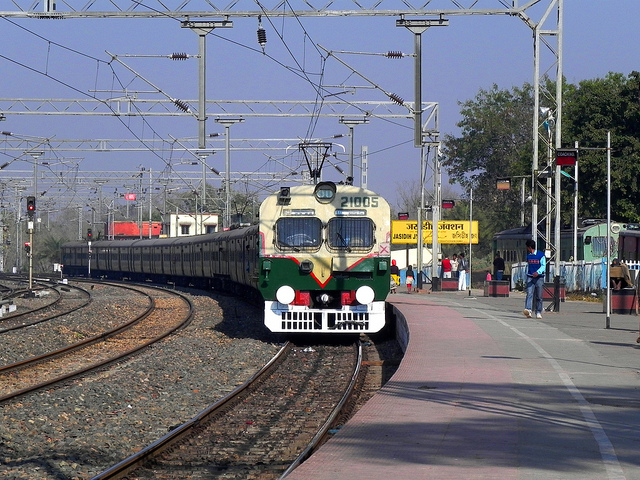
Jasidih - The main and major industrial hub of the city of Deoghar

The economy of Deoghar is largely dependent on religious tourism and hospitality. Deoghar is the fifth largest city in the state of Jharkhand.

Industry in Deoghar is mainly based on IT, agriculture, hospitality, petroleum, tourism, and in the service sector. Various small and middle scale industries are present in Deoghar. Some large industrial projects are also present:

- Jalsar Solar Park: Established by Jharkhand Renewable Energy Development Agency
- Plastic Park and Plastic Recycling unit
- Central Institute of Plastics Engineering & Technology

Indian Oil Corporation has one of its terminals in Deoghar, located at Badladih, Jasidih.

== Culture ==
Deoghar city is usually referred to as the cultural capital of Jharkhand. The official languages of the city of Deoghar are Hindi and Khortha, while other native languages like Angika and Santhali are also spoken.

== Gallery ==
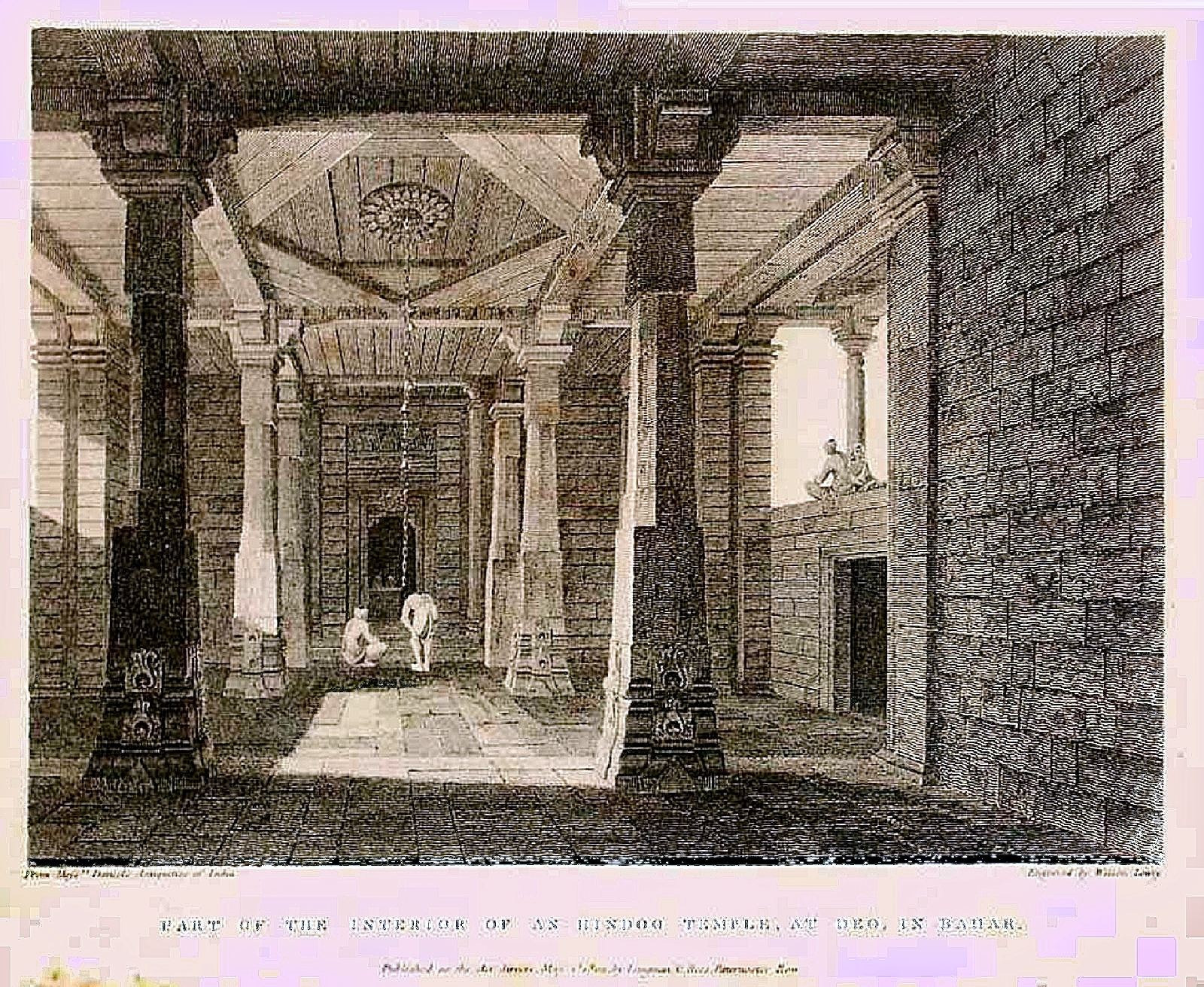
Part of the interior of a Hindu Temple, at Deo, in Bahar, from Rees's Cyclopedia, 1802

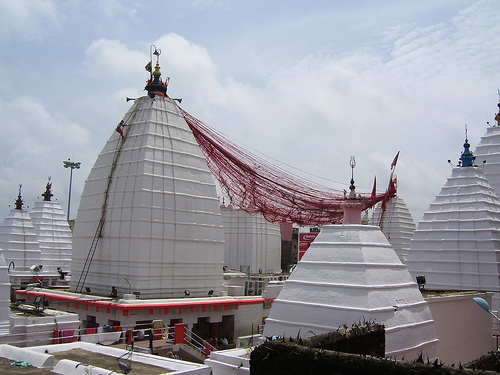
Baidyanath Dham

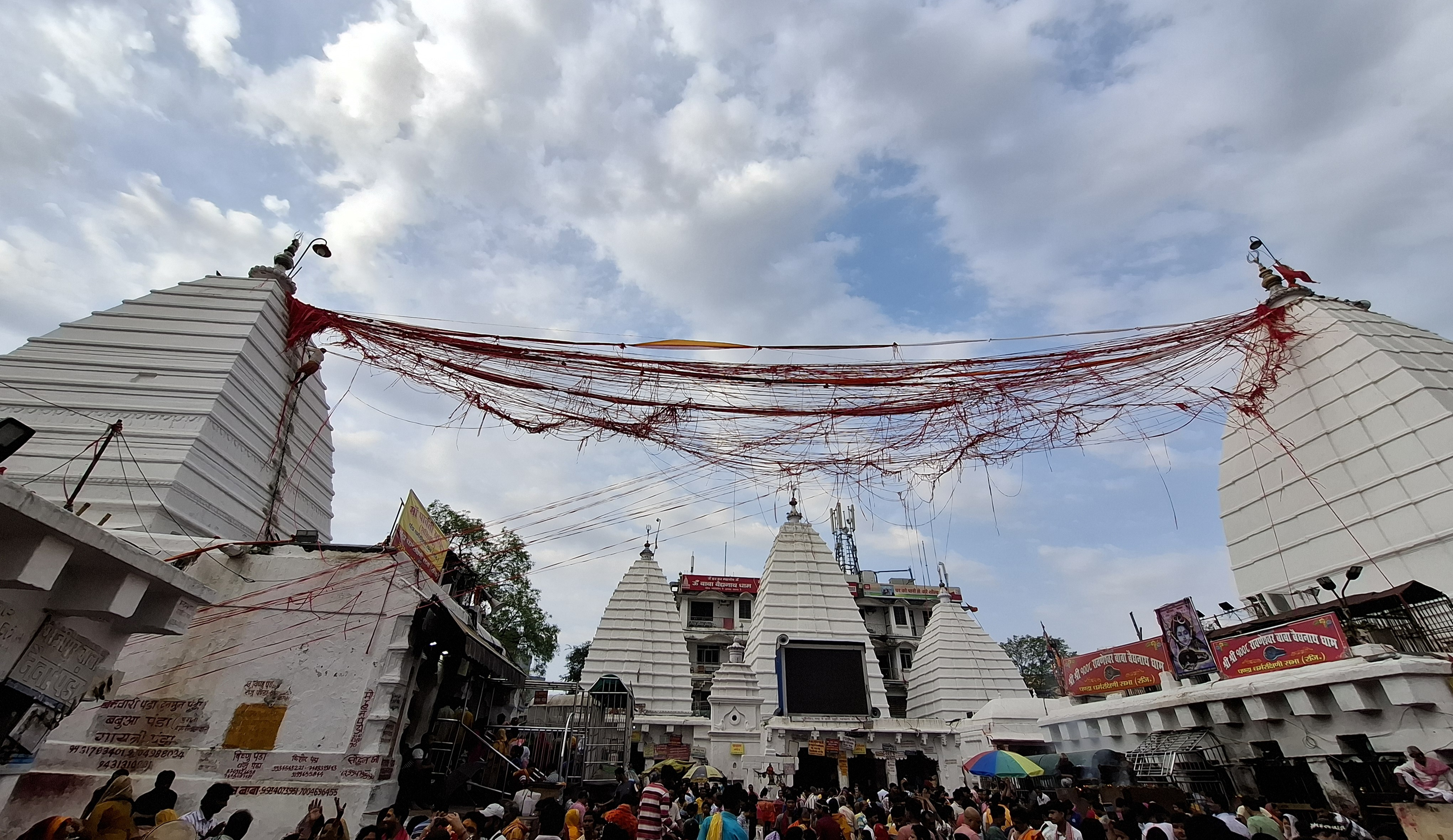
Baidyanath and Parbati temple

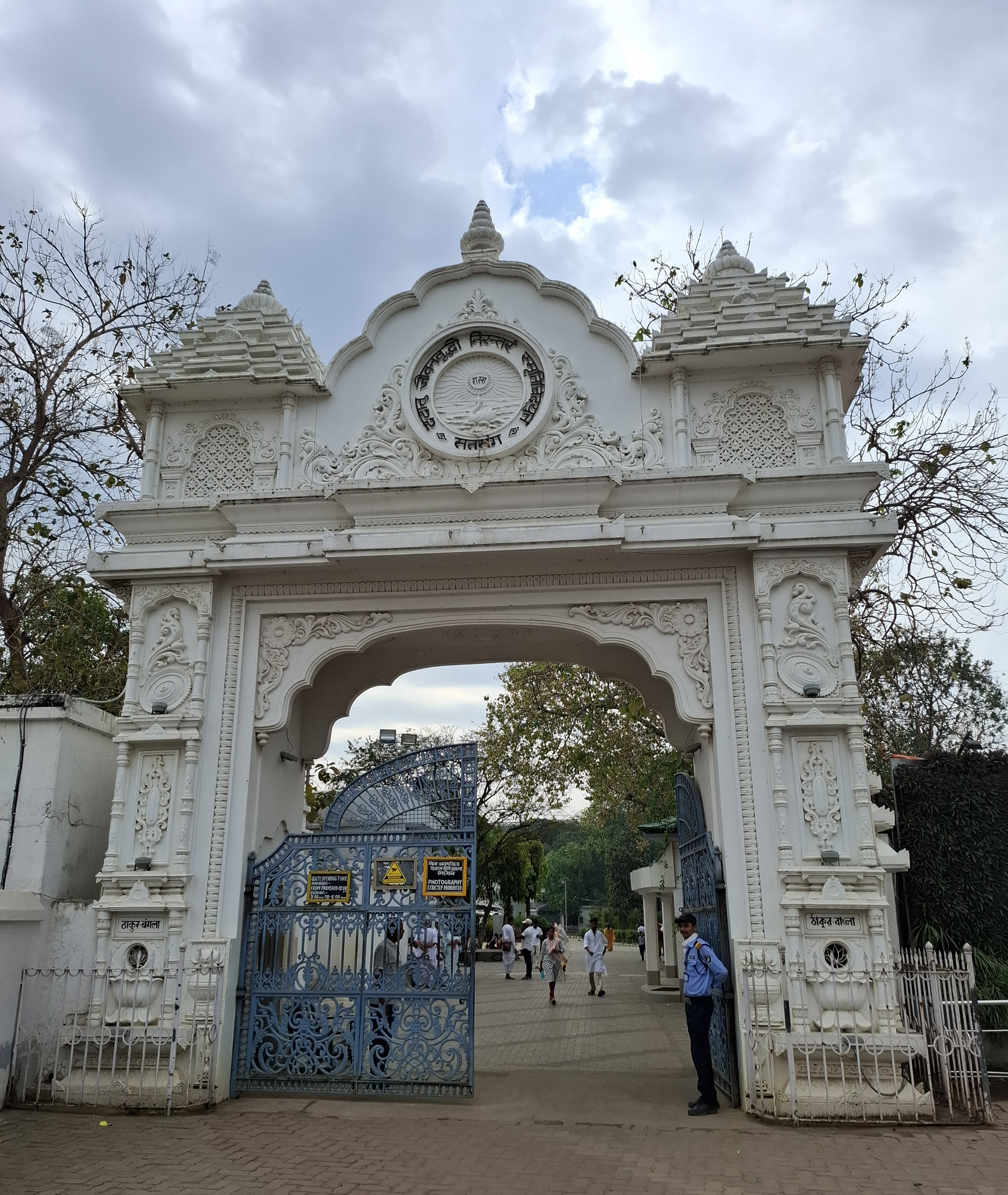
Depghar Satsang Ashram

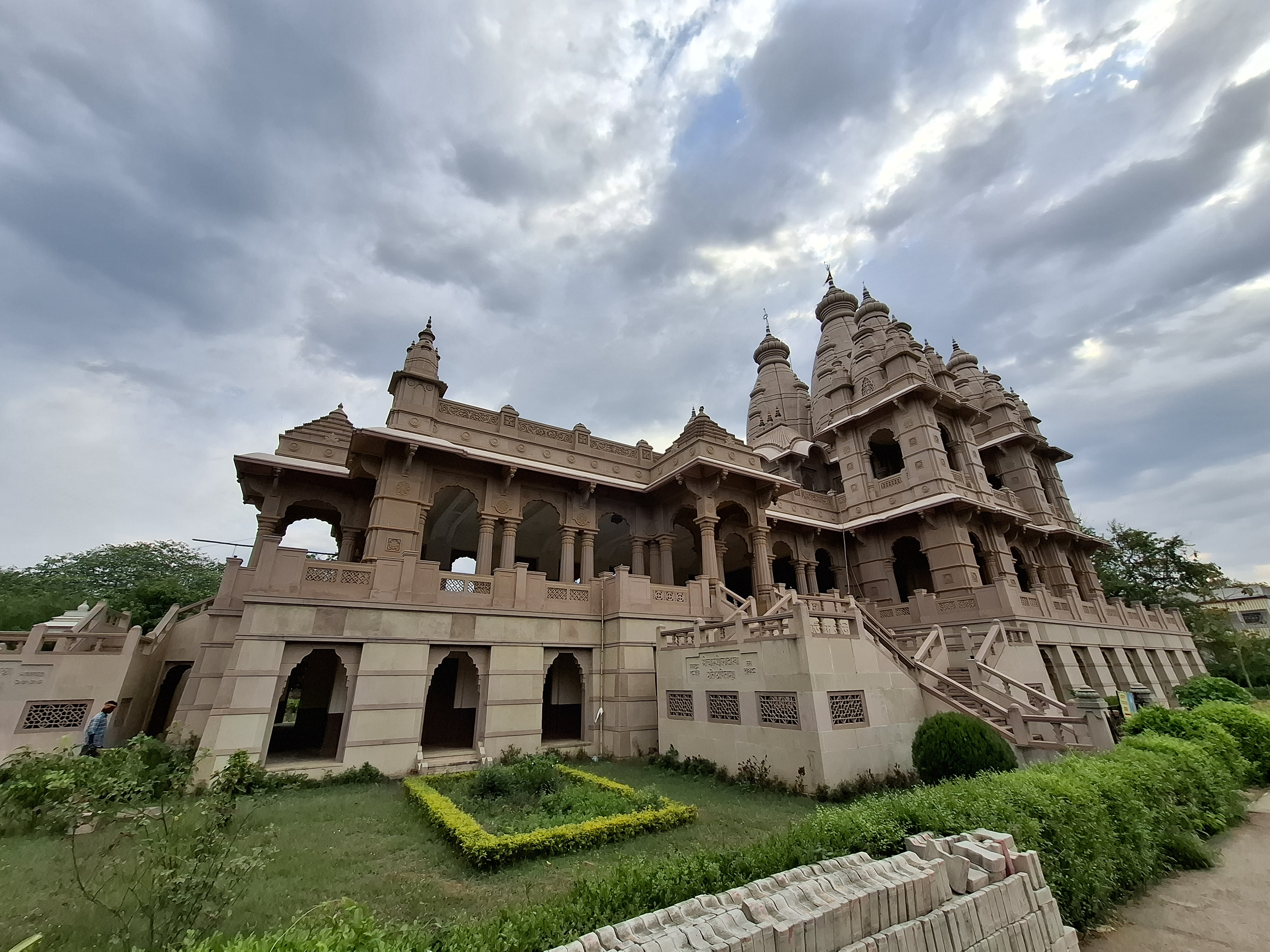
Naulakkha Temple

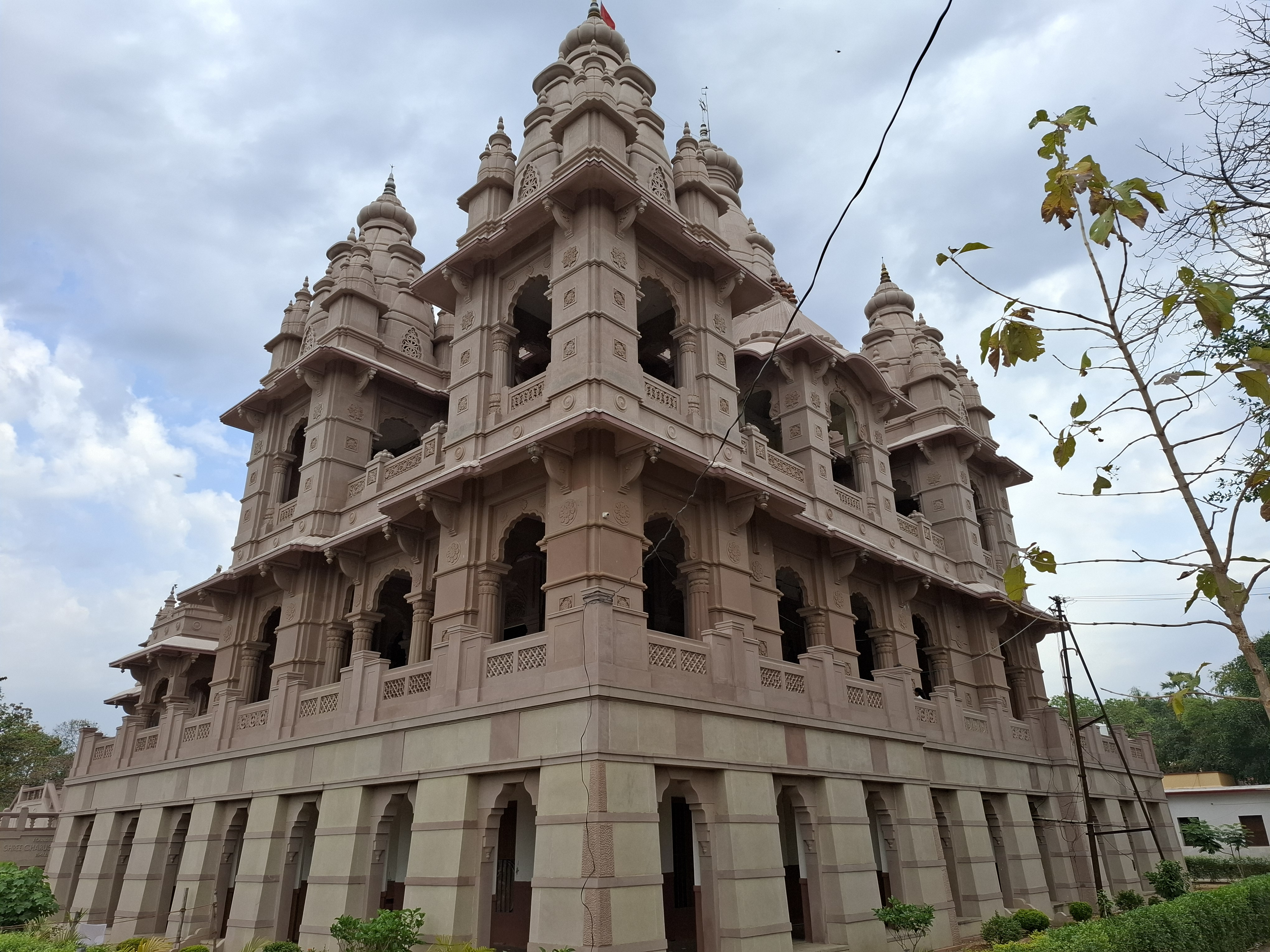

== Tourism ==
The holy city of Deoghar is home to various tourist attractions such as:

- Baidyanath Temple: a prominent Hindu shrine dedicated to Lord Shiva, revered as one of the twelve Jyotirlingas and also recognized as one of the Shakti Peethas in India.
- Tapovan Caves and Hills: This series of caves and hills is located 10 km from Deoghar and has a temple of Shiva called Taponath Mahadeva. In one of the caves a Shiva lingam is installed, and it is said that Sage Valmiki came here for penance.
- Naulakha Mandir: The temple stands 146 ft high. It is very similar to the temple of Ramakrishna Mission in Belur Math and it is dedicated to Radha-Krishna. Since its construction cost ₹9 lakh, it is also known as Naulakha temple.
- Basukinath Temple: Basukinath is a place of worship for Hindus and is located in the Dumka district of Jharkhand on the Deoghar-Dumka state highway. Pilgrims visit the temple each year from all of India to worship the presiding deity Shiva. The crowd at the temple drastically increases in the month of Shravan. It is widely believed that the Basukinath Temple is the court of Baba Bhole Nath. The temples of Shiva and Parvati are located in front of each other in the Basukinath Temple. The gates to both of these temples open in the evening, and it is believed that Shiva and Parvati meet each other at this time.
- Satsang Ashram: It's the holy place where Sri Sri Thakur Anukuchandra had spent his life. Many devotees come everyday here to have darsan of Thakur Parivar . This is the epicenter of the Satsang Revolution and also the chief centre of this movement. In the Ashram many devotees live permanently as natives.
- Trikut Hilll: trendy picnic spot and a pilgrimage site located 21 km from the main city.
- Ramakrishna Mission Vidyapith, Deoghar.

== Education ==
- Deoghar College
- A.S.College
- All India Institute of Medical Sciences, Deoghar
- Birla Institute of Technology, Deoghar (Ranchi Offcampus)
- Jawahar Navodaya Vidyalaya, Deoghar
- Ramakrishna Mission Vidyapith, Deoghar
- Anandalaya Public School, Beside Jagadishpur Branch Post Office, Madhupur, Deoghar - CBSE
- G D DAV public School , Satar Road , Bhandarkola , Deoghar

== Transportation ==
=== Airways ===
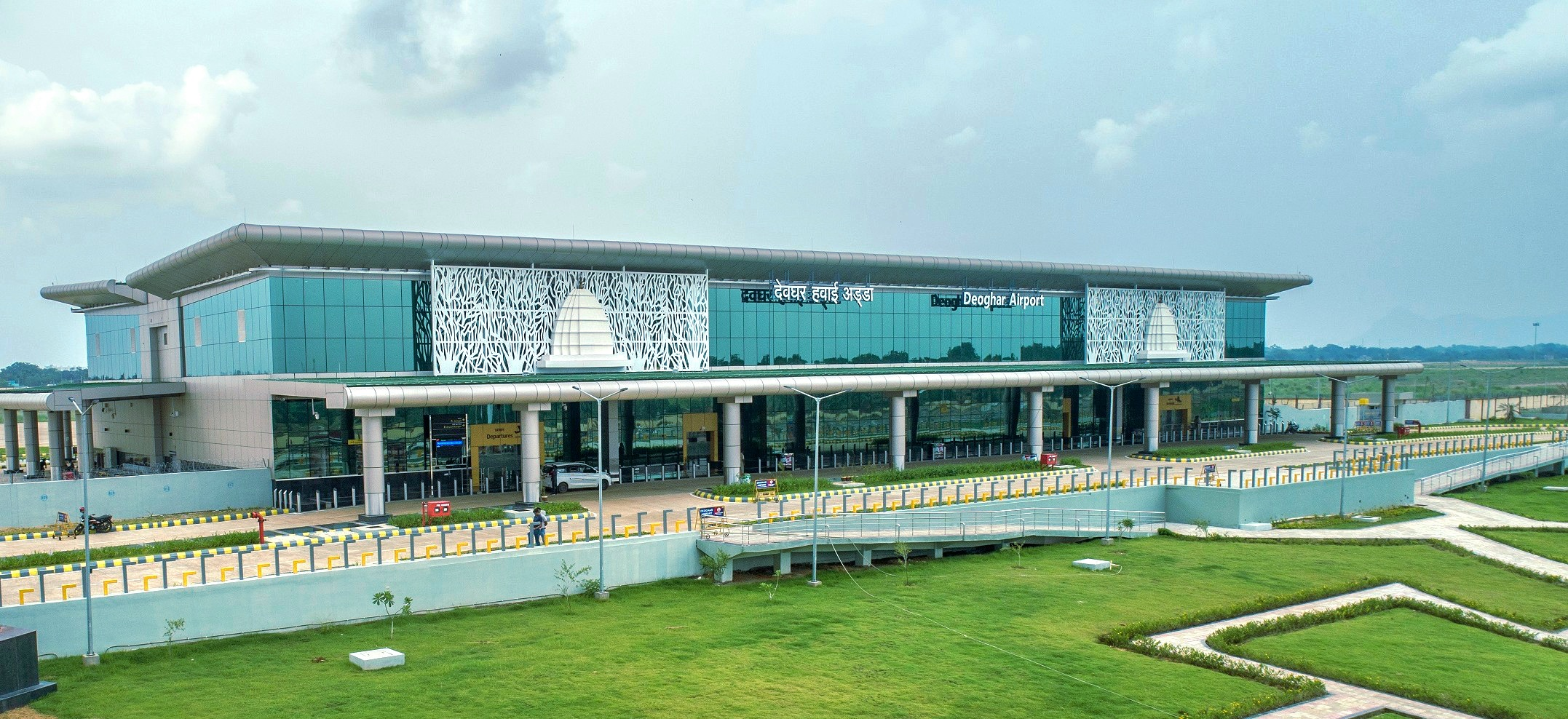
Terminal building of Deoghar Airport

- Deoghar Airport (IATA: DGH, ICAO: VEDO), served the Deoghar city, which is approximately 12 km (7.4 mi) from the city centre. The airport was inaugurated by Prime Minister Narendra Modi on July 12, 2022. As of now IndiGo operates its flight services only for Ranchi, Patna, Bengaluru, Mumbai, Kolkata and Delhi.

=== Railways ===
- Jasidih Junction is the nearest train station serving Deoghar. It is located on the Howrah–New Delhi main line train route by which it is connected from all over the country.
- Deoghar Junction is the railway station located in the city. It is on the Jasidih-Dumka-Rampurhat & Jasidih-Banka-Bhagalpur line. There are trains to Ranchi, Dumka, Rampurhat, Munger, Bhagalpur, Banka, Agartala etc.
- Baidyanathdham Deoghar railway station is a terminal station located in the city centre connected directly by jasidih junction. It mostly serves passengers trains but some express trains are planned to be started from here as well including a Vande Bharat to Varanasi.

=== Roadways ===
- NH 333 which starts from Deoghar city which connect it by Jamui and Munger city in Bihar
- NH 114A which passes through Deoghar city by which it is connected by Giridih and Dumka city.
- NH 133 which starts 11 km away from Deoghar city which connect it by Godda city.

== Healthcare ==
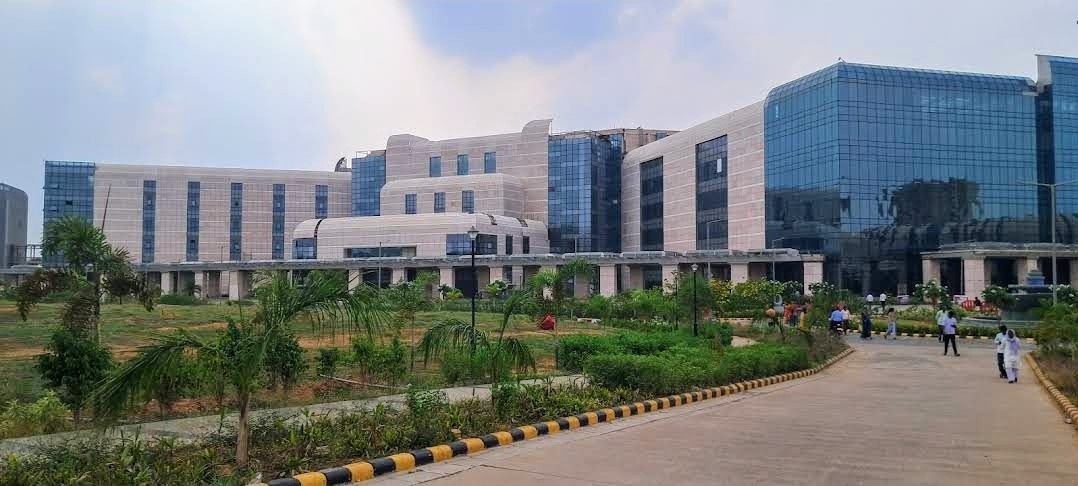
Campus view of AIIMS, Deoghar

- All India Institute of Medical Sciences, Deoghar is a medical school started by government of India. A 40-room outpatient department was inaugurated in 2021, including a night shelter facility for the patients and attendants. Online registration facilities were launched on 3 September 2021. On July 12, 2022, the 250-bed in-patient department (IPD) and operation theatre is opened for public for treatment facilities. The rest 500- bed in-patient department is soon to completed for the patients, making it total 750 beds by the beginning of year 2023.
- District Hospital, Deoghar offer varies treatment and surgeries for patients.

== Notable people ==
- Asutosh Mookerjee – educationist and judge who spent time in Madhupur, in present-day Deoghar district
- Suresh Paswan – Indian politician and Member of the Jharkhand Legislative Assembly from Deoghar
- Swami Satyananda Saraswati – founder of the Bihar School of Yoga, associated with Rikhiyapith in Deoghar district

== See also ==
- List of cities in Jharkhand
- List of cities in Jharkhand by population
- Deoghar (community development block)
