= Narayan Das (Jharkhand politician) =

Indian politician

Member of Jharkhand Legislative Assembly
- In office 2014–2024
- Preceded by: Suresh Paswan
- Succeeded by: Suresh Paswan
- Constituency: Deoghar

Personal details
- Political party: Bharatiya Janata Party
- Profession: Politician

Narayan Das (born 1966) is an Indian politician and a former Member of Jharkhand Legislative Assembly associated with Bharatiya Janata Party. He has been elected for two consecutive terms (2014-19 and 2019-24), from Deoghar Assembly constituency, which is reserved for Scheduled Caste community, in Deoghar district. In 2024 Jharkhand Legislative Assembly election, he lost the seat to Suresh Paswan of Rashtriya Janata Dal.

== Early life and education ==
Das is from Deoghar, Deoghar district, Jharkhand. He is the son of Dasrath Das. He passed his Class 12 in 1994 at C.N.B College, Hathiyawa, Munger and later discontinued his studies.

== Career ==
Das won from Deoghar Assembly constituency representing the Bharatiya Janata Party in the 2019 Jharkhand Legislative Assembly election. He polled 95,491 votes and defeated his nearest rival, Suresh Paswan of the Rashtriya Janata Dal, by a margin of 2,624 votes. He first became an MLA winning the Deoghar seat in the 2014 Jharkhand Legislative Assembly election.
