= Birla Institute of Technology, Deoghar =

Extension Center of Birla Institute of Technology, Mesra

Birla Institute of Technology (Deoghar)
- BIT Deoghar
- Motto: सा विद्या या विमुक्तये (Sā Vidyā Yā Vimuktaye)
- Motto in English: Learning is that which Liberates
- Type: Government Institute
- Established: 2007; 19 years ago
- Parent institution: BIT Mesra
- Affiliations: AICTE, UGC
- Chancellor: C. K. Birla
- Vice-Chancellor: Dr. Indranil Manna
- Director: Dr. Swapan Kumar Ghorai
- Location: Deoghar, Jharkhand, India; 24.5136868°N 86.6571006°E
- Campus: Rural
- Website: BIT Mesra, Deoghar Campus
- Location in Jharkhand, India Birla Institute of Technology, Deoghar (India)

Birla Institute of Technology, Deoghar is a public educational institution located in Deoghar, Jharkhand, India. It functions as one of the off-campuses of Birla Institute of Technology, Mesra, Ranchi and offers undergraduate programs in engineering and technology.

== History ==
Birla Institute of Technology, Deoghar Campus was established in 2007, on the request of Government of Jharkhand. The institute is controlled administratively and academically by BIT Mesra.

== Academic programmes ==
The following undergraduate courses are conducted at BIT Deoghar:

- Bachelor of Engineering (B.E.) in Computer Science Engineering
- Bachelor of Engineering (B.E.) in Electrical & Electronics Engineering
- Bachelor of Engineering (B.E.) in Electronics & Communication Engineering
- Bachelor of Engineering (B.E.) in Mechanical Engineering.
- Bachelor of Engineering (B.E.) in Production Engineering.

Also some new courses have been started from the session (2020–2021).

- Bachelor of Business Administration (BBA).
- Bachelor of Computer Application (BCA).

The admissions are by the JOSSA/CSAB counselling for the Btech programs.

== Campus ==
The campus is located in Deoghar district, 2 km from Jasidih railway station. Deoghar is a tourist spot which has a religious background. It is well known for Baidyanath Dham Temple, which is among the 12 jyotirlingas of lord Shiva.

The campus has 25 acres of academic space, staff quarters, two boys' hostels and one girls' hostel, dispensary, playground, library, gymnasium, canteen and stationery shop. It also has an SBI ATM facility. There Are cricket and football facilities and students are seen playing these sports.

== Festivals ==
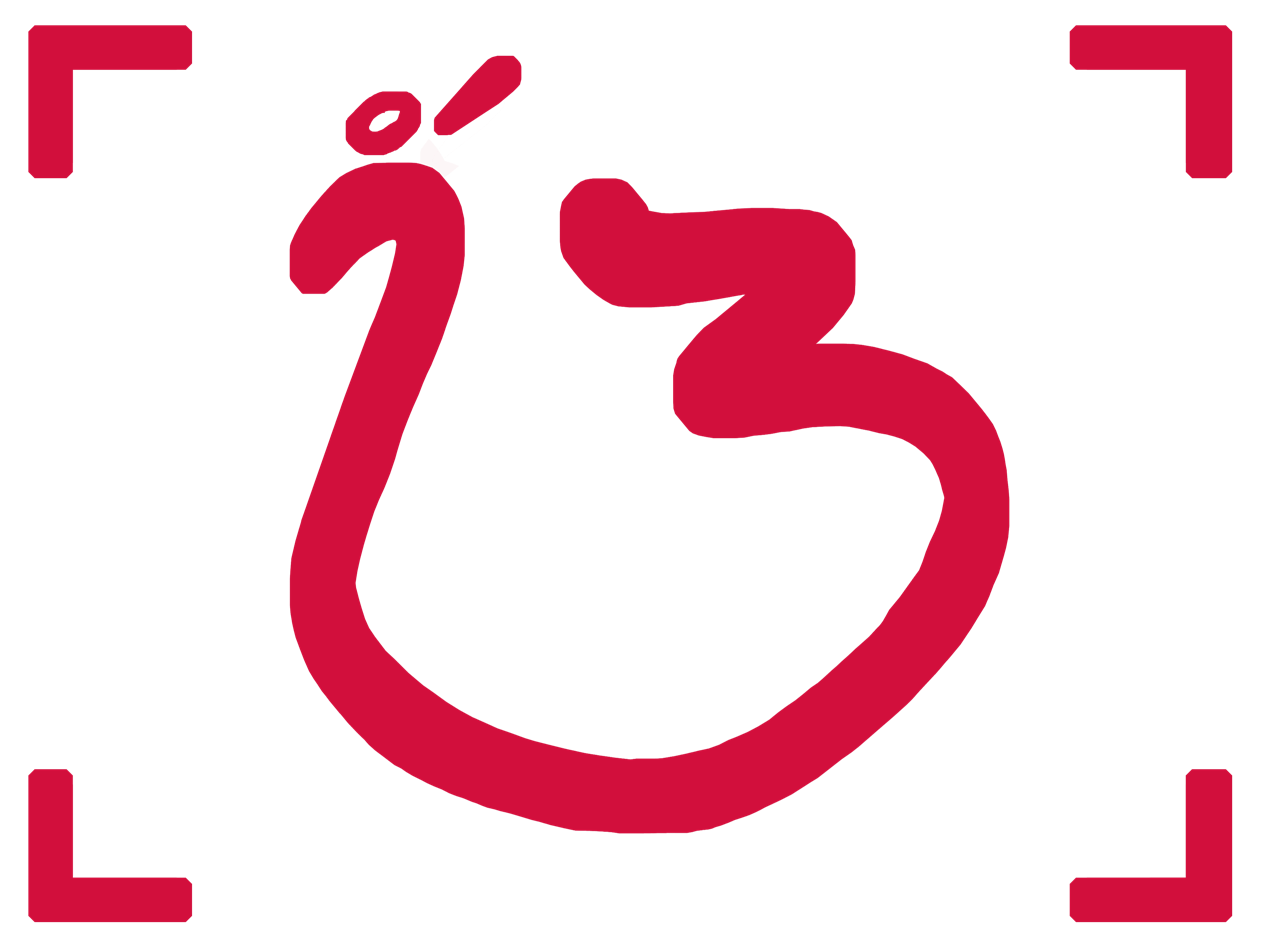

=== Utthaan ===
Utthaan is the technocultural festival of the BIT-Deoghar. Events include robotics, workshops, fashionista, BIT-MUN, Nukkad Natak, BIT Radio, CS GO, Roadies and Pro night. Special guest appearances at Utthaan have included Dev Negi (playback singer) Geet Sagar (X-Factor India).

=== Aurora ===
It is the annual fest of the Literary Society. It includes scavenger hunts, extempore and quizzes.

=== Dandiya Night ===
Dandiya Night is the festival of BIT-Deoghar. It is a night event filled with colors of joy and happiness among all the glittering faces in ethnic costumes.

=== Aagaaz ===
Aagaaz is the cultural festival of BIT-D, which seeks to bring out new talents of student. It was first held in 2017. The festival includes events in the fields of music, dance and spoken arts.

== Club and societies ==
- IEEE Student Branch
- Automobile Society
- DRISTI
- Photographic Society
- Literary Society
- Sports Club
- Music Society (Octaves)
- Cinematic Club
- NAPS BITD
- Dramatic society
- Robotics Society
- FINE ARTS Society(FAS)
