= Suresh Paswan =

Indian politician

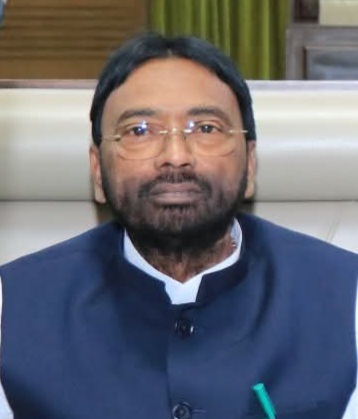

Member of the Jharkhand Legislative Assembly
- Incumbent
- Assumed office 2024
- Preceded by: Narayan Das
- Constituency: Deoghar
- In office 2009–2014
- Preceded by: Kameshwar Nath Das
- Succeeded by: Narayan Das
- Constituency: Deoghar

Cabinet Minister, Government of Jharkhand
- In office 04 August 2013 – 28 December 2014

Personal details
- Citizenship: India
- Party: Rashtriya Janata Dal
- Occupation: Politician, Agriculturist

Suresh Paswan (Satish Paswan) is an Indian politician. He is currently serving as the MLA of Jharkhand Legislative Assembly from Deoghar Assembly constituency. He won the 2024 Jharkhand Legislative Assembly election.

Previously, he contested and won the 1995 Bihar Legislative Assembly election and 2000 Bihar Legislative Assembly election from Deoghar Assembly constituency . Also, he held the position of Tourism and Urban Development minister during First Hemant Soren ministry.
