= Deoghar Assembly constituency =

Deoghar
- Constituency No. 15 for the Jharkhand Legislative Assembly

Constituency details
- Country: India
- Region: East India
- State: Jharkhand
- District: Deoghar
- Lok Sabha constituency: Godda
- Established: 2000
- Total electors: 364,659
- Reservation: SC

Member of Legislative Assembly
- 5th Jharkhand Legislative Assembly
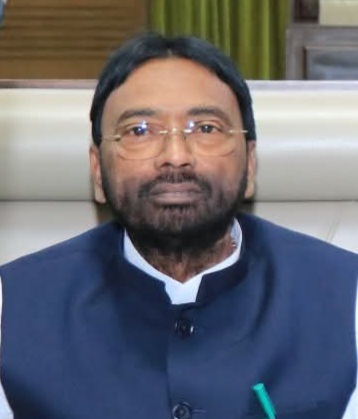
- Incumbent Suresh Paswan
- Party: RJD
- Alliance: MGB
- Elected year: 2024

Deoghar Assembly constituency is an assembly constituency in the Indian state of Jharkhand.

== Overview ==
Deoghar Assembly constituency covers: Deoghar town and Mohanpur Police Stations and Jasidih Police Station (excluding Kusmil, Chanddih, Pathra and Basbariya gram panchayats) in Deoghar district.

Deoghar Assembly constituency is part of Godda (Lok Sabha constituency).

== Members of Legislative Assembly ==
Election	Member	Party
Bihar Legislative Assembly
1952	Bhubaneswar Pandey	Forward Bloc
1957	Shailbala Roy	Indian National Congress
1957	Mangulal Das	Indian National Congress
1962	Shailbala Roy	Indian National Congress
1967	Baidyanath Das	Bharatiya Jana Sangh
1969	Baidyanath Das	Indian National Congress
1972	Baidyanath Das	Indian National Congress
1977	Veena Rani	Janata Party
1980	Baidyanath Das	Indian National Congress
1985	Baidyanath Das	Indian National Congress
1990	Baidyanath Das	Indian National Congress
1995	Suresh Paswan	Janata Dal
2000	Suresh Paswan	Rashtriya Janata Dal
Jharkhand Legislative Assembly
2005	Kameshwar Nath Das	Janata Dal (United)
2009	Suresh Paswan	Rashtriya Janata Dal
2014	Narayan Das	Bharatiya Janata Party
2019	Narayan Das	Bharatiya Janata Party
2024	Suresh Paswan	Rashtriya Janata Dal

== Election results ==
=== Assembly Election 2024 ===
2024 Jharkhand Legislative Assembly election: Deoghar
Party	Candidate	Votes	%	±%
RJD	Suresh Paswan	156,079	53.53%	▲13.65
BJP	Narayan Das	1,16,358	39.91%	▼1.10
Independent	Bajrangi Mahtha	4,414	1.51%	New
BSP	Gyan Ranjan	3,854	1.32%	▼0.08
JLKM	Angrej Das	3,527	1.21%	New
Independent	Basant Kumar Anand	2,013	0.69%	New
NOTA	None of the Above	3,906	1.34%	▼0.97
Margin of victory		39,721	13.62%	▲12.50
Turnout		2,91,577	66.61%	▲2.75
Registered electors		4,37,732		▲20.04
RJD gain from BJP		Swing	▲12.52	

=== Assembly Election 2019 ===
2019 Jharkhand Legislative Assembly election: Deoghar
Party	Candidate	Votes	%	±%
BJP	Narayan Das	95,491	41.01%	▼1.30
RJD	Suresh Paswan	92,867	39.88%	▲18.33
JVM(P)	Nirmala Bharti	9,970	4.28%	▼3.67
LJP	Bajrangi Mahtha	6,394	2.75%	New
AJSU	Santosh Paswan	4,528	1.94%	New
Independent	Gonda Lal Das	4,012	1.72%	New
BSP	Chandrashekhar Rajak	3,269	1.40%	New
NOTA	Nota	5,381	2.31%	▼0.34
Margin of victory		2,624	1.13%	▼19.63
Turnout		2,32,865	63.86%	▼0.93
Registered electors		3,64,659		▲8.63
BJP hold		Swing	▼1.30	

=== Assembly Election 2014 ===
2014 Jharkhand Legislative Assembly election: Deoghar
Party	Candidate	Votes	%	±%
BJP	Narayan Das	92,022	42.31%	New
RJD	Suresh Paswan	46,870	21.55%	▼14.85
JMM	Nirmala Bharti	23,459	10.79%	▲1.88
JVM(P)	Santosh Paswan	17,289	7.95%	▼15.43
Independent	Bajarangi Mahatha	16,859	7.75%	New
Independent	Mohan Kumar	2,762	1.27%	New
BMP	Manoj Prasad Turi	2,370	1.09%	New
NOTA	None of the Above	5,761	2.65%	New
Margin of victory		45,152	20.76%	▲7.74
Turnout		2,17,504	64.79%	▲17.57
Registered electors		3,35,691		▲16.33
BJP gain from RJD		Swing	▲5.91	

=== Assembly Election 2009 ===
2009 Jharkhand Legislative Assembly election: Deoghar
Party	Candidate	Votes	%	±%
RJD	Suresh Paswan	49,602	36.40%	▲13.45
JVM(P)	Baldeo Das	31,862	23.38%	New
JD(U)	Kameshwar Nath Das	13,909	10.21%	▼19.34
JMM	Sanjay Kumar	12,131	8.90%	▼7.52
BSP	Dharmraj Kumar	4,631	3.40%	▼2.33
AITC	Hari Prasad Singh	4,422	3.25%	New
Independent	Sujit Kumar Das	3,655	2.68%	New
Margin of victory		17,740	13.02%	▲6.42
Turnout		1,36,268	47.22%	▼4.05
Registered electors		2,88,569		▲1.52
RJD gain from JD(U)		Swing	▲6.85	

=== Assembly Election 2005 ===
2005 Jharkhand Legislative Assembly election: Deoghar
Party	Candidate	Votes	%	±%
JD(U)	Kameshwar Nath Das	43,065	29.55%	▲6.21
RJD	Suresh Paswan	33,442	22.95%	▼18.12
JMM	Manoj Kumar Das	23,930	16.42%	▲9.81
LJP	Shankar Paswan	9,351	6.42%	New
INC	Rajendra Das	8,548	5.86%	▼16.59
BSP	Nirmala Bharti	8,354	5.73%	▲3.04
Independent	Sunil Mahtha	6,923	4.75%	New
Margin of victory		9,623	6.60%	▼11.13
Turnout		1,45,746	51.27%	▼1.16
Registered electors		2,84,246		▲26.95
JD(U) gain from RJD		Swing	▼11.52	

=== Assembly Election 2000 ===
2000 Bihar Legislative Assembly election: Deoghar
Party	Candidate	Votes	%	±%
RJD	Suresh Paswan	48,216	41.07%	New
JD(U)	Shankar Paswan	27,398	23.34%	New
INC	Kameshwar Nath Das	26,362	22.45%	New
JMM	Raghunath Das	7,757	6.61%	New
BSP	Ramdeo Prasad Das	3,165	2.70%	New
Independent	Dharmraj Kumar	2,489	2.12%	New
NCP	Sanjay Kumar	1,228	1.05%	New
Margin of victory		20,818	17.73%	
Turnout		1,17,405	53.11%	
Registered electors		2,23,904		
RJD win (new seat)				

== See also ==
- Mohanpur
- List of states of India by type of legislature
