= 2008 Simaria by-election =

- 4 February 2008
	CPI	JVM
Candidate	Ram Chandra Ram	Jay Prakash Singh Bhogta	Yogendra Nath Baitha
Party	CPI	JVM(P)	INC
Popular vote	30,700	23,092	19,700
Percentage	26.31%	19.79%	16.88%

On 4 February 2008 a by-election was held in for the Simaria (SC) seat of the Legislative Assembly of the Indian state of Jharkhand. The by-election was called after the death of the sitting MLA Upendra Nath Das.

== Precedents ==
Bharatiya Janata Party legislator Upendra Nath Das, who had been elected from Simaria in the 2005 Jharkhand Legislative Assembly election, died from cancer on 6 August 2007. In the 2005 election his main competitors had been Ram Chandra Ram from the Communist Party of India and Yogendra Nath Baitha from the Rashtriya Janata Dal. The notification for the by-poll was issued on 10 January 2008.

Before the by-election the ruling coalition led by Madhu Koda held 42 out of the 82 seats of the Legislative Assembly; 17 from Jharkhand Mukti Morcha, 9 from the Indian National Congress, 7 from RJD and 9 independents. As United Progressive Alliance partners could not agree of a single candidate, Koda declared himself neutral in the by-election and did not campaign for any candidate.

== Candidates ==
Fifteen nominations were presented for the by-election, but one candidate (Binod Bihari Paswan of UGDP) withdrew from the race. In total 12 men and 2 women stood as candidates. Nine of them stood as independents.

=== Yogendra Nath Baitha ===
The by-election coincided with the lapse of a 60-day deadline that the Indian National Congress had put forth to Koda to comply with a number of demands, and the party threatened to bring down the government if unfulfilled. On 16 January 2008 the Indian National Congress declared that it would contest the by-election on its own.

Yogendra Nath Baitha had won the Simaria seat in the 2000 Bihar Legislative Assembly election. He had served as the Jharkhand State Committee president of RJD. But ahead of the Simaria by-poll, RJD withdrew Baitha as its candidate for the sake of UPA unity. In response Baitha broke with the party and contested the by-poll as an Indian National Congress candidate instead. Baitha presented his nomination papers on 17 January 2008 in the presence of Jharkhand Congress state President Pradeep Kumar Balmuchu. One hypothesis on why Congress decided to break UPA ranks was that it sought to use the by-election to 'test the waters' ahead of the 2009 Legislative Assembly election. Notably, Congress leaders had expressed dissatisfaction with the performance of the Koda cabinet in terms of development and corruption.

Union Ministers Ajay Maken and Subodh Kant Sahay campaigned in favour of Baitha.

=== Anjali Bhogta ===
26-year old Anjali Bhogta contested the election as an independent. A key demand of her campaign was the set-up a NTPC power plant at Tandwa. Her husband had been jailed, accused of belonging to the Tritiya Prastuti Committee (a Naxalite splinter group). Bhogta herself had been a BJP member. Fearing that her candidacy would draw voters from J.P.S. Bhogta, the JVM(P) actively tried to convince her to withdraw her nomination.

=== J.P.S. Bhogta ===
The Jharkhand Vikas Morcha (Prajatantrik) candidate was Jai Prakash Singh Bhogta, a political newcomer in his late 20s. Bhogta is the son of former legislator Mahendra Bhogta. Press reports claimed that JVM(P) would hire two helicopters to help Bhogta campaign across the constituency. Key JVM(P) leaders like Pradeep Yadav, Ravindra Rai, Theodore Kido and Saba Ahmad came to the constituency to campaign for Bhogta.

=== Kumar Ujjwal Das ===
On 16 January 2008 BJP declared that it would field Kumar Ujjwal Das, Upendra Nath Das' son and political newcomer, as its candidate. The party hoped to benefit sympathy wave after the death of Das. He was a 26-year old management graduate of Jadavpur University. Ahead of the election Kumar Ujjwal Das faced opposition from BJP legislator Satyanand Bhogta from the nearby Chatra constituency who wished to field his wife as the BJP candidate instead.

Former Union ministers Yashwant Sinha and Shatrughan Sinha, former Chief Minister Arjun Munda as well as Jharkhand BJP chief P.N. Singh campaigned for Das.

=== Meena Devi ===
The Jharkhand Party candidate Meena Devi was noted for declaring the largest assets, 1,430,000 Indian rupees and two buses.

=== Kuldeep Ganjhu ===
Kuldeep Ganjhu contested the election behind bars as an independent. Once a Communist Party of India (Maoist) zonal commander, Ganjhu had been arrested in 2004. Ganjhu had requested to get a Bahujan Samaj Party ticket to contest the by-election.

=== Ram Chandra Ram ===
CPI candidate Ram Chandra Ram had contested the Simaria seat since 1985. In the by-poll Ram's candidacy was backed-up by RJD, Communist Party of India (Marxist) (CPI(M)) and Jharkhand Mukti Morcha (JMM). CPI Member of Parliament Bhubneshwar Prasad Mehta declared Ram as the joint candidate of the United Progressive Alliance.

JMM declared its support for Ram on 16 January 2008 (after RJD and CPI(M) had already pledged their support), calling for unity of UPA partners to defeat communal forces. However, the Indian National Congress (key constituent of UPA) hesitated to support Ram, seemingly wanting to field a candidate of its own instead. Mehta requested Congress president Sonia Gandhi to withdraw their candidate in favour of Ram.

Seeking to distance itself from the Koda cabinet, CPI requested that neither Koda nor any of his ministers would campaign in favour of Ram. Union Railway Minister and RJD leader Lalu Prasad Yadav campaigned in favour of Ram.

== Security measures ==
The Communist Party of India (Maoist) called for a boycott of the election. All 228 voting stations were declared as sensitive. 20 companies of paramilitary and other security forces were deployed across the constituency to ensure that the election was held. Authorities organized an aerial vigil on polling day. BJP legislator Satyanand Bhogta was put under preventive detention for some time during the election day.

== Voting ==
Voting passed peacefully. Low turn-out was attributed to poll boycott and poor weather.

== Result ==
The counting of votes and declaration of the result was done on 7 February 2008. Ram Chandra Ram was declared as winner. He took his oath a Member of the Legislative Assembly in Ranchi on 8 February 2008.

The result was a set-back for BJP leader Arjun Munda, as it was the fourth consecutive by-election loss for BJP in the state.

Simaria by-election, 2008
Party	Candidate	Votes	%	±%
CPI	Ram Chandra Ram	30,700	26.31%	+3.15%
JVM(P)	Jay Prakash Singh Bhogta	23,092	19.79%	+16.86%'"`UNIQ−−ref−0000000F−QINU`"'
INC	Yogendra Nath Baitha	19,700	16.88%	+12.13%'"`UNIQ−−ref−00000010−QINU`"'
BJP	Kumar Ujjwal Das	18,234	15.63%	−14.56%
Independent	Anjali Bhogta	4,593	3.93%	
Independent	Sunil Kumar Paswan	4,493	3.85%	
Independent	Manoj Rajak	3,350	2.87%	
Jharkhand Party	Meena Devi	2,190	1.87%	
Independent	Kuldeep Ganjhu	2,156	1.84%	
Independent	Ramtahal Turi	2,074	1.77%	−1.98%'"`UNIQ−−ref−00000011−QINU`"'
Independent	Raj Kumar Rajak	1,974	1.69%	+0.8%
Independent	Kailash Bhuiyan	1,564	1.34%	
Independent	Tarkeshwar Ganjhu	1,508	1.29%	
Independent	Gulab Ram	1,032	0.88%	
Majority		7,608	6.52%	
Turnout		116,660	48.0%	+3.29%
CPI gain from BJP		Swing		
