= Kharwar =

Indian community

Regions with significant populations
- India
- Jharkhand: 248,947
- Uttar Pradesh: 160,676
- Bihar: 125,811
- West Bengal: 20,270
- Odisha: 2,265
- Assam: 13,476 (1951 est.)

Languages
- Bhojpuri, Nagpuri

Religion
- Hinduism

Related ethnic groups
- Bhogta

Kharwar is a community found in the Indian states of Uttar Pradesh, Bihar, Jharkhand, Chhattisgarh, Orissa and West Bengal.

== Etymology ==
The Khar grass is totem of the Kharwar. They don't cut or injure it while growing. Kharwar tribe of present-day may be enlarge totem sept which broke off from some larger group and in course of time developed a separate organisation.

== History ==
The Kharwar have various putative origins. Some may be traced to Palamu region, now in the state of Jharkhand, while others may have lived in the Sone Valley. Those of Uttar Pradesh claim to have come from Rohtas and to be descended from the mythological Suryavansha dynasty.

According to an inscription dated 1169 AD found at Phulwari in Rohtas district, which refers to road construction by Nayak Pratapdhavala, the chief of Japila(modern Japla). Pratapdhavala is also known for his inscription of Tarachandi temple in Sasaram and Tutla Bhawani in Tilothu. According to an inscription dated to 1223 AD at Lal Darwaja of Rohtas fort, the descendant and successor of Pratapdhavala was Shri Pratapa. In inscription Shri Pratapa is referred to as belong to Khayaravalavansha or Khayaravala dynasty. Probably Khayaravala survives as modern day Kharwar.

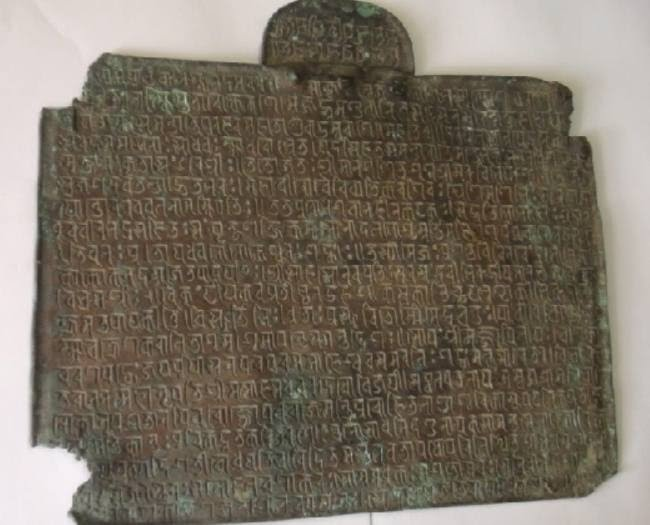
Raja Sahas Dhawal Dev Inscription

== Present circumstances ==
The primary traditional economic activity of the Kharwar has been agriculture but their reliance on a single annual crop and on suitable weather means that it is barely enough to sustain themselves for a part of the year. Thus, they also engage in work based on forest activities, livestock, fishing, hunting and trapping. They have totemic clans such as Kansi (Kans grass), Nilkanth (Indian roller), Hansgadhia, Besra (sparrowhawk), Sahil, Tirkey (eagle), Chandiyar, Lohwar etc. They are patrilinial. Their village chief know as Pradhan. Group of four village called Chatti and its chief known as Chatti Pradhan. Group of five village known as Panchora and chief Panchora Pradhan. Group of seven villages called Satora and its chief known as Satora Pradhan. They employ both Brahmin and Pahan for religious function.

Kharwar speak Sadri, an Indo-Aryan language, at home, and Hindi with others. Kharwar have six endogamous division which are Surajbanshi, Daulat bandi, paraband, Kharia bhogti and Mauijhia. Risley(1891) records Bania, Ba Bahera, Bael(Aegle marmelos), Bair(berry), Bamria, Bandia and few more septs among Kharwar of Chotanagpur. He further reports that in Palamu Kharwar have Pat bandh, Dulbandh and khairi sub tribes where as in southern Lohardaga the community has Deshmari, Kharwar, Bhagta, Rout and Manjhia sub tribes. They consider themselves Kshatriya, often consider themselves Athara Hazari and claim descent from Surajvanshi Rajput.

Birth pollution observed for six days. They cremate or bury the dead and observe death pollution for ten days.

== Official classification ==
The Government of Uttar Pradesh had classified the Kharwar as a Scheduled Caste but the community members disliked this. preferring to think of themselves as a tribe. By 2007, they were one of several groups that the Uttar Pradesh government had redesignated as Scheduled Tribes. As of 2017, this designation applied only in certain districts of the state. The Kharwar Scheduled Caste population in Uttar Pradesh at the 2011 Census of India was 14,796. Kharwar are classified as Scheduled Tribes in Jharkhand.

== Notable people ==
- Lakshman Acharya, Governor of Sikkim
- Nilamber and Pitamber, freedom fighter in the 1857 rebellion
- Chhotelal Kharwar, former M.P from Robertsganj
- Satyanand Bhogta, labour minister of Jharkhand
- Nikki Pradhan, hockey player

== See also ==
- Agori Fort
- Ramgarh Raj
- Kanhachatti
- Singrauli district
- Sidhi district
