= Jalpa =

Jalpa may refer to:

- Jalpa, Jharkhand, a small town and railway station in Jharkhand, India
- Jalpa, Palpa, Nepal
- Jalpa, Tabasco, Mexico
- Jalpa, Zacatecas, Mexico
- Lamborghini Jalpa, a sports car
