= Akbarpur, Rohtas =

Akbarpur
- Village
- Location in Bihar, India
- Coordinates: 24.63509°N 83.96417°E
- Country: India
- State: Bihar
- District: Rohtas

Population (2011)
  - Total: 9,236

Languages
  - Official: Hindi
- Time zone: UTC+5:30 (IST)

Akbarpur is a village in Rohtas block of Rohtas district, Bihar, India. Located on the bank of the Son river, a short distance east of the historic Rohtasgarh fort. In the north of the village stands Murli hill, a small limestone hill about 200 feet high. Akbarpur is the headquarters of Rohtas block. As of 2011, it had a population of 9,236, in 1,491 households. Akbarpur covers 333 hectares and 6.73 km^{2}.

== History ==
A chardiwarrah-style tomb at the foot of the Rohtas plateau was built between 1636 and 1638. The structure consists of a four-walled enclosure containing a raised stone terrace, three prayer niches on the western side, and seven stone sarcophagi on a platform. A Persian inscription over the gate identifies it as the tomb of Malik Wisal, the daroga (superintendent) of Rohtasgarh fort. The tomb was built during the reign of Shah Jahan, at a time when Akhlaskh Khan (or Ikhlās Khān) was the kiladār (commandant) of the fort. The inscription mentions that Akbarpur was one of the parganas that formed the jagir of the commandant. The village has a large Muslim community who are mostly Malik Wishal Khan's descendants and are mostly Niazi and Yusufzai Pathans.

During the Indian Rebellion of 1857, Akbarpur and its surroundings became a centre of the revolt and were for some time controlled by the followers of Kunwar Singh. In October 1858, mutineers from the Ramgarh battalion took up a position in Akbarpur after being defeated at Chatra. They were joined by some of Kunwar Singh's troops but were subsequently attacked by a British force led by Captain Rattray. Rattray's troops, which included Sikhs and sowars (cavalrymen), drove the rebels into the jungles towards Rohtas.

In 1921, Akbarpur had a population of 2,037. At that time, it was the southern terminus of the Dehri-Rohtas Light Railway, and the ruins of an old indigo factory were noted here as well.
