= Kumar Ujjwal =

Indian politician

Member of the Jharkhand Legislative Assembly

Kumar Ujjwal Das (born 1981) is an Indian politician from Jharkhand. He is an MLA from Simaria Assembly constituency, which is reserved for Scheduled Caste community, in Chatra District. He won the 2024 Jharkhand Legislative Assembly election, representing the Bharatiya Janata Party.

== Early life and education ==
Ujjwal is from Hazaribagh, Jharkhand. He is the son of former MLA, Upendranath Das. He completed his M.A. in geography in 2004 at Vinoba Bhave University, Hazaribagh. Earlier, he did his graduation in management at Jadhavpur University.

== Career ==
Ujjwal won from Simaria Assembly constituency representing Bharatiya Janata Party in the 2024 Jharkhand Legislative Assembly election. He polled 1,11,906 votes and defeated his nearest rival, Manoj Kumar Chandra of Jharkhand Mukti Morcha, by a margin of 4,001 votes. He started his political journey in 2008 when BJP fielded him from Simaria seat in the by-election caused by the death of his father Upendranath Das. But Ujjwal could only come third behind winner Ram Chandra Ram of CPI and Jay Prakash Singh Bhogta of Jharkhand Vikas Morcha (Prajatantrik).
