= Siege of Rohtasgarh =

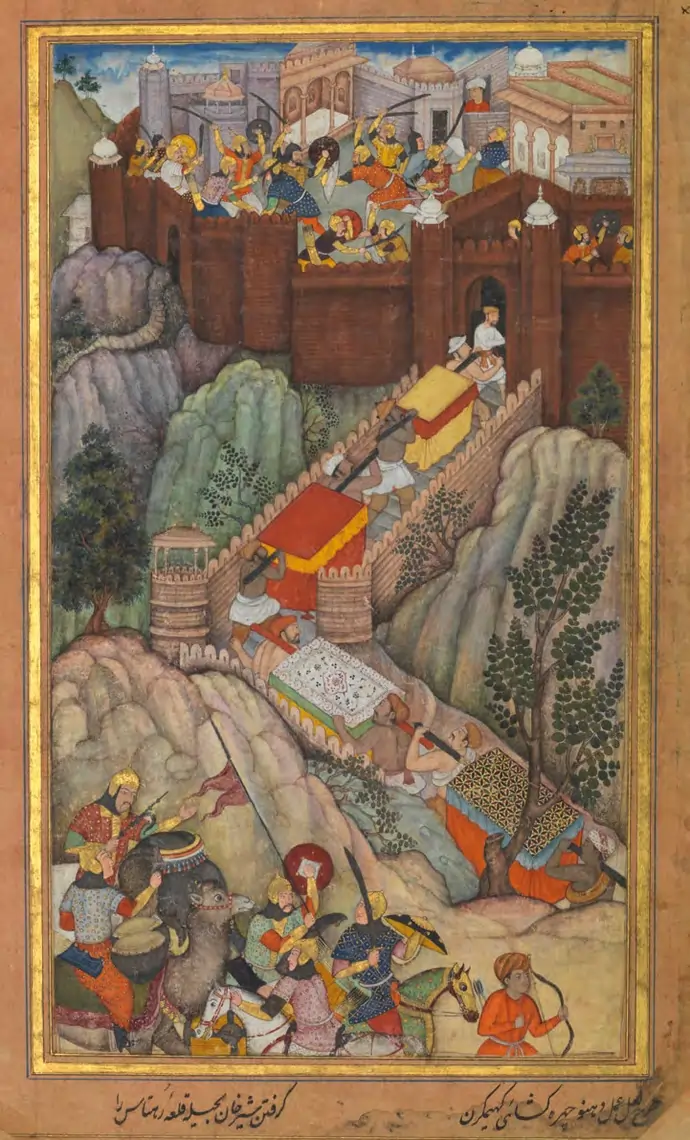
- Illustration of Sher Shah's army storming the fort during the Siege of Rohtasgarh
Date	March 1538
Location	Rohtasgarh, Bihar 24.6233°N 83.9155°E
Result	Suri victory
Territorial changes	Rohtasgarh came under Suri Rule.

Belligerents
Sur Empire	Rajputs

Commanders and leaders
Sher Shah Suri	Hari Krishna (surrendered)

Strength
Unknown	Unknown
- Location within South Asia

== Background ==
Sher Shah prepared for another invasion, and an opportunity came when Mahmud Shah failed to send annual tribute, forcing him to seek refuge in Gaur and frantically ask Humayun for aid. In response, Humayun mobilized a Mughal army in July 1537, and advanced towards Chunar. The Mughals reached the fort in November 1537 and laid siege to it. The siege lasted over six months before the fort finally fell.

== Siege ==
Sher Khan moved to secure the formidable hill fortress of Rohtasgarh in Bihar, seemingly anticipating the emperor's plans against him. The stronghold lay deep in rugged, forested terrain along the upper reaches of the river Son, and local tradition held that it had originally been raised by Rohitashwa, son of the legendary king Harish Chandra. At the time, the fort belonged to a Hindu raja, and Sher Khan had maintained cordial ties with the raja's Brahman advisor, Churaman, hoping the fortress might one day serve as a secure haven for his family and his wealth. Rather than relying on trickery, Sher Khan is said to have moved against the fort directly. He surrounded Rohtasgarh with his Afghan forces, sealing off the hill passes and supply routes so the garrison inside could neither be reinforced nor resupplied. The siege stretched on as his troops probed the defenses, and when the walls finally showed signs of weakening, he ordered a full assault. His soldiers scaled the ramparts and forced their way through the gates under heavy resistance, fighting their way into the fort ward by ward until the raja's garrison was overwhelmed and driven out. With Rohtasgarh now in his hands, Sher Khan made it the secure base he had long sought for his family and his treasure.

== Aftermath ==
He used Rohtasgarh to situate Afghan families and loot he obtained during the war. Following up his victory, Sher Shah besieged Gauda, which fell in April 1538. Split detachments would also be sent to conquer Chittagong. Another force battled against Mahmud Shah led by Khawas Khan Marwat, a general of Sher Shah, which saw Mahmud Shah decisively defeated and mortally wounded. With these victories, Sher Shah held his first coronation. After the fall of Gauda, Sher Shah offered favorable peace terms to Humayun, proposing to pay 1,000,000 dinars, and cede Bihar in exchange for control of Bengal. Humayun refused the offer, not wishing to leave Bengal's rich resources to a hostile state. Additionally, the wounded Mahmud Shah, who had entered Humayun's camp, urged him to continue the war against Sher Shah. Mahmud Shah died from his wounds soon after.

== Sources ==
- Srivastava, Ashirbadi Lal (1964). The Mughal Empire, 1526-1803 A.D. S. L. Agarwala.
- Mehta, J. L. (1984) [1981]. Advanced Study in the History of Medieval India. Sterling Publishers Pvt. Ltd. ISBN 978-81-207-1015-3.
- Chandra, Satish (2007). History of Medieval India: 800-1700. Orient BlackSwan. ISBN 978-81-250-3226-7.
- Jenkins, Everett Jr (2015). The Muslim Diaspora (Volume 2, 1500-1799): A Comprehensive Chronology of the Spread of Islam in Asia, Africa, Europe and the Americas. McFarland. ISBN 978-1-4766-0889-1.
