= List of hills in Bihar =

This is an incomplete list of hills in Bihar. Many of these hills are important historical, archaeological sites, as well as tourist destinations in the state of Bihar in India.

== List ==
Name	Height	District	Made up of	Known for	Picture
Murli Hill	200 feet (61 m)	Rohtas	Limestone	Quarrying ofLimestone	
Gurpa hill	1000 feet (305 m)	Gaya		Buddhist Monastry	Gurpa Hill
Barabar Hill		Jehanabad district		Rock cut caves	Rock cut caves of Barabar
Vulture Peak		Nalanda district		Buddhist Monastry	Gijjhakuta Hill
Mundeshwari Hill	600 ft (200 m)	Kaimur district		Mundeshwari Temple	Temple at the Hill top
Rajgir Hills	1273 ft (308 m)	Nalanda district		Buddhist monasticism	Rajgir hills
