= Tritiya Prastuti Committee =

Indian Maoist group

Tritiya Prastuti Committee (TPC)
- Leader: Brajesh Ganjhu †
- Founded: 2002
- Dates active: 2002 – present
- Split from: Maoist Communist Centre of India
- Country: India
- Active regions: Latehar, Palamu, Chatra
- Ideology: Communism; Marxism–Leninism–Maoism; Naxalism
- Political position: Far-left
- Size: 70 (2007)

The Tritiya Prastuti Committee (TPC) is a splinter group of the Maoist Communist Centre of India. TPC has declared Communist Party of India (Maoist) as its main enemy not police machinery. The area of influence of TPC are in Chatra, Palamu and Latehar district of Jharkhand. TPC is rival of other Maoist outfits.

== Background ==
The Tritiya Prastuti Committee(TPC) was formed in 2002 when several cadres broke away from Maoist Communist Centre (MCC) due to its perceived domination of Yadav caste in decision making and led to the formation of the TPC by non-Yadavs chiefly the Mahtos, Ganjhus, Bhogta, Oraon and Kharwars among others. TPC and CPI (Maoist) are rival and have hunted each other for years.

In 2013, TPC killed several Maoists in an ambush and took 25 maoist as hostage. Many were released to their families by TPC. A report in The Hindu claimed that later TPC cadres handed over the bodies of Maoists to troopers of Commando Battalion for Resolute Action(CoBRA), an elite counter-insurgency wing of the Central Reserve Police Force. TPC and police officials had denied collusion. TPC spokesperson claimed CPI (Maoist) wouldn't be permitted in its territory. The area of influence of TPC is spread over the districts of Latehar, Palamu and Chatra. Five groups, including CPI (Maoist), TPC and People's Liberation Front of India (PLFI) fought for revenue in the territory. Brajesh Ganjhu is Supremo of the TPC. According to 2007 Assessment, there were around 70 cardre of TPC.

== History ==
Since the splint from Communist Party of India (Maoist) due to domination of Yadav caste in decision making in process, It clashed with Communist Party of India and other Maoist organization such as People's Liberation Guerrilla Army (India) and Jharkhand Liberation Tigers (JLT). These groups are engaged in killing of cadres of each other group and fight for supremacy and revenue collection in the region. TPC killed 10 Maoists and took 20 maoist as hostage in March 2013 in Chatra district. This infighting resulted in killing of senior Maoist leader like Lalesh Yadav and Praful. In retaliatory attack CPI(Maoist) killed 16 members of TPC in Vikrampur area of Palamu district in August 2014.

On 4 February 2017, two ex-members of TPC were killed by Maoist in Ranchi. They were released from jail. In February 2017, five suspected members of the TPC were arrested in Ranchi. In February 2019, a TPC rebel who carried reward of 1 lakh surrendered in Ranchi Police Station. In March, 2019 two members of TPC killed in encounter by security forces near Bagodar, Hazaribagh. On 23 June 2021, The area commander of TPC Kishun Ganjhu arrested with one INSAS rifle and 10 Bullets near lawalong. In March 2022, an area commander of TPC, Sakender Yadav who joined TPC in 2014 surrendered with 0.315 bolt action country-made rifles which had 14 rounds cartridge in front of Palamu administration.

== Notable attacks ==
- In March 2013, TPC killed 10 Maoists in an ambush and took 20 maoist as hostage in Chatra district. Revolutionary Democratic Front (RDF) president Varavara Rao and general secretary Rajkishore sought a judicial inquiry into the killing of Maoist cadre.

== Attack by CPI (Maoist) ==
- In August 2014, CPI(Maoist) killed 16 members of TPC in Vikrampur area of Palamu district.
- In April 2016, a squad of 30 Maoist killed a person in marriage ceremony of his daughter in Palamu district claiming him as member of TPC.
- In February 2017, two ex-members of TPC were killed by Maoist in Ranchi who were released from jail.
