= Ganesh Ganjhu =

Indian politician

Member of Jharkhand Legislative Assembly
- In office 2014–2019
- Preceded by: Jay Prakash Singh Bhogta
- Succeeded by: Kishun Kumar Das
- Constituency: Simaria

Personal details
- Born: Lutto, Chatra
- Party: Bharatiya Janata Party
- Parent: Panchu Ganjhu (father)
- Relatives: Brajesh Ganjhu (brother)
- Occupation: Agriculturist, Social worker, Politician
- As of 22 August 2019

Ganesh Ganjhu was the member of Jharkhand Legislative Assembly from Simaria. In the 2014 general election, he was elected as MLA of Simaria as Jharkhand Vikas Morcha (Prajatantrik) candidate. In February 2015, he switched sides and joined the Bharatiya Janata Party with other five MLA's including Randhir Kumar Singh, Amar Kumar Bauri, Janki Prasad Yadav, Alok Kumar Chourasia and Navin Jaiswal from JVM(P).

== Early life and family ==
Ganesh Ganjhu was born in Lutto village of Chatra district. He is son of Panchu Ganjhu. His brother Brajesh Ganjhu is supremo of banned Maoist organisation Tritiya Prastuti Committee(TPC).

== Career ==
He is an agriculturist and a social worker. In 2009 he contested election in the ticket of Jharkhand Vikas Morcha (Prajatantrik), but lost. Then he joined Bharatiya Janata Party but could not get ticket to contest election. Then again in 2014, he joined JVM, contested election from Simaria and won. Then again in 2015, he switched to BJP.
