= Kishun Kumar Das =

Indian politician

Member of Jharkhand Legislative Assembly
- In office 2019–2024
- Preceded by: Ganesh Ganjhu
- Succeeded by: Kumar Ujjwal
- Constituency: Simaria

Personal details
- Political party: Bharatiya Janata Party
- Profession: Politician

Kishun Kumar Das (born 1970) is an Indian politician from Jharkhand. He is an MLA from Simaria Assembly constituency, which is reserved for Scheduled Caste community, in Chatra district. He won the 2019 Jharkhand Legislative Assembly election, representing the Bharatiya Janata Party. He was not given a ticket for the 2024 Assembly election by BJP.

== Early life and education ==
Das is from Simaria, Chatra district, Jharkhand. He is the son of Badhan Ram. He completed his graduation in 1991 at Vananchal College, Tandva. His wife is an anganwadi worker.

== Career ==
Das won from Simaria Assembly constituency representing the Bharatiya Janata Party in the 2019 Jharkhand Legislative Assembly election. He polled 61,438 votes and defeated his nearest rival, Manoj Kumar Chandra of All Jharkhand Students Union, by a margin of 10,996 votes.
