= Yogendra Nath Baitha =

Indian politician

Yogendra Nath Baitha is an Indian politician. He represented the Simaria constituency in the Bihar Legislative Assembly between 2000 and 2005.

In the 1990 Bihar Legislative Assembly election, Baitha stood as a Janata Dal candidate. He finished in fourth place in the race for the Simaria seat with 4,595 votes (7.33%). In the 1995 Bihar Legislative Assembly election he stood in Simaria as a Chotanagapur Santhal Pargana Jan Seva Dal (CSP-JSD) candidate, and although he gained the most votes of any CSP-JSD candidate standing in the election with 12,662 votes (16.01%), he finished in third place. Baitha won the Simaria seat on his third attempt, in the 2000 Bihar Legislative Assembly election. He stood as a Rashtriya Janata Dal (RJD) candidate, obtaining 19,788 votes (41.38%).

On 30 September 2003, Baitha was elected as the president of the Jharkhand State Committee of RJD.

Baitha contested the 2005 Jharkhand Legislative Assembly election, in which he lost the Simaria seat. He finished in third place with 17,859 votes (16.9%). Ahead of the by-election that was being held for the Simaria seat in 2008, RJD withdrew Baitha as their candidate. In response, he contested the election on an Indian National Congress ticket. He finished in third place once again, with 19,700 votes (16.9%).

In 2009, Baitha contested the Simaria seat in the Jharkhand Legislative Assembly election as an Independent. He finished in fifth place with 11,687 votes (8.9%).

Baitha was reported to have joined the Bharatiya Janata Party in 2011.

As of 2014, Baitha was Vice President of the Akhil Bharatiya Dhobi Mahasangh (All India Washermen Federation).
