= Rohtas block =

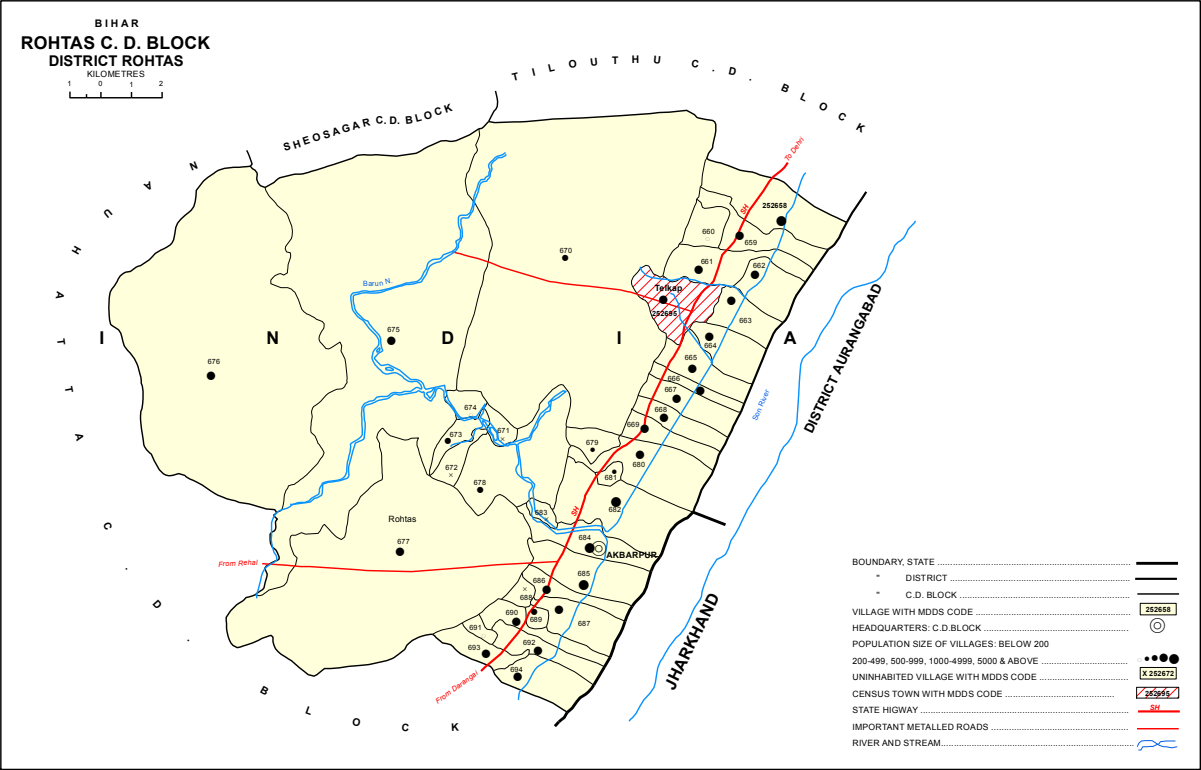
- Map showing divisions of Rohtas block
- Country: India
- State: Bihar
- District: Rohtas
- Headquarters: Akbarpur

Population (2011)
  - Total: 86,049
- Time zone: UTC+05:30 (IST)

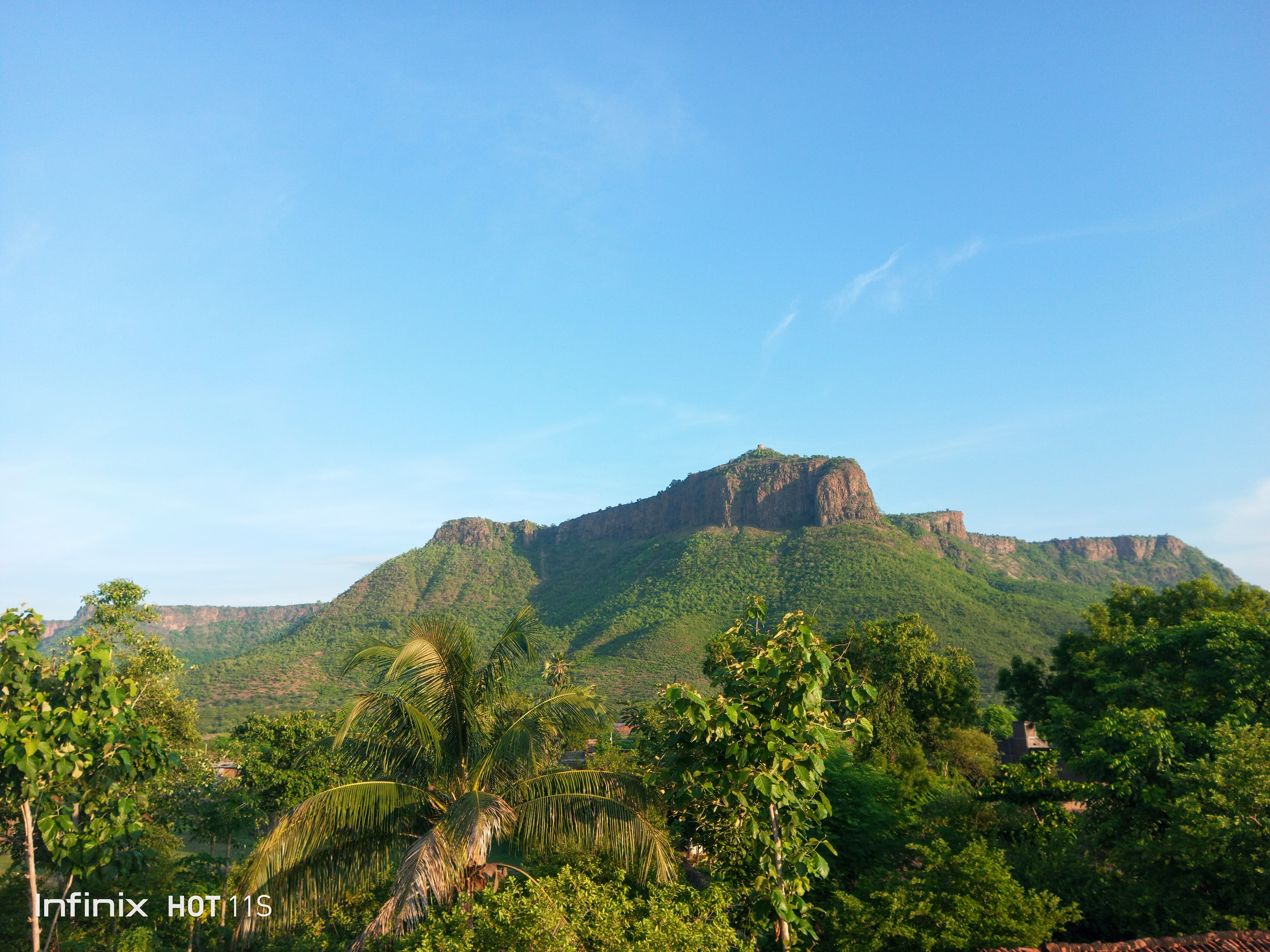
View of Rohtas Plateau from village Kushdihra

Rohtas is a community development block in Rohtas district of Bihar, India. The block headquarters is in the village of Akbarpur, 5 km east of the historic Rohtas Fort. As of 2011, the population of Rohtas block was 86,049.

== History ==
The eponymous fortress of Rohtas was an important centre under Sher Shah Suri and during the Mughal period.

The village of Akbarpur, in the foothills near Rohtasgarh, formed a pargana during the Mughal period. The tomb of Malik Wishal Khan, the daroga of Rohtasgarh under Shah Jahan, is located here.

== Geography ==
Rohtas block is geographically diverse, with parts of it lying on the Sasaram Plain and other parts on the Rohtas Plateau, a hilly outcrop of the Vindhya Range.

== Demographics ==
Historical population
Year	Pop.	±%
2001	78,625	—
2011	86,049	+9.4%
Source: 2011 Census of India

In 2011, the population of Rohtas block was 86,049, of which 4,504 lived in the census town of Telkap and 81,545 in rural areas. The overall sex ratio of the block was 944 females to every 1000 males, which was the highest in the district. The sex ratio was higher in rural areas (947) than in urban areas (904); it was also higher in the 0-6 age group than in the general population. In the 0-6 age group, the sex ratio was 957 (960 in rural areas, and 910 in urban areas), which was the second-highest in the district behind Dawath. (The rural 0-6 sex ratio, however, exceeded Dawath's, making it the highest in the district.)

Members of scheduled castes numbered 15,794 in Rohtas block, representing 18.35% of the population; this proportion was almost identical to the district average of 18.57%. Members of scheduled tribes numbered 6,885, representing 8% of the population, which was much higher than the district average of 1.07%. Additionally, the town of Telkap, in Rohtas block, had the highest proportion of scheduled tribes membership among urban areas in the district of Rohtas (6.86%, compared to the average of 0.75%).

Literacy in Rohtas block was somewhat below the district average: 66.41% of people in the block could read and write, compared with 73.37% in the district as a whole. Literacy was higher in men than in women; 76.24% of men but only 55.96% of women could read and write. The corresponding gender gap in literacy was 20.28%, which was marginally above the district average of 19.91%.

A slight majority of the workforce of Rohtas block was employed in agriculture in 2011, with 12.13% being cultivators who owned or leased their own land and 38.77% being agricultural labourers who worked someone else's land for money. Another 5.77% of the workforce was employed in household industries, and the remaining 43.33% were employed in other forms of work.

== Economy ==
Near the village of Banjari there are significant limestone deposits which are mined for use in the production of cement.

Of the total land area in Rohtas block, 31.57% is cultivable land; of the cultivable land, 54.92% was irrigated in 2011.

== Villages ==
Rohtas block contains 37 villages, of which 33 are inhabited and 4 are uninhabited.

Village name	Total land area (hectares)	Population (in 2011)
Tumba	639.9	6,135
Karma	356.9	2,177
Basarhi	160.6	93
Nawadih	346	4,415
Dhelabar	297.4	2,707
Khajuri	253.7	1,838
Rasulpur	275.6	3,532
Kasiawan	298	4,047
Bazidpur	121	2,689
Banjari	270	2,629
Lebura	220.81	1,797
Kalyanpur	207.85	1,676
Kachhuhar	6,711.3	501
Kaskudar	82.72	0
Amra	121.46	0
Mandha	126.62	520
Amdih	103.53	174
Kauriari	6,235	2,349
Budhua	5,572.32	2,000
Rohtas	4,213.6	2,718
Diadih	916.83	627
Bharuhi	141.8	472
Samahuta	545.56	2,943
Murli Pahari	53.38	250
Baknaur	723.07	7,558
Merara	53.64	0
Akbarpur (capital)	333	9,236
Uchaila	517.93	5,125
Baskatia	178	2,416
Kusdihra	342	2,010
Rajpur	77.97	0
Milki	30.18	858
Jamua	204.84	2,541
Kanakpur	52.73	69
Nawadih	261.11	2,226
Maghigawan	235.64	1,904
Thummha	338.36	1,313
