= People's Liberation Front of India =

Militant Maoist outfit

- Leader: Dinesh Gope (POW)
- Founded: 2007
- Dates active: 2007–present
- Country: India
- Active regions: Gumla, Simdega, Khunti, Ranchi district, Jharkhand
- Ideology: Communism; Marxism–Leninism–Maoism
- Political position: Far-left
- Size: 300

The People's Liberation Front of India (PLFI) is a militant Maoist outfit formed in Jharkhand by Dinesh Gope, a resident of Khunti district. Initially established in 2003 under the name Jharkhand Liberation Tigers (JLT), the group was renamed to PLFI in 2007.

The PLFI is responsible for approximately half of the Maoist-related incidents in Jharkhand. The group is estimated to have between 150 and 300 members. The PLFI has engaged in violent conflicts with the Communist Party of India (Maoist), and members of both factions have been involved in mutual killings. The group has been used by security forces to counter the CPI (Maoist), which has contributed to its rise as a major militant group in the state. In May 2023, Gope was arrested by the National Investigation Agency (NIA) in New Delhi.

== History ==
In 2003, Dinesh Gope, a resident of Lapa Morha Toli in Khunti district, along with others, founded the Jharkhand Liberation Tigers (JLT), a Maoist group aimed at addressing corruption and misgovernance in India. Inspired by leaders such as Subhas Chandra Bose and Bhagat Singh, Gope initially sought to establish the group as an alternative to the Communist Party of India (Maoist), which he felt had failed to fulfill its promises following the Naxalbari uprising. The organization was renamed the People's Liberation Front of India (PLFI) in 2007. Several members of the Communist Party of India (Maoist) joined the PLFI during its formation, but the latter has since distanced itself from the CPI (Maoist). The PLFI is adamant in rejecting associations with the CPI (Maoist) and claims to work within the Indian Constitution to fight corruption and misgovernance. In 2009, four PLFI members, including Jairam Gope, were killed in a clash with the CPI (Maoist) in Gumla district. Although security forces have used the PLFI to counter the CPI (Maoist), this has led to the group being labeled a major militant outfit in Jharkhand. In May 2023, Dinesh Gope was arrested by the NIA in New Delhi.

== Timelines ==
- September 2009: Four PLFI members, including Jairam Gope, were killed in a clash with CPI (Maoist) in Gumla district.
- 2012: PLFI cadres killed Hardeep Singh in Sundergarh district, Odisha, over a dispute regarding extortion.
- March 2014: PLFI cadres killed AJSU leader Tileswar Sahu in Hazaribagh.
- December 2016: Mukesh Yadav, a PLFI member with a ₹2 lakh reward, was arrested.
- January 2017: Jharkhand Police booked Dinesh Gope and seized two plots and a flat in Ranchi.
- June 2018: Ravindra Yadav, a PLFI member, was arrested in Lohardaga.
- 2018: A PLFI sub-zonal commander was arrested for extorting money from a railway contractor in Latehar.
- January 2017: Jharkhand Police booked PLFI zonal commander Jidan Gudia, seizing vehicles, including two tractors and a motorcycle.
- December 2017: PLFI sub-zonal commander Tilkeswar Gope was arrested, and five SUVs and two buses were seized.
- September 2020: Three PLFI members were arrested for demanding a levy from coal exploration officials in Patratu.
- May 2022: PLFI commander Laka Pahan was killed in an encounter with security forces near Murhu Police Station.
- May 2023: Dinesh Gope, the leader of PLFI, was arrested by the NIA in New Delhi.
- December 2024: Two PLFI members were killed by villagers after the group allegedly killed three young villagers the previous month.

== See also ==
- Tritiya Prastuti Committee
