= Dehri Rohtas Light Railway =

Railway line in Bihar, India

Dehri–Rohtas
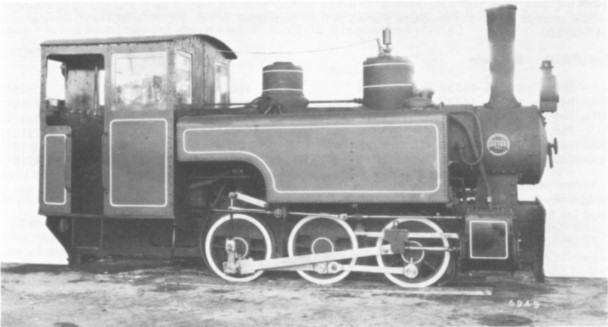
- 0-6-0T Baldwin steam locomotive No 50788 of December 1918. It had 11" x 16" cylinders and 2' 7½" wheels.

Technical
- Line length: 72.6 kilometres (45.1 mi) in Narrow Gauge; 81 kilometres (50 mi) in Broad Gauge for restoration.
- Track gauge: 762 mm (2 ft 6 in)

Dehri Rohtas Light Railway (DRLR) was a 2 ft 6 in (762 mm) narrow gauge railway line between Dehri-On-Sone and Tiura Pipara Dih in the state of Bihar, India.

== History ==
The Dehri Rohtas Light Railway started off as Dehri Rohtas Tramway Company in 1907 promoted by The Octavius Steel and Company of Calcutta. The original contract was to build a 40 km feeder line from Rohtas to the East Indian Railway's Delhi - Calcutta trunk route at Dehri-on-Sone. Soon thereafter, the tramway company was incorporated as a light railway in order to acquire the assets of the then defunct Dwara - Therria Light Railway in Assam. The DRLR opened to traffic in 1911 and was booming by 1913-14 when it carried over 50,000 passengers and 90,000 tons of freight, the goods traffic mainly consisting of marble and stone. In 1927, a 2.5 km spur was added to Rohtasgarh Fort from Rohtas. Rohtas Industries brought the line up to Tiura Pipradih by adding another 25 km to the DRLR, most of which passed through their property.

== Operation ==
At its peak, the DRLR used to operate two daily passengers trains in each direction from Dehri-on-Sone and Tiura Pipradih, a run of 67 km. Apart from this the railway carried marble and stone traffic to the mainline at Dehri on sone.

== Locomotives ==
The DRLR operated a very mixed bag of locomotives. It started off with 0-6-2 tank locomotives, three of which arrived from the Dwara - Therria Railway after it closed in 1909. In the pre IRS years, it also used 0-6-0, 0-4-0 (Sentinel) and 0-6-4 variants of tank locomotives. After the wartime increase in traffic the railway brought as many as eight new ZB class 2-6-2 tender locomotives, orders for which were equally split between Hudswell Clarke and Krauss Maffei. The railway also purchased several locomotives, second hand, notable among which were the A/1 class 2-8-4T locomotives built by Hudswell Clarke that arrived from the Pulgaon - Arvi system of Central Railway in 1959. Other unique locomotives that operated on DRLR were the several ex. Kalka - Simla Railway K class 2-6-2T engines by Kerr Stuart and 2-6-4T engines by Henschel that arrived from the Shahdara–Saharanpur Light Railway.

In 1936, the company owned six locomotives, three railcars, eleven coaches and 132 goods wagons.

== Classification ==
It was labeled as a Class III railway according to Indian Railway Classification System of 1926.

== Closure ==
Due to the decline in the traffic and competition to road in the late 1970s, the DRLR succumbed and closed to traffic on July 16, 1984.

== Restoration plan ==
Restoration of Dehri-Rohtas Light Railway in Broad Gauge from Sasaram Junction to Tiura Pipradih was planned & started in 1999/2000 year. As per new plan, new BG Line was to be 81 kilometres (50 mi) with a 24 kilometres (15 mi) line connecting Deorikalan & Japla through a long 2.7225 kilometres (8,932 ft) Bridge on River Sone. But the project was scrapped due to lack of enthusiasm from Bihar Government post creation of Jharkhand in 2004 year. Pillars of the not constructed Bridge can be still viewed at Deorikalan even today. The restoration project may be started in 2024 as per local demands.
