= Khayaravala dynasty =

- c. 11th-13th century CE
- Status: Vassal state of the Gahadavalas
- Capital: Khayaragarh, Shahabad district
- Government: Monarchy
- Nayak (King or Chief)
- History
  - Established: c. 11th-13th century CE
Preceded by	Succeeded by
Pala Empire	Delhi sultanate
- Today part of: India

The Khayaravala dynasty, was a kingdom that ruled parts of the present-day Indian states of Bihar and Jharkhand, during the 11th and 12th centuries. Their capital was located at Khayaragarh in Shahabad district. The dynasty ruled the Japila territory (now Japla) as feudatories of the Gahadavala dynasty of Varanasi. This is demonstrated by inscriptions which show land grants being made to the Khayaravalas.

== History ==
The Khayaravalas are believed to be from local tradition of the Kharwars states them to have historically been the rulers of Rohtasgarh wherefrom they originally migrated to Palamu. Pratapadhavala is considered to have been the first powerful ruler of this dynasty when he came into power in the middle of the 12th century. He left rock inscriptions throughout his reign in the Sanskrit language. An inscription from Pratapadhavala dated to 1158 and found on a rock-cut image of Durga near Tilouthu states that he travelled on a pilgrimage accompanied by five female slaves, a doorkeeper, a court pandit and his household.

There are remains of archaeological find-spots in the area previously controlled by the dynasty. These find-spots include inscriptions of King Pratapdhavala in Phulwaria, the Tutrahi fall rock inscription of Vikram Samvat 1214, Tarachandi rock inscription of Pratapdhavala of Vikram Samvat 1225, Copperplate inscription of Udayaraja and Indradhavala of Vikram Samvat 1254 and Rohtas inscription of Shri Pratapa of Vikram Samvat 1279.

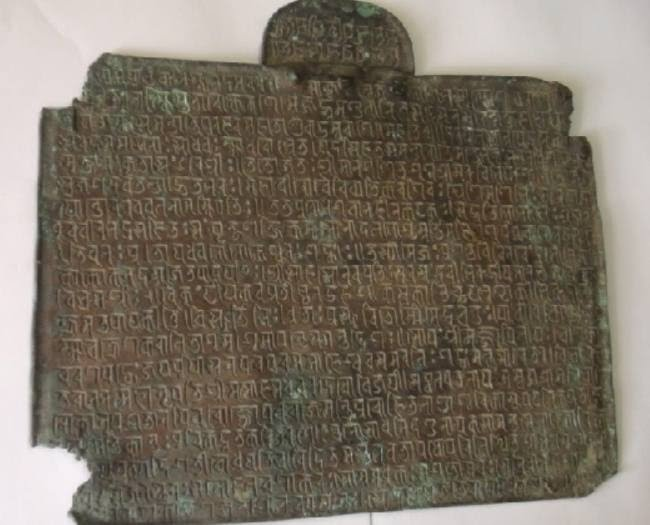
Raja Sahas Dhawal Dev Inscription

== Ruler ==
The known rulers of the Khayaravala dynasty are as follows:

- Pratap Dhavala
- Udayaraja
- Indradhavala
- Shri Pratapa
