= Bhogta =

Agricultural community in India

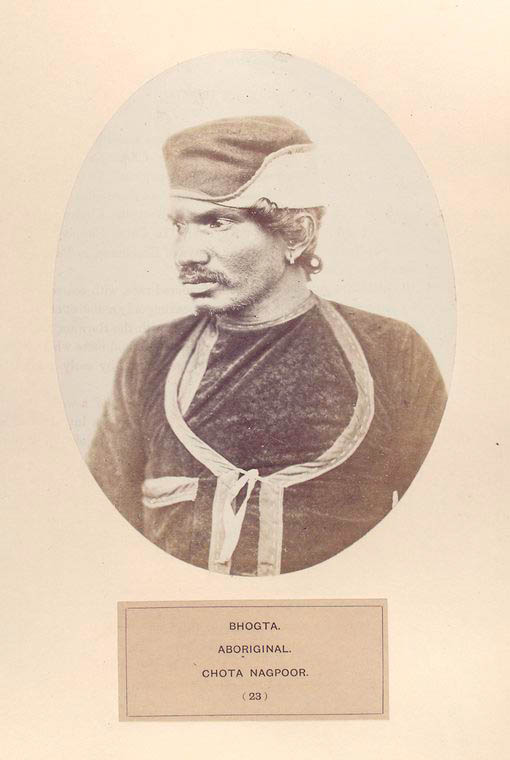
- Late 18th century photographs of Bhogta man
- (2011, census)

Regions with significant populations
- India
- Jharkhand: 223,453
- West Bengal: 18,269
- Bihar: 15,103
- Assam: 12,058 (1951 est.)

Languages
- Sadri • Hindi • Regional languages

Religion
- Hinduism • Tribal religion

Related ethnic groups
- Kharwar

The Bhogta (also known as Ganjhu, Pradhan) is an agricultural community, primarily inhabiting the states of Bihar, Jharkhand and West Bengal. They speak Sadri language as mother tongue except Bhogta of West Bengal, who are adopted Sadri as mother tongue and use Hindi Language

- Jainath Singh Bhogta was a prominent tribal leader in Jharkhand's history. He ledthe Bhogta Rebellion (1770-1771 AD) against the British.
- Nilamber and Pitamber Bhogta were tribal brothers and freedom fighters from Jharkhand, eastern India, who led a revolt against the East India Company during the Indian Rebellion of 1857.

as link language.[5]

== Social structure ==
The Bhogta are traditionally cultivators and Hindu by religion. The Bhogta of Bihar divided into eight clan, i.e. Damajhwar, Saichumair (Saichuniar), Bhumchuriar (Bhumchuniar), Rimrimria, Pathbhandhi, Musuar, Kmariar (Kawliar), Beharwar and the Bhogta of West Bengal divided into Hans, Mur, Kaua, etc. They use surname like Bhogta, Ganjhu and Singh.

== Official classification ==
As per 1981 census the Bhogta population in Bihar (include Jharkhand) was 137,175 and as per 1952 census their population was 13,807 in West Bengal. They were previously classified as Scheduled Castes for affirmative action. But in 2022, the Bhogta of Jharkhand state are classified as a Scheduled Tribe, as a synonym of Kharwar. In Odisha, they lives in neighbouring districts of Jharkhand such as Sundargarh, and Sambalpur. They are notified as Other Backward Classes since 1994.

== Notable people ==
- Nilamber and Pitamber, freedom fighter in 1857
- Jay Prakash Singh Bhogta, politician
- Mahendra Prakash Singh Bhogta, politician
- Satyanand Bhogta, politician
- Nikki Pradhan, hockey player
