= Janardan Paswan =

Indian politician

Member of the Jharkhand Legislative Assembly
- Incumbent
- Assumed office 23 November 2024
- Preceded by: Satyanand Bhogta
- Constituency: Chatra
- In office 23 December 2009 – 23 December 2014
- Preceded by: Satyanand Bhogta
- Succeeded by: Jay Prakash Singh Bhogta
- Constituency: Chatra
- In office 1995–2000
- Preceded by: Mahendra Prakash Singh Bhogta
- Succeeded by: Satyanand Bhogta
- Constituency: Chatra

Personal details
- Party: LJP(RV)
- Occupation: Politician
- As of 21 November 2019

Janardan Paswan is an Indian politician and three-time elected member from Chatra Vidhan Sabha constituency to Bihar and Jharkhand assembly. First he was elected in year 1995 on the ticket of Janta Dal for Bihar legislative assembly. After the partition of state of Bihar into two states Bihar and Jharkhand on 14 November 2000, BJP won the Chatra seat twice. Then again in year 2024 assembly election Janardan Paswan got the mandate of people of Chatra on the ticket of LJP(RV), and serves his third tenure as MLA in Jharkhand legislative assembly.Then again in year 2009 assembly election Janardan Paswan got the mandate of people of Chatra on the ticket of RJD, and served his second tenure as MLA in Jharkhand legislative assembly.

He was born in the Partapur village and completed his schooling from Partapur school. He is a graduate in Sanskrit from KS Sanskrit University, Darbhanga.

He was a prominent face of Rashtriya Janata Dal in Jharkhand state and best known for his good and close relation with RJD supremo Lalu Prasad Yadav.

Before 2019 Jharkhand assembly election he left RJD and joined BJP. He contested 2019 assembly election from Chatra Vishan Sabha seat on the ticket of Bharatiya Janata Party.

In 2024 Assembly elections, he contested on a LJP(RV) ticket and won.
