= Murli Hill, Rohtas =

Hill station in India

Murli Hill is a small hill in India, situated in the north of the Akbarpur village in the Rohtas district of Bihar. It stands at a height of 200 feet and is composed of limestone in thin strata.

== History ==
The administration and ownership of the Hill have a history dating back to the British Raj. In 1764, after the Battle of Buxar, the Rohtas pargana, which had the Kaimur range and Murli Hill, was handed over to the East India Company. A significant portion was subsequently granted back to the former Diwan of Rohtas Fort, Raja Shah Mal, as a reward. Rai Harbans Rai, who was Raja Shah Mal's successor, imposed duties known Banskati on forest produce taken from the pargana. Around 1812, his representatives surrendered the grant back to the Company, which then retained the right to levy these duties. This right became known as the Banskati Mahal and was eventually administered directly by government officers after 1885.

The government permanently settled much of the surrendered territory. Mahal Chandanpura, which included the villages of Baknaur and Samahuta on Lower Murli Hill, was settled in favour of Rani Gulab Kunvar. This grant did not include Upper Murli Hill, which remained government property. The right of the Zamindar of Chandanpura later became vested in the State of Bihar under the Bihar Land Reforms Act of 1950.

=== Economic history ===
The area around the Hill has been associated with quarrying operations by companies such as Rohtas Quarries Ltd. and Dalmia Jain and Co. Ltd. A railway siding, known as the Murli siding, was located on the hill as part of the Dehri Rohtas Light Railway. In the duration of 1910-12, a land acquisition of 1.683 acres was done on lower Murli Hill for the purpose of realigning this siding in the village of Sambauta.

== Geography and land division ==
The Hill has two sections:

- Upper Murli Hill: This covers an area of 137 acres. It is situated in pargana Rohtas, Tahsil Circle Sasaram.
- Lower Murli Hill: This comprises an area of 250 bighas within the Banskati Mahal, also in pargana Rohtas. The plots identified in records are plot No. 168 in Baknaur, and plots Nos. 42, 44, 128, and 130 in Samahuta.

== Legal disputes over customary rights ==
The main legal conflict regarding the Hill was the case of the State of Bihar v. Subodh Gopal Bose, which was decided by the Supreme Court of India in 1967. Details of the case are as follow:

- The plaintiff, Subodh Gopal Bose, claimed a right to quarry limestone for trade purposes based on an immemorial custom and usage for tenants within the Banskati Mahal. This claim was supported by entries in Custom-Sheets made during the Cadastral Survey completed of 1913. These records noted that residents could take stone for personal use without charge but had to pay fees to prepare and sell lime.
- The Verdict: The Supreme Court held that the practices recorded in the Custom-Sheets did not establish an absolute right. The need to pay fees for commercial purpose indicated that the privilege was permissive, not a customary right. The Court ruled that a tradition allowing an indeterminate number of tenants to quarry for trade purposes would be legally unreasonable as it could lead to the complete destruction of the resource.

Outcome: The court declared that the plaintiff had no customary right to excavate limestone for trading from Lower Murli Hill. However, it upheld the plaintiff's right to possession of the specific plots for which he held tenancy rights from the Zamindar (excluding the land acquired for the railway), so long as those rights were not lawfully terminated.
