= Mahendra Prakash Singh Bhogta =

Indian politician

Member of State Legislative Assembly
- In office 1990–1995
- Succeeded by: Janardan Paswan
- Constituency: Chatra
- In office 1985–1990
- Preceded by: Mahesh Ram

Personal details
- Born: Chatra, Bihar (now Jharkhand)
- Died: 1997 Chatra, Bihar (now Jharkhand)
- Party: Bharatiya Janata Party
- Children: Jay Prakash Singh Bhogta (son)
- Occupation: Politician
- As of 2 November 2019

Mahendra Prakash Singh Bhogta was twice the state legislative assembly member from Chatra from 1985 to 1995. He was a member of the Bharatiya Janata Party.

He was from Bhogta community. Later his son Jay Prakash Singh Bhogta became MLA. He died due to heart attack in 1997 by witnessing 10 dead Maoists of Communist Party of India (Marxist–Leninist) killed by Maoist of Maoist Communist Centre of India.
