= Jalpa, Palpa =

Jalpa जल्पा
- Village development committee
- Location in Nepal
- Coordinates: 27.79°N 83.75°E
- Country: Nepal
- Zone: Lumbini Zone
- District: Palpa District

Government
  - Type: federal democracy

Population (1991)
  - Total: 3,115
- Time zone: UTC+5:45 (Nepal Time)

Jalpa is a village development committee in Palpa District in the Lumbini Zone of southern Nepal. During the 1991 Nepal census it had a population of 3115 people living in 514 individual households.
