= Pratap Dhavala =

- Nayak
- Successor: Shri Pratapa
- Dynasty: Khayaravala
- Religion: Hinduism

Pratap Dhavala was Khayaravala king in 12th century. There are inscription of Pratapdhavala in Phulwaria, Tutrahi fall rock inscription of Vikram Samvat 1214, Tarachandi rock inscription of Vikram Samvat 1225.
