= Deorikalan =

- Village
- Location in Jharkhand, India Deorikalan (India)
- Coordinates: 24.55275°N 83.96127°E
- Country: India
- State: Jharkhand
- District: Palamu

Population (2001)
  - Total: 3,929

Languages
  - Official: Hindi, Santali
- Time zone: UTC+5:30 (IST)
- Vehicle registration: JH
- Website: palamu.nic.in

Deorikalan is a census town in Palamu district in the state of Jharkhand, India.

== Demographics ==
As of 2001 India census, Deorikalan had a population of 3,929. Males constitute 52% of the population and females 48%. Deorikalan has an average literacy rate of 54%, lower than the national average of 59.5%: male literacy is 65% and, female literacy is 41%. In Deorikalan, 17% of the population is under 6 years of age.
