= Shri Pratapa =

- Nayak
- Predecessor: Pratapdhavala
- Dynasty: Khayaravala
- Religion: Hinduism

Shri Pratapa was Khayaravala king in 13th century. There are inscription of Shri Pratapa in Rohtas of Vikram Samvat 1279. According to inscription he defeated a "Yavana" army; the "Yavana" here probably refers to a Muslim general. According to the inscription of Rohtas Fort, Shri Pratapa was descendant and successor of Pratapdhavala.
