= Upendra Nath Das =

Indian politician

- उपेन्द्र नाथ दास

Member of the Simaria Legislative Assembly
- Constituency: Simaria Assembly constituency

Personal details
- Died: 13 August 2007
- Party: Janata Party
- Other political affiliations: Bharatiya Janata Party
- Children: Kumar Ujjwal Das

Upendra Nath Das (Hindi: उपेन्द्र नाथ दास; died 13 August 2007) was an Indian politician, affiliated with the Bharatiya Janata Party.

Das won the Simaria Legislative Assembly seat in the 1977 Bihar Legislative Assembly election. Das was merely 25 years old at the time. He stood as a Janata Party candidate. Das obtained 17,865 votes (54.84% of the votes).

Das lost the Simaria seat in the 1980 Bihar Legislative Assembly election, standing as a BJP candidate. He finished in second place with 8,664 votes (25.93%). He finished in second place again in the 1985 Bihar Legislative Assembly election, obtaining 12,573 votes (29.78%).

Das regained the Simaria seat in the 1990 Bihar Legislative Assembly election. He obtained 30,801 votes (49.14%). He managed to retain the seat in the 1995 Bihar Legislative Assembly election, but with reduced margins. He obtained 21,405 votes (27.06%).

He lost the seat in the 2000 Bihar Legislative Assembly election, finishing in second place with 14,239 votes (29.77%). However, he managed to regain the Simaria seat in the 2005 Jharkhand Legislative Assembly election (Jharkhand had been carved out of Bihar, and Simaria was now part of the new state). He obtained 31,858 votes (30.2%). He served as Parliamentary Secretary of the Jharkhand Legislative Assembly between 30 July 2005 and 17 September 2006.

Das died at the age of 56 at the Rajendra Institute of Medical Sciences in Ranchi. He had suffered from cancer for a long time. Following his death a by-election was held for the Simaria seat. His son, Kumar Ujjwal Das, contested the election but lost.
