= Chatra Assembly constituency =

Constituency of the Jharkhand legislative assembly in India

Coordinates: 24.207°N 84.869°E

Chatra
- Constituency No. 27 for the Jharkhand Legislative Assembly

Constituency details
- Country: India
- Region: East India
- State: Jharkhand
- District: Chatra
- Lok Sabha constituency: Chatra
- Established: 2000
- Total electors: 372,980
- Reservation: SC

Member of Legislative Assembly
- 5th Jharkhand Legislative Assembly
- Incumbent Janardan Paswan
- Party: LJP(RV)
- Alliance: NDA
- Elected year: 2024

Chatra Assembly constituency is an assembly constituency in the Indian state of Jharkhand.

== Members of the Legislative Assembly ==
Election	Member	Party
Bihar Legislative Assembly
1952	Sukhlal Singh	Indian National Congress
1957	Kamakhya Narain Singh	Chota Nagpur Santhal Parganas Janata Party
1962	Keshav Prasad Singh	Swatantra Party
1967	Keshav Prasad Singh	Independent politician
1969	Kamakhya Narain Singh	Janata Party
1972	Tapeshwar Deo	Indian National Congress
1977	S. Ahmad Sabr	Janata Party
1980	Mahesh Ram	Indian National Congress
1985	Mahendra Prakash Singh Bhogta	Bharatiya Janata Party
1990	Mahendra Prakash Singh Bhogta	Bharatiya Janata Party
1995	Janardan Paswan	Janata Dal
2000	Satyanand Bhogta	Bharatiya Janata Party
Jharkhand Legislative Assembly
2005	Satyanand Bhogta	Bharatiya Janata Party
2009	Janardan Paswan	Rashtriya Janata Dal
2014	Jay Prakash Singh Bhogta	Bharatiya Janata Party
2019	Satyanand Bhogta	Rashtriya Janata Dal
2024	Janardan Paswan	Lok Janshakti Party (Ram Vilas)

== Election results ==
=== Assembly election 2024 ===
2024 Jharkhand Legislative Assembly election: Chatra
Party	Candidate	Votes	%	±%
LJP(RV)	Janardan Paswan	109,019	40.58	New
RJD	Rashmi Prakash	90,618	33.73	▼12.68
JLKM	Ashok Bharti	16,776	6.24	New
Independent	Umesh Kumar Bharti	14,190	5.28	New
CPI	Doman Bhuiyan	6,112	2.28	New
Independent	Ashok Kumar Gahlot	5,714	2.13	New
AIMIM	Subodh Paswan	5,535	2.06	New
NOTA	None of the Above	8,071	3.00	▲0.10
Margin of victory		18,401	6.85	▼4.13
Turnout		2,68,657	62.81	▲4.06
Registered electors		4,27,699		▲14.67
LJP(RV) gain from RJD		Swing	▼5.83	

=== Assembly election 2019 ===
2019 Jharkhand Legislative Assembly election: Chatra
Party	Candidate	Votes	%	±%
RJD	Satyanand Bhogta	101,710	46.41	▲25.90
BJP	Janardan Paswan	77,655	35.44	▼2.90
JD(U)	Kedar Bhuiyan	7,292	3.33	New
JVM(P)	Tileshwar Ram	6,703	3.06	▼23.97
BSP	Goutam Ravidas	4,645	2.12	New
CPI(M)	Naresh Ram Bharti	4,076	1.86	▼2.01
Nagrik Adhikar Party	Kauleshwar Kumar Bhokta	3,654	1.67	New
NOTA	None of the Above	6,357	2.90	▼1.35
Margin of victory		24,055	10.98	▼0.33
Turnout		2,19,137	58.75	▲5.13
Registered electors		3,72,980		▲9.94
RJD gain from BJP		Swing	▲8.07	

=== Assembly election 2014 ===
2014 Jharkhand Legislative Assembly election: Chatra
Party	Candidate	Votes	%	±%
BJP	Jay Prakash Singh Bhogta	69,745	38.34	▲16.50
JVM(P)	Satyanand Bhogta	49,169	27.03	New
RJD	Janardan Paswan	37,320	20.52	▼30.47
CPI(M)	Naresh Ram Bharti	7,041	3.87	New
Communist Party of India (Marxist Leninist) Liberation	Umesh Bhuiyan	4,192	2.30	New
ABHM	Sagar Ram	3,672	2.02	New
JMM	Manorma Devi	3,041	1.67	▼0.02
NOTA	None of the Above	7,724	4.25	New
Margin of victory		20,576	11.31	▼17.84
Turnout		1,81,904	53.62	▲4.01
Registered electors		3,39,245		▲27.25
BJP gain from RJD		Swing	▼12.65	

=== Assembly election 2009 ===
2009 Jharkhand Legislative Assembly election: Chatra
Party	Candidate	Votes	%	±%
RJD	Janardan Paswan	67,441	50.99	▲15.24
BJP	Subedar Paswan	28,886	21.84	▼17.58
INC	Sahindra Ram	18,883	14.28	▲10.04
BSP	Krishna Bhuiyan	4,219	3.19	▼0.43
Independent	Sagar Ram	3,347	2.53	New
Independent	Mithlesh Kumar	2,943	2.23	New
JMM	Suresh Das	2,239	1.69	New
Margin of victory		38,555	29.15	▲25.48
Turnout		1,32,264	49.61	▲0.28
Registered electors		2,66,597		▲3.00
RJD gain from BJP		Swing	▲11.57	

=== Assembly election 2005 ===
2005 Jharkhand Legislative Assembly election: Chatra
Party	Candidate	Votes	%	±%
BJP	Satyanand Bhogta	50,332	39.42	▼5.76
RJD	Janardan Paswan	45,650	35.75	▼0.84
INC	Sanjay Lal Paswan	5,412	4.24	▼8.70
BSP	Chhunnu Ram	4,623	3.62	▲3.01
LJP	Umesh Singh Bhogta	4,571	3.58	New
CPI(M)	Sanjay Kumar Paswan	3,619	2.83	New
Independent	Kailash Bhuiyan	3,421	2.68	New
Margin of victory		4,682	3.67	▼4.92
Turnout		1,27,685	49.33	▲12.87
Registered electors		2,58,832		▲24.77
BJP hold		Swing	▼5.76	

=== Assembly election 2000 ===
2000 Bihar Legislative Assembly election: Chatra
Party	Candidate	Votes	%	±%
BJP	Satyanand Bhogta	34,177	45.18	New
RJD	Janardan Paswan	27,682	36.59	New
INC	Badri Ram	9,791	12.94	New
Independent	Vinesh Das	2,942	3.89	New
Independent	Bhim Choudhary	588	0.78	New
BSP	Vinay Paswan	465	0.61	New
Margin of victory		6,495	8.59	
Turnout		75,645	37.37	
Registered electors		2,07,453		
BJP win (new seat)				

== See also ==
- Vidhan Sabha
- List of states of India by type of legislature
