= Jay Prakash Singh Bhogta =

Indian politician

Member of Jharkhand Legislative Assembly
- In office 2014–2019
- Preceded by: Janardan Paswan
- Succeeded by: Satyanand Bhogta
- Constituency: Chatra

Member of the State Legislative Assembly
- In office 2009–2014
- Preceded by: Ram Chandra Ram
- Succeeded by: Ganesh Ganjhu
- Constituency: Simaria

Personal details
- Party: Jharkhand Vikas Morcha (Prajatantrik)(2009−2014); Bharatiya Janata Party (2014- present)
- Parent: Mahendra Prakash Singh Bhogta (father)
- Occupation: Politician
- As of 5 April 2019

Jay Prakash Singh Bhogta was the state legislative assembly member from Chatra. He is a member of the Bharatiya Janata Party. In the 2014 general election, he was elected as MLA of Chatra. His father Mahendra Prakash Singh Bhogta was MLA of Chatra. His father Mahendra Prakash Singh Bhogta was former MLA from Chatra.
