= Simaria Assembly constituency =

Assembly constituency in Jharkhand

Coordinates: 24.052°N 84.933°E

Simaria
- Constituency No. 26 for the Jharkhand Legislative Assembly

Constituency details
- Country: India
- Region: East India
- State: Jharkhand
- District: Chatra
- Lok Sabha constituency: Chatra
- Established: 1977
- Total electors: 329,361
- Reservation: SC

Member of Legislative Assembly
- 5th Jharkhand Legislative Assembly
- Incumbent Kumar Ujjwal
- Party: BJP
- Elected year: 2024

Simaria Assembly constituency is an assembly constituency in the Indian state of Jharkhand. The seat was created ahead of the 1977 Bihar Legislative Assembly election, being carved out of the Hazaribagh seat. Simaria is located in the Chatra Lok Sabha constituency.

== Members of the Legislative Assembly ==
Election	Member	Party
Bihar Legislative Assembly
Before 1977: Constituency did not exist
1977	Upendra Nath Das	Janata Party
1980	Ishwari Ram Paswan	Indian National Congress
1985	Ishwari Ram Paswan	Indian National Congress
1990	Upendra Nath Das	Bharatiya Janata Party
1995	Upendra Nath Das	Bharatiya Janata Party
2000	Yogendra Nath Baitha	Rashtriya Janata Dal
Jharkhand Legislative Assembly
2005	Upendra Nath Das	Bharatiya Janata Party
2009	Jay Prakash Singh Bhogta	Jharkhand Vikas Morcha
2014	Ganesh Ganjhu	Jharkhand Vikas Morcha
2019	Kishun Kumar Das	Bharatiya Janata Party
2024	Kumar Ujjwal	Bharatiya Janata Party

=== Assembly election 2024 ===
2024 Jharkhand Legislative Assembly election: Simaria
Party	Candidate	Votes	%	±%
BJP	Kumar Ujjwal	111,906	44.47%	▲14.22
JMM	Manoj Kumar Chandra	1,07,905	42.88%	New
JLKM	Jitendra Kumar	11,164	4.44%	New
CPI	Suresh Kumar	3,809	1.51%	New
Independent	Sadanand Bhuiyan	3,598	1.43%	New
BSP	Ramwtar Ram	2,265	0.90%	New
NOTA	None of the Above	6,928	2.75%	▲1.94
Margin of victory		4,001	1.59%	▼3.82
Turnout		2,51,640	66.67%	▲5.00
Registered electors		3,77,446		▲14.60
BJP hold		Swing	▲14.22	

=== Assembly election 2019 ===
2019 Jharkhand Legislative Assembly election: Simaria
Party	Candidate	Votes	%	±%
BJP	Kishun Kumar Das	61,438	30.25%	▲2.22
AJSU	Manoj Kumar Chandra	50,442	24.84%	New
JVM(P)	Ramadev Singh Bhogta	31,346	15.43%	▼21.06
INC	Yogendra Nath Baitha	27,665	13.62%	New
Independent	Niraj Kumar Niraj	5,552	2.73%	New
Independent	Kamlesh Kumar	4,366	2.15%	New
Jharkhand Party	Anand Kumar Bharti	3,579	1.76%	New
NOTA	None of the Above	1,644	0.81%	▼3.32
Margin of victory		10,996	5.41%	▼3.05
Turnout		2,03,104	61.67%	▲0.01
Registered electors		3,29,361		▲9.96
BJP gain from JVM(P)		Swing	▼6.25	

=== Assembly election 2014 ===
2014 Jharkhand Legislative Assembly election: Simaria
Party	Candidate	Votes	%	±%
JVM(P)	Ganesh Ganjhu	67,404	36.50%	▲10.67
BJP	Sujeet Kumar Bharati	51,764	28.03%	▲8.58
RJD	Manoj Kumar Chandra	26,560	14.38%	New
JMM	Rajkumari Devi	6,671	3.61%	▼16.12
CPI	Binod Bihari Paswan	6,636	3.59%	▼10.03
Jharkhand Vikas Dal	Sadanand Bhuiyan	4,629	2.51%	New
Independent	Sahdeo Ram	2,466	1.34%	New
NOTA	None of the Above	7,619	4.13%	New
Margin of victory		15,640	8.47%	▲2.37
Turnout		1,84,693	61.66%	▲7.91
Registered electors		2,99,532		▲22.26
JVM(P) hold		Swing	▲10.67	

=== Assembly election 2009 ===
2009 Jharkhand Legislative Assembly election: Simaria
Party	Candidate	Votes	%	±%
JVM(P)	Jay Prakash Singh Bhogta	34,007	25.82%	New
JMM	Ganesh Ganjhu	25,982	19.73%	▲15.98
BJP	Satyanand Bhogta	25,613	19.45%	▼10.74
CPI	Manoj Kumar Chandra	17,938	13.62%	▼9.54
Independent	Yogendra Nath Baitha	11,687	8.88%	New
Independent	Shanker Rajak	4,378	3.32%	New
AJSU	Kuldeep Ganjhu	2,940	2.23%	New
Margin of victory		8,025	6.09%	▼0.94
Turnout		1,31,684	53.75%	▲9.03
Registered electors		2,45,001		▲3.82
JVM(P) gain from BJP		Swing	▼4.37	

=== Assembly election 2005 ===
2005 Jharkhand Legislative Assembly election: Simaria
Party	Candidate	Votes	%	±%
BJP	Upendra Nath Das	31,858	30.19%	▲0.42
CPI	Ram Chandra Ram	24,438	23.16%	▼0.95
RJD	Yogendra Nath Baitha	17,859	16.92%	▼24.45
BSP	Dineshwar Ram	7,769	7.36%	New
INC	Ishwari Ram Paswan	5,010	4.75%	▲0.53
JMM	Ramtahal Turi	3,953	3.75%	New
Independent	Alias Jai Prakash Singh Bhogta	3,086	2.92%	New
Margin of victory		7,420	7.03%	▼4.57
Turnout		1,05,525	44.71%	▲18.67
Registered electors		2,35,995		▲28.52
BJP gain from RJD		Swing	▼11.19	

=== Assembly election 2000 ===
2000 Bihar Legislative Assembly election: Simaria
Party	Candidate	Votes	%	±%
RJD	Yogendra Nath Baitha	19,788	41.38%	New
BJP	Upendra Nath Das	14,239	29.77%	New
CPI	Ram Chandra Ram	11,532	24.11%	New
INC	Dr. Nand Kishor Prasad	2,018	4.22%	New
Margin of victory		5,549	11.60%	
Turnout		47,824	26.55%	
Registered electors		1,83,625		
RJD win (new seat)				

== See also ==
- Vidhan Sabha
- List of states of India by type of legislature
