= Satyanand Bhogta =

Indian politician

Cabinet Minister Government of Jharkhand
- In office 29 December 2019 – 26 November 2024
- Governor: Draupadi Murmu; Ramesh Bais; C. P. Radhakrishnan
- Chief Minister: Hemant Soren
- Department: Labour.; Employment & Training.
- Preceded by: Raj Paliwar
- Succeeded by: Sanjay Prasad Yadav

Member of Jharkhand Legislative Assembly
- In office 2019–2024
- Preceded by: Jay Prakash Singh Bhogta
- Succeeded by: Janardan Paswan
- Constituency: Chatra
- In office 2000–2009
- Preceded by: Janardan Paswan
- Succeeded by: Janardan Paswan
- Constituency: Chatra

Personal details
- Party: Rashtriya Janata Dal (2019- present)
- Other political affiliations: Bharatiya Janata Party (2000−2014); Jharkhand Vikas Morcha (Prajatantrik)(2014-2019)
- Occupation: Politician
- As of 21 November, 2019

Satyanand Bhogta is an Indian Politician and a member of the Rashtriya Janata Dal political party. He is the ex cabinet minister for ministry of Labour Resources in Government of Jharkhand and a member of Jharkhand Legislative Assembly from Chatra constituency.

== Career ==
He was twice the member of state legislative assembly from Chatra from 2000 to 2009. He was state Drinking water, Sanitation and agriculture minister.

In 2014, he joined Jharkhand Vikas Morcha (Prajatantrik) after BJP denied ticket to him from Chatra. In Jharkhand Legislative Assembly election 2019, Satyanand Bhogta was elected as M.L.A. of Chatra as RJD candidate.

=== Views ===
In 2022, he showed his displeasure over the removal of the Bhogta caste from having official Scheduled Caste status, instead having Scheduled Tribe status. As he belongs to Bhogta community, he was unable to run for reelection in his seat, Chatra Assembly constituency, which he won in 2019 and is reserved for Scheduled Caste. According to him, it is a conspiracy against Bhogta as after inclusion in Scheduled Tribe, Bhogta people will not be able to contest Schedule Caste reserved seat and Bhogta people will not be able to win in Scheduled Tribe seat as they are minority in Scheduled Tribe reserved seat area.
