= Ram Chandra Ram =

Indian politician

Ram Chandra Ram (died 2 March 2009, Ranchi) was an Indian politician, affiliated to the Communist Party of India (CPI).

== History ==
Ram made his electoral debut in the Simaria Legislative Assembly constituency in the 1990 Bihar Legislative Assembly election. He finished in second place with 18,832 votes (30.04% of the vote). In the 1995 Bihar Legislative Assembly election, Ram finished in second place in Simaria with 19,271 votes (24.36%).

Ram contested the 2000 Bihar Legislative Assembly election. He finished in third place in Simaria with 11,532 votes (24.11%).

Ram contested the 2005 Jharkhand Legislative Assembly election (the state of Jharkhand had been carved out of Bihar by this time). He finished in second place in Simaria with 24,438 votes (23.2%).

Ram was elected to the Jharkhand Legislative Assembly in a by-election held for the Simaria seat in February 2008. The by-poll had been called following the death of incumbent BJP legislator Upendra Nath Das. Ram's campaign was supported by the Communist Party of India (Marxist) (CPI(M)), Rashtriya Janata Dal (RJD) and Jharkhand Mukti Morcha (JMM). The Union Railway Minister Laloo Prasad Yadav visited Simaria to campaign for Ram. Ram obtained 30,700 votes (26.31%). Following the by-election, Ram became the sole CPI legislator in the 82-member assembly. He took his oath as a Member of the Legislative Assembly in Ranchi on 8 February 2008.

Ram suffered a heart attack in Ranchi on 2 March 2009. He was declared dead upon reaching Central Coalfield Ltd (CCL) hospital.
