= Hussainabad, Jharkhand =

Hussainabad Japla
- Town
- Location in Jharkhand, India Hussainabad (India)
- Coordinates: 24.53°N 84.02°E
- Country: India
- State: Jharkhand
- District: Palamu
- Named for: Nawab Syed Ghulam Hussain

Government
  - Type: Municipal governance in India
  - Body: Nagar Panchayat Hussainabad
- Elevation: 145 m (476 ft)

Population (2012)
  - Total: 35,433

Languages
  - Official: Hindi
- Time zone: UTC+5:30 (IST)
- PIN: 822116
- Telephone code: 06566
- Vehicle registration: JH
- Website: www.japla.in

Hussainabad, informally called Japla, is a town and subdivision in Palamu district in the Indian state of Jharkhand. Hussainabad was named after its founder Nawab Ghulam Hussain. It is also known as Japla on the name of Japla Cement Factory. It is situated at the westernmost part of Jharkhand near Deori, on the bank of River Son.

== Demographics ==
In the 2001 Indian census, Hussainabad had a population of 23,433. Males constituted 53% of the population and females constituted 47%. Hussainabad had an average literacy rate of 54%, lower than the national average of 59.5%: the male literacy rate was 62%, and the female literacy rate was 45%. 18% of the population was under 6 years of age.

== Geography ==
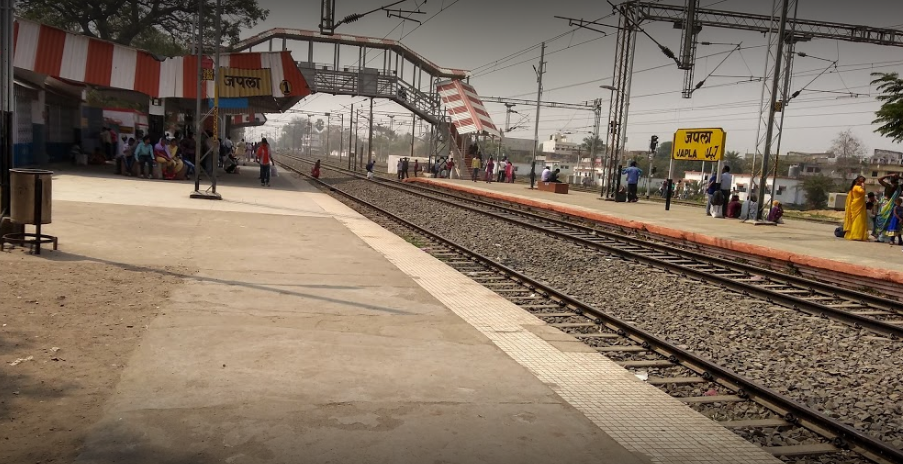
Japla station

Hussainabad is situated at 24.53°N 84.02°E. It has an average elevation of 145 m (476 ft).

Hussainabad serves as the main market for nearby villages. It is on the border of Jharkhand and Bihar. The town has a railway station. Towards Bihar, the following stations are Kajratnawadih station and Nabinagar station. Railway is the main source for intercity commutation but local buses and small vehicles also operate between nearby cities.

Approximately 4 kilometres (2.5 mi) from Japla is Sone Valley Cements Limited (formerly known as Sone Valley Port Land Cement Company Limited), on the bank of Sone River, which ceased operating in 1993. It was first Portland cement factory of India established during the British regime. It is said that the Mohraon Bungalow of Sone Valley Cements was among some of the finest bungalows in the state of Bihar, and equipped with modern amenities. After the closure of the factory, the bungalow fell into ruin. Initial economic growth in the town could be attributed to the cement factory, whose employees visited town to purchase goods for day-to-day needs, thus promoting the town's trade and commerce. The town now serves as the main market for nearby villages.

== Infrastructure ==
In the absence of governmental help for improvement, Hussainabad has only basic infrastructure. Roads are single carriageway, sewerage is non-existent, and the water supply is irregular.

Basic medical facilities are provided by a government-run health centre and private medical practitioners. For advanced treatment patients either travel to the nearby town or to larger cities such as Daltonganj, Varanasi and Ranchi.

The condition of electricity supply is better than nearby towns with less than five hours of powercuts in a day. Solar power is also used for street lighting and domestic purposes.

The preferred form of public conveyance in the town is by rickshaw, auto-rickshaw and jeep.

The outskirts of the town are infested with naxalites because of surrounding dense jungle.

Educational infrastructure is basic. There are government-run schools for boys and girls and small private schools. For higher education students commute to larger cities. Some residents of Japla are well-placed and are doing well in big cities. People from Japla are working in IBM, TCS, Infosys and multinational banks.

The major source of income for residents is in small trading businesses and agriculture. The people of the villages surrounding the town also engage in agriculture. The government is the biggest employer, with the majority of the jobs coming from banks, schools, and government offices.

Amenities in Hussainabad include the nationalised banks of SBI and PNB, a post office, two petrol pumps, and picture halls.

== See also ==
- Jharkhand
- Jharkhand Legislative Assembly
- Palamu
- Palamu Loksabha constituency
