= Rohtas Fort, India =

Fort in Bihar, India

Rohtas Fort
- Part of Bihar
- Rohtas Bihar, India
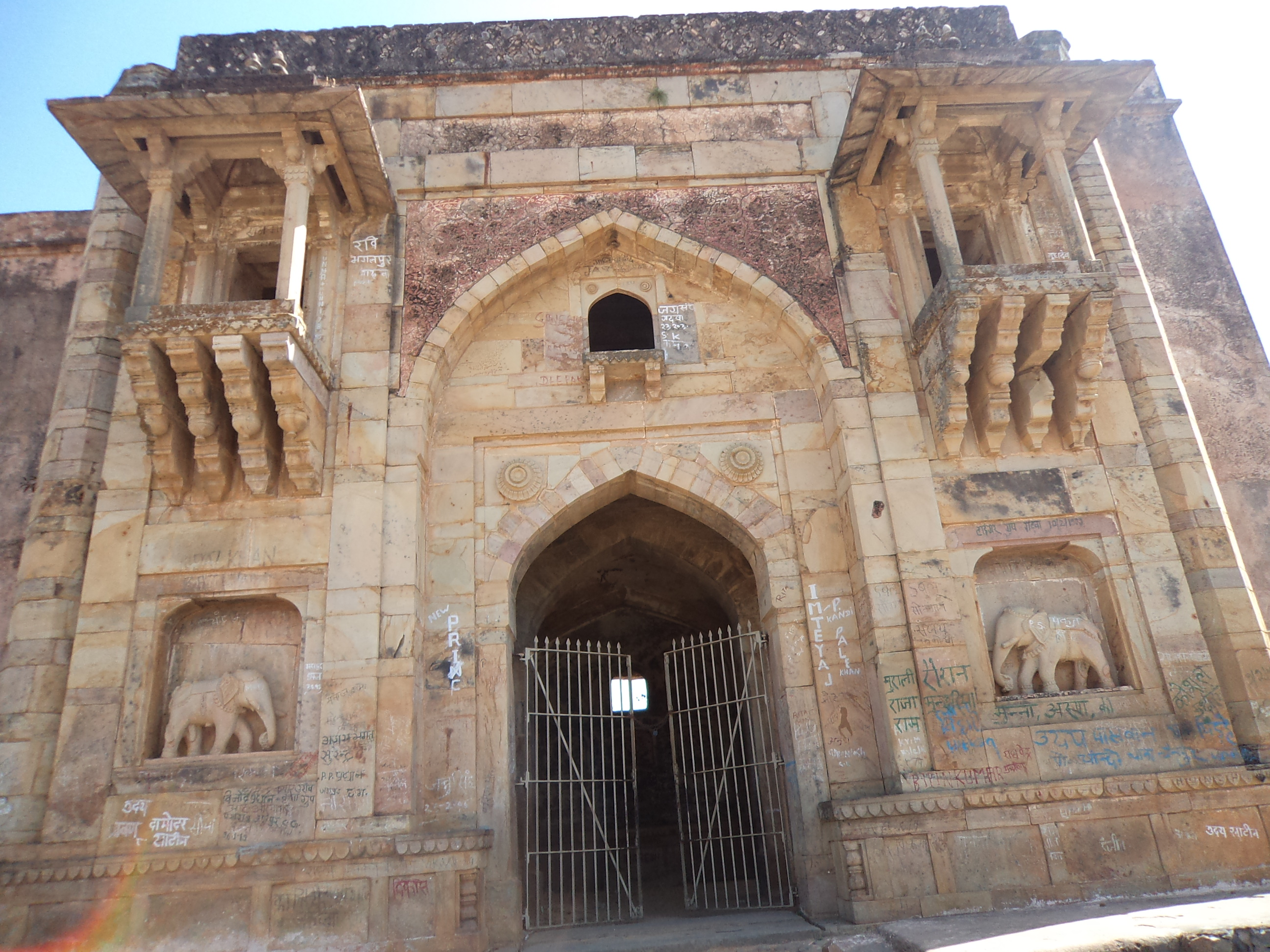
- Entrance Gate of Rohtas Fort

Site information
- Type: Fort
- Controlled by: Government of Bihar
- Condition: Restored

Location
- Location within India Location within Bihar
- Coordinates: 24.6233337°N 83.9155484°E

Site history
- Built by: Gahadavala dynasty; Khayaravala dynasty; Sur Empire; Mughal Empire
- Materials: Granite Stones and lime mortar

The Rohtasgarh or Rohtas Fort is located in the Son River valley, in the small town of Rohtas in Bihar, India.

== Location ==
Rohtasgarh is situated on the upper course of the river Son, 24° 57′ N, 84° 2′E. It takes around two hours from Sasaram to reach the foot of the hill over which is the Rohtas fort. It can be reached easily from the Dehri town, which has very good road network. One can also easily reach Rohtas fort via Akbarpur. The fort is situated at about 1500 feet above sea level. The 2000 old limestone steps were probably meant for elephants. For the visitor, they are exhausting climb of an hour and a half. At the end of the climb, one reaches the boundary wall of the fort. A dilapidated gate with a cupola can be seen there, which is the first of many gates provided for well-guarded entrances to the fort. From here one has to walk another mile or so before the ruins of Rohtas can be seen.

== History ==
The early history of Rohtas is obscure. According to the local legends, the Rohtas hill was named after the Rohitāśva, the son of a legendary king Harishchandra. However, the legends about Rohitāśva make no mention of this area, and no pre-7th century ruins have been found at the site.

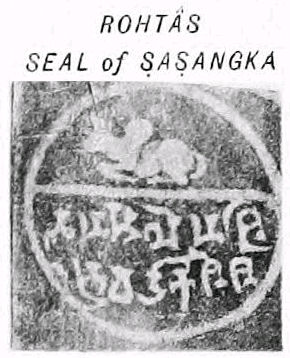
The Rohtas seal of Shashanka.

The oldest record at Rohtas is a short inscription of "Mahasamanta Shashanka-dava", whom John Faithfull Fleet identified with the Gauda king Shashanka. The Chandra and Tunga dynasties, which ruled in Bengal and Odisha regions respectively, traced their origin to a place called Rohitagiri, which may possibly be modern Rohtas. However, no evidence has been found at Rohtas to confirm this theory.

A 1223 CE (1279 VS) inscription suggests that Rohtasgarh was in possession of one Shri Pratapa. The inscription states that he defeated a "Yavana" army; the "Yavana" here probably refers to a Muslim general. F. Kielhorn identified Shri Pratapa (Śrī-Pratāpa) as a member of the Khayaravala dynasty, whose inscriptions have been found at other locations in the Rohtas district. The members of this dynasty ruled the Japila territory as feudatories, possibly that of the Gahadavalas. The Khayaravalas are probably represented by the modern Kharwars.

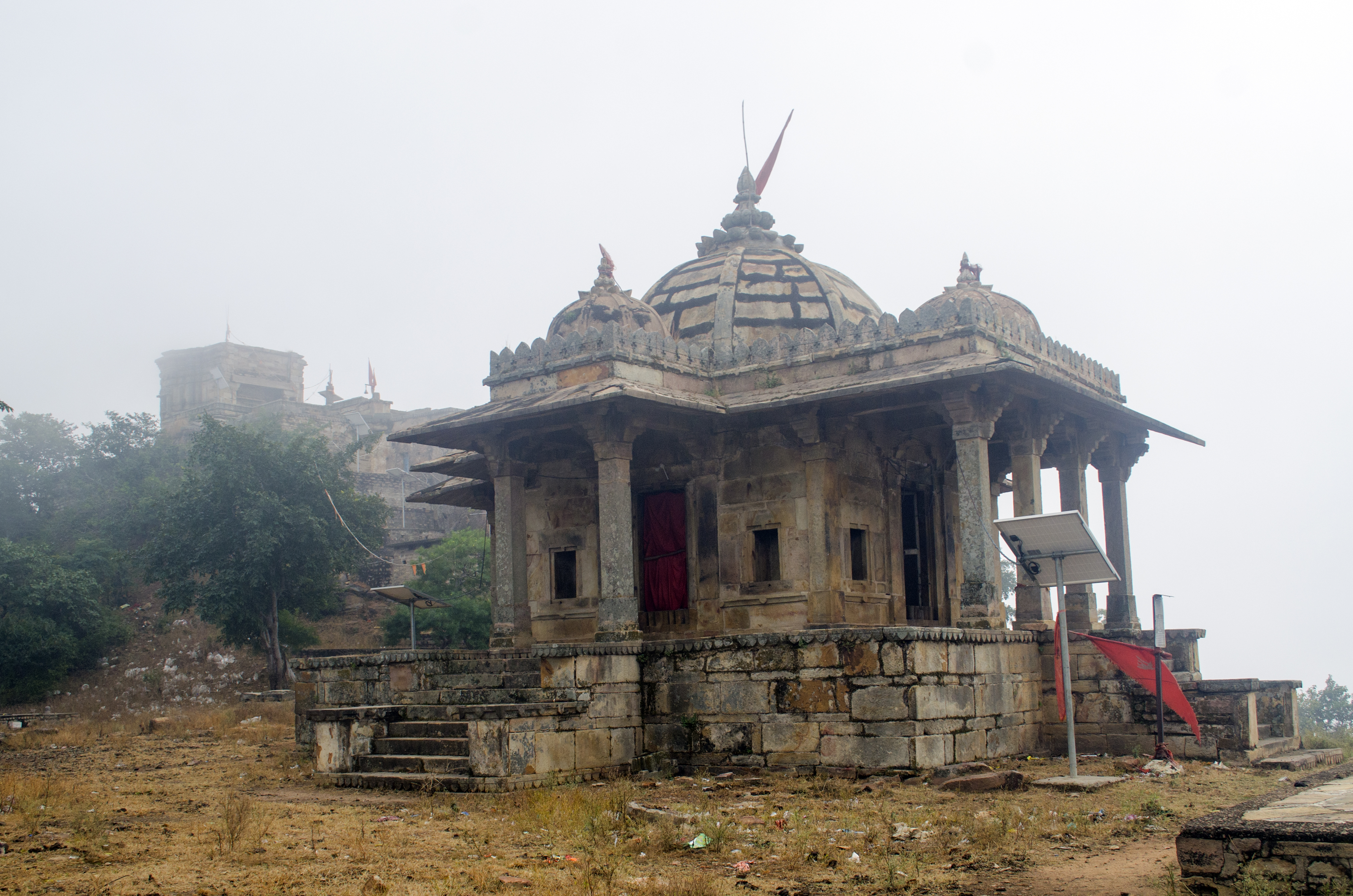
Devi temple, Rohtasgarh fort

In 1539 CE, the Fort of Rohtas passed out of the hands of the Hindu kings into those of Sher Shah Suri. Sher Shah Suri had just lost the Fort at Chunar in a fight with the Mughal emperor Humayun and was desperate to gain a foothold for himself. Sher Shah requested the ruler of Rohtas that he wanted to leave his women, children and treasure in the safety of the fort, while he was away fighting in Bengal. The king agreed and the first few palanquins had women and children. But the later ones contained fierce Afghan soldiers, who captured Rohtas and forced the Hindu king to flee. During Sher Shah Suri's reign 10000-armed men guarded the fort and it contained a permanent garrison.

Haibat Khan, a general of Sher Shah Suri built the Jami Masjid in 1543 AD, which lies to the west of the fort. It is made of white sandstone and comprises three domes each with a minaret. There is also a mausoleum of Habsh Khan, the daroga or the superintendent of works of Sher Shah.

In 1559 AD, it was ruled by the Raja Dushasan Shah (Surwar rajput), Raja of Dhaudharh kingdom, also his descendants held the Quile-dari of this fortress, until they got defeated by Aurangzeb and shifted to Palamu region and established Namudag -Mahuari Kingdom.

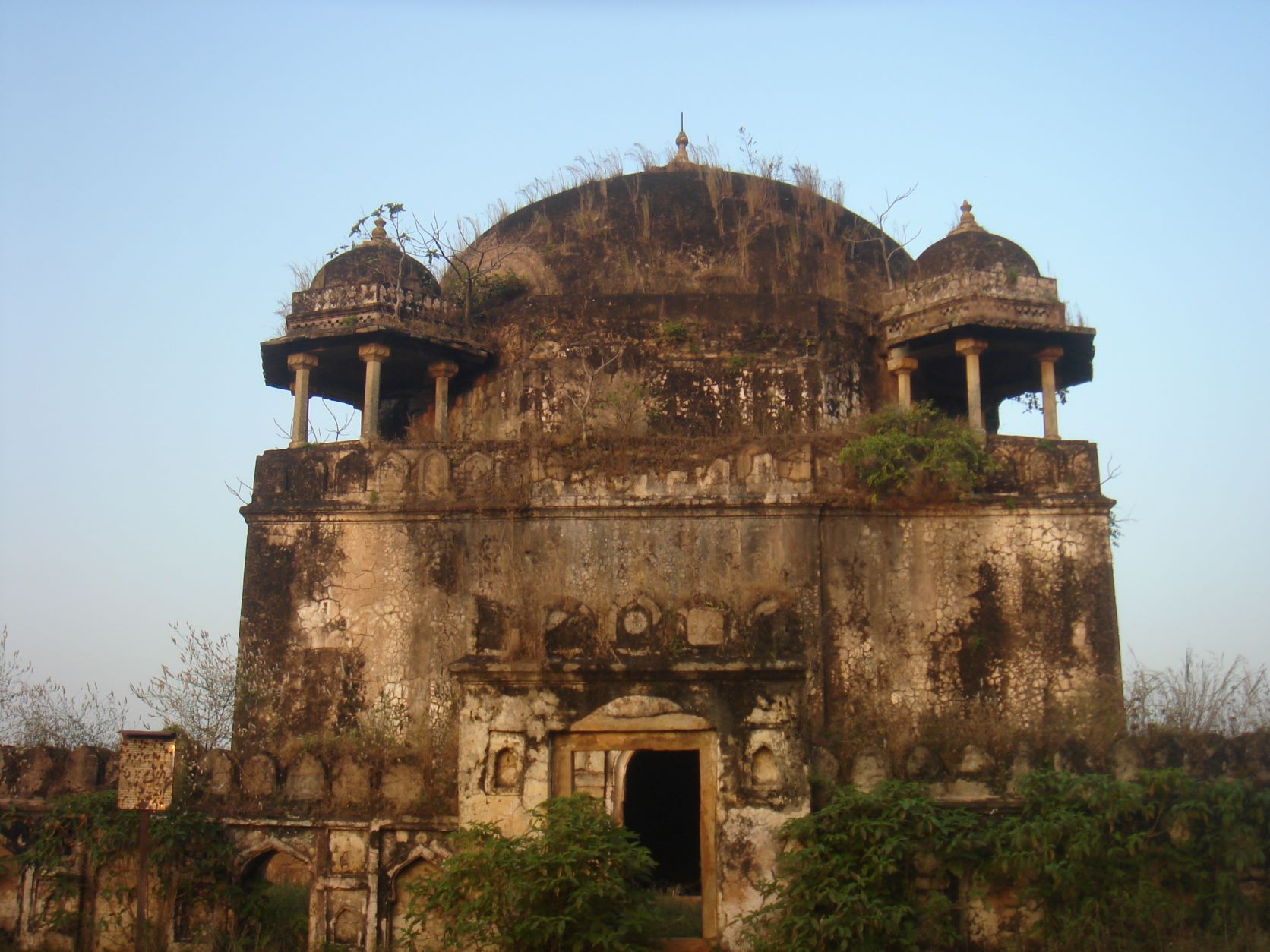

In 1558 AD, Raja Man Singh, Akbar's general and governor, ruled Rohtas. As the Governor of Bengal and Bihar, he made Rohtas his headquarters in view of its inaccessibility and other natural defenses. He built a splendid palace 'Mahal Sarai' for himself, renovated the rest of the fort, cleared up the ponds and made gardens in Persian style. The palace was constructed in a north-south axis, with its entrance to the west with barracks for soldiers in front. The fort is still in a fairly good condition.

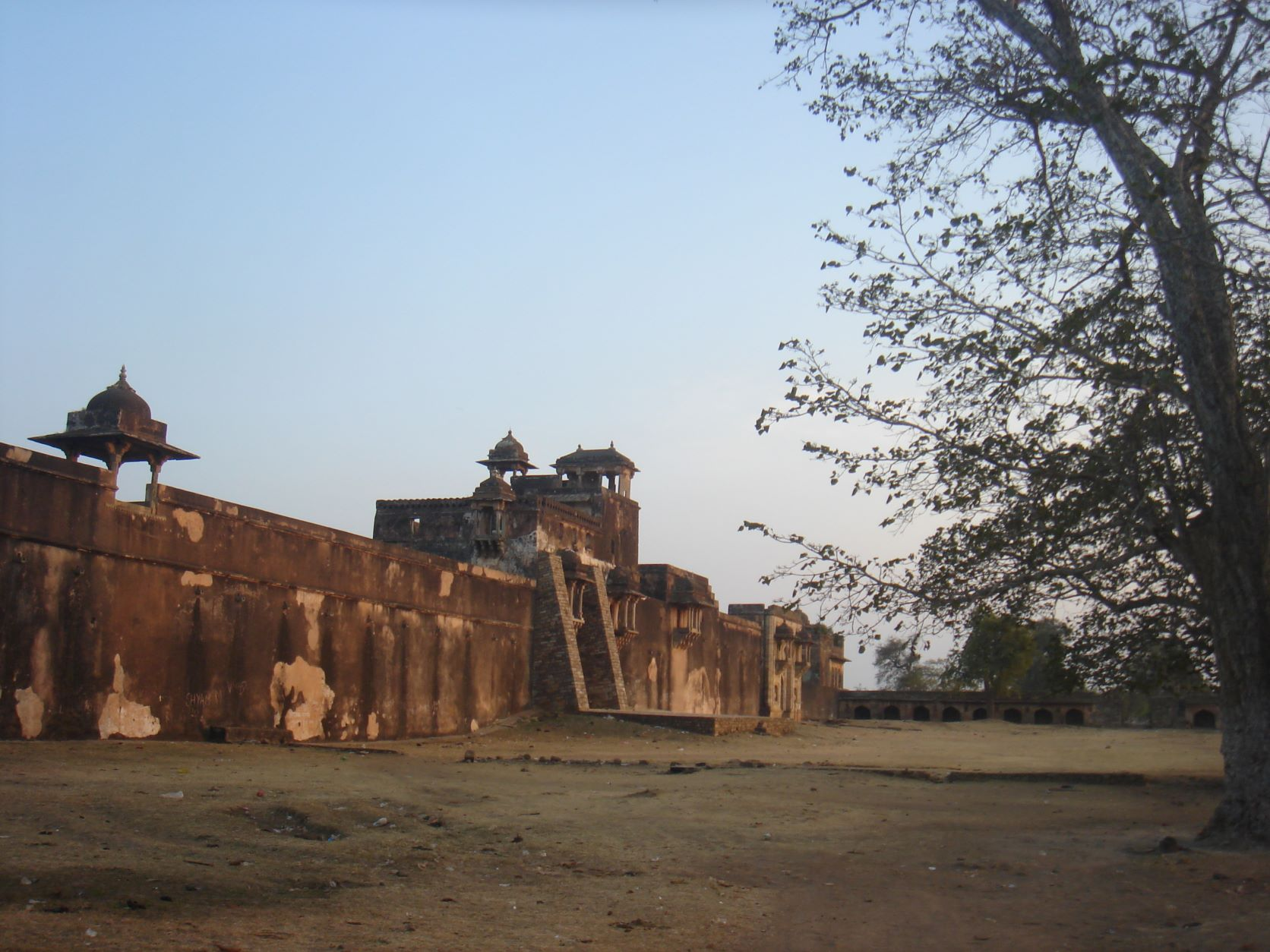
Mahal Sarai

After the death of Man Singh, the fort came under the jurisdiction of the office of the Emperor's wazir from where the governors were appointed. In 1621 AD, the Prince Khurram revolted against his father Jahangir and took refuge at Rohtas. The guardian of the fort, Saiyyad Mubarak handed over the keys of Rohtas to the prince. Khurram once again came to Rohtas for safety when he tried to win Avadh, but lost the battle of Kampat. His son Murad Baksh was born to his wife Mumtaz Mahal. During Aurangzeb's reign the fort was used as a detention camp for those under trial and housing prisoners sentenced for life.

In 1763 AD, in the Battle of Udhwa Nala, the Nawab of Bihar and Bengal, Mir Kasim, lost to the British and fled with his family to Rohtas. But he was not able to hide at the fort. Finally the Diwan of Rohtas, Shahmal handed it over to the British Captain Goddard. During his two-month stay at the fort, the Captain destroyed the storeroom and many of the fortifications. Goddard left, keeping some guards in charge of the fort, but they too left after a year.

There was peace at the fort for the next 100 years or so, which was at last broken at the time of the First War of Independence in 1857. Amar Singh, the brother of Kunwar Singh, together with his companions took refuge here. There were many encounters with the British where the latter were at a disadvantage, for the jungles and the tribal in them were of great help to the Indian soldiers. Finally, after a long drawn out military blockade and many clashes, the British overcame the Indians.

== Architecture ==
It is considered to be one of the largest forts in world as remnants of fort are spread across 42 square km. It has 83 gates and network of many underground place and tunnels.

=== Hathiya Pol or Elephant Gate ===
The main gate is known as the Hathiya Pol or the Elephant Gate, named after the two elephants, which decorate it. It is the largest of the gates and was made in 1597 AD.

=== Takht-e-Badshahi, Diwaan-e-Khas, Baradari, Aina Mahal ===
The largest structure within the fort palace is, the Takht-e-Badshahi, where Raja Man Singh resided. It is a four-storied building, with a cupola on top.

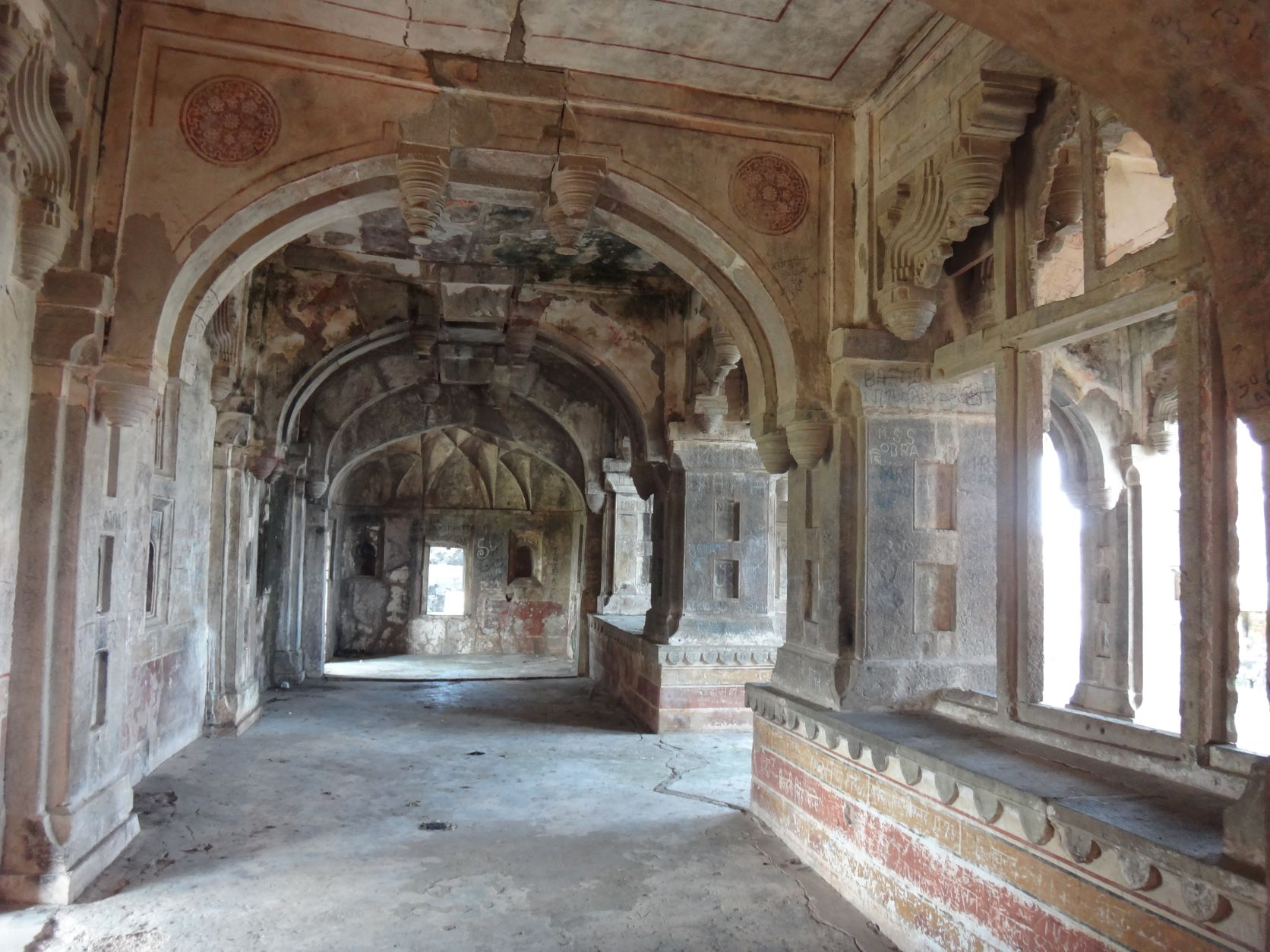

There is an assembly hall in the second floor and a gallery resting on strong, engraved stone pillars.

The third floor has a tiny cupola, which opens into the women' quarters. From the fourth floor one can get a bird's eye view of the surrounding area, including Rohtasan Temple in the east, located about four kms away.

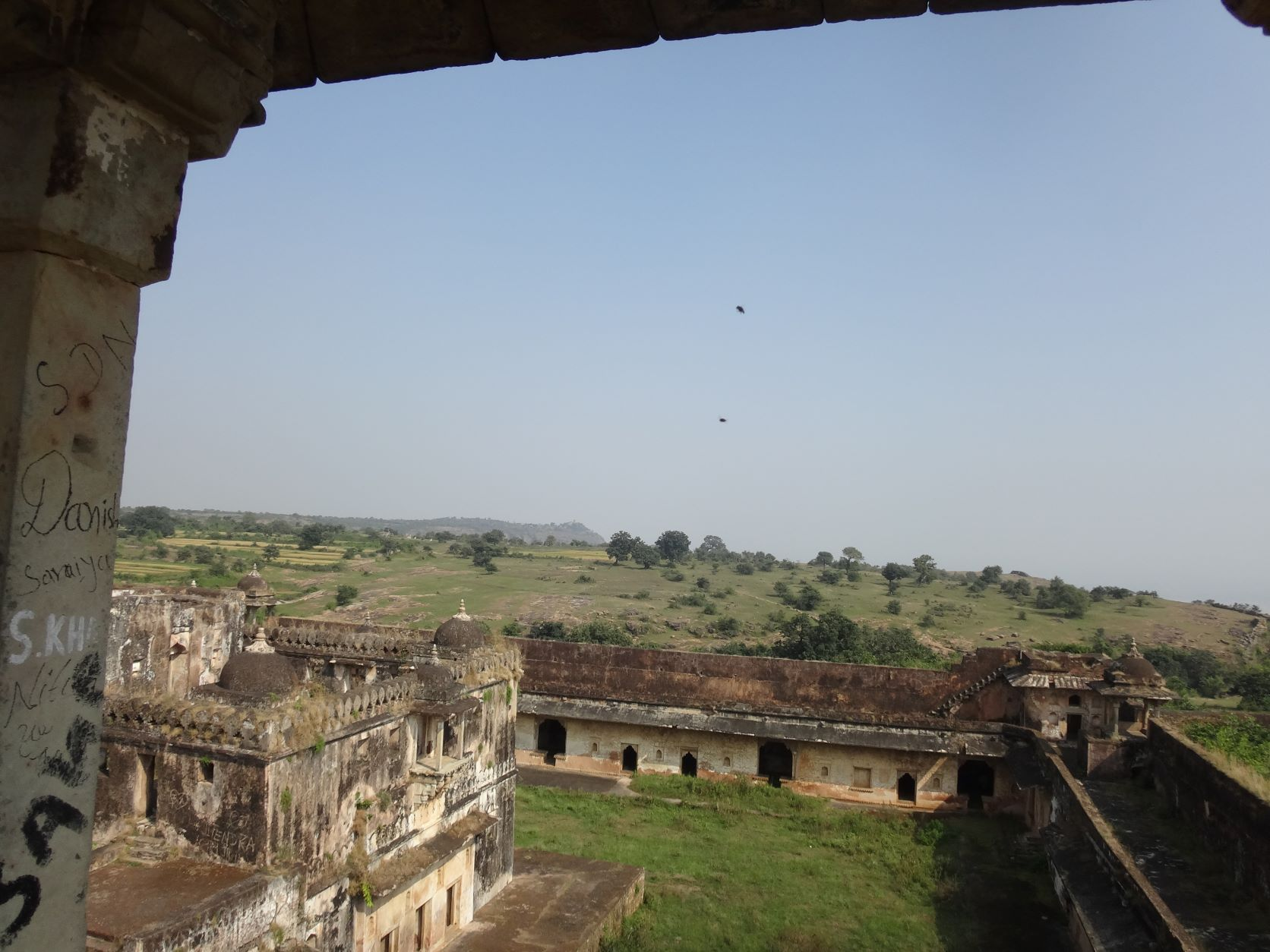

The residential quarters of Raja Man Singh were on the first floor, which was connected to the ladies' rooms via a gateway in the east.

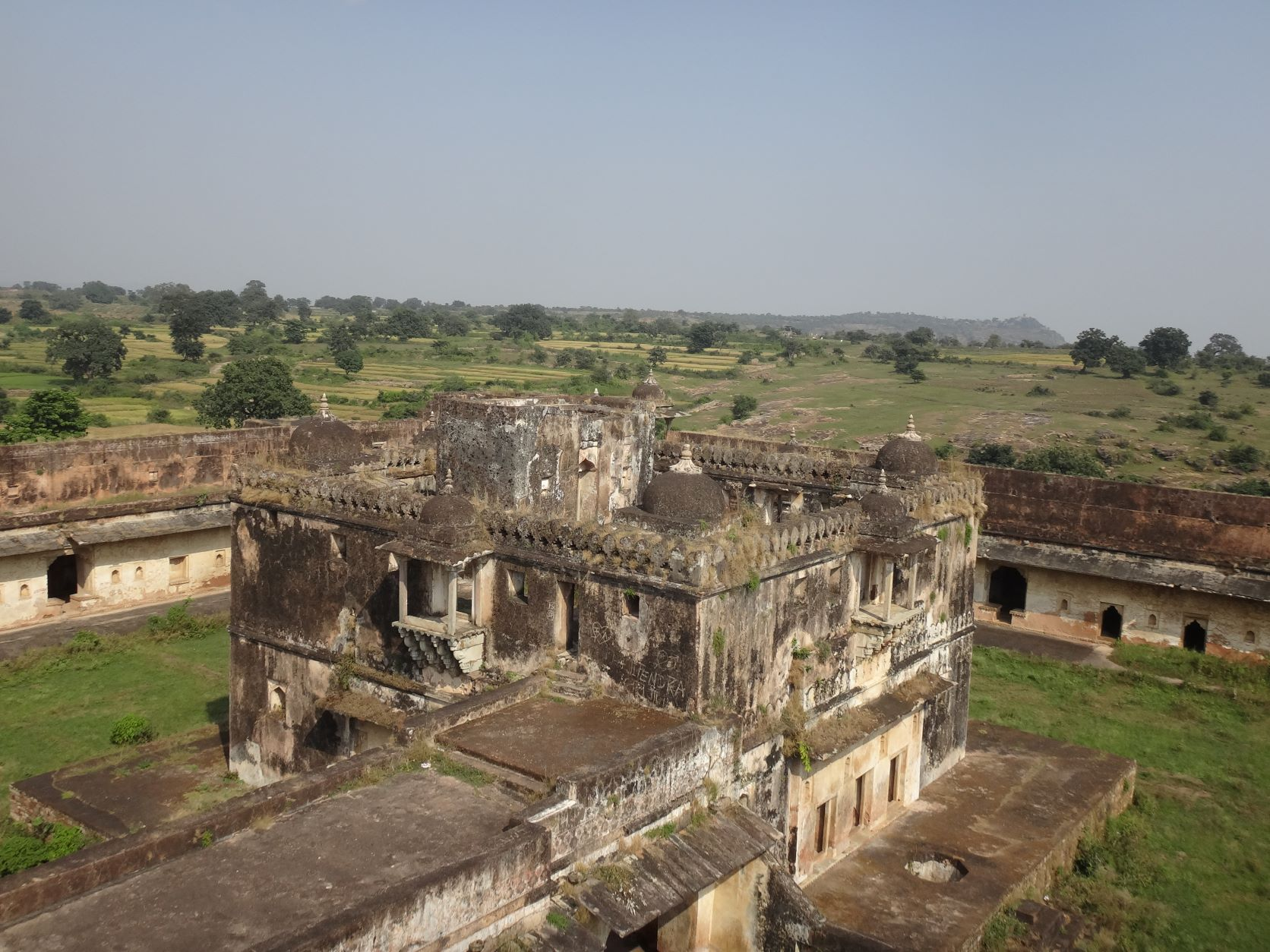
Ruins of Aina Mahal

Aina Mahal (Mirror Palace) was the palace of the chief wife of Raja Man Singh. It is located in the middle of the palace. Some beautiful carvings can still be seen inside and at the entrance.

An assembly hall, probably the Diwan-e-Khas or the hall or private audience is a little towards the west of Baradari or the hall of public audience. The hall is decorated with etchings of flowers and leaves, and lies on similarly decorated pillars.

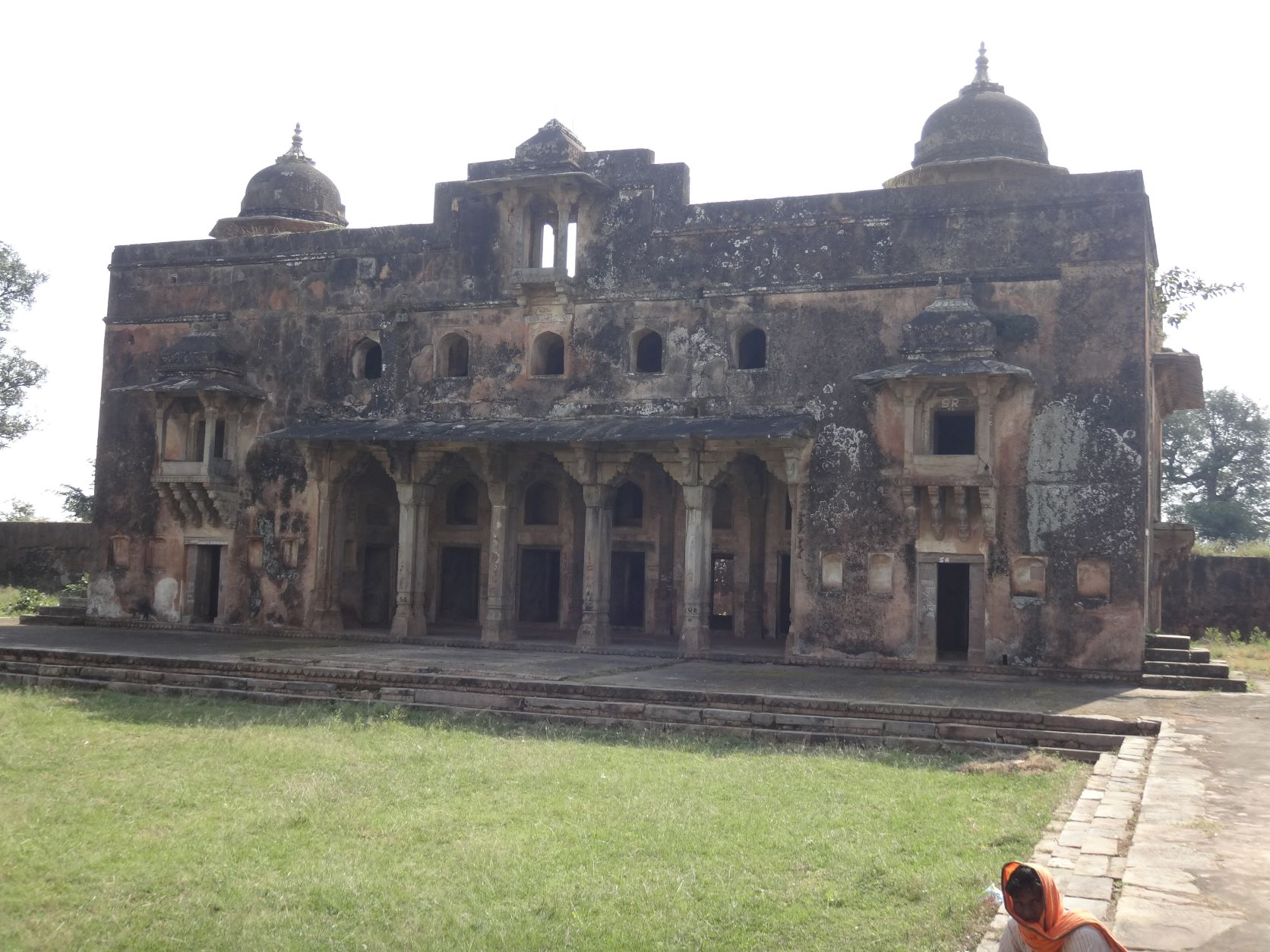

=== Jamia Masjid and Habsh Khan's mausoleum ===
Outside the palace grounds are the buildings of Jamia Masjid, Habsh Khan's Mausoleum and the Makbara of Shufi Sultan. The beautiful stucco style, with the cupola resting on pillars reminds of the Rajputana style where the domed structures are known as chhatris. Each dome is accompanied by a minaret. This style had not been used in Bengal and Bihar earlier but its emergence at Rohtas was not surprising as more than half the fort's guardians came from Rajputana.

=== Ganesh Temple ===
About half a kilometer to the west of Man Singh's Palace is a Ganesh temple. The sanctum of the temple faces two porch-ways. The tall imposing superstructure corresponds the temples of Rajputana (Rajasthan), especially of Ossian near Jodhpur built in the 8th century AD and the Mira Bai temple of the 17th century AD at Chittor.

=== The Hanging House ===
Further towards west, some construction must have taken place although there is no written evidence of what it was. The locals call it the Hanging House, as the fall from here is a straight 1500 ft down with no obstacles on the way. Locals have a story to tell about this place that this spot is the mouth of a cave, where a Muslim fakir (mendicant) is buried. It is said that he was thrown from here into the valley three times. In spite of being bound hand and foot, the fakir escaped unhurt each time. Ultimately he was buried in the cave.

=== Rohtasan Temple And Devi Temple ===
About a mile to the North-East of the Palace are the ruins of two temples. One is the Rohtasan, a temple of Lord Shiva. Iconoclasts probably destroyed the roof and the main mandap, which housed the sacred lingam. Now only 84 steps are left, which lead to a temple. The domes crest the Devi Mandir. The idol of the deity is missing from here also, though the rest of the building is in good condition. In local language it is also said "Chourasan Siddhi" because of its 84 steps.

== See also ==
- Sher Shah Suri Tomb
- Munger Fort
- Darbhanga Fort
- Rajnagar Palace
