= 2014 Indian general election in Jharkhand =

Indian general election, 2014 in Jharkhand
- 10, 17, 24 April 2014.

All 14 constituencies from Jharkhand to the Lok Sabha
- Turnout: 63.82% (▲12.84%)
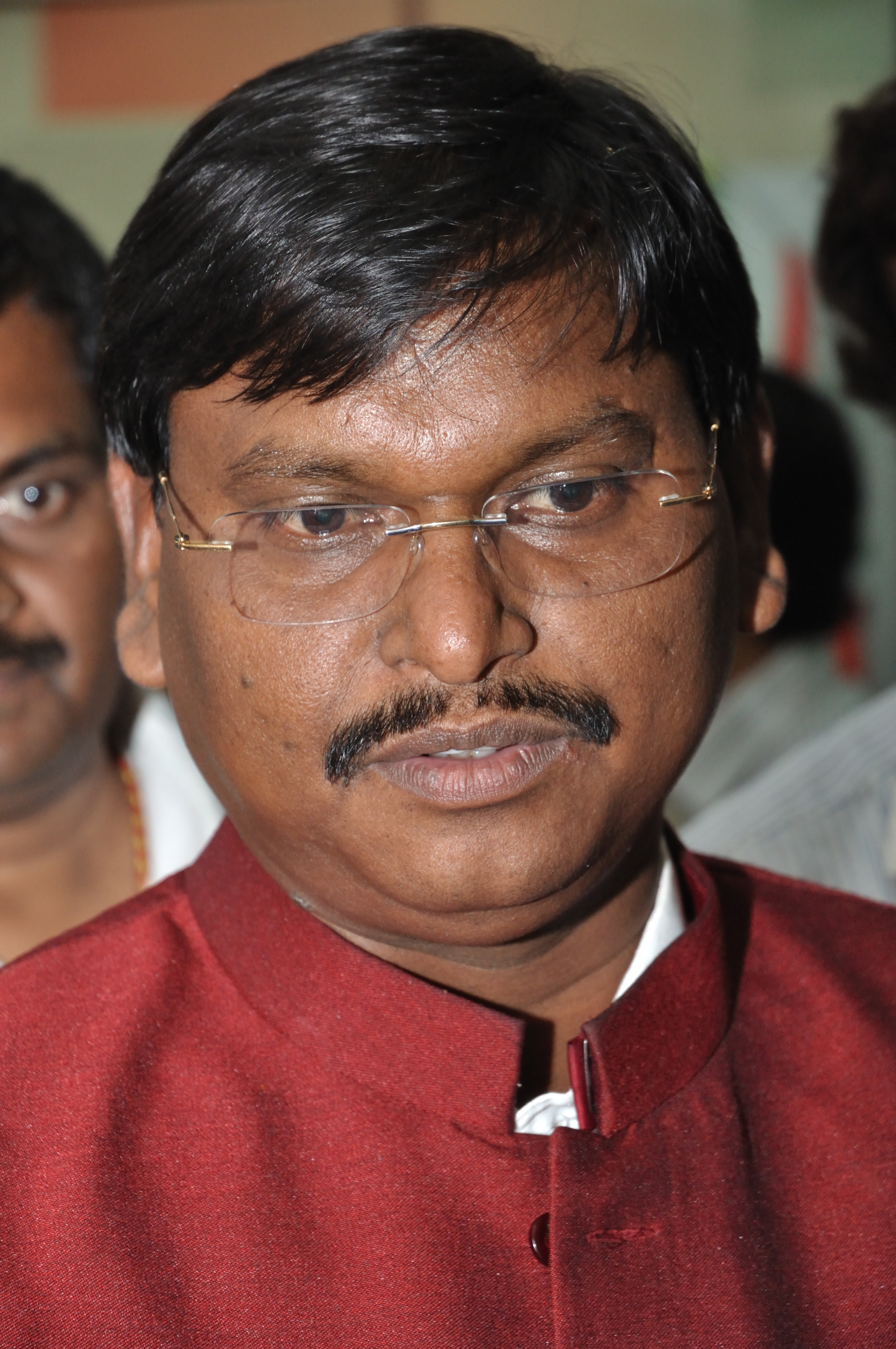

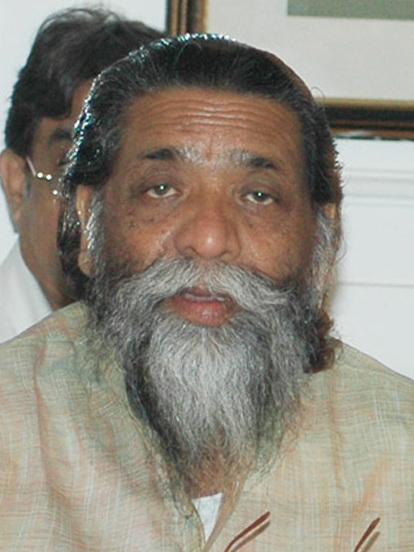
| | Majority party | Minority party |
|---|---|---|
| Leader | Arjun Munda | Shibu Soren |
| Party | BJP | JMM |
| Alliance | NDA | UPA |
| Last election | 8 seats | 3 seats |
| Seats won | 12 | 2 |
| Seat change | ▲4 | ▼1 |
| Popular vote | 5,207,439 | 3,141,842 |
| Percentage | 40.1% | 24.6% |
- Seatwise Result Map of the 2014 general election in Jharkhand
Prime Minister before election
Manmohan Singh
INC
Prime Minister after election
Narendra Modi
BJP

The 2014 Indian general election in Jharkhand were held for 14 seats in the state. The voting process was held in three phases on 10, 17 and 24 April 2014.

== Parties and alliances ==
=== National Democratic Alliance ===
| Party | Flag | Symbol | Leader | Seats contested |
|---|---|---|---|---|
| Bharatiya Janata Party | | | Arjun Munda | 14 |

=== United Progressive Alliance ===
| Party | Flag | Symbol | Leader | Seats contested |
|---|---|---|---|---|
| Indian National Congress | | | Sukhdeo Bhagat | 9 |
| Jharkhand Mukti Morcha | | | Shibu Soren | 4 |
| Rashtriya Janata Dal | | | Lalu Prasad Yadav | 1 |

=== Other Parties ===
| Party | Flag | Symbol | Leader | Seats contested |
|---|---|---|---|---|
| Jharkhand Vikas Morcha (Prajatantrik) | | | Babulal Marandi | 14 |
| All India Trinamool Congress | | | Chandra Shekhar Dubey | 10 |
| All Jharkhand Students Union | | | Sudesh Mahato | 9 |

== List of Candidates ==
| Constituency | | NDA | | UPA | | JVM(P) | | AJSUP | |
| # | Name | Party | Candidate | Party | Candidate | Party | Candidate | Party | Candidate |
|---|---|---|---|---|---|---|---|---|---|
| 1 | Rajmahal | BJP | Hemlal Murmu | JMM | Vijay Kumar Hansdak | JVM | Dr. Anil Murmu | AJSU | Arjun Prasad Singh |
| 2 | Dumka | BJP | Sunil Soren | JMM | Shibu Soren | JVM | Babu Lal Marandi | | |
| 3 | Godda | BJP | Nishikant Dubey | INC | Furkan Ansari | JVM | Pradip Yadav | AJSU | Subodh Prasad |
| 4 | Chatra | BJP | Sunil Kumar Singh | INC | Dhiraj Prasad Sahu | JVM | Nilam Devi | AJSU | Nagmani |
| 5 | Kodarma | BJP | Ravindra Kumar Ray | INC | Tilakdhari Singh | JVM | Pranav Kumar Verma | AJSU | Najrul Hassan Hashmi |
| 6 | Giridih | BJP | Ravindra Kumar Pandey | JMM | Jagarnath Mahto | JVM | Saba Ahmad | AJSU | Umesh Chandra Mehta |
| 7 | Dhanbad | BJP | Pashupati Nath Singh | INC | Ajay Kumar Dubey | JVM | Samaresh Singh | AJSU | Hemlata S. Mohan |
| 8 | Ranchi | BJP | Ram Tahal Choudhary | INC | Subodh Kant Sahay | JVM | Amitabh Choudhary | AJSU | Sudesh Kumar Mahto |
| 9 | Jamshedpur | BJP | Bidyut Baran Mahato | JMM | Niroop Mahanty | JVM | Ajay Kumar | | |
| 10 | Singhbhum | BJP | Laxman Giluwa | INC | Chitrasen Sinku | JVM | Dashrath Gagrai | | |
| 11 | Khunti | BJP | Kariya Munda | INC | Kali Charan Munda | JVM | Basant Kumar Longa | AJSU | Neil Tirkey |
| 12 | Lohardaga | BJP | Sudarshan Bhagat | INC | Rameshwar Oraon | JVM | Birendra Bhagat | | |
| 13 | Palamau | BJP | Vishnu Dayal Ram | RJD | Manoj Kumar | JVM | Ghuran Ram | | |
| 14 | Hazaribagh | BJP | Jayant Sinha | INC | Saurabh Narain Singh | JVM | Arun Kumar Mishra | AJSU | Loknath Mahto |

== Result ==
=== Results by Party/Alliance ===
| Alliance/ Party | | Popular vote | | | Seats | | |
| Alliance/ Party | | Votes | % | ±pp | Contested | Won | +/− |
|---|---|---|---|---|---|---|---|
| NDA | BJP | 52,07,439 | 40.11 | ▲12.58 | 14 | 12 | ▲4 |
| UPA | INC | 17,24,740 | 13.28 | ▼1.74 | 9 | 0 | ▼1 |
| UPA | JMM | 12,05,031 | 9.28 | ▼2.42 | 4 | 2 | Steady |
| UPA | RJD | 2,12,571 | 1.64 | ▼3.69 | 1 | 0 | Steady |
| UPA | Total | 31,42,342 | 24.20 | ▼2.52 | 14 | 2 | ▼1 |
| JVM(P) | | 15,67,655 | 12.07 | ▲1.59 | 14 | 0 | ▼1 |
| AJSU | | 4,81,667 | 3.71 | ▲1.52 | 9 | 0 | Steady |
| AITC | | 3,06,332 | 2.36 | Steady | 10 | 0 | Steady |
| Others | | 16,60,354 | 12.79 | Steady | 102 | 0 | Steady |
| IND | | 4,26,224 | 3.28 | ▼7.84 | 77 | 0 | ▼2 |
| NOTA | | 1,90,927 | 1.47 | Steady | | | |
| Total | | 1,29,82,940 | 100% | - | 240 | 14 | - |

== List of elected MPs ==
Keys: BJP (12) JMM (2)

| Constituency | | Winner | | | | Runner Up | | | | Margin | % |
| # | Name | Candidate | Party | Votes | % | Candidate | Party | Votes | % | Margin | % |
|---|---|---|---|---|---|---|---|---|---|---|---|
| 1 | Rajmahal | Vijay Hansdak | JMM | 379,507 | 39.87 | Hemlal Murmu | BJP | 338,170 | 35.53 | 41,337 | 4.34 |
| 2 | Dumka | Shibu Soren | JMM | 335,815 | 37.19 | Sunil Soren | BJP | 296,785 | 32.86 | 39,030 | 4.33 |
| 3 | Godda | Nishikant Dubey | BJP | 380,500 | 36.25 | Furkan Ansari | INC | 319,818 | 30.47 | 60,682 | 5.78 |
| 4 | Chatra | Sunil Kumar Singh | BJP | 295,862 | 41.50 | Dhiraj Prasad Sahu | INC | 117,836 | 16.53 | 178,026 | 24.97 |
| 5 | Kodarma | Ravindra Kumar Ray | BJP | 365,410 | 35.65 | Raj Kumar Yadav | CPI(ML) | 266,756 | 26.03 | 98,654 | 9.62 |
| 6 | Giridih | Ravindra Kumar Pandey | BJP | 391,913 | 40.35 | Jagarnath Mahto | JMM | 351,600 | 36.20 | 40,313 | 4.15 |
| 7 | Dhanbad | Pashupati Nath Singh | BJP | 543,491 | 47.51 | Ajay Kumar Dubey | INC | 250,537 | 21.90 | 292,954 | 25.61 |
| 8 | Ranchi | Ram Tahal Choudhary | BJP | 448,729 | 42.74 | Subodh Kant Sahay | INC | 249,426 | 23.76 | 199,303 | 18.98 |
| 9 | Jamshedpur | Bidyut Baran Mahato | BJP | 464,153 | 44.24 | Ajoy Kumar | JVM(P) | 364,277 | 34.72 | 99,876 | 9.52 |
| 10 | Singhbhum | Laxman Giluwa | BJP | 303,131 | 38.11 | Geeta Koda | JBSP | 215,607 | 27.11 | 87,524 | 11.00 |
| 11 | Khunti | Kariya Munda | BJP | 269,185 | 36.49 | Anosh Ekka | JKP | 176,937 | 23.99 | 92,248 | 12.50 |
| 12 | Lohardaga | Sudarshan Bhagat | BJP | 226,666 | 34.78 | Rameshwar Oraon | INC | 220,177 | 33.79 | 6,489 | 0.99 |
| 13 | Palamau | Vishnu Dayal Ram | BJP | 476,513 | 48.72 | Manoj Kumar | RJD | 212,571 | 21.73 | 263,942 | 26.99 |
| 14 | Hazaribagh | Jayant Sinha | BJP | 406,931 | 42.07 | Saurabh Narain Singh | INC | 247,803 | 25.62 | 159,128 | 16.45 |

== Post-election Union Council of Ministers from Jharkhand ==
| # | Name | Constituency | Designation | Department | From | To | Party |
|---|---|---|---|---|---|---|---|
| 1 | Sudarshan Bhagat | Lohardaga (ST) | MoS | Social Justice and Empowerment | 27 May 2014 | 9 November 2014 | BJP |
| 1 | Sudarshan Bhagat | Lohardaga (ST) | MoS | Rural Development | 9 November 2014 | 5 July 2016 | BJP |
| 1 | Sudarshan Bhagat | Lohardaga (ST) | MoS | Agriculture and Farmers' Welfare | 5 July 2016 | 3 September 2017 | BJP |
| 1 | Sudarshan Bhagat | Lohardaga (ST) | MoS | Tribal Affairs | 3 September 2017 | 30 May 2019 | BJP |
| 2 | Jayant Sinha | Hazaribagh | MoS | Finance | 9 November 2014 | 5 July 2016 | BJP |
| 2 | Jayant Sinha | Hazaribagh | MoS | Civil Aviation | 5 July 2016 | 30 May 2019 | BJP |
| 3 | Mukhtar Abbas Naqvi | Rajya Sabha (Jharkhand) | MoS | Parliamentary Affairs | 9 November 2014 | 3 September 2017 | BJP |
| 3 | Mukhtar Abbas Naqvi | Rajya Sabha (Jharkhand) | MoS | Minority Affairs | 9 November 2014 | 12 July 2016 | BJP |
| 3 | Mukhtar Abbas Naqvi | Rajya Sabha (Jharkhand) | MoS (I/C) | Minority Affairs | 12 July 2016 | 3 September 2017 | BJP |
| 3 | Mukhtar Abbas Naqvi | Rajya Sabha (Jharkhand) | Cabinet Minister | Minority Affairs | 3 September 2017 | 30 May 2019 | BJP |

- Note: Mukhtar Abbas Naqvi represented Uttar Pradesh in the Rajya Sabha until 2016, after which he represented Jharkhand from 8 July 2016 onwards

== Assembly segments wise lead of parties ==
| Party | Assembly segments | Position in Assembly (as of 2014 election) |
|---|---|---|
| Bharatiya Janata Party | 56 | 37 |
| Indian National Congress | 3 | 6 |
| Jharkhand Mukti Morcha | 9 | 19 |
| All Jharkhand Students Union | 1 | 5 |
| Jharkhand Vikas Morcha (Prajatantrik) | 4 | 8 |
| Others | 8 | 6 |
| Total | 81 | |
