= 2004 Indian general election in Jharkhand =

- 20 and 26 April 2004

14 seats
- Turnout: 55.7%
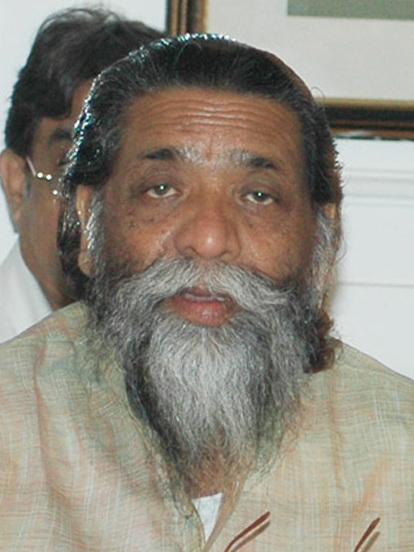

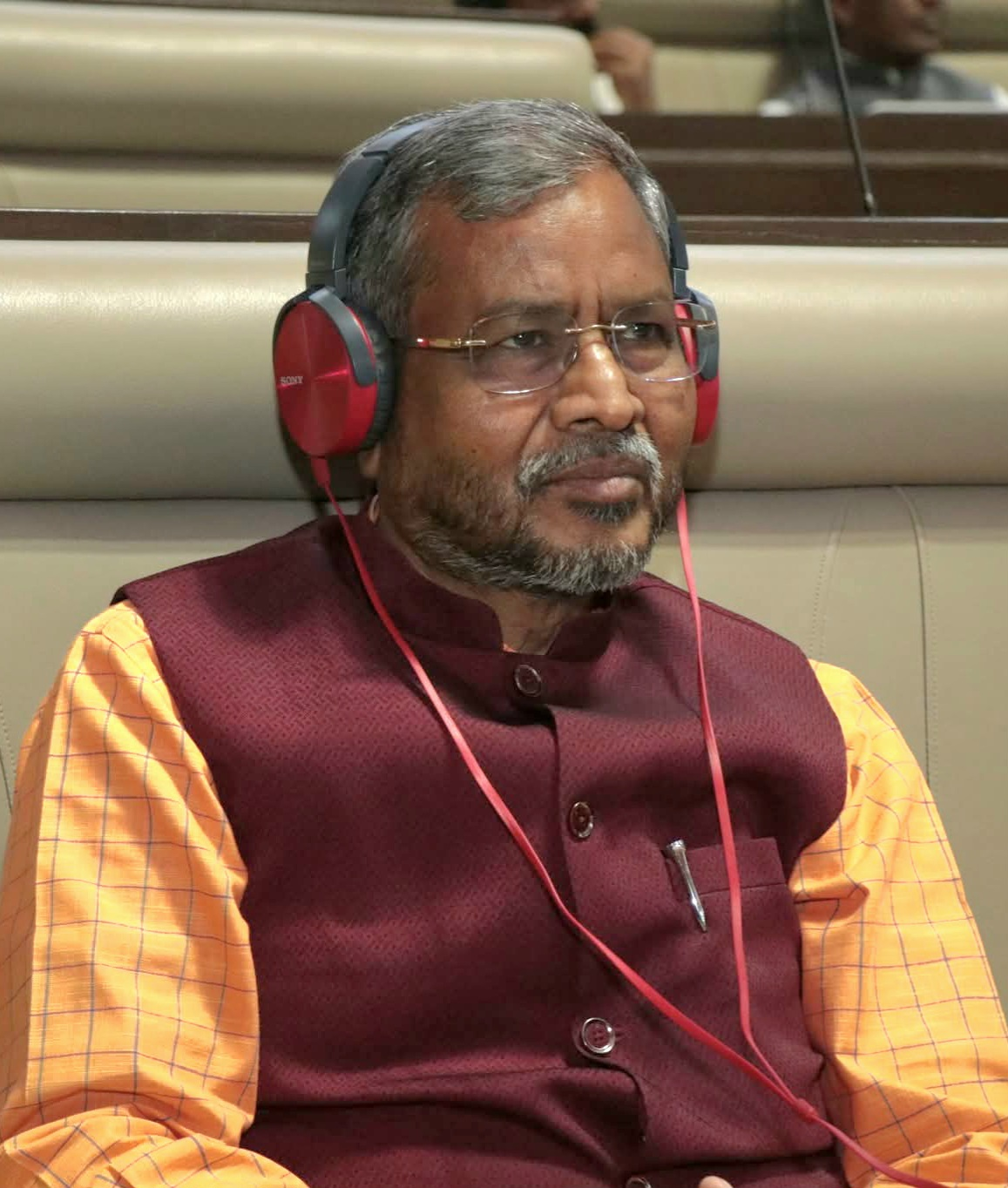
	First party	Second party
Leader	Shibu Soren	Babulal Marandi
Party	JMM	BJP
Alliance	UPA + LF	NDA
Leader's seat	Dumka (won)	Kodarma (won)
Seats won	13	1
Seat change	Steady	Steady
Percentage	37.7%	33.0%
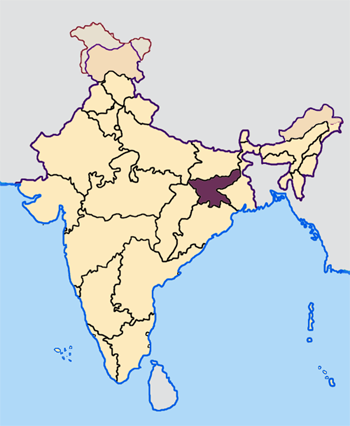
- Jharkhand
Prime Minister before election
Atal Bihari Vajpayee
BJP
Prime Minister after election
Manmohan Singh
INC

The 2004 Indian general election in Jharkhand was held for 14 seats in the state. It was the first election to be held after announcing Jharkhand as a separate state that was carved out from Bihar in November 2000. The 2005 election was the first one being conducted in Jharkhand.

== Schedule ==
The schedule of the election was announced by the Election Commission of India on 29 February 2004.

Poll event	Phase	
Poll event	1	2
Date of announcement	29 February 2004	
Notification date	24 March 2004	31 March 2004
Last date for filing nomination	31 March 2004	7 April 2004
Scrutiny of nomination	2 April 2004	8 April 2004
Last date for withdrawal of nomination	5 April 2004	10 April 2004
Date of poll	20 April 2004	26 April 2004
Date of counting of votes	13 May 2004	
No. of constituencies	6	8

== Parties and alliances ==
=== National Democratic Alliance ===
Party	Flag	Symbol	Leader	Seats contested
Bharatiya Janata Party			Babulal Marandi	14

=== United Progressive Alliance ===
Party	Flag	Symbol	Leader	Seats contested
Indian National Congress			Sushila Kerketta	6+3 (Note: Friendly Contest between JMM and INC in 2 Parliamentary Constituencies (PCs): Rajmahal (1) & Kodarma (5)) (Note: Friendly Contest between RJD and INC in Constituency Palamu (13))
Jharkhand Mukti Morcha			Shibu Soren	3+2
Rashtriya Janata Dal			Lalu Prasad Yadav	1+1
Communist Party of India			Bhubneshwar Prasad Mehta	1

== List of Candidates ==
Constituency		UPA		NDA	
#	Name	Party	Candidate	Party	Candidate
1	Rajmahal (ST)	JMM	Hemlal Murmu	BJP	Som Marandi
1	Rajmahal (ST)	INC	Thomas Hansda	BJP	Som Marandi
2	Dumka (ST)	JMM	Shibu Soren	BJP	Lal Hembrom
3	Godda	INC	Furkan Ansari	BJP	Pradeep Yadav
4	Chatra	RJD	Dhirendra Agarwal	BJP	Nagmani Kushwaha
5	Kodarma	JMM	Champa Verma	BJP	Babulal Marandi
5	Kodarma	INC	Tilakdhari Singh	BJP	Babulal Marandi
6	Giridih	JMM	Tek Lal Mahto	BJP	Ravindra Pandey
7	Dhanbad	INC	Chandra Shekhar Dubey	BJP	Rita Verma
8	Ranchi	INC	Subodh Kant Sahay	BJP	Ram Tahal Choudhary
9	Jamshedpur	JMM	Sunil Kumar Mahato	BJP	Abha Mahto
10	Singhbhum (ST)	INC	Bagun Sumbrai	BJP	Laxman Gilua
11	Khunti (ST)	INC	Sushila Kerketta	BJP	Kariya Munda
12	Lohardaga (ST)	INC	Rameshwar Oraon	BJP	Dukha Bhagat
13	Palamau (SC)	RJD	Manoj Kumar	BJP	Braj Mohan Ram
13	Palamau (SC)	INC	Vijay Kumar	BJP	Braj Mohan Ram
14	Hazaribagh	CPI	Bhubneshwar Mehta	BJP	Yashwant Sinha

== Results ==
Alliance/ Party		Popular vote			Seats		
Alliance/ Party		Votes	%	±pp	Contested	Won	+/−
UPA	INC	20,07,334	21.44	▼2.34	6 + 3	6	▲4
UPA	JMM	15,23,976	16.28	▲6.75	3 + 2	4	▲4
UPA	RJD	3,28,197	3.51	▼3.97	1 + 1	2	▲1
UPA	CPI	3,56,058	3.80	▲1.19	1	1	▲1
UPA	Total	42,15,565	45.03	Steady	11 + 6	13	Steady
NDA	BJP	30,90,365	33.01	▼12.52	14	1	▼10
JD(U)		3,56,106	3.80	Steady	5	0	Steady
BSP		2,19,247	2.34	▲1.35	14	0	Steady
CPI(M-L)L		2,02,343	2.16	▲1.20	8	0	Steady
AJSU		1,57,930	1.69	Steady	5	0	Steady
MCC		1,47,470	1.58	▼3.06	1	0	Steady
Others		3,27,640	3.50	Steady	47	0	Steady
IND		6,44,647	6.89	▲6.30	71	0	Steady
Total		93,61,313	100%	-	182	14	-

- NOTE: Changes in vote share and seat share are calculated using results from 14 constituencies in Bihar in the 1999 Indian general elections.

== List of elected members ==
Constituency		Winner				Runner Up				Margin	%
#	Name	Candidate	Party	Votes	%	Candidate	Party	Votes	%	Margin	%
1	Rajmahal (ST)	Hemlal Murmu	JMM	226,411	32.76	Thomas Hansda	INC	223,437	32.33	2,974	0.43
2	Dumka (ST)	Shibu Soren	JMM	339,542	54.32	Sone Lal Hembrom	BJP	224,527	35.92	115,015	18.40
3	Godda	Furqan Ansari	INC	373,138	44.88	Pradeep Yadav	BJP	346,384	41.66	26,754	3.22
4	Chatra	Dhirendra Agarwal	RJD	121,464	27.89	Inder Singh Namdhari	JD(U)	102,609	23.56	18,855	4.33
5	Kodarma	Babulal Marandi	BJP	366,656	44.40	Champa Verma	JMM	211,712	25.64	154,944	18.76
6	Giridih	Tek Lal Mahto	JMM	350,255	49.03	Ravindra Pandey	BJP	200,461	28.06	149,794	20.97
7	Dhanbad	Chandra Dubey	INC	355,499	37.76	Rita Verma	BJP	236,121	25.08	119,378	12.68
8	Ranchi	Subodh Kant Sahay	INC	284,035	40.82	Ram Tahal Choudhary	BJP	268,614	38.61	15,421	2.22
9	Jamshedpur	Sunil Kumar Mahato	JMM	396,056	51.00	Abha Mahto	BJP	290,423	37.40	105,633	13.60
10	Singhbhum (ST)	Bagun Sumbrai	INC	221,343	42.55	Laxman Gilua	BJP	162,147	31.17	59,196	11.38
11	Khunti (ST)	Sushila Kerketta	INC	218,158	44.45	Kariya Munda	BJP	166,932	34.01	51,226	10.44
12	Lohardaga (ST)	Rameshwar Oraon	INC	223,920	48.00	Dukha Bhagat	BJP	133,665	28.65	90,255	19.35
13	Palamau (SC)	Manoj Kumar	RJD	206,733	32.22	Braj Mohan Ram	BJP	151,589	23.63	55,144	8.60
14	Hazaribagh	Bhubneshwar Mehta	CPI	356,058	50.47	Yashwant Sinha	BJP	250,730	35.54	105,328	14.93

== Bye-elections ==
Constituency			Winner				Runner Up				Margin
No.	Name	Date	Candidate	Party	Votes	%	Candidate	Party	Votes	%	Margin
5	Koderma	December 2006	Babu Lal Marandi	IND	325,871	43.00	Manoj Kumar Yadav	INC	131,731	17.38	194,140
5	Koderma	December 2006	The Koderma Lok Sabha bypoll was held following the resignation of the incumbent MP, Babu Lal Marandi.								
13	Palamu (SC)	April 2007	Ghuran Ram	RJD	164,202	24.10	Kameshwar Baitha	BSP	141,875	20.83	22,327
13	Palamu (SC)	April 2007	The Palamu Lok Sabha bypoll was held following the cessation of membership of the incumbent MP, Manoj Kumar.								
9	Jamshedpur	August 29, 2007	Suman Mahato	JMM	293,003	45.71	Dinesh Kumar Sarangi	BJP	234,189	36.53	58,814
9	Jamshedpur	August 29, 2007	The Jamshedpur Lok Sabha bypoll was held following the death of the incumbent MP, Sunil Kumar Mehto.								

== Post-election Union Council of Ministers from Jharkhand ==
#	Name	Constituency	Designation	Department	From	To	Party
1	Shibu Soren	Dumka (Lok Sabha)	Cabinet Minister	Minister of Coal and Mines	23 May 2004	24 July 2004	JMM
1	Shibu Soren	Dumka (Lok Sabha)	Cabinet Minister	Minister of Coal	27 November 2004	2 March 2005	JMM
1	Shibu Soren	Dumka (Lok Sabha)	Cabinet Minister	Minister of Coal	29 January 2006	29 November 2006	JMM
2	Subodh Kant Sahay	Ranchi (Lok Sabha)	MoS (I/C)	Ministry of Food Processing Industries	23 May 2004	22 May 2009	INC
3	Rameshwar Oraon	Lohardaga (Lok Sabha)	MoS	Ministry of Tribal Affairs	6 April 2008	22 May 2009	INC

== Assembly Segment wise lead ==
Party	Assembly segments	Position in Assembly (as of 2005 election)
Indian National Congress	29	9
Jharkhand Mukti Morcha	22	17
Bharatiya Janata Party	16	30
Rashtriya Janata Dal	7	7
Communist Party of India	4	0
Janata Dal (United)	2	6
Others	1	12
Total	81	
