= 2009 Indian general election in Jharkhand =

Indian general election in Jharkhand, 2009
- April–May 2009

14 seats
- Turnout: 51.16%
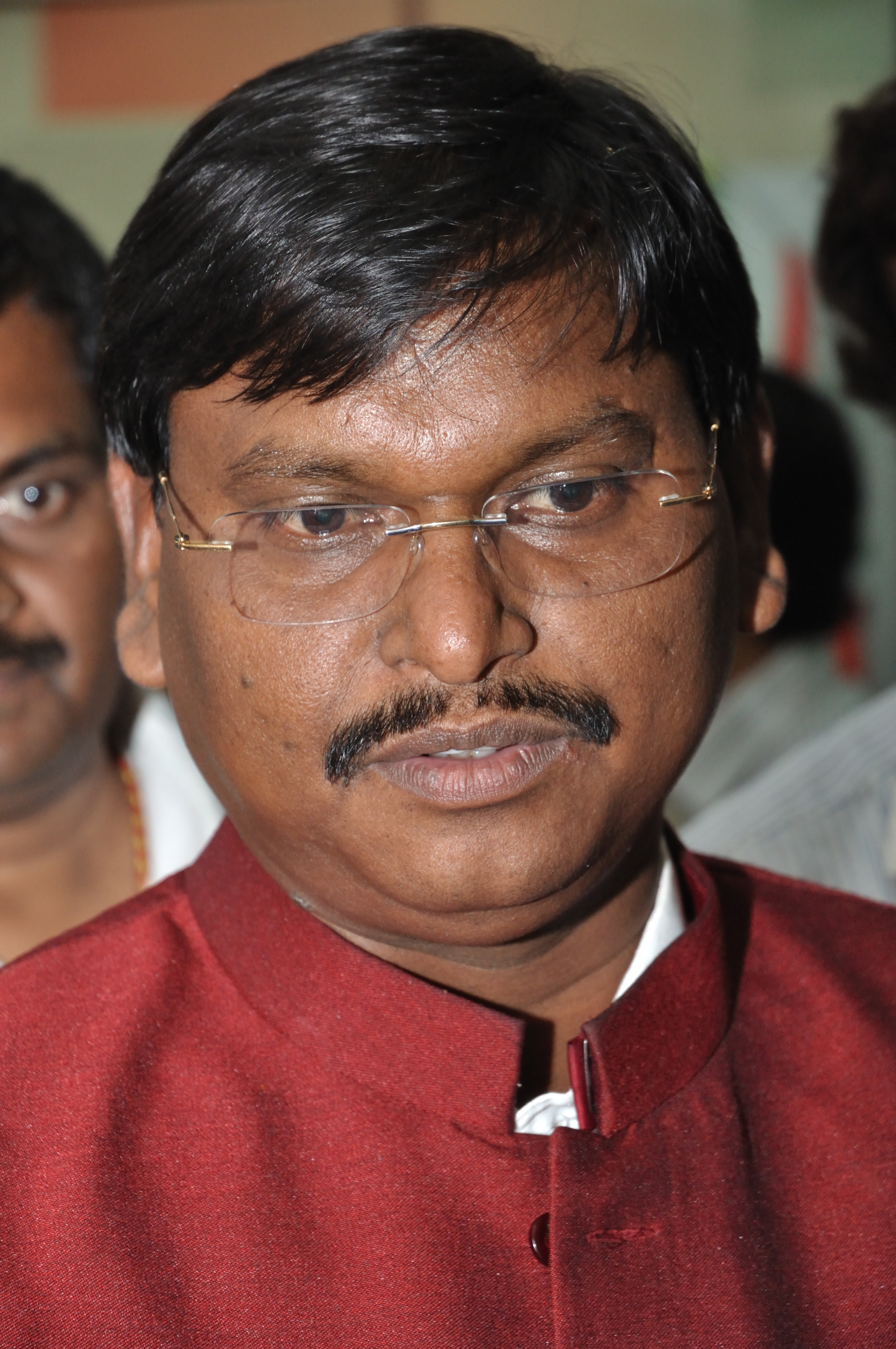

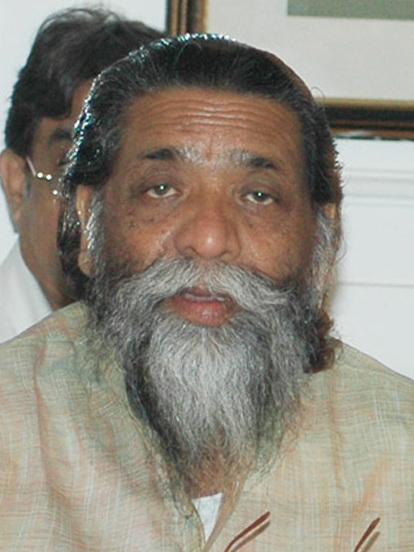
	First party	Second party
Leader	Arjun Munda	Shibu Soren
Party	BJP	JMM
Alliance	NDA	UPA
Leader's seat	Jamshedpur (won)	Dumka (won)
Last election	1	12
Seats won	8	3
Seat change	▲7	▼9
Percentage	28.74%	26.72%
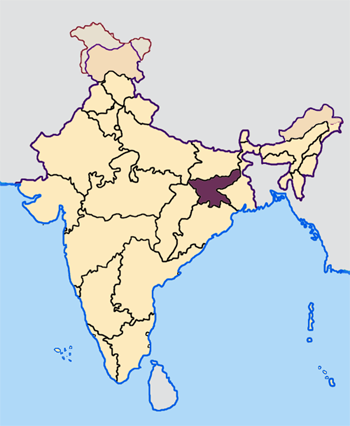
- Jharkhand
Prime Minister before election
Manmohan Singh
INC
Prime Minister after election
Manmohan Singh
INC

The 2009 Indian general election in Jharkhand was held for 14 seats in the state.

== Parties and alliances ==
=== National Democratic Alliance ===
Party	Flag	Symbol	Leader	Seats contested
Bharatiya Janata Party			Arjun Munda	12
Janata Dal (United)			Nitish Kumar	2
Total				14

=== United Progressive Alliance ===
Party	Flag	Symbol	Leader	Seats contested
Indian National Congress			Sonia Gandhi	6+3 (Note: Friendly Contest on Godda, Kodarma and Hazaribagh between INC and JMM.)
Jharkhand Mukti Morcha			Shibu Soren	5+3
Total				14+3

=== Other Parties ===
Party	Flag	Symbol	Leader	Seats contested
Jharkhand Vikas Morcha (Prajatantrik) (Note: Before Comb symbol JVM(P) stood under Cup and Saucer Symbol)			Babulal Marandi	14
Rashtriya Janata Dal			Lalu Prasad Yadav	6
All Jharkhand Students Union			Sudesh Mahato	6

== List of Candidates ==
Constituency		NDA		UPA		JVM(P)	
#	Name	Party	Candidate	Party	Candidate	Party	Candidate
1	Rajmahal	BJP	Devidhan Besra	JMM	Hemlal Murmu	JVM	Som Marandi
2	Dumka	BJP	Sunil Soren	JMM	Shibu Soren	JVM	Ramesh Hembrom
3	Godda	BJP	Nishikant Dubey	JMM	Durga Soren	JVM	Pradeep Yadav
3	Godda	BJP	Nishikant Dubey	INC	Furqan Ansari	JVM	Pradeep Yadav
4	Chatra	JD(U)	Arun Kumar Yadav	INC	Dhiraj Prasad Sahu	JVM	K. P. Sharma
5	Kodarma	BJP	Laxman Swarnkar	JMM	Bishnu Prasad Bhaiya	JVM	Babulal Marandi
5	Kodarma	BJP	Laxman Swarnkar	INC	Tilakdhari Singh	JVM	Babulal Marandi
6	Giridih	BJP	Ravindra Pandey	JMM	Tek Lal Mahto	JVM	Saba Ahmad
7	Dhanbad	BJP	Pashupati Nath Singh	INC	Chandrashekhar Dubey	JVM	Phul Chand Mandal
8	Ranchi	BJP	Ram Tahal Choudhary	INC	Subodh Kant Sahay	JVM	Akhtar Ansari
9	Jamshedpur	BJP	Arjun Munda	JMM	Suman Mahato	JVM	Arvind Kumar Singh
10	Singhbhum	BJP	Barkuwar Gagrai	INC	Bagun Sumbrai	JVM	Mangal Singh Bobonga
11	Khunti	BJP	Karia Munda	INC	Neil Tirkey	JVM	Theodore Kiro
12	Lohardaga	BJP	Sudarshan Bhagat	INC	Rameshwar Oraon	JVM	Bahura Ekka
13	Palamau	JD(U)	Radha Krishna Kishore	JMM	Kameshwar Baitha	JVM	Prabhat Kumar
14	Hazaribagh	BJP	Yashwant Sinha	JMM	Shivlal Mahto	JVM	Braj Kishore Jaiswal
14	Hazaribagh	BJP	Yashwant Sinha	INC	Saurabh Narain Singh	JVM	Braj Kishore Jaiswal

== Results ==
Alliance/ Party		Popular vote			Seats		
Alliance/ Party		Votes	%	±pp	Contested	Won	+/−
NDA	BJP	25,15,265	27.53	▼5.48	12	8	▲7
NDA	JD(U)	1,10,912	1.21	▼2.59	2	0	Steady
NDA	Total	26,26,177	28.74	Steady	14	8	Steady
UPA	INC	13,72,639	15.02	▼6.42	6 + 3	1	▼5
UPA	JMM	10,68,935	11.70	▼4.58	5 + 3	2	▼2
UPA	Total	24,41,574	26.72	Steady	11 + 6	3	Steady
JVM(P)		9,57,084	10.48	New	14	1	▲1
RJD		4,86,870	5.33	▲1.82	6	0	▼2
BSP		3,21,571	3.52	▲1.18	14	0	Steady
CPI(ML)L		2,54,455	2.79	▲0.63	6	0	Steady
AJSU		2,00,523	2.19	▲0.50	6	0	Steady
JKP		1,25,900	1.38	▲0.77	7	0	Steady
CPI		1,06,051	1.16	▼2.64	3	0	▼1
MCO		91,489	1.00	▼0.58	2	0	Steady
CPI(M)		49,407	0.54	▲0.14	2	0	Steady
JKP(N)		43,293	0.47	New	5	0	Steady
Others		4,15,325	4.55	Steady	53	0	Steady
IND		10,16,099	11.12	▲4.23	100	2	▲2
Total		91,35,818	100%	-	249	14	-

== List of Elected MPs ==
Constituency		Winner				Runner Up				Margin	%
#	Name	Candidate	Party	Votes	%	Candidate	Party	Votes	%	Margin	%
1	Rajmahal	Devidhan Besra	BJP	168,357	26.12	Hemlal Murmu	JMM	159,374	24.73	8,983	1.39
2	Dumka	Shibu Soren	JMM	208,518	33.52	Sunil Soren	BJP	189,706	30.50	18,812	3.02
3	Godda	Nishikant Dubey	BJP	189,526	23.76	Furkan Ansari	INC	183,119	22.96	6,407	0.80
4	Chatra	Inder Singh Namdhari	IND	108,336	22.86	Dhiraj Prasad Sahu	INC	92,158	19.44	16,178	3.42
5	Kodarma	Babulal Marandi	JVM	199,462	25.55	Raj Kumar Yadav	CPI(ML)	150,942	19.34	48,520	6.21
6	Giridih	Ravindra Kumar Pandey	BJP	233,435	37.70	Tek Lal Mahto	JMM	138,697	22.40	94,738	15.30
7	Dhanbad	Pashupati Nath Singh	BJP	260,521	32.03	Chandrashekhar Dubey	INC	202,474	24.89	58,047	7.14
8	Ranchi	Subodh Kant Sahay	INC	310,499	42.88	Ram Tahal Choudhary	BJP	297,149	41.04	13,350	1.84
9	Jamshedpur	Arjun Munda	BJP	319,620	45.30	Suman Mahato	JMM	199,957	28.34	119,663	16.96
10	Singhbhum	Madhu Kora	IND	256,827	44.29	Barkuwar Gagrai	BJP	167,154	28.82	89,673	15.47
11	Khunti	Karia Munda	BJP	210,214	41.19	Neil Tirkey	INC	130,039	25.48	80,175	15.71
12	Lohardaga	Sudarshan Bhagat	BJP	144,628	27.69	Chamra Linda	IND	136,345	26.10	8,283	1.59
13	Palamau	Kameshwar Baitha	JMM	167,995	25.80	Ghuran Ram	RJD	144,457	22.18	23,538	3.62
14	Hazaribagh	Yashwant Sinha	BJP	219,810	31.81	Saurabh Narain Singh	INC	179,646	26.00	40,164	5.81

=== Bye-election ===
Constituency			Winner				Runner Up				Margin
No.	Name	Date	Candidate	Party	Votes	%	Candidate	Party	Votes	%	Margin
9	Jamshedpur	2011	Dr. Ajoy Kumar	JVM(P)	276,582	37.38	Dineshanand Goswami	BJP	120,856	16.33	155,726
9	Jamshedpur	2011	The 2011 Jamshedpur Lok Sabha by-poll was held because the sitting MP, Arjun Munda, resigned from his seat to become Chief Minister of Jharkhand								

== Assembly Segment wise lead ==
Party	Assembly segments	Position in Assembly (as of 2009 election)
Bharatiya Janata Party	39	18
Indian National Congress	11	14
Jharkhand Mukti Morcha	8	18
Jharkhand Vikas Morcha (Prajatantrik)	6	11
Rashtriya Janata Dal	3	5
All Jharkhand Students Union	1	5
Communist Party of India (Marxist-Leninist) Liberation	2	1
Bahujan Samaj Party	2	0
Janata Dal (United)	1	2
Others	8	7
Total	81	
