= 1999 Indian general election in Bihar =

Elections in Indian state of Bihar

- 18 September–3 October

54 seats
- Turnout: 61.48%
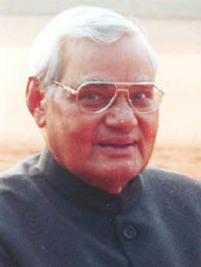

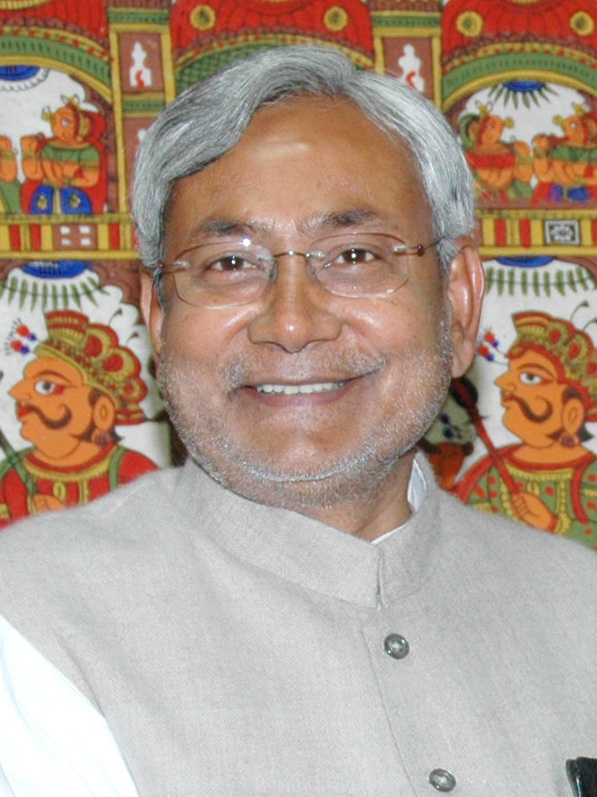

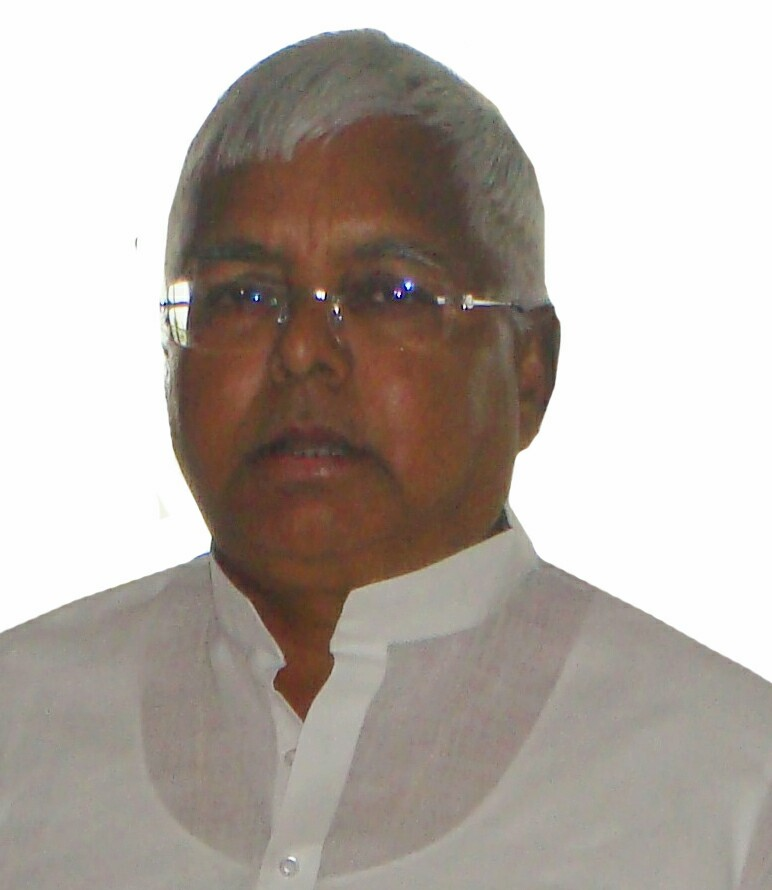

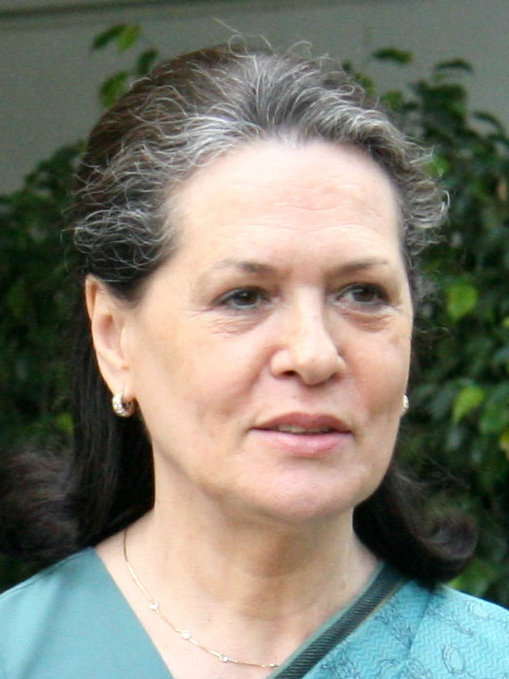
| | First party | Second party |
|---|---|---|
| Leader | Atal Bihari Vajpayee | Nitish Kumar |
| Party | BJP | SS |
| Alliance | NDA | NDA |
| Last election | 20 | Did not exist |
| Seats won | 23 | 18 |
| Seat change | ▲3 | ▲18 |
| Popular vote | 82,04,850 | 74,05,701 |
| Percentage | 23.01% | 20.77% |
| Swing | ▼1.02% | New |
| | Third party | Fourth party |
| Leader | Lalu Prasad Yadav | Sonia Gandhi |
| Party | JD | INC |
| Alliance | INC+ | INC+ |
| Last election | 17 | 5 |
| Seats won | 7 | 4 |
| Seat change | ▼10 | ▼1 |
| Popular vote | 1,00,85,302 | 31,42,603 |
| Percentage | 28.29% | 8.81% |
| Swing | ▲1.71% | ▲1.54% |
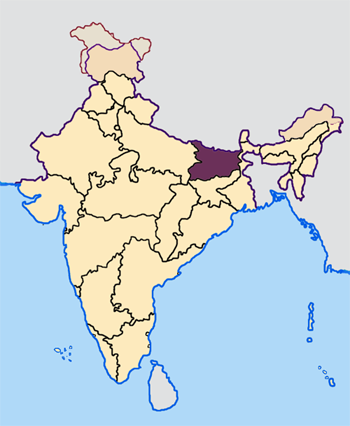
- Bihar
Prime Minister before election
Atal Bihari Vajpayee
BJP
Prime Minister after election
Atal Bihari Vajpayee
BJP

The 1999 Indian general election in Bihar were held for 54 seats with the state going to polls in the last three phases of the general elections. The major contenders in the state were the National Democratic Alliance (NDA) and Congress led alliance. NDA, an alliance formed in last election, consisted of the Bharatiya Janata Party (BJP) and Janata Dal (United) whereas the Congress led alliance was constituted of the Indian National Congress, Rashtriya Janata Dal (RJD), Communist Party of India (Marxist) (CPM), Communist Party of India and the Marxist Co-ordination Committee.

The results indicated the complete reversal of the last election, NDA secured landslide victory winning 41 out of 54 seats. Bihar emerged as most successful state for NDA, winning most seats in any state, leading to their huge victory under Vajpayee in the election.

The results were huge setbacks for Rashtriya Janata Dal (RJD) limiting their seats to just 7, even RJD Supremo Laloo Prasad Yadav lost his election from Madhepura constituency to Sharad Yadav of Janata Dal (United) in close fight by 30320 votes.

== Election schedule ==
The polling schedule for the 1999 General Elections was announced by the Chief Election Commissioner on 11 July 1999.

| Poll event | Phase | | |
|---|---|---|---|
| Poll event | III | IV | V |
| Notification date | 21 August | 30 August | 7 September |
| Last date for filing nomination | 28 August | 6 September | 14 September |
| Scrutiny of nomination | 30 August | 7 September | 15 September |
| Last Date for withdrawal of nomination | 1 September | 9 September | 17 September |
| Date of poll | 18 September | 25 September | 3 October |
| Date of counting of votes/Result | 6 October 1999 | | |
| No. of constituencies | 19 | 19 | 16 |

Voting Phases
| III (19 seats) | IV (19 seats) | V (16 seats) |
|---|---|---|
| Dumka; Godda; Sasaram; Bikramganj; Aurangabad; Jahanabad; Nawada; Gaya; Chatra; Kodaram; Giridh; Dhanbad; Hazaribagh; Ranchi; Jamshedpur; Singbhum; Khunti; Lohardagav; Palamau | Bagaha; Bettiah; Motihari; Gopalganj; Siwan; Maharajganj; Chapra; Hajipur; Vaishali; Muzaffarpur; Darbhanga; Barh; Balia; Munger; Begusarai; Nalanda; Patna; Arrah; Buxar | Sitamarhi; Sheohar; Madhubani; Jhanjharpur; Rosera; Samastipur; Saharsa; Madhepura; Araria; Kishanganj; Purnia; Katihar; Banka; Bhagalpur; Khagaria; Rajmahal |

== Parties and alliances ==
=== National Democratic Alliance ===
| Party | Flag | Symbol | Leader | Seats contested |
|---|---|---|---|---|
| Bharatiya Janata Party | | | Nand Kishore Yadav | 29 |
| Janata Dal (United) | | | Sharad Yadav | 23 |
| Bihar People's Party | | | Anand Mohan Singh | 2 |

=== Congress Alliance ===
| Party | Flag | Symbol | Leader | Seats contested |
|---|---|---|---|---|
| Rashtriya Janata Dal | | | Lalu Prasad Yadav | 35 + 1 (Note: Friendly Contest on Godda and Hazaribagh between INC and RJD.) |
| Indian National Congress | | | Sadanand Singh | 15 + 1 |
| Communist Party of India (Marxist) | | | Subodh Roy | 2 |
| Marxist Co-ordination Committee (Note: Book Symbol was an Independent symbol in 1999.) | | | A. K. Roy | 1 |
| Communist Party of India | | | Indrajit Gupta | 1 + 8 (Note: CPI Contested only Nalanda constituency under the alliance of INC and RJD.) |

== Candidates ==
| Constituency | | NDA | | UPA | |
| # | Name | Party | Candidate | Party | Candidate |
|---|---|---|---|---|---|
| 1 | Bagaha (SC) | JD(U) | Mahendra Baitha | RJD | Purnmasi Ram |
| 2 | Bettiah | BJP | Madan Prasad Jaiswal | RJD | Mataour Rahman |
| 2 | Bettiah | BJP | Madan Prasad Jaiswal | CPI | Triveni Tiwari |
| 3 | Motihari | BJP | Radha Mohan Singh | RJD | Rama Devi |
| 4 | Gopalganj | JD(U) | Raghunath Jha | RJD | Kali Prasad Pandey |
| 5 | Siwan | JD(U) | Akhlaq Ahmed | RJD | Mohammad Shahabuddin |
| 6 | Maharajganj | JD(U) | Prabhunath Singh | INC | Mahachandra Prasad Singh |
| 7 | Chapra | BJP | Rajiv Pratap Rudy | RJD | Hira Lal Rai |
| 8 | Hajipur (SC) | JD(U) | Ram Vilas Paswan | RJD | Ramai Ram |
| 9 | Vaishali | BPP | Lovely Anand | RJD | Raghuvansh Prasad Singh |
| 10 | Muzaffarpur | JD(U) | Jai Narain Prasad Nishad | RJD | Mahendra Sahni |
| 11 | Sitamarhi | JD(U) | Nawal Kishore Rai | RJD | Suryadeo Rai |
| 12 | Sheohar | BPP | Anand Mohan Singh | RJD | Md Anwarul Haque |
| 13 | Madhubani | BJP | Hukmdev Narayan Yadav | INC | Shakeel Ahmad |
| 13 | Madhubani | BJP | Hukmdev Narayan Yadav | CPI | Bhogendra Jha |
| 14 | Jhanjharpur | JD(U) | Devendra Prasad Yadav | RJD | Surendra Prasad Yadav |
| 15 | Darbhanga | BJP | Kirti Azad | RJD | Mohammad Ali Ashraf Fatmi |
| 16 | Rosera (SC) | JD(U) | Ram Chandra Paswan | RJD | Pitambar Paswan |
| 17 | Samastipur | JD(U) | Manjay Lal | RJD | Ashok Singh |
| 18 | Barh | JD(U) | Nitish Kumar | RJD | Vijay Krishna |
| 19 | Balia | JD(U) | Ramjivan Singh | RJD | Ashok Kumar |
| 19 | Balia | JD(U) | Ramjivan Singh | CPI | Shatrughan Prasad Singh |
| 20 | Saharsa | JD(U) | Dinesh Chandra Yadav | RJD | Surya Narayan Yadav |
| 21 | Madhepura | JD(U) | Sharad Yadav | RJD | Lalu Prasad |
| 22 | Araria (SC) | BJP | Parmanand Rishidev | RJD | Sukdeo Paswan |
| 23 | Kishanganj | BJP | Syed Shahnawaz Hussain | RJD | Taslimuddin |
| 24 | Purnea | BJP | Jai Krishna Mandal | CPI(M) | Abdul Khalil Ahmad |
| 25 | Katihar | BJP | Nikhil Kumar Choudhary | INC | Mubarak Hussain |
| 26 | Rajmahal (ST) | BJP | Som Marandi | INC | Thomas Hansda |
| 27 | Dumka (ST) | BJP | Babu Lal Marandi | INC | Ramesh Hembram |
| 28 | Godda | BJP | Jagadambi Prasad Yadav | RJD | Javed Iqbal Ansari |
| 28 | Godda | BJP | Jagadambi Prasad Yadav | INC | Furqan Ansari |
| 28 | Godda | BJP | Jagadambi Prasad Yadav | CPI | Sanjay Kumar |
| 29 | Banka | JD(U) | Digvijay Singh | RJD | Shakuni Choudhary |
| 30 | Bhagalpur | BJP | Prabhas Chandra Tiwari | CPI(M) | Subodh Ray |
| 31 | Khagaria | JD(U) | Renu Kumari | RJD | Nayana Rana |
| 31 | Khagaria | JD(U) | Renu Kumari | CPI | Satyanarayan Singh |
| 32 | Monghyr | JD(U) | Brahmanand Mandal | RJD | Bijoy Kumar Bijoy |
| 33 | Begusarai | JD(U) | Shyam Sundar Singh | INC | Rajo Singh |
| 34 | Nalanda | JD(U) | George Fernandes | CPI | Gaya Singh |
| 35 | Patna | BJP | C P Thakur | RJD | Ram Kripal Yadav |
| 36 | Arrah | JD(U) | H P Singh | RJD | Ram Prasad Kushwaha |
| 37 | Buxar | BJP | Lalmuni Chaubey | RJD | Shivanand Tiwary |
| 37 | Buxar | BJP | Lalmuni Chaubey | CPI | Tej Narayan Singh |
| 38 | Sasaram (SC) | BJP | Muni Lall | RJD | Ram Keshi Bharati |
| 39 | Bikramganj | JD(U) | Vashisht Narayan Singh | RJD | Kanti Singh |
| 40 | Aurangabad | JD(U) | Sushil Kumar Singh | INC | Shyama Singh |
| 41 | Jahanabad | JD(U) | Arun Kumar | RJD | Surendra Prasad Yadav |
| 42 | Nawada (SC) | BJP | Sanjay Paswan | RJD | Vijay Kumar Chaudhary |
| 43 | Gaya (SC) | BJP | Ramji Manjhi | RJD | Rajesh Kumar |
| 44 | Chatra | BJP | Dhirendra Agarwal | RJD | Nagmani |
| 45 | Kodarma | BJP | Rati Lal Prasad Verma | INC | Tilakdhari Singh |
| 46 | Giridih | BJP | Ravindra Kumar Pandey | INC | Rajendra Prasad Singh |
| 47 | Dhanbad | BJP | Rita Verma | MCC | A. K. Roy |
| 48 | Hazaribagh | BJP | Yashwant Sinha | RJD | Aklu Ram Mahto |
| 48 | Hazaribagh | BJP | Yashwant Sinha | INC | Ishwari Ram Paswan |
| 48 | Hazaribagh | BJP | Yashwant Sinha | CPI | Ramendra Kumar |
| 49 | Ranchi | BJP | Ram Tahal Choudhary | INC | K. K. Tewary |
| 50 | Jamshedpur | BJP | Abha Mahato | INC | Ghanashyam Mahato |
| 50 | Jamshedpur | BJP | Abha Mahato | CPI | Dulal Munshi |
| 51 | Singhbhum (ST) | BJP | Laxman Gilua | INC | Vijay Singh Soy |
| 52 | Khunti (ST) | BJP | Kariya Munda | INC | Sushila Kerketta |
| 53 | Lohardaga (ST) | BJP | Dukha Bhagat | INC | Indra Nath Bhagat |
| 54 | Palamu (SC) | BJP | Braj Mohan Ram | RJD | Jorawar Ram |

== Voting and results ==
| Alliance/ Party | | Popular vote | | | Seats | | |
| Alliance/ Party | | Votes | % | ±pp | Contested | Won | +/− |
|---|---|---|---|---|---|---|---|
| NDA | BJP | 82,04,850 | 23.01 | ▼1.02 | 29 | 23 | ▲3 |
| NDA | JD(U) | 74,05,701 | 20.77 | New | 23 | 18 | ▲18 |
| NDA | BPP | 6,07,810 | 1.70 | New | 2 | 0 | Steady |
| NDA | Total | 1,62,18,361 | 45.48 | Steady | 54 | 41 | Steady |
| RJD+ | RJD | 1,00,85,302 | 28.29 | ▲1.71 | 30 + 6 | 7 | ▼10 |
| RJD+ | INC | 31,42,603 | 8.81 | ▲1.54 | 12 + 4 | 4 | ▼1 |
| RJD+ | CPI(M) | 3,50,958 | 0.98 | ▲0.58 | 2 | 1 | ▲1 |
| RJD+ | CPI | 9,59,705 | 2.69 | ▼0.71 | 1 + 8 | 0 | Steady |
| RJD+ | MCC | 3,51,839 | 0.99 | ▲0.28 | 1 | 0 | Steady |
| RJD+ | Total | 1,48,90,407 | 41.76 | Steady | 46 + 18 | 12 | Steady |
| CPI(M-L)L | | 8,79,081 | 2.47 | ▲0.35 | 23 | 0 | Steady |
| JMM | | 7,27,510 | 2.04 | ▼0.41 | 13 | 0 | Steady |
| NCP | | 4,76,004 | 1.34 | New | 19 | 0 | Steady |
| BSP | | 3,38,049 | 0.95 | ▲0.42 | 30 | 0 | Steady |
| Others | | 6,40,534 | 1.80 | Steady | 107 | 0 | Steady |
| IND | | 14,82,483 | 4.16 | ▲2.19 | 187 | 1 | ▲1 |
| Total | | 3,56,52,429 | 100% | - | 497 | 54 | - |

== Constituency Wise Results ==
| Constituency | | Winner | | | | Runner Up | | | | Margin | % |
| # | Name | Candidate | Party | Votes | % | Candidate | Party | Votes | % | Margin | % |
|---|---|---|---|---|---|---|---|---|---|---|---|
| 1 | Bagaha (SC) | Mahendra Baitha | JD(U) | 261,498 | 45.86 | Purnmasi Ram | RJD | 206,747 | 36.25 | 54,751 | 9.61 |
| 2 | Bettiah | Madan Jaiswal | BJP | 343,027 | 49.78 | Mataour Rahman | RJD | 303,377 | 44.03 | 39,650 | 5.75 |
| 3 | Motihari | Radha Mohan Singh | BJP | 338,696 | 50.02 | Rama Devi | RJD | 317,026 | 46.82 | 21,670 | 3.20 |
| 4 | Gopalganj | Raghunath Jha | JD(U) | 365,107 | 49.22 | Kali Prasad Pandey | RJD | 328,983 | 44.35 | 36,124 | 4.87 |
| 5 | Siwan | M. Sahabuddin | RJD | 385,069 | 54.83 | Amarnath Yadav | CPI(ML) | 255,229 | 36.34 | 129,840 | 18.49 |
| 6 | Maharajganj | Prabhunath Singh | JD(U) | 398,475 | 57.15 | Mahachandra Ps. Singh | INC | 294,412 | 42.22 | 104,063 | 14.93 |
| 7 | Chapra | Rajiv Pratap Rudy | BJP | 390,477 | 50.71 | Hira Lal Rai | RJD | 346,924 | 45.05 | 43,553 | 5.66 |
| 8 | Hajipur (SC) | Ram Vilas Paswan | JD(U) | 434,609 | 55.75 | Ramai Ram | RJD | 329,105 | 42.21 | 105,504 | 13.54 |
| 9 | Vaishali | Raghuvansh Singh | RJD | 308,458 | 43.46 | Lovely Anand | BPP | 263,066 | 37.06 | 45,392 | 6.40 |
| 10 | Muzaffarpur | Jai Prasad Nishad | JD(U) | 363,820 | 50.56 | Mahendra Sahni | RJD | 303,100 | 42.12 | 60,720 | 8.44 |
| 11 | Sitamarhi | Nawal Kishore Rai | JD(U) | 410,557 | 55.28 | Suryadeo Rai | RJD | 309,300 | 41.64 | 101,257 | 13.64 |
| 12 | Sheohar | Md Anwarul Haque | RJD | 347,279 | 48.51 | Anand Mohan | BPP | 344,744 | 48.15 | 2,535 | 0.36 |
| 13 | Madhubani | Hukmdev Yadav | BJP | 328,616 | 46.48 | Shakil Ahmad | INC | 266,001 | 37.63 | 62,615 | 8.85 |
| 14 | Jhanjharpur | Devendra Ps. Yadav | JD(U) | 375,852 | 55.73 | Surendra Prasad Yadav | RJD | 248,038 | 36.78 | 127,814 | 18.95 |
| 15 | Darbhanga | Kirti Azad | BJP | 395,549 | 52.16 | Md Ali Ashraf Fatmi | RJD | 340,001 | 44.84 | 55,548 | 7.32 |
| 16 | Rosera (SC) | Ram Ch. Paswan | JD(U) | 420,564 | 58.11 | Pitambar Paswan | RJD | 277,648 | 38.36 | 142,916 | 19.75 |
| 17 | Samastipur | Manjay Lal | JD(U) | 368,776 | 46.62 | Ashok Singh | RJD | 356,088 | 45.02 | 12,688 | 1.60 |
| 18 | Barh | Nitish Kumar | JD(U) | 362,016 | 48.23 | Vijay Krishna | RJD | 360,681 | 48.05 | 1,335 | 0.18 |
| 19 | Balia | Ramjivan Singh | JD(U) | 169,443 | 33.93 | Ashok Kumar | RJD | 157,411 | 31.52 | 12,032 | 2.41 |
| 20 | Saharsa | Dinesh Chandra Yadav | JD(U) | 392,926 | 54.45 | Surya Narayan Yadav | RJD | 298,433 | 41.36 | 94,493 | 13.09 |
| 21 | Madhepura | Sharad Yadav | JD(U) | 328,761 | 50.70 | Lalu Prasad Yadav | RJD | 298,441 | 46.02 | 30,320 | 4.68 |
| 22 | Araria (SC) | Sukdeo Paswan | RJD | 308,579 | 48.32 | Parmanand Rishidev | BJP | 306,410 | 47.98 | 2,169 | 0.34 |
| 23 | Kishanganj | Shahnawaz Hussain | BJP | 258,035 | 35.96 | Taslimuddin | RJD | 249,387 | 34.75 | 8,648 | 1.21 |
| 24 | Purnea | Rajesh Ranjan | IND | 438,193 | 63.17 | Jay Krishna Mandal | BJP | 185,627 | 26.76 | 252,566 | 36.41 |
| 25 | Katihar | Nikhil Kumar Choudhary | BJP | 280,911 | 43.92 | Tariq Anwar | NCP | 144,059 | 22.52 | 136,852 | 21.40 |
| 26 | Rajmahal (ST) | Thomas Hansda | INC | 250,298 | 44.68 | Som Marandi | BJP | 188,199 | 33.59 | 62,099 | 11.09 |
| 27 | Dumka (ST) | Babulal Marandi | BJP | 201,141 | 36.87 | Rupi Soren Kisku | JMM | 196,493 | 36.02 | 4,648 | 0.85 |
| 28 | Godda | Jagdambi Prasad Yadav | BJP | 221,191 | 34.91 | Suraj Mandal | JMM | 141,299 | 22.30 | 79,892 | 12.61 |
| 29 | Banka | Digvijay Singh | JD(U) | 233,453 | 37.28 | Giridhari Yadav | IND | 212,045 | 33.86 | 21,408 | 3.42 |
| 30 | Bhagalpur | Subodh Roy | CPI(M) | 321,159 | 47.94 | Prabhas Tiwari | BJP | 275,619 | 41.15 | 45,540 | 6.79 |
| 31 | Khagaria | Renu Kumari | JD(U) | 293,412 | 44.29 | Nayana Rana | RJD | 261,590 | 39.49 | 31,822 | 4.80 |
| 32 | Monghyr | Brahmanand Mandal | JD(U) | 346,615 | 49.15 | Bijoy Kumar Bijoy | RJD | 324,800 | 46.05 | 21,815 | 3.10 |
| 33 | Begusarai | Rajo Singh | INC | 318,244 | 50.10 | Shyam Sundar Singh | JD(U) | 298,294 | 46.96 | 19,950 | 3.14 |
| 34 | Nalanda | George Fernandes | JD(U) | 464,458 | 53.29 | Gaya Singh | CPI | 358,637 | 41.15 | 105,821 | 12.14 |
| 35 | Patna | C. P. Thakur | BJP | 379,370 | 47.30 | Ram Kripal Yadav | RJD | 332,478 | 41.45 | 46,892 | 5.85 |
| 36 | Arrah | Ram Prasad Singh | RJD | 264,140 | 38.74 | H. P. Singh | JD(U) | 171,858 | 25.21 | 92,282 | 13.53 |
| 37 | Buxar | Lal Muni Choubey | BJP | 235,968 | 39.15 | Shivanand Tiwari | RJD | 224,362 | 37.22 | 11,606 | 1.93 |
| 38 | Sasaram (SC) | Muni Lall | BJP | 257,223 | 39.37 | Ram Keshi Bharati | RJD | 238,547 | 36.51 | 18,676 | 2.86 |
| 39 | Bikramganj | Kanti Singh | RJD | 346,259 | 47.12 | Vashisht Narayan Singh | JD(U) | 311,491 | 42.38 | 34,768 | 4.74 |
| 40 | Aurangabad | Shyama Singh | INC | 317,418 | 47.05 | Sushil Kumar Singh | JD(U) | 247,002 | 36.61 | 70,416 | 10.44 |
| 41 | Jahanabad | Arun Kumar | JD(U) | 333,332 | 42.99 | Surendra Prasad Yadav | RJD | 316,045 | 40.77 | 17,287 | 2.22 |
| 42 | Nawada (SC) | Sanjay Paswan | BJP | 453,943 | 53.38 | Vijay Kumar Choudhary | RJD | 369,858 | 43.49 | 84,085 | 9.89 |
| 43 | Gaya (SC) | Ramji Manjhi | BJP | 319,530 | 50.21 | Rajesh Kumar | RJD | 298,747 | 46.94 | 20,783 | 3.27 |
| 44 | Chatra | Nagmani | RJD | 219,783 | 52.73 | Dhirendra Agrawal | BJP | 164,684 | 39.51 | 55,099 | 13.22 |
| 45 | Kodarma | Tilakdhari Prasad Singh | INC | 273,808 | 46.02 | Ritlal Prasad Verma | BJP | 263,630 | 44.31 | 10,178 | 1.71 |
| 46 | Giridih | Ravindra Kumar Pandey | BJP | 248,454 | 46.70 | Rajendra Prasad Singh | INC | 228,630 | 42.97 | 19,824 | 3.73 |
| 47 | Dhanbad | Rita Verma | BJP | 366,065 | 48.07 | A. K. Roy | MCC | 351,839 | 46.21 | 14,226 | 1.86 |
| 48 | Hazaribagh | Yashwant Sinha | BJP | 283,956 | 47.98 | Akalu Ram Mahto | RJD | 101,314 | 17.12 | 182,642 | 30.86 |
| 49 | Ranchi | Ram Tahal Choudhary | BJP | 379,261 | 65.72 | K. K. Tewari | INC | 138,084 | 23.93 | 241,177 | 41.79 |
| 50 | Jamshedpur | Abha Mahato | BJP | 285,232 | 45.40 | Ghanashyam Mahato | INC | 163,744 | 26.06 | 121,488 | 19.34 |
| 51 | Singhbhum (ST) | Laxman Gilua | BJP | 231,237 | 49.04 | Vijay Singh Soy | INC | 148,926 | 31.59 | 82,311 | 17.45 |
| 52 | Khunti (ST) | Kariya Munda | BJP | 187,484 | 46.31 | Sushila Kerketta | INC | 161,222 | 39.82 | 26,262 | 6.49 |
| 53 | Lohardaga (ST) | Dukha Bhagat | BJP | 163,658 | 45.02 | Indra Nath Bhagat | INC | 159,835 | 43.97 | 3,823 | 1.05 |
| 54 | Palamu (SC) | Braj Mohan Ram | BJP | 271,657 | 53.37 | Jorawar Ram | RJD | 186,532 | 36.65 | 85,125 | 16.72 |

== Assembly Segment wise lead ==
| Party | Assembly segments | Position in Assembly (as of 2000 election) |
|---|---|---|
| Bharatiya Janata Party | 107 | 67 |
| Janata Dal (United) | 89 | 21 |
| Rashtriya Janata Dal | 70 | 124 |
| Indian National Congress | 23 | 23 |
| Jharkhand Mukti Morcha | 6 | 12 |
| Communist Party of India | 5 | 5 |
| Communist Party of India (Marxist) | 4 | 2 |
| Communist Party of India (Marxist-Leninist) Liberation | 3 | 6 |
| Marxist Co-ordination Committee | 3 | 1 |
| Bihar People's Party | 3 | 0 |
| Nationalist Congress Party | 2 | 0 |
| Others | 9 | 63 |
| Total | 324 | |

== Post-election Union Council of Ministers from Bihar (and Jharkhand) ==
=== Bihar ===
| # | Name | Constituency | Designation | Department | From | To | Party |
|---|---|---|---|---|---|---|---|
| 1 | George Fernandes | Nalanda | Cabinet Minister | Defence | 13 October 1999 | 16 March 2001 | SAP |
| 1 | George Fernandes | Nalanda | Cabinet Minister | Defence | 15 October 2001 | 22 May 2004 | JD(U) |
| 2 | Nitish Kumar | Barh | Cabinet Minister | Surface Transport | 13 October 1999 | 22 November 1999 | SAP |
| 2 | Nitish Kumar | Barh | Cabinet Minister | Agriculture | 22 November 1999 | 3 March 2001 | SAP |
| 2 | Nitish Kumar | Barh | Cabinet Minister | Agriculture | 27 May 2001 | 22 July 2001 | SAP |
| 2 | Nitish Kumar | Barh | Cabinet Minister | Railways | 20 March 2001 | 22 May 2004 | JD(U) |
| 3 | Ram Vilas Paswan | Hajipur (SC) | Cabinet Minister | Communications | 13 October 1999 | 1 September 2001 | LJP |
| 3 | Ram Vilas Paswan | Hajipur (SC) | Cabinet Minister | Coal | 1 September 2001 | 29 April 2002 | LJP |
| 3 | Ram Vilas Paswan | Hajipur (SC) | Cabinet Minister | Mines | 1 September 2001 | 29 April 2002 | LJP |
| 4 | Sharad Yadav | Madhepura | Cabinet Minister | Civil Aviation | 13 October 1999 | 1 September 2001 | SAP |
| 4 | Sharad Yadav | Madhepura | Cabinet Minister | Labour | 1 September 2001 | 1 July 2002 | SAP |
| 4 | Sharad Yadav | Madhepura | Cabinet Minister | Consumer Affairs, Food and Public Distribution | 1 July 2002 | 22 May 2004 | JD(U) |
| 5 | C. P. Thakur | Patna | Cabinet Minister | Water Resources | 22 November 1999 | 27 May 2000 | BJP |
| 5 | C. P. Thakur | Patna | Cabinet Minister | Health and Family Welfare | 27 May 2000 | 1 July 2002 | BJP |
| 5 | C. P. Thakur | Patna | Cabinet Minister | Small Scale Industries | 29 January 2003 | 22 May 2004 | BJP |
| 5 | C. P. Thakur | Patna | Cabinet Minister | Development of North Eastern Region | 29 January 2003 | 22 May 2004 | BJP |
| 6 | Shatrughan Sinha | Rajya Sabha (Bihar) | Cabinet Minister | Health and Family Welfare | 1 July 2002 | 29 January 2003 | BJP |
| 6 | Shatrughan Sinha | Rajya Sabha (Bihar) | Cabinet Minister | Shipping | 29 January 2003 | 22 May 2004 | BJP |
| 7 | Syed Shahnawaz Hussain | Kishanganj | MoS | Food Processing Industries | 13 October 1999 | 27 May 2000 | BJP |
| 7 | Syed Shahnawaz Hussain | Kishanganj | MoS | Youth Affairs and Sports | 27 May 2000 | 30 September 2000 | BJP |
| 7 | Syed Shahnawaz Hussain | Kishanganj | MoS | Human Resource Development | 30 September 2000 | 8 February 2001 | BJP |
| 7 | Syed Shahnawaz Hussain | Kishanganj | MoS (I/C) | Coal | 8 February 2001 | 1 September 2001 | BJP |
| 7 | Syed Shahnawaz Hussain | Kishanganj | Cabinet Minister | Civil Aviation | 1 September 2001 | 24 May 2003 | BJP |
| 7 | Syed Shahnawaz Hussain | Kishanganj | Cabinet Minister | Textiles | 24 May 2003 | 22 May 2004 | BJP |
| 8 | Rajiv Pratap Rudy | Chapra | MoS | Commerce and Industry | 1 September 2002 | 24 May 2003 | BJP |
| 8 | Rajiv Pratap Rudy | Chapra | MoS (I/C) | Civil Aviation | 24 May 2003 | 22 May 2004 | BJP |
| 9 | Digvijay Singh | Banka | MoS | Railways | 13 October 1999 | 22 July 2001 | SAP |
| 9 | Digvijay Singh | Banka | MoS | Commerce and Industry | 22 July 2001 | 1 September 2001 | BJP |
| 9 | Digvijay Singh | Banka | MoS | Railways | 1 August 2001 | 1 July 2002 | SAP |
| 9 | Digvijay Singh | Banka | MoS | External Affairs | 1 July 2002 | 22 May 2004 | JD(U) |
| 10 | Muni Lall | Sasaram (SC) | MoS | Labour | 13 October 1999 | 1 July 2002 | BJP |
| 11 | Hukmdev Narayan Yadav | Madhubani | MoS | Agriculture | 13 October 1999 | 27 May 2000 | BJP |
| 11 | Hukmdev Narayan Yadav | Madhubani | MoS | Surface Transport | 27 May 2000 | 2 November 2001 | BJP |
| 11 | Hukmdev Narayan Yadav | Madhubani | MoS | Shipping | 7 November 2000 | 2 November 2001 | BJP |
| 11 | Hukmdev Narayan Yadav | Madhubani | MoS | Agriculture | 2 November 2001 | 22 May 2004 | BJP |
| 12 | Ravi Shankar Prasad | Rajya Sabha (Bihar) | MoS | Mines | 1 September 2001 | 29 January 2003 | BJP |
| 12 | Ravi Shankar Prasad | Rajya Sabha (Bihar) | MoS | Coal | 1 September 2001 | 29 January 2003 | BJP |
| 12 | Ravi Shankar Prasad | Rajya Sabha (Bihar) | MoS | Law and Justice | 1 July 2002 | 29 January 2003 | BJP |
| 12 | Ravi Shankar Prasad | Rajya Sabha (Bihar) | MoS (I/C) | Information and Broadcasting | 29 January 2003 | 22 May 2004 | BJP |
| 13 | Sanjay Paswan | Nawada (SC) | MoS | Communications and Information Technology | 1 July 2002 | 29 January 2003 | BJP |
| 13 | Sanjay Paswan | Nawada (SC) | MoS | Social Justice and Empowerment | 29 January 2003 | 24 May 2003 | BJP |
| 13 | Sanjay Paswan | Nawada (SC) | MoS | Human Resource Development | 24 May 2003 | 22 May 2004 | BJP |
| 14 | Nikhil Kumar Choudhary | Katihar | MoS | Agro and Rural Industries | 1 July 2002 | 29 January 2003 | BJP |

=== Jharkhand ===
| # | Name | Constituency | Designation | Department | From | To | Party |
|---|---|---|---|---|---|---|---|
| 1 | Yashwant Sinha | Hazaribagh | Cabinet Minister | Finance | 13 October 1999 | 1 July 2002 | BJP |
| 1 | Yashwant Sinha | Hazaribagh | Cabinet Minister | External Affairs | 1 July 2002 | 22 May 2004 | BJP |
| 2 | Kariya Munda | Khunti (ST) | Cabinet Minister | Agro and Rural Industries | 1 September 2001 | 29 January 2003 | BJP |
| 2 | Kariya Munda | Khunti (ST) | Cabinet Minister | Coal | 29 January 2003 | 9 January 2004 | BJP |
| 2 | Kariya Munda | Khunti (ST) | Cabinet Minister | Non-Conventional Energy Sources | 9 January 2004 | 22 May 2004 | BJP |
| 3 | Babulal Marandi | Dumka (ST) | MoS | Environment and Forests | 13 October 1999 | 7 November 2000 | BJP |
| 4 | Rita Verma | Dhanbad | MoS | Mines and Minerals | 13 October 1999 | 30 September 2000 | BJP |
| 4 | Rita Verma | Dhanbad | MoS | Health and Family Welfare | 27 May 2000 | 30 September 2000 | BJP |
| 4 | Rita Verma | Dhanbad | MoS | Rural Development | 30 September 2000 | 1 September 2001 | BJP |
| 4 | Rita Verma | Dhanbad | MoS | Human Resource Development | 1 September 2001 | 29 January 2003 | BJP |
| 5 | Nagmani | Chatra | MoS | Social Justice and Empowerment | 24 May 2003 | 22 May 2004 | BJP |

- NOTE: Babulal Marandi: Resigned in November 2000 to become the first Chief Minister of Jharkhand.
