= Elections in Jharkhand =

Electoral mechanism in Jharkhand

Elections in Jharkhand are being conducted since the formation of the state in 2000, to elect the members of Jharkhand Vidhan Sabha and to the members of the lower house of the Indian parliament, the Lok Sabha. There are 81 Vidhan Sabha constituencies and 14 Lok Sabha constituencies in the state.

Logo of the Election Commission of India

== Major Political parties in Jharkhand ==
The Bharatiya Janata Party and Jharkhand Mukti Morcha have been the most dominant parties in the state since its formation. Other major parties include Indian National Congress, Rashtriya Janata Dal, Communist Party of India (Marxist–Leninist) Liberation, Janata Dal (United) and All Jharkhand Students Union.

== Lok Sabha elections ==
Until the year 2000, Jharkhand was a part of undivided Bihar state.

Total Seats- 14

Year	1st Party	2nd Party	3rd Party	Others
2004	INC 6	JMM 4	RJD 2	BJP 1
2004	INC 6	JMM 4	RJD 2	CPI 1
2009	BJP 8	JMM 2	INC 1	JVM 1
2009	BJP 8	JMM 2	INC 1	Ind 2
2014	BJP 12	JMM 2		
2019	BJP 11	AJSU 1	INC 1	JMM 1
2024	BJP 8	JMM 3	INC 2	AJSU 1

== Vidhan Sabha elections ==
=== 2024 ===
Chief Minister: Hemant Soren (JMM)

Party	Seats			Popular vote	
Party	Contested	Won	+/−	%	± pp
Jharkhand Mukti Morcha	43	34	▲4	23.44%	▲4.72%
Indian National Congress	30	16	Steady	15.56%	▲1.68%
Rashtriya Janata Dal	7	4	▲3	3.44%	▲0.69%
Communist Party of India (M-L) L	4	2	▲1	1.89%	▲0.74%
Total	81	56	▲8	44.33%	▲8.98%
Bharatiya Janata Party	68	21	▼4	33.18%	▼0.19%
All Jharkhand Students Union	10	1	▼1	3.54%	▼4.56%
Janata Dal (United)	2	1	▲1	0.81%	▲0.07%
Lok Janshakti Party (RV)	1	1	▲1	0.61%	New
Total	81	24	▼3	38.14%	▼4.68%
Jharkhand Loktantrik Krantikari Morcha	68	1	▲1	6.20%	New
Total		81			

=== 2019 ===
Chief Minister(s): Hemant Soren (JMM), Champai Soren (JMM)

Party	Seats			Popular vote	
Party	Contested	Won	+/−	%	± pp
Jharkhand Mukti Morcha	43	30	▲11	18.72%	▼1.71%
Indian National Congress	31	16	▲10	13.88%	▲3.42%
Rashtriya Janata Dal	7	1	▲1	2.75%	▼0.38%
Total	81	47	▲22	35.35%	▲1.33%
Bharatiya Janata Party	79	25	▼12	33.37%	▲2.11%
Jharkhand Vikas Morcha	81	3	▼5	5.45%	▼4.54%
All Jharkhand Students Union	53	2	▼3	8.10%	▲4.42%
Communist Party of India (M-L) L	14	1	Steady	1.15%	▼0.37%
Nationalist Congress Party	7	1	▲1	0.42%	New
Independents		2	▲2	6.55%	▼0.14%
Total		81			

=== 2014 ===
Chief Minister: Raghubar Das (BJP)

Party	Seats			Popular vote	
Party	Contested	Won	+/−	%	± pp
Bharatiya Janata Party	72	37	▲19	31.26%	▲11.08%
All Jharkhand Students Union	8	5	Steady	3.68%	▼1.44%
Total	80	42	▲19	34.94%	▲9.64%
Jharkhand Mukti Morcha	79	19	▲1	20.43%	▲5.23%
Jharkhand Vikas Morcha	73	8	▼3	9.99%	▲1.00%
Indian National Congress	62	6	▼8	10.46%	▼5.7%
Bahujan Samaj Party	61	1	▲1	1.82%	
Communist Party of India (M-L) L	39	1	Steady	1.52%	
Jharkhand Party	19	1	Steady	1.11%	
Marxist Co-ordination Committee	13	1	Steady	1.02%	
Jai Bharat Samanta Party	19	1	Steady	0.79%	
Nav Jawan Sangharsh Morcha	9	1	▲1	0.49%	
Total		81			

=== 2009 ===
Chief Minister: Shibu Soren (JMM), Arjun Munda (BJP), Hemant Soren (JMM)

Party	Seats			Popular vote	
Party	Contested	Won	+/−	%	± pp
Bharatiya Janata Party	67	18	▼12	20.18%	▼3.39%
Jharkhand Mukti Morcha	78	18	▲1	15.20%	▲0.91%
Indian National Congress	61	14	▲5	16.16%	▲4.11%
Jharkhand Vikas Morcha	25	11	New	8.99%	New
All Jharkhand Students Union	54	5	▲3	5.12%	
Rashtriya Janata Dal	56	5	▼2	5.03%	
Janata Dal (United)	14	2	▼4	2.78%	
Communist Party of India (M-L) L	33	1	Steady	2.35%	
Jharkhand Party	41	1	Steady	1.10%	
Marxist Co-ordination Committee	6	1	▲1	1.09%	
Jai Bharat Samanta Party	9	1	▲1	0.91%	
Jharkhand Janadhikar Manch	9	1	▲1	0.72%%	
Rashtriya Kalyan Paksha	3	1	▲1	0.70%	
Independents	647	2	▼1	10.61%	
Total		81			

=== 2005 ===
Chief Minister: Shibu Soren (JMM), Arjun Munda (BJP), Madhu Koda (Independent)

Party	Seats			Popular vote	
Party	Contested	Won	+/−	%	± pp
Bharatiya Janata Party	63	30	▼2	23.57%	
Jharkhand Mukti Morcha	49	17	▲5	14.29%	
Indian National Congress	41	9	▼2	12.05%	
Rashtriya Janata Dal	51	7	▼2	8.48%	
Janata Dal (United)	18	6	▲3	4.00%	
All Jharkhand Students Union	40	2		2.81%	
United Goans Democratic Party	22	2	Steady	1.52%	
All India Forward Bloc	12	2		1.00%	
Communist Party of India (M-L) L	28	1	Steady	2.46%	
Jharkhand Party	27	1		0.97%	
National Congress Party	13	1		0.43%	
Independents	662	3	▲1	15.31%	
Total		81			

=== 2000* ===
Chief Minister: Babulal Marandi (BJP), Arjun Munda (BJP)

Party	Seats
Bharatiya Janata Party	32
Jharkhand Mukti Morcha	12
Indian National Congress	11
Rashtriya Janata Dal	9
Samata Party	5
Janata Dal (United)	3
Communist Party of India	3
United Goans Democratic Party	2
Communist Party of India (M-L) L	1
Marxist Co-ordination Committee	1
Independent	2
Total	81

- The First assembly of Jharkhand was constituted on the basis of the Bihar state legislative assembly elections held in February, 2000.
