= Jorawar Ram =

Indian politician

Member of Parliament, Lok Sabha
- In office 1989-1991
- Preceded by: Kamla Kumari
- Succeeded by: Ram Deo Ram
- Constituency: Palamu

Personal details
- Born: 25 March 1943 Daltonganj, Palamu, Bihar, British India
- Died: 4 May 2021 (aged 78)
- Party: Janata Dal
- Other political affiliations: Janata Dal (U)
- Spouse: Saraswati Devi

Jorawar Ram (25 March 1943 – 4 May 2021) was an Indian politician.

== Early life ==
Jorawar Ram born to Ram Gobind Ram at Palamu, Bihar in a Dusadh family.

He studied at Ganesh Lal Agarwal College, Palamu, Bihar (now Jharkhand).

His elder son, Rakesh Paswan is central member of JMM and younger son, Rajesh Roshan is Palamu District Vice-President of RJD Youth.

== Political career ==
He served as the District Secretary of Socialist Party - Bihar unit in 1967–1977 and District President of Lok Dal - Bihar in 1980–1988.

He was a Member of the Bihar Legislative Assembly (now Jharkhand Vidhan Sabha Assembly) from Chhatarpur constituency and also served as a Minister during his term in office.

Ram was elected to the Lok Sabha, lower house of the Parliament of India from Palamu as a member of the Janata Dal. He also fought in 2019 Lok Sabha elections as an independent candidate but lost to Vishnu Dayal Ram.

Ram died from COVID-19 in 2021 during the COVID-19 pandemic in India.
