= Gajendra Prasad Sinha =

Indian politician

Member of Parliament, Lok Sabha
- In office 1952–1962
- Preceded by: NA
- Succeeded by: Shashank Manjari
- Constituency: Palamu, Bihar

Personal details
- Born: 16 March 1919 Palamu
- Died: Palamu
- Party: Indian National Congress
- Spouse: Lalita Sinha
- Children: 2

Gajendra Prasad Sinha (born 19 March 1919, date of death unknown) was an Indian politician. He was elected to the Lok Sabha, the lower house of the Parliament of India from Palamu, Bihar as a member of the Indian National Congress.
