= Vishnu Dayal Ram =

Indian politician and former DGP, Jharkhand Police

Member of parliament, Lok Sabha
- Incumbent
- Assumed office 16 May 2014
- Preceded by: Kameshwar Baitha
- Constituency: Palamu

Personal details
- Born: 23 July 1951 (age 75) Nainijor, Buxar, Bihar
- Party: Bharatiya Janata Party
- Spouse: Smt. Pushpa Dayal
- Children: 3
- Education: Netarhat Vidyalaya and Patna College
- Occupation: Civil Servant
- As of 15 December, 2016

Vishnu Dayal Ram (Hindi pronunciation: [ʋɪʂɳʊ dəjaːl ɾaːm]) is a former director general police of Jharkhand state in India. He is a 1973 batch IPS officer and had served as DGP of Jharkhand Police twice from 1 July 2005 to 27 September 2006 and from 4 August 2007 to 13 January 2010. He has earlier served as SP of Bhagalpur and SSP of Patna. After retirement, he joined Bharatiya Janata Party and won the 2014 Lok Sabha election from Palamu (Lok Sabha constituency). Vishnu Dayal Ram of BJP registered a hat-trick on the Palamu Lok Sabha seat by registering a win against RJD's Mamta Bhuinya by a record margin of 288,807 votes in the 2024 Lok Sabha election.

He's the chief accused of 1980 Bhagalpur blindings, also called Operation 𝘎𝘢𝘯𝘨𝘢𝘫𝘢𝘭 , an operation conducted by Bhagalpur Police from 1979 to 1980 , in order to stop the rising criminal cases in the district. But later revelations proved that the operation included detaining anyone on the basis of doubt, and attacking their eyes with a big needle, called 𝘚𝘶𝘷𝘢 in the local language and then throwing acid on their eyes by the help of a syringe, which the police called 𝘎𝘢𝘯𝘨𝘢𝘫𝘢𝘭 (Ganga's water). The operation has 33 registered victims till date. Being the SP of Bhagalpur Police, Ram is accused of crimes against Humanity by human rights activists.
