= Ghuran Ram =

Indian politician

Member of Parliament, Lok Sabha
- In office 11 May 2006 — 16 May 2009
- Preceded by: Manoj Kumar
- Succeeded by: Kameshwar Baitha
- Constituency: Palamu, jharkhand

Personal details
- Born: 11 January 1970 (age 56) Mahulia Garhwa, jharkhand
- Party: Rashtriya Janata Dal
- Spouse: Rukimini Devi

Ghuran Ram is an Indian politician. He was elected to the Lok Sabha, lower house of the Parliament of India from Palamu, Jharkhand as a member of the Rashtriya Janata Dal in a bye election.
