= Kamla Kumari =

Indian politician (1937–2018)

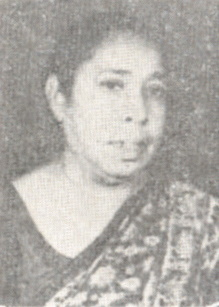

Member of Parliament, Lok Sabha
- In office 1967–1977, 1980–1989
- Constituency: Palamu, Bihar

Personal details
- Born: 14 January 1937 Ranchi, Bihar, British India
- Died: 2018 (aged 80–81)
- Party: Indian National Congress

Kamla Kumari (14 January 1937 – 2018) was an Indian politician. She was elected to the Lok Sabha, lower house of the Parliament of India from Palamu, Bihar as a member of the Indian National Congress. Kumari died in 2018.
