= Braj Mohan Ram =

Indian politician and Governor of Odisha

Governor of Odisha
- Incumbent
- Assumed office 12 October 2026
- Preceded by: Hari Babu Kambhampati

Member of the Lok Sabha
- In office 10 October 1999 – 6 February 2004
- Preceded by: Braj Mohan Ram
- Succeeded by: Manoj Kumar
- Constituency: Palamu

Member of the Lok Sabha
- In office 10 March 1998 – 26 April 1999
- Preceded by: Braj Mohan Ram
- Succeeded by: Braj Mohan Ram
- Constituency: Palamu

Member of the Lok Sabha
- In office 15 May 1996 – 4 December 1997
- Preceded by: Ram Deo Ram
- Succeeded by: Braj Mohan Ram
- Constituency: Palamu

Member of the Bihar Legislative Assembly
- In office 1991–1995
- Constituency: Latehar

Personal details
- Born: January 1, 1958 (age 68) Chandwa, Palamu, Bihar (now in Jharkhand), India
- Party: Bharatiya Janata Party
- Parent(s): Arjun Ram Baitha (father); Chaiti Devi (mother)
- Education: Bachelor of Arts (B.A.); B.S. College, Lohardaga (Ranchi University)
- Occupation: Politician, agriculturist

Braj Mohan Ram (born 1 January 1958) is an Indian politician and organizational leader who serves as the Governor of Odisha since October 2026. A member of the Bharatiya Janata Party (BJP), he previously served three consecutive terms as a Member of Parliament (MP) in the Lok Sabha representing the Palamu constituency from 1996 to 2004. Prior to his parliamentary career, he was a Member of the Legislative Assembly (MLA ) in the Bihar Legislative Assembly from the Latehar seat between 1991 and 1995.

== Life and career ==
Ram was a member of the Lok Sabha from 1996 to 2004 from the Palamu constituency in Palamau, Jharkhand. He was elected to Bihar Legislative Assembly from 1991 to 1995.
