= Anand Mohan =

Indian scientist (born 1957)

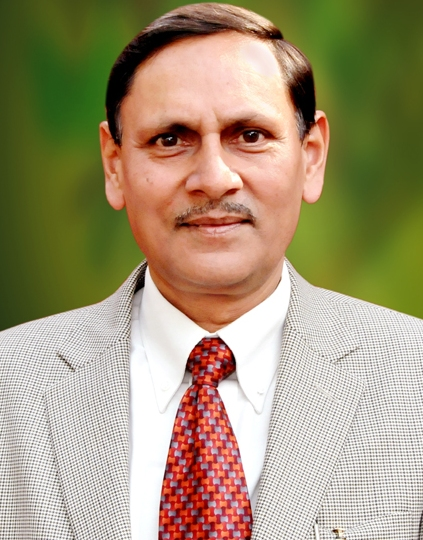
- Born: 29 September 1957 (age 68); Dharamsala, Himachal Pradesh, India
- Education: Banaras Hindu University
- Scientific career
- Fields: Geology, petrology
- Workplaces: Dayalbagh Educational Institute, Agra
- Doctoral advisor: R.K. Lal

Anand Mohan (born 29 September 1957) is registrar of Dayalbagh Educational Institute, Agra (India) and former professor at Department of Geology, Banaras Hindu University. He is a scientist in the field of geology, petrology and mineralogy. He is a member of XII Five Year Plan (2012–2017) of Planning Commission sub-committee on "Strengthening Community Engagement in Higher Education Institutions". He is also expert reviewer for earth sciences at Union Public Service Commission, India. He is Fellow of Indian Academy of Sciences, India (FASc) and National Academy of Sciences, India (FNASc).

== Education and personal life ==
Mohan did his B.Sc. (Hons) in year 1976 and Ph.D. (metamorphic petrology) in year 1983 from Banaras Hindu University. After the completion of his Ph.D., he joined University Grants Commission (India) as Research Scientist "A" (1984–86) and then joined Department of Geology, Banaras Hindu University as a faculty in year 1986. Mohan visited University of Leicester (UK) for his postdoctoral research on Leverhulme Commonwealth Fellowship.

Mohan and his wife Roop Rani, a teacher by profession, have two children in their family; daughter Kanika, a dental surgeon by profession is married to Dr Anurag Kumar and settled at Varanasi while the son Hans Mohan, Electrical Engineer by education, is serving for Headstrong (company) (a Genpact capital market Company) at Noida.

== Professional life ==
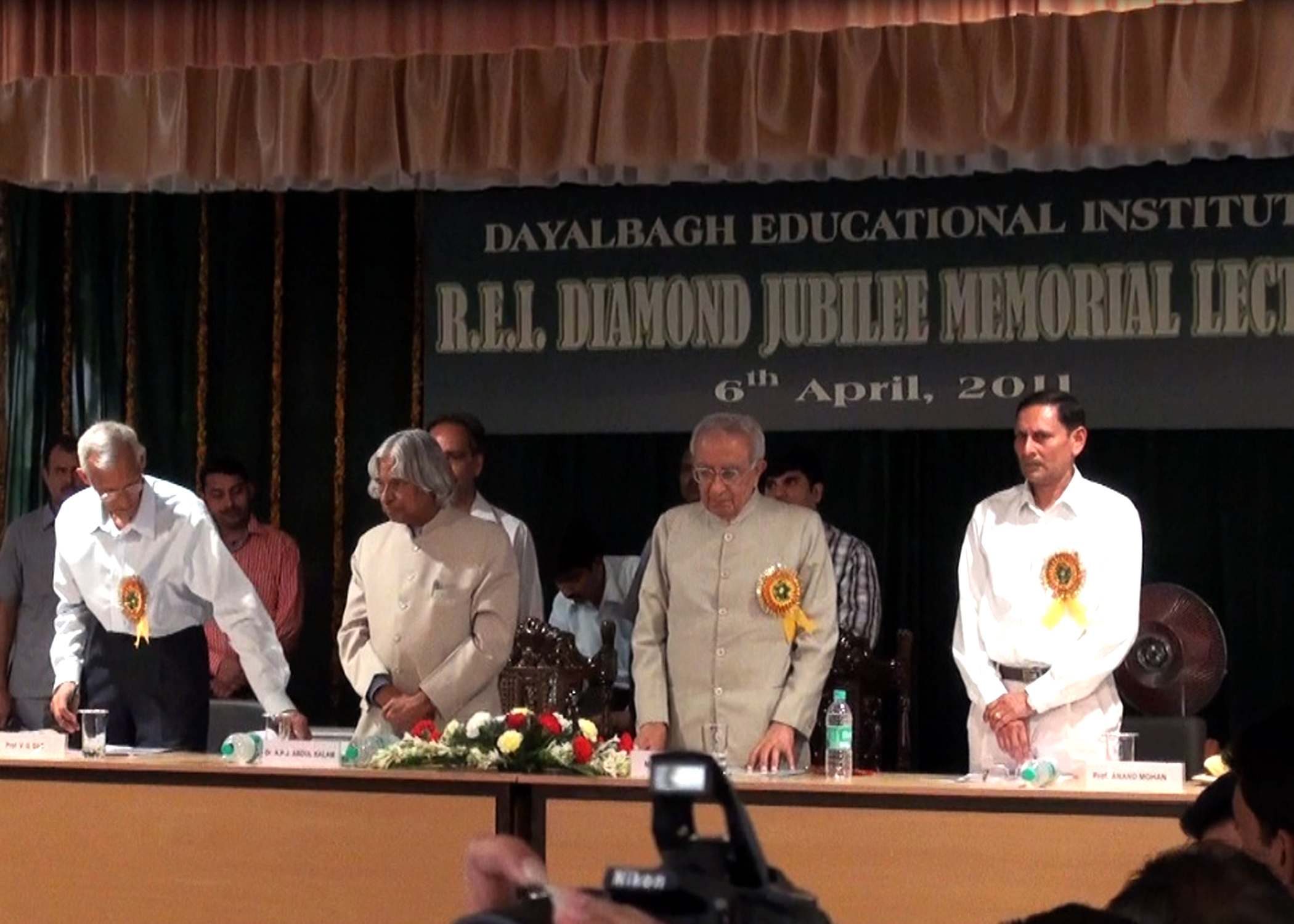
Mohan sharing the dais with (L to R) V. G. Das (Director, DEI), A. P. J. Abdul Kalam and Prem Kumar, IAS (President, DEI) during a programme at DEI, Agra.

Mohan is serving as Registrar in honorary capacity of Dayalbagh Educational Institute, Agra and he teaches graduate and postgraduate courses on "Disaster management and mitigation" to BBA and MBA students. He has served as Professor at Department of Geology, Banaras Hindu University. He is one of the two expert members for the Advisory Committee of the Centre on "Institute of Integrated Himalayan Studies" at Himachal University. He is subject expert for the course "Crystallography and Mineralogy" of e-PG Pathsala, an initiative of Ministry of Human Resource Development (India) and University Grants Commission (India).

== Publications ==
Mohan has published more than 60 peer-reviewed journal articles and several papers have received extensive citations in science community. He has also authored few books including "Milestones in Petrology and Future Perspectives", "Concept of Eco-Village/City as Role Model for Sustainable Environment and Development", "Spiritual Consciousness", "Consumption Levels, Environmental damage and Sustainable Settlements" and "Climate Change, Water Management and concept of Eco-village/Eco-city". The later project has widespread implication to make the city of Taj Mahal, Agra, an eco-city.

== Awards and recognitions ==
Mohan has received a number of awards, medals and prizes from the science community.

- Fellow, Indian Academy of Sciences (FASc).
- Fellow, National Academy of Sciences, India (FNASc).
- National Mineral Award, Ministry of Steel & Mines, Government of India (year 1997).
- INSA (Indian National Science Academy) Medal for Young Scientist for outstanding work on P-T characterization of granulites of South India (year 1989).
- M.K. Ray Memorial Medal for Best Paper by Geological, Mining & Metallurgical Society of India.
- M.R. Srinivasa Rao Award of Geological Society of India.
- Career Award of University Grants Commission (India).
