= Manoj Kumar (Jharkhand politician) =

Indian politician

MP
- Constituency: Palamau

Personal details
- Born: 15 June 1964 (age 61) Palamau, Jharkhand
- Party: RJD
- Spouse: Pushpa Devi
- Children: 3 sons and 2 daughters
- As of 25 September, 2006

Manoj Kumar (born 15 June 1964) was a member of the 14th Lok Sabha of India. He represented the Palamau constituency of Jharkhand and is a member of the Rashtriya Janata Dal (RJD) political party.

He was expelled from the Lok Sabha in December 2005, following allegations of improper conduct. An investigation showed that Kumar and 10 other Members of Parliament had accepted money in exchange for raising certain questions in parliament, and all eleven MPs were expelled.
