= Ram Deo Ram =

Indian politician (born 8th August 1932)

Ram Deo Ram (born 8th August 1932 in Garhi, Palamau district) is an Indian politician and member of the Bharatiya Janata Party. Ram was a first term member of the Lok Sabha in 1991 from the Palamu constituency in Palamau, Jharkhand.

He was elected to Bihar Legislative Assembly in 1967–69, 1977 & 1990. He was secretary of Jan Sangh he has four brouther Elder one (kauleshwar ram)older is (bhashdev ram) and (shivsankar ram)
