= Pradeep Yadav (Indian politician) =

Indian politician

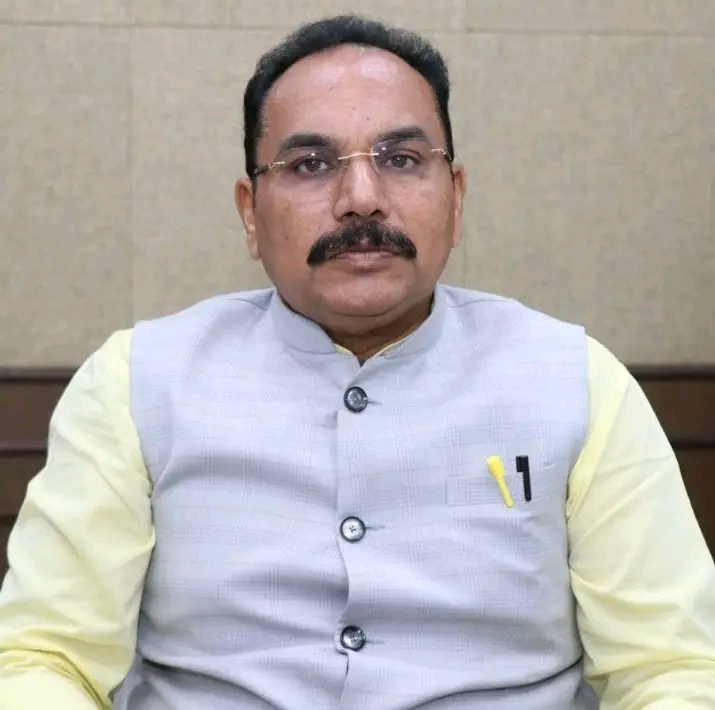

CLP leader in Jharkhand Legislative Assembly
- Incumbent
- Assumed office 2024
- Deputy: Rajesh Kachhap
- Preceded by: Rameshwar Oraon

Member of Jharkhand Legislative Assembly
- Incumbent
- Assumed office 2005
- Preceded by: Prashant Kumar
- Constituency: Poreyahat

Member of Parliament, Lok Sabha
- In office 2002–2004
- Preceded by: Jagdambi Prasad Yadav
- Succeeded by: Furkan Ansari
- Constituency: Godda

Personal details
- Born: 16 January 1966 (age 60) Bohra, Godda, Bihar (now in Jharkhand)
- Party: Indian National Congress (2020-present)
- Other political affiliations: Jharkhand Vikas Morcha (Prajatantrik); Bharatiya Janata Party
- Spouse: Bina Devi
- Children: 2
- Parent: Late Ashok Kumar Yadav

Pradeep Yadav is an Indian politician. His home town is Godda, Jharkhand and he is from Bohra village in Poreyahat block of Godda district. He is a current member of Jharkhand Legislative Assembly.

He was elected to the 13th Lok Sabha, lower house of the Parliament of India from Godda, Jharkhand as a member of the Bharatiya Janata Party in a by-election. He is a current Member of Legislative assembly of Jharkhand. He has been minister in the state cabinet twice. He was minister of Rural Development under the then chief minister Babulal Marandi.

The second time he was a minister under Arjun Munda and the ministry was Human resource development. He started his political life as a student leader and was member of Bharatiya Janata Party. In 2007 he left Bharatiya Janata Party to join Jharkhand Vikas Morcha (Prajatantrik). Both he and Bandhu Tirkey joined the Indian National Congress as Jharkhand Vikas Morcha (Prajatantrik) was merged with Bharatiya Janata Party.
