= Nishikant Dubey =

Indian politician (born 1969)

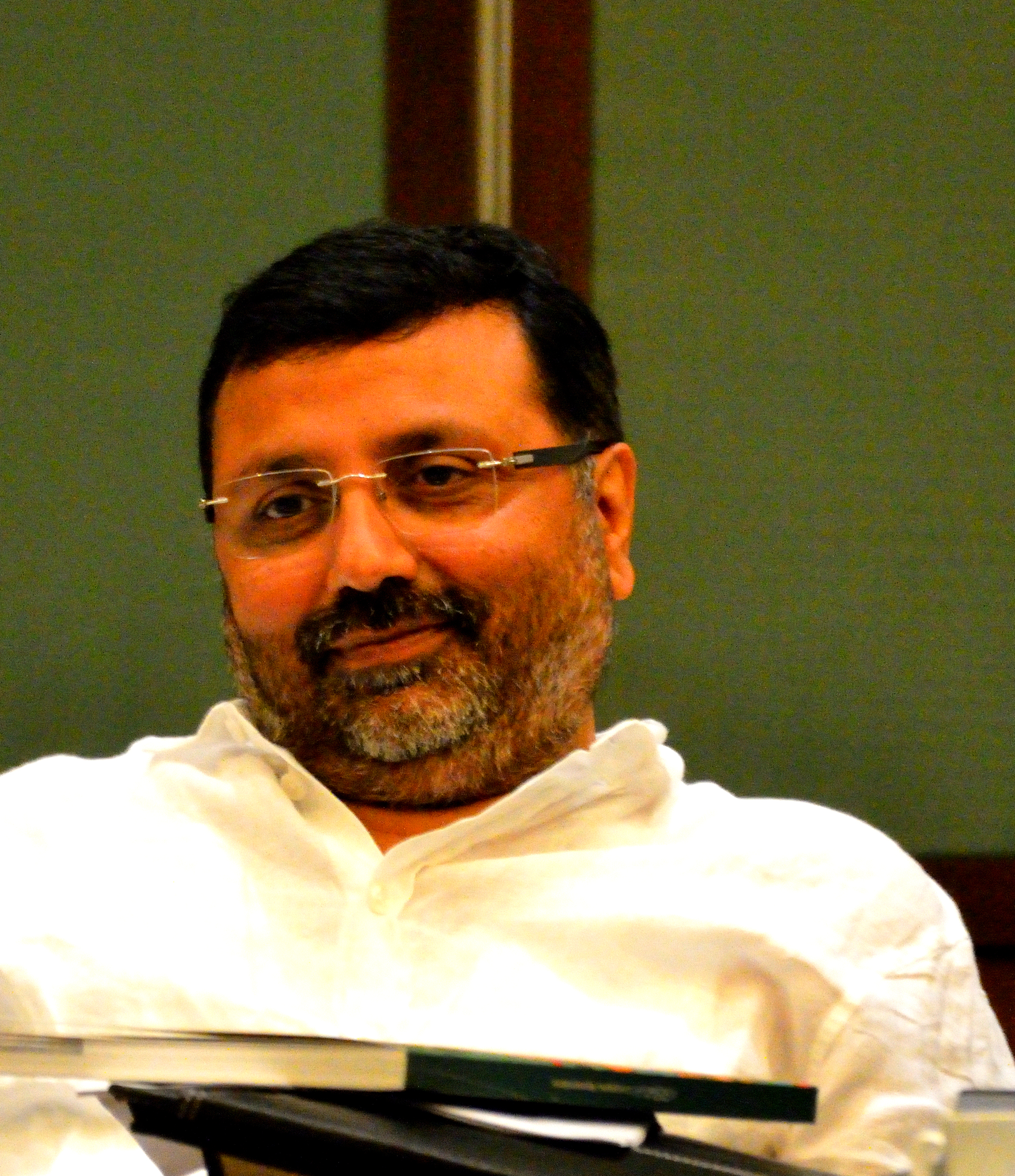
- Nishikant Dubey

Member of Parliament, Lok Sabha
- Incumbent
- Assumed office 16 May 2009
- Preceded by: Furqan Ansari
- Constituency: Godda

Personal details
- Born: 28 January 1969 (age 57) Bhagalpur, Bihar, India
- Citizenship: India
- Party: Bharatiya Janata Party
- Education: Marwari College, Bhagalpur
- Occupation: Politician

Nishikant Dubey (born 28 January 1969) is a member of India's 18th Lok Sabha, the lower house of the Indian Parliament. He is a member of the Bharatiya Janata Party and represents the Godda constituency in Jharkhand since May 2009, having won the seat in 2009 (15th Lok Sabha), 2014, 2019 and 2024.

== Positions held ==
#	From	To	Position
01	2009	2014	Elected to 15th Lok Sabha from Godda, Jharkhand
02	2009	2014	Member, Committee on Finance
03	2014	2019	Elected to 16th Lok Sabha
04	2014	2019	Member, PAC
05	2019	2024	Elected to 17th Lok Sabha
06	2024	Present	Elected to 18th Lok Sabha

== Controversy ==
In September 2020, a Public Interest Litigation (PIL) was filed before the Jharkhand High Court alleging that Nishikant Dubey had made false claims in his election affidavits for the 2009, 2014, and 2019 general elections regarding his educational qualifications. The petitioner asserted that Dubey had claimed to possess a Master of Business Administration degree from the Faculty of Management Studies (FMS), Delhi University. In support of the allegation, the PIL cited a response to a Right to Information (RTI) application from Delhi University, which reportedly stated that no student by the name “Nishikant Dubey” was enrolled at the said institute.

In March 2024, an FIR was registered against Dubey for allegedly usurping a private medical college through fraudulent means using the Medical Council of India and the Baba Baidyanath Medical Trust.

In April 2025, Dubey criticized Chief Justice of India Sanjiv Khanna during the hearings on the Waqf (Amendment) Act, 2025, accusing the court's actions of potentially leading to civil unrest. He also criticized former Chief Election Commissioner Dr. S. Y. Quraishi, calling him a 'Muslim Commissioner'.

In February 2026, Dubey moved a substantive motion in the Lok Sabha seeking to cancel the parliamentary membership of Rahul Gandhi and debar him from contesting elections. Dubey accused Gandhi of colluding with anti-India forces, citing Gandhi's references to ruling party politicians in relation to the Epstein files, the India–US trade deal, and claims in an unpublished memoir by former Army Chief M.M. Naravane.

Azad Adhikar Sena President Amitabh Thakur presented a complaint against Dubey and his wife before the Lokpal of India. The Lokpal dismissed the allegations, describing the complaint as frivolous. Dubey responded by calling the outcome a victory of truth ("Satyameva Jayate").

== Parliamentary scrutiny of Meta (2026) ==
As Chairman of the Parliamentary Standing Committee on Communications and Information Technology, Nishikant Dubey led Parliament's scrutiny of Meta Platforms over the temporary removal of Prime Minister Narendra Modi's Facebook video. The committee raised concerns regarding child sexual abuse material (CSAM), deepfakes, algorithmic bias, and content moderation failures, warning that Meta could lose its "safe harbour" protection under Section 79 of the Information Technology Act for non-compliance with Indian laws. The Indian government also summoned Meta's Chief Global Affairs Officer, Joel Kaplan, to explain the incident and the company's moderation practices.

== False affidavit in General Elections ==
Discrepancies in Dubey's age declarations have also been highlighted. In his 2009 Lok Sabha election affidavit, he declared his age as 37, implying a birth year of 1972, which would mean he cleared his matriculation exam from the Bihar School Examination Board in 1982 at the age of 10. Following public scrutiny regarding this timeline, he did not include his full educational history in subsequent affidavits.

== See also ==
- List of members of the 15th Lok Sabha
- List of members of the 16th Lok Sabha
- List of members of the 17th Lok Sabha
- List of members of the 18th Lok Sabha
