= Kameshwar Baitha =

Indian politician

Former Member of Parliament
- In office 15th Lok Sabha 2009-2014
- Preceded by: Manoj Kumar
- Succeeded by: Vishnu Dayal Ram
- Constituency: Palamu, Jharkhand, India

Personal details
- Born: 15 March 1956 (age 70) Dhanchabar, Palamu, (Jharkhand).
- Citizenship: India
- Party: Bahujan Samaj Party
- Other political affiliations: Jharkhand Mukti Morcha (until 2014) All India Trinamool Congress Rashtriya Janata Dal (until 2024)
- Spouse: Deomunia Devi
- Children: 03 sons and 01 daughter.
- Profession: Social Worker and Politician.
- Committees: Committee on Railways (Member).

Kameshwar Baitha was a member of the 15th Lok Sabha of India. He represented the Palamu constituency of Jharkhand. He was the state President of All India Trinamool Congress Jharkhand Unit and last contested the Lok Sabha 2024 elections for Palamu district from the Bahujan Samaj Party. He was originally a member of the Jharkhand Mukti Morcha political party, but joined the Bharatiya Janata Party in 2014. He left the BJP for the Trinamool Congress after failing to get a ticket for the general Elections of 2014. After joining the Rashtriya Janata Dal sometime after 2014, he resigned in 2024, joining the Bahujan Samaj Party and contesting under the party's banner.

== Education and background ==
Kameshwar Baitha was born in a village in the Bishrampur block of the Palamu district (then part of Bihar). The highest educational qualification attained by Baitha is matriculation. During the 1970s, the rampant feudalism and the resulting marginalisation of the landless lower castes led to social unrest in Palamu and other parts of Bihar. Several low-caste people joined the Naxalite–Maoist insurgent groups. Baitha joined Party Unity in the late 1980s, after the Arwal massacre in which 21 supporters of the left-wing group Mazdoor Kisan Sangharsh Samiti (MKSS) were killed in police firing. As a Naxal insurgent, he commandeered the Koel-Sankh zone of the CPI (Maoist).

As a result of his Naxalite past, he is facing as many as 53 criminal cases in various courts that includes killing of 17 PAC jawans and divisional forest officer Sanjay Singh at Rehal village on Kaimur hills in Rohtas. He was the only jail inmate when selected as MP in 2009. Baitha denied his involvement in any violence, stating that he had never touched a weapon in his life during his "27 years of struggle for the people's cause."

== Political career ==
In 2009, Kameshwar Baitha won the Lok Sabha elections from Palamu, which is reserved for Scheduled Caste candidates. He had contested the elections on a JMM ticket, while lodged in a Bihar jail. He defeated Rashtriya Janata Dal's sitting MP Ghuran Ram. After winning the elections, he spent two years and 7 months in jail, getting bail in late 2011.

Baitha left JMM in 2014. He declared that he had joined the Bharatiya Janata Party (BJP), but BJP declined this and did not approve his membership. He then joined TMC, and was given a ticket for the 2014 Lok Sabha elections.

=== Posts held ===
#	From	To	Position
01	2009	-	Elected to 15th Lok Sabha
02	2009	-	Member, Committee on Railways

== See also ==
- List of members of the 15th Lok Sabha of India
- Politics of India
- Parliament of India
- Government of India
