= Palamu Lok Sabha constituency =

Lok Sabha constituency in Jharkhand

Coordinates: 23.8°N 85.9°E

Palamu JH-13
- Lok Sabha constituency
- Interactive Map Outlining Palamu Lok Sabha constituency

Constituency details
- Country: India
- Region: East India
- State: Jharkhand
- Assembly constituencies: Daltonganj; Bishrampur; Chhatarpur; Hussainabad; Garhwa; Bhawanathpur
- Established: 1952
- Reservation: SC

Member of Parliament
- 18th Lok Sabha
- Incumbent Vishnu Dayal Ram
- Party: BJP
- Alliance: NDA
- Elected year: 2024

Palamu Lok Sabha constituency (formerly Palamau Lok Sabha constituency) is one of the 14 Lok Sabha (parliamentary) constituencies in Jharkhand state in eastern India. This constituency is reserved for candidates belonging to the Scheduled castes. This constituency covers the entire Garhwa district and part of Palamu district.

== Assembly segments ==
Palamu Lok Sabha constituency comprises the following six Vidhan Sabha (legislative assembly) segments:

#	Name	District	Member	Party	2024 Lead
76	Daltonganj	Palamu	Alok Kumar Chaurasiya	BJP	BJP
77	Bishrampur	Palamu	Naresh Prasad Singh	RJD	BJP
78	Chhatarpur (SC)	Palamu	Radha Krishna Kishore	INC	BJP
79	Hussainabad	Palamu	Sanjay Kumar Singh Yadav	RJD	BJP
80	Garhwa	Garhwa	Satyendra Nath Tiwari	BJP	BJP
81	Bhawanathpur	Garhwa	Anant Pratap Deo	JMM	BJP

== Members of Parliament ==
Year	Member	Party
1952	Gajendra Prasad Sinha	Indian National Congress
1957	Gajendra Prasad Sinha	Indian National Congress
1962	Shashank Manjari	Swatantra Party
1967	Kamla Kumari	Indian National Congress
1971	Kamla Kumari	Indian National Congress
1977	Ramdeni Ram	Janata Party
1980	Kamla Kumari	Indian National Congress (I)
1984	Kamla Kumari	Indian National Congress
1989	Jorawar Ram	Janata Dal
1991	Ram Deo Ram	Bharatiya Janata Party
1996	Braj Mohan Ram	Bharatiya Janata Party
1998	Braj Mohan Ram	Bharatiya Janata Party
1999	Braj Mohan Ram	Bharatiya Janata Party
2004	Manoj Kumar	Rashtriya Janata Dal
2006^	Ghuran Ram	Rashtriya Janata Dal
2009	Kameshwar Baitha	Jharkhand Mukti Morcha
2014	Vishnu Dayal Ram	Bharatiya Janata Party
2019	Vishnu Dayal Ram	Bharatiya Janata Party
2024	Vishnu Dayal Ram	Bharatiya Janata Party

== Election results ==
=== 2024 ===
2024 Indian general election: Palamau
Party	Candidate	Votes	%	±%
BJP	Vishnu Dayal Ram	770,362	55.39	
RJD	Mamta Bhuiyan	4,81,555	34.53	
NOTA	None of the above	24,343	1.75	
Majority		2,88,807	20.86	
Turnout		13,92,035	61.92	
BJP hold		Swing		

=== 2019 ===
2019 Indian general elections: Palamau
Party	Candidate	Votes	%	±%
BJP	Vishnu Dayal Ram	755,659	62.46	
RJD	Ghuran Ram	2,78,053	22.98	
BSP	Anjana Bhuiyan	53,597	4.43	
CPI(M-L)	Sushma Mehta	5,004	0.41	
Majority		4,77,606	39.48	
Turnout		12,10,426	64.34	
BJP hold		Swing		

=== 2014 ===
2014 Indian general elections: Palamau
Party	Candidate	Votes	%	±%
BJP	Vishnu Dayal Ram	4,76,513	48.76	
RJD	Manoj Kumar	2,12,571	21.75	
JVM(P)	Ghuran Ram	1,56,832	16.05	
Majority		2,63,942	27.01	
Turnout		9,78,159	59.43	
BJP gain from JMM		Swing		

=== 2009 ===
2009 Indian general elections: Palamau
Party	Candidate	Votes	%	±%
JMM	Kameshwar Baitha	1,67,995	25.78	
RJD	Ghuran Ram	1,44,457	22.17	
JVM(P)	Prabhat Kumar	90,206	13.84	
Majority		23,538	3.61	
Turnout		6,51,579	45.97	
JMM gain from RJD		Swing		

== See also ==
- Palamu district
- Garhwa district
- List of constituencies of the Lok Sabha
