= Godda Lok Sabha constituency =

Lok Sabha Constituency in Jharkhand

Coordinates: 24.83°N 87.21°E

Godda JH-3
- Lok Sabha constituency
- Interactive Map Outlining Godda Lok Sabha constituency

Constituency details
- Country: India
- Region: East India
- State: Jharkhand
- Assembly constituencies: Jarmundi; Madhupur; Deoghar; Poreyahat; Godda; Mahagama
- Established: 1962
- Reservation: None

Member of Parliament
- 18th Lok Sabha
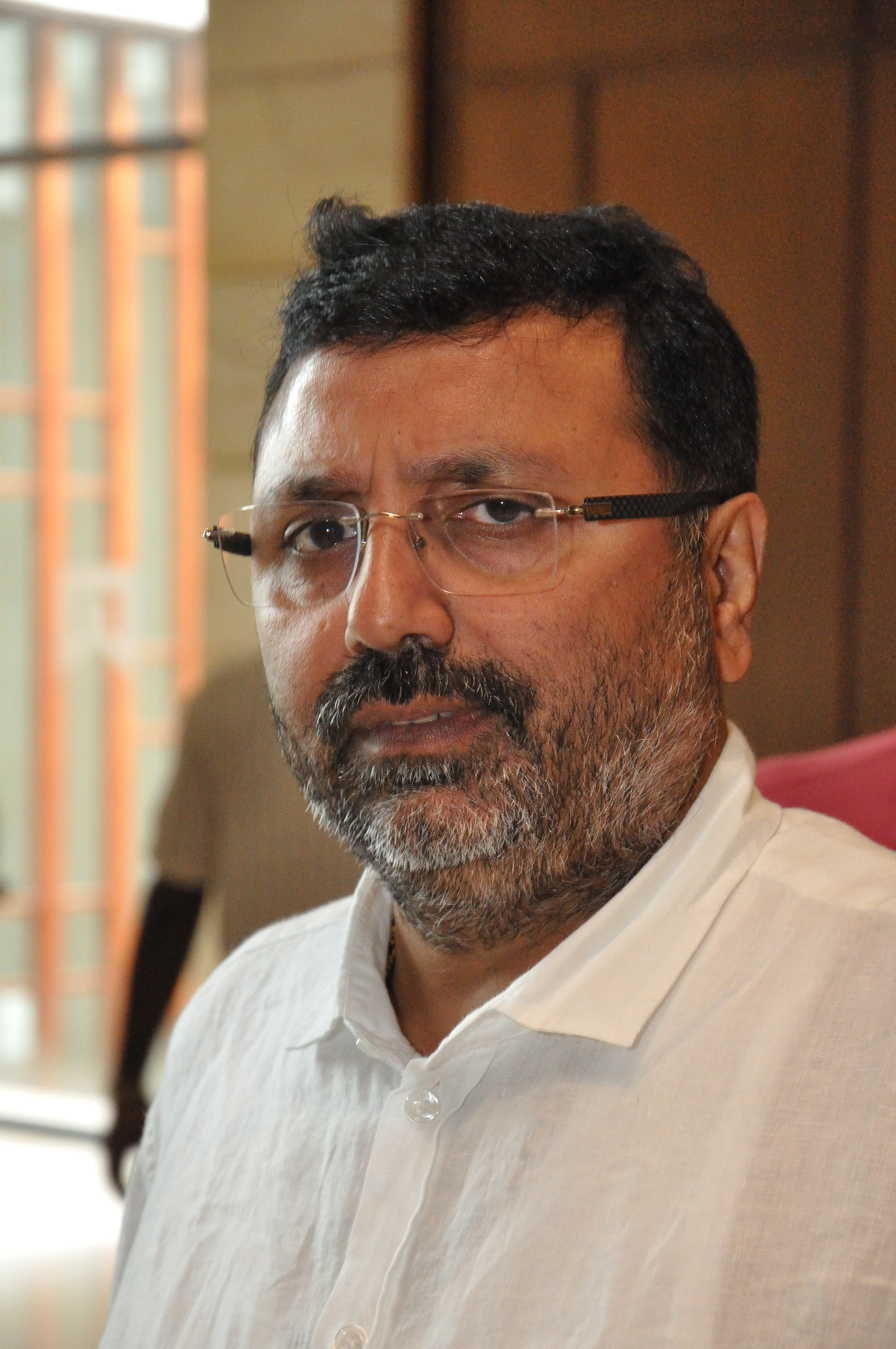
- Incumbent Nishikant Dubey
- Party: BJP
- Alliance: NDA
- Elected year: 2024

Godda Lok Sabha constituency is one of the 14 Lok Sabha (parliamentary) constituencies in Jharkhand state in eastern India. This constituency covers the entire Godda district and parts of Deoghar and Dumka districts.

== Assembly segments ==
Presently, Godda Lok Sabha constituency comprises the following six Vidhan Sabha (legislative assembly) segments:

#	Name	District	Member	Party	2024 Lead
12	Jarmundi	Dumka	Devendra Kunwar	BJP	BJP
13	Madhupur	Deoghar	Hafizul Hasan	JMM	INC
15	Deoghar (SC)	Deoghar	Suresh Paswan	RJD	BJP
16	Poreyahat	Godda	Pradeep Yadav	INC	BJP
17	Godda	Godda	Sanjay Prasad Yadav	RJD	BJP
18	Mahagama	Godda	Dipika Pandey Singh	INC	INC

== Members of Parliament ==
Year	Member	Party
1962	Prabhu Dayal Himatsingka	Indian National Congress
1967	Prabhu Dayal Himatsingka	Indian National Congress
1971	Jagdish Mandal	Indian National Congress
1977	Jagdambi Prasad Yadav	Janata Party
1980	Maulana Saminuddin	Indian National Congress (I)
1984	Maulana Salahuddin	Indian National Congress
1989	Janardan Yadav	Bharatiya Janata Party
1991	Suraj Mandal	Jharkhand Mukti Morcha
1996	Jagdambi Prasad Yadav	Bharatiya Janata Party
1998	Jagdambi Prasad Yadav	Bharatiya Janata Party
1999	Jagdambi Prasad Yadav	Bharatiya Janata Party
2002^	Pradeep Yadav	Bharatiya Janata Party
2004	Furkan Ansari	Indian National Congress
2009	Nishikant Dubey	Bharatiya Janata Party
2014	Nishikant Dubey	Bharatiya Janata Party
2019	Nishikant Dubey	Bharatiya Janata Party
2024	Nishikant Dubey	Bharatiya Janata Party

== Election results ==
=== General election 2024 ===
2024 Indian general election: Godda
Party	Candidate	Votes	%	±%
BJP	Nishikant Dubey	693,140	49.57	
INC	Pradeep Yadav	5,91,327	42.29	
Independent	Sumit Mohan Jha	96,837	1.92	
NOTA	None of the above	4,361	0.31	
Majority		1,01,813	7.28	
Turnout		14,02,941	69.10	
BJP hold		Swing		

=== General election 2019 ===
2019 Indian general elections: Godda
Party	Candidate	Votes	%	±%
BJP	Nishikant Dubey	637,610	53.40	+17.15
JVM(P)	Pradeep Yadav	4,53,383	37.97	+19.53
NOTA	None of the Above	18,683	1.56	
BSP	Zafffar Obaid	17,583	1.47	
Independent	K. Rangaiah	16,456	1.38	
Majority		1,84,227	15.43	+9.65
Turnout		11,94,343	69.57	
BJP hold		Swing		

=== General election 2014 ===
2014 Indian general elections: Godda
Party	Candidate	Votes	%	±%
BJP	Nishikant Dubey	380,500	36.25	
INC	Furkan Ansari	3,19,818	30.47	
JVM(P)	Pradeep Yadav	1,93,506	18.44	
AITC	Damodar Singh	28,246	2.69	
Independent	Sunil Kumar Gupta	22,349	2.13	
NOTA	None of the Above	12,410	1.18	
Majority		60,682	5.78	
Turnout		10,49,642	65.98	
BJP hold		Swing		

== See also ==
- Deoghar district
- Godda district
- List of constituencies of the Lok Sabha
