= Ravindra Kumar Pandey =

Indian politician

Member of the Lok Sabha
- In office 1 September 1996 – 2004
- Preceded by: Binod Bihari Mahato
- Succeeded by: Tek Lal Mahto
- Constituency: Giridih
- In office 2009–2019
- Preceded by: Tek Lal Mahto
- Succeeded by: Chandra Prakash Choudhary
- Constituency: Giridih

Personal details
- Born: 20 January 1959 (age 67) Ghutiatand, Bokaro
- Party: Bharatiya Janata Party
- Spouse: Smt. Laxmi Pandey
- Children: 5, Vikram Pandey(included)
- Occupation: Businessperson
- Website: https://ravinderkumar.in
- As of 15 December, 2016

Ravindra Kumar Pandey (born 20 January 1959; Hindi pronunciation: [ɾəʋɪn̪d̪ɾə kʊmaːɾ paːɳɖeːj]) is an Indian politician belonging to Bharatiya Janata Party. He was a member of the Indian Parliament, representing Giridih (Lok Sabha constituency). He was denied ticket in the 2019 Lok Sabha election as the seat was given to AJSU's Chandraprakash Choudhary, who won the election thus being first Lok Sabha member from AJSU.

== Biography ==
His father was late Krishna Murari Pandey, and his mother is Ramdulari Devi. He is a Bhumihar born in a place called Ghutiatand, in Bokaro district, Jharkhand state, India. He holds a bachelor's degree, and was educated at K. B. College, Bermo. He is married to Laxmi Pandey, and has three sons and two daughters. He has been M.P. from Giridih for 5 terms. He defeated Jagannath Mahto in 2014 Lok Sabha elections. He is a native from Tamsi of Aurangabad district of Bihar.
