= Jharkhand Vikas Morcha (Prajatantrik) =

Political party in India

- Abbreviation: JVM (P)
- Founder: Babulal Marandi
- Founded: 24 September 2006 (19 years ago)
- Dissolved: 17 February 2020 (6 years ago)
- Split from: Bharatiya Janata Party
- Merged into: Bharatiya Janata Party
- Headquarters: Ranchi, Jharkhand
- Student wing: Jharkhand Vikas Chatra Morcha
- Youth wing: Jharkhand Vikas Yuva Morcha
- Peasant's wing: Jharkhand Vikas Kissan Morcha
- Ideology: Big tent
- Colours: Green & Yellow
- ECI Status: State Party
- Alliance: Mahagathbandhan (2018-2020); United Progressive Alliance (2009-2012)

Election symbol
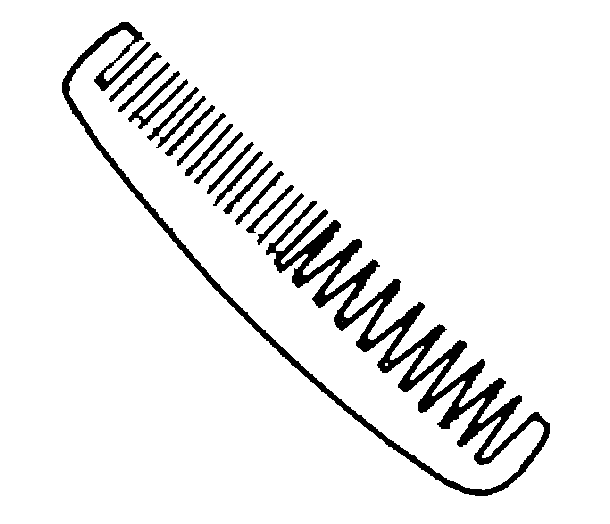

Website
- jvmp.in

Jharkhand Vikas Morcha (Prajatantrik) (JVM (P)) (transl. 'Jharkhand Development Front (Democratic)') was a state political party in the Indian state of Jharkhand which was founded by former Union Minister and the first Chief Minister of Jharkhand, Babulal Marandi.

== Formation ==
Lock and Key Symbol was used by Marandi in 2006 Kodarma By-election ran as Independent Candidate

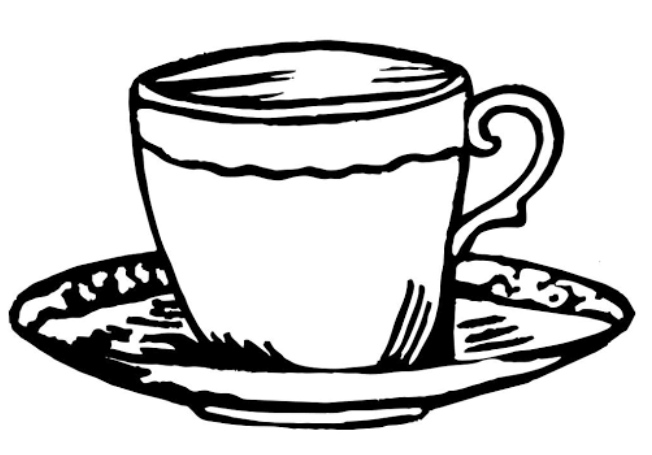
Cup and Saucer Symbol was used by JVM in 2009 Lok Sabha election

The party's formation was announced by Marandi at Hazaribagh on 24 September 2006. Marandi was earlier a member of the Bharatiya Janata Party, but he quit in mid-2006 because he felt he was being sidelined in the party.

Six JVM(P) MLAs on 11 Feb 2015 joined the BJP, a day after petitioning the Speaker to allow them to sit alongside the ruling BJP-led coalition members in the state Assembly. Naveen Jaiswal (Hatia), Amar Kumar Bauri (Chandankiyari), Ganesh Ganju (Simaria), Alok Kumar Chourasia (Daltonganj), Randhir Kumar Singh (Sarath) and Janki Yadav (Barkatha) joined the BJP at the Jharkhand Bhavan in New Delhi.

== Dissolution ==
Jharkhand Vikas Morcha (Prajatantrik) merged with the Bharatiya Janata Party on February 17, 2020, at Jagannathpur Maidan, Ranchi in presence of Union Home Minister Amit Shah, BJP president Jagat Prakash Nadda and former Chief Ministers of Jharkhand Arjun Munda and Raghubar Das. Earlier, Marandi had expelled MLAs Pradeep Yadav and Bandhu Tirkey from the party for “anti-party activities”. Both of them later joined Indian National Congress in its Delhi headquarters.

== Electoral history ==
=== General election results ===
Election Year	Seats contested	Seats won	± seats	Overall Votes	Voteshare (%)
2009	14	1	New	963,274	0.23
2014	14	0	▼1	1,579,772	0.29
2019	2	0	Steady	750,799	0.12

=== Legislative Assembly election results ===
Election Year	Seats contested	Seats won	± seats	Overall Votes	Voteshare (%)
2009	25	11	New	923,671	8.99
2014	73	8	▼3	1,385,080	9.99
2019	81	3	▼6	820,757	5.45
