= Tilakdhari Singh =

Indian politician (1938–2025)

Member of Parliament, Lok Sabha
- In office 1999–2004
- Preceded by: R.L.P. Verma
- Succeeded by: Babu Lal Marandi
- In office 1984–1989
- Preceded by: R.L.P. Verma
- Succeeded by: R.L.P. Verma
- Constituency: Kodarma, Jharkhand

Personal details
- Born: 8 January 1938 Chatro, Giridih district, Bihar Province, British India (now Jharkhand, India)
- Died: 21 April 2025 (aged 87) Giridih district, Jharkhand, India
- Party: Indian National Congress
- Spouse: Bhagwati Devi

Tilakdhari Prasad Singh (8 January 1938 – 21 April 2025) was an Indian politician. He was a Member of Parliament, representing Kodarma, Jharkhand in the Lok Sabha the lower house of India's Parliament for 2 terms as a member of the Indian National Congress. He also served as a member of the legislative assembly from Dhanwar Assembly constituency in Giridih district. On the grounds of his old age, he forwarded his political legacy to his younger son Dhananjay. Dhananjay was recently the President of the District Congress Committee, Giridih.

Singh died on 21 April 2025, at the age of 87. He had been suffering from diabetes and other chronic illnesses and had been undergoing hospital treatment at the time of his death.
