= Furqan Ansari =

Indian politician

Furkan Ansari

Member of Parliament, Lok Sabha
- In office 16 May 2004 – 18 May 2009
- Preceded by: Pradeep Yadav
- Succeeded by: Nishikant Dubey
- Constituency: Godda

Personal details
- Born: 5 February 1948 (age 78) Madhupur, Jharkhand, India
- Party: Indian National Congress
- Spouse: Mustari Khatoon
- Children: 4
- As of 25 September, 2006

Furkan Ansari (born 5 February 1948) is an Indian politician. A member of the Indian National Congress (INC), he was the Member of Parliament for the Godda constituency of Jharkhand in the 14th Lok Sabha (2004–2009). He is Senior INC Leader of Jharkhand and was a Member of Bihar and Jharkhand Legislative Assembly for five terms from 1980 to 2004.

His son Irfan Ansari is a Member of the Jharkhand Legislative Assembly for the Jamtara constituency; he too is an INC member.
