= Babulal Marandi =

Indian politician (born 1958)

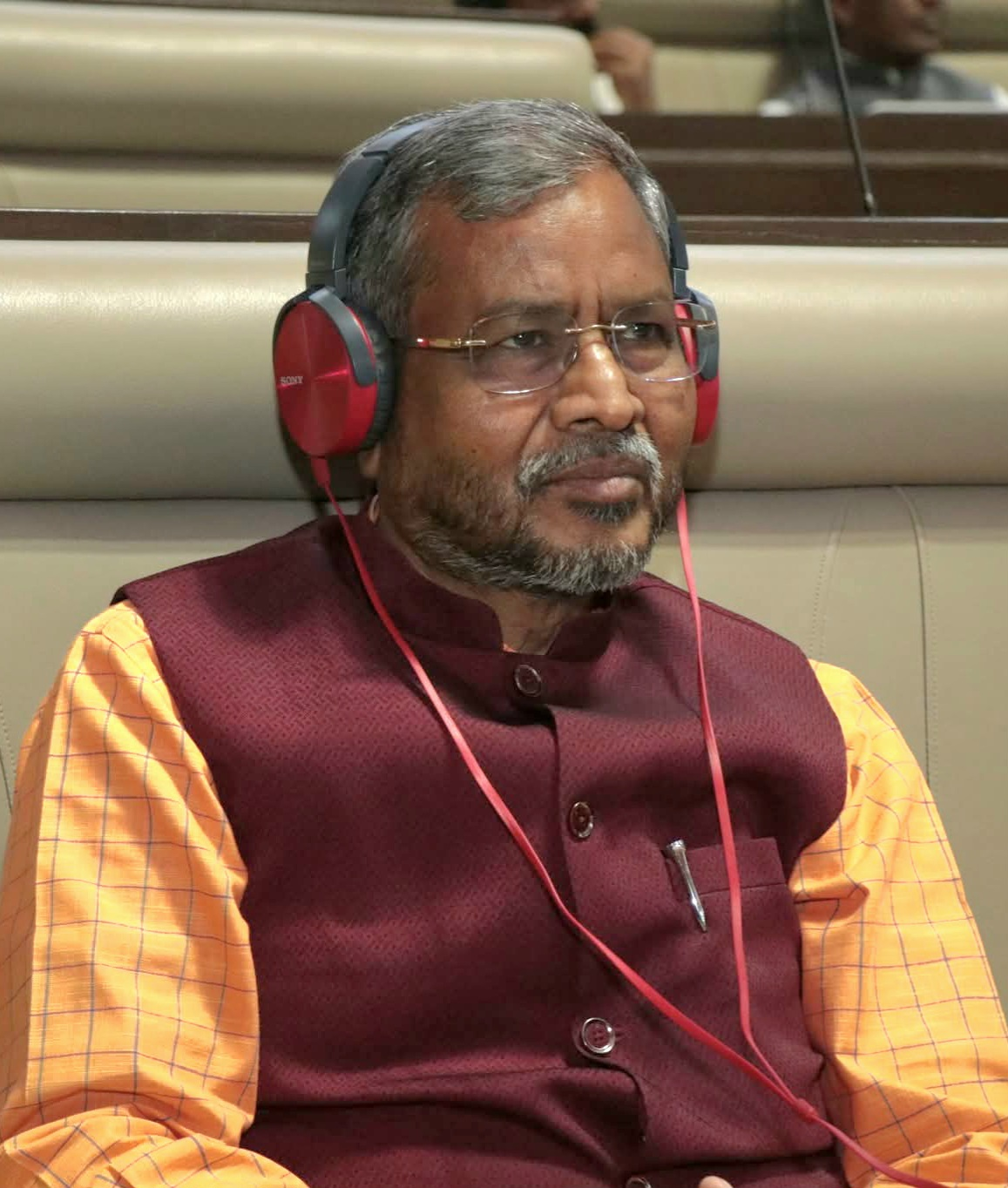
- Marandi in 2025

7th Leader of the Opposition Jharkhand Legislative Assembly
- Incumbent
- Assumed office 6 March 2025
- Chief Minister: Hemant Soren
- Preceded by: Amar Kumar Bauri
- In office 24 February 2020 - 16 October 2023
- Chief Minister: Hemant Soren
- Preceded by: Hemant Soren
- Succeeded by: Amar Kumar Bauri

President of Bharatiya Janata Party, Jharkhand
- In office 4 July 2023 – 14 January 2026
- President: J. P. Nadda
- Preceded by: Deepak Prakash
- Succeeded by: Aditya Sahu

1st Chief Minister of Jharkhand
- In office 15 November 2000 – 17 March 2003
- Preceded by: Office Established
- Succeeded by: Arjun Munda

President of Jharkhand Vikas Morcha (Prajatantrik)
- In office 24 September 2006 – 17 February 2020
- Preceded by: Office established
- Succeeded by: Office abolished

Member of the Jharkhand Legislative Assembly
- Incumbent
- Assumed office 23 December 2019
- Preceded by: Raj Kumar Yadav
- Constituency: Dhanwar
- In office 23 March 2001 – 16 May 2004
- Succeeded by: Chandra Prakash Choudhary
- Constituency: Ramgarh

Minister of state for Environment and Forests
- In office 19 March 1998 – 7 November 2000
- Prime Minister: Atal Bihari Vajpayee
- Minister: T. R. Baalu

Member of Parliament, Lok Sabha
- In office 16 May 2004 – 16 May 2014
- Preceded by: Tilakdhari Singh
- Succeeded by: Ravindra Kumar Ray
- Constituency: Kodarma
- In office 10 March 1998 – 23 March 2001
- Preceded by: Shibu Soren
- Succeeded by: Shibu Soren
- Constituency: Dumka

Personal details
- Born: 11 January 1958 (age 68) Giridih, Bihar (now in Jharkhand), India
- Party: Bharatiya Janata Party (1991- 2006, 2020–present)
- Other political affiliations: Jharkhand Vikas Morcha (Prajatantrik) (2006–2020); Communist Party of India (till 1991)
- Spouse: Shanti Murmu
- Children: 2
- Education: Ranchi University
- Website: Official website

Babulal Marandi (Hindi pronunciation: [Bābulāl maraṇḍi]; born 11 January 1958) is an Indian politician and a prominent tribal leader of the Bharatiya Janata Party (BJP) . He is currently the 7th Leader of Opposition in Jharkhand legislative assembly since 2024. He was the first Chief Minister of Jharkhand and the founder of Jharkhand Vikas Morcha (Prajatantrik), which he later merged with BJP. He has been a Member of Parliament in the 12th, 13th 14th and 15th Lok Sabha from Jharkhand. He was also the Union State Minister (MoS) for Forests & Environment of India in the BJP-led National Democratic Alliance Government in 1998 to 2000. He was appointed Jharkhand BJP president on 4 July 2023 and served till 14 January 2026.

== Early life ==
Babulal was born in a remote Kodia Bandh village under Tisri block of Giridih district of the now Jharkhand province. He belongs to Santal family. After passing high school, he moved to Giridih College from where he did his intermediate and graduation. It was there that he came in contact with the Rashtriya Swayamsevak Sangh.

Later, he moved to Ranchi where he did his post-graduation in Geography from Ranchi University. He worked as a teacher in a village primary school for a year before giving up the job to work for the Sangh Parivar. He served as the organising secretary of the Jharkhand region of Vishva Hindu Parishad.

In 1983, he moved to Dumka and worked in the Santhal Pargana division, which he toured extensively and where he became close to Bishnu Prasad Bhaiya, his then companion. There he used to spend some time at his Jamtara Residence but mainly he used to live in the RSS office in Dumka. Thereafter his journey to Ranchi and Delhi began.

== Political career ==
In 1991, the Bharatiya Janata Party gave him the ticket to contest from the Dumka (Lok Sabha constituency), but he lost. In 1996, he lost to Shibu Soren by just 5,000 odd votes. The BJP, in the meantime, made him president of the party's Jharkhand unit.

It was under Marandi's leadership that the party won 12 out of 14 Lok Sabha seats in Jharkhand region in the 1998 election. Marandi, a Santal, led the tally by defeating Jharkhand Mukti Morcha leader Shibu Soren, another Santhal.

The victory gave an immense boost to Marandi's profile and he was included in the Union Council of Ministers, one of four ministers from Bihar.

=== First CM of Jharkhand ===
After bifurcation of Bihar in 2000 in states of Bihar and Jharkhand, NDA came to power in Jharkhand with Marandi as the 1st Chief Minister of Jharkhand. Political analysts believe that this government initiated many developmental schemes in the state, the most visible being, improvement of the road network in the state.

He also put forward the idea to develop Greater Ranchi to reduce the crowding in the city. However, Marandi's tenure proved rather short-lived, as he had to resign and make way for Arjun Munda for the post in 2003 following pressure exerted by coalition allies primarily Janata Dal United.

Thereafter, his increasing moved away from political mainstage of Jharkhand irrespective of NDA being in power in Ranchi. In the 2004 Lok Sabha Elections, he contested from Kodarma Lok Sabha constituency as a BJP candidate. He won the seat while all the other sitting MPs of NDA from Jharkhand including union ministers Yashwant Sinha and Reeta Verma lost their respective seats. His differences with the state leadership continued to increase and he even started criticising the state government in public.

=== Jharkhand Vikas Morcha (JVM) ===
Marandi resigned from both the Kodarma seat and the primary membership of the BJP in 2006 and floated a new political outfit named Jharkhand Vikas Morcha. He was followed by 5 MLAs of the BJP. In the subsequent by-elections for the Kodarma seat, he contested as an independent candidate and emerged victoriously.

Marandi, who was the incumbent MP from Kodarma, contested the elections on Jharkhand Vikas Morcha ticket in the 2009 general election, and retained the seat. But in the Narendra Modi wave of 2014, Marandi's party failed to win any seat in the state as BJP won 12 out of 14 seats; from Koderma, BJP's Ravindra Kumar Ray was elected to Lok Sabha.

In February 2020, he merged JVM into BJP.

=== Bharatiya Janata Party ===
Marandi merged Jharkhand Vikas Morcha (Prajatantrik) with the BJP on February 17, 2020, at Jagannathpur Maidan, Ranchi in presence of Union Home Minister Amit Shah, BJP president Jagat Prakash Nadda and former Chief Ministers of Jharkhand Arjun Munda and Raghubar Das.

== Personal life ==
Babulal Marandi is married to Shanti Murmu. His younger son Anup Marandi was killed in a Naxal attack at Chilkhari village in Jharkhand's Giridih district on 27 October 2007.

== Electoral history ==
=== Indian general elections ===
Year	Constituency	Party	Votes	%	Result
1991	Dumka	BJP	126,528	28.34	Lost
1996	Dumka	BJP	159,933	30.89	Lost
1998	Dumka	BJP	277,334	47.01	Won
1999	Dumka	BJP	201,141	36.87	Won
2004	Kodarma	BJP	366,656	44.4	Won
2006^	Kodarma	Independent	325,871	43	Won
2009	Kodarma	JVM(P)	199,462	25.6	Won
2014	Dumka	JVM(P)	158,122	17.51	Lost
2019	Kodarma	JVM(P)	297,416	24.59	Lost

^by-election

=== Jharkhand Legislative Assembly ===
Year	Constituency	Party	Votes	%	Opponent	Opponent Party	Opponent Votes	%	Result	Margin	%
2024	Dhanwar	BJP	106,296	45.35	Nizam Uddin Ansari	JMM	70,858	30.23	Won	35,438	15.12
2019	Dhanwar	JVM(P)	52,352	27.58	Lakshman Prasad Singh	BJP	34,802	18.33	Won	17,550	9.25
2014	Dhanwar	JVM(P)	39,922	22.59	Raj Kumar Yadav	CPI(ML)L	50,634	28.66	Lost	-10,712	-6.07
2001	Ramgarh (by-election)	BJP	55,884	43.4	Nadra Begum	CPI	35,966	27.93	Won	19,918	15.47

Political offices
Preceded by office created	1st Chief Minister of Jharkhand; 15 November 2000 - 18 March 2003	Succeeded by Arjun Munda
Party political offices
Preceded by Office established	President of JVM (P); September 2009 - February 2020	Succeeded by office abolished
