= List of by-elections to the Jharkhand Legislative Assembly =

The following is a list of by-elections held for the Jharkhand Legislative Assembly, India, since its formation in 2000.

== 2009 - 2014 ==
S.No	Date	Constituency	MLA before election	Party before election	Elected MLA	Party after election
10 February 2011	57	Kharsawan	Mangal Singh Soy	Bharatiya Janata Party	Arjun Munda	Bharatiya Janata Party
30 November 2011	24	Mandu	Tek Lal Mahto	Jharkhand Mukti Morcha	Jai Prakash Bhai Patel	Jharkhand Mukti Morcha
12 June 2012	64	Hatia	Gopal Sharan Nath Shahdeo	Indian National Congress	Navin Jaiswal	All Jharkhand Students Union

== 2014 - 2019 ==
Date	S.No	Constituency	MLA before election	Party before election	Elected MLA	Party after election
14 December 2015	72	Lohardaga	Kamal Kishore Bhagat	All Jharkhand Students Union	Sukhdeo Bhagat	Indian National Congress
16 May 2016	17	Godda	Raghu Nandan Mandal	Bharatiya Janata Party	Amit Kumar Mandal	Bharatiya Janata Party
16 May 2016	75	Panki	Bidesh Singh	Indian National Congress	Devendra Kumar Singh	Indian National Congress
9 April 2017	4	Litipara	Anil Murmu	Jharkhand Mukti Morcha	Simon Marandi	Jharkhand Mukti Morcha
28 May 2018	34	Gomia	Yogendra Prasad	Jharkhand Mukti Morcha	Babita Devi	Jharkhand Mukti Morcha
28 May 2018	61	Silli	Amit Kumar	Jharkhand Mukti Morcha	Seema Devi	Jharkhand Mukti Morcha
20 December 2018	71	Kolebira	Anosh Ekka	Jharkhand Party	Naman Bixal Kongari	Indian National Congress

== 2019 - 2024 ==
Date	S.No	Constituency	MLA before election	Party before election	Elected MLA	Party after election	Reason
3 November 2020	10	Dumka	Hemant Soren	Jharkhand Mukti Morcha	Basant Soren	Jharkhand Mukti Morcha	
3 November 2020	35	Bermo	Rajendra Prasad Singh	Indian National Congress	Kumar Jaimangal (Anup Singh)	Indian National Congress	
17 April 2021	13	Madhupur	Haji Hussain Ansari	Jharkhand Mukti Morcha	Hafizul Hasan	Jharkhand Mukti Morcha	Death of Haji Hussain Ansari
23 June 2022	66	Mandar	Bandhu Tirkey	Indian National Congress	Shilpi Neha Tirkey	Indian National Congress	Conviction of Bandhu Tirkey.
27 February 2023	23	Ramgarh	Mamta Devi	Indian National Congress	Sunita Choudhary	All Jharkhand Students Union	Conviction of Mamta Devi
5 September 2023	33	Dumri	Jagannath Mahto	Jharkhand Mukti Morcha	Baby Devi	Jharkhand Mukti Morcha	Death of Jagannath Mahto
20 May 2024	31	Gandey	Sarfaraz Ahmad	Jharkhand Mukti Morcha	Kalpana Soren	Jharkhand Mukti Morcha	Resignation of Sarfaraz Ahmad.

== 2024 - 2029 ==
Date	Constituency		Previous MLA		Reason	Elected MLA	
11 November 2025	45	Ghatshila	Ramdas Soren	Jharkhand Mukti Morcha	Died on 15 August 2025	Somesh Chandra Soren	Jharkhand Mukti Morcha

== See also ==
- Elections in Jharkhand
- List of Indian state legislative assembly elections
