= Tundi Assembly constituency =

Constituency of the Jharkhand legislative assembly in India

Coordinates: 23.99°N 86.45°E

Tundi
- Constituency No. 42 for the Jharkhand Legislative Assembly

Constituency details
- Country: India
- Region: East India
- State: Jharkhand
- District: Dhanbad
- Lok Sabha constituency: Giridih
- Established: 1977
- Total electors: 280,475
- Reservation: None

Member of Legislative Assembly
- 5th Jharkhand Legislative Assembly
- Incumbent Mathura Prasad Mahato
- Party: JMM
- Alliance: MGB
- Elected year: 2024

Tundi Assembly constituency is an assembly constituency in the Indian state of Jharkhand.

== Members of the Legislative Assembly ==
Election	Member	Party
Bihar Legislative Assembly
Before 1957: see Tundi cum Nirsa constituency
1957	Ram Chandra Prasad Sharma	Indian National Congress
1962	Gokuleshwar Mishra	Swatantra Party
1967	Gokuleshwar Mishra	Jan Kranti Dal
1969	Satya Narain Dudani	Bharatiya Jana Sangh
1972	Satya Narain Singh	Indian National Congress
1977	Satya Narain Dudani	Janata Party
1980	Binod Bihari Mahato	Jharkhand Mukti Morcha
1985	Satya Narain Dudani	Bharatiya Janata Party
1990	Binod Bihari Mahato	Jharkhand Mukti Morcha
1995	Saba Ahmad	Jharkhand Mukti Morcha
2000	Saba Ahmad	Rashtriya Janata Dal
Jharkhand Legislative Assembly
2005	Mathura Prasad Mahato	Jharkhand Mukti Morcha
2009	Mathura Prasad Mahato	Jharkhand Mukti Morcha
2014	Raj Kishore Mahato	All Jharkhand Students Union
2019	Mathura Prasad Mahato	Jharkhand Mukti Morcha
2024	Mathura Prasad Mahato	Jharkhand Mukti Morcha

== Election results ==
=== Assembly election 2024 ===
2024 Jharkhand Legislative Assembly election: Tundi
Party	Candidate	Votes	%	±%
JMM	Mathura Prasad Mahato	95,527	41.29%	▲3.80
BJP	Vikash Kumar Mahato	69,924	30.22%	▲5.99
JLKM	Motilal Mahto	44,464	19.22%	New
Independent	Dipnarayan Singh	3,175	1.37%	New
Independent	Gauri Shankar Mahto	3,073	1.33%	New
Independent	Priyatosh Kumar Pathak	2,546	1.10%	New
SP	Ajmul Ansari	2,205	0.95%	New
NOTA	None of the Above	682	0.29%	▼1.02
Margin of victory		25,603	11.07%	▼2.19
Turnout		2,31,383	72.43%	▲3.43
Registered electors		3,19,441		▲13.89
JMM hold		Swing	▲3.80	

=== Assembly election 2019 ===
2019 Jharkhand Legislative Assembly election: Tundi
Party	Candidate	Votes	%	±%
JMM	Mathura Prasad Mahato	72,552	37.49%	▲6.71
Communist Party Of India	Surendra Sharma	1,160	0.6%	New
BJP	Vikram Pandey	46,893	24.23%	New
JVM(P)	Saba Ahmad	25,547	13.20%	▼12.42
AJSU	Raj Kishore Mahato	15,946	8.24%	▼23.17
AAP	Dip Narayan Singh	7,702	3.98%	New
Independent	Gyan Ranjan Sinha	7,472	3.86%	New
JD(U)	Kishor Kumar Tiwary	5,067	2.62%	New
NOTA	None of the Above	2,550	1.32%	▼0.47
Margin of victory		25,659	13.26%	▲12.62
Turnout		1,93,536	69.00%	▼0.56
Registered electors		2,80,475		▲10.50
JMM gain from AJSU		Swing	▲6.07	

=== Assembly election 2014 ===
2014 Jharkhand Legislative Assembly election: Tundi
Party	Candidate	Votes	%	±%
AJSU	Raj Kishore Mahato	55,466	31.41%	New
JMM	Mathura Prasad Mahato	54,340	30.78%	▲0.74
JVM(P)	Saba Ahmad	45,229	25.62%	▼3.75
INC	Bhaskar Prasad Ojha	8,781	4.97%	New
Independent	Mustafa Khan	2,492	1.41%	New
Independent	Lakshmi Rajak	2,111	1.20%	New
Independent	Dhano Soren	1,869	1.06%	New
NOTA	None of the Above	3,159	1.79%	New
Margin of victory		1,126	0.64%	▼0.04
Turnout		1,76,568	69.56%	▲11.67
Registered electors		2,53,824		▲8.22
AJSU gain from JMM		Swing	▲1.37	

=== Assembly election 2009 ===
2009 Jharkhand Legislative Assembly election: Tundi
Party	Candidate	Votes	%	±%
JMM	Mathura Prasad Mahato	40,787	30.04%	▼7.80
JVM(P)	Saba Ahmad	39,869	29.36%	New
BJP	Pradeep Kumar Agarwal	23,199	17.09%	▲1.47
AITC	Bhaskar Prasad Ojha	10,049	7.40%	New
Independent	Haldhar Mahato	2,086	1.54%	New
BSP	Pratima Devi	1,658	1.22%	▼2.32
Independent	Md. Naseem Akhtar	1,622	1.19%	New
Margin of victory		918	0.68%	▼18.16
Turnout		1,35,777	57.89%	▼3.13
Registered electors		2,34,548		▲3.93
JMM hold		Swing	▼7.80	

=== Assembly election 2005 ===
2005 Jharkhand Legislative Assembly election: Tundi
Party	Candidate	Votes	%	±%
JMM	Mathura Prasad Mahato	52,112	37.84%	▲13.65
RJD	Saba Ahmad	26,175	19.01%	▼5.34
BJP	Subhash Chatterjee	21,501	15.61%	▲12.82
INC	Uday Kumar Singh	14,851	10.78%	▼12.48
AJSU	Santosh Kumar Mahto	6,636	4.82%	New
BSP	Rameshwer Prasad Mahto	4,876	3.54%	▲2.35
Jharkhand Vananchal Congress	Surender Singh	3,166	2.30%	New
Margin of victory		25,937	18.83%	▲18.68
Turnout		1,37,719	61.02%	▲2.66
Registered electors		2,25,687		▲27.84
JMM gain from RJD		Swing	▲13.50	

=== Assembly election 2000 ===
2000 Bihar Legislative Assembly election: Tundi
Party	Candidate	Votes	%	±%
RJD	Saba Ahmad	25,079	24.34%	New
JMM	Mathura Prasad Mahato	24,925	24.19%	New
INC	Uday Kumar Singh	23,968	23.26%	New
SAP	Raj Kishore Mahato	21,853	21.21%	New
BJP	Vijay Kumar Jha	2,878	2.79%	New
BSP	Kajal Kumar Dutta	1,228	1.19%	New
SP	Abdul Kudus	1,063	1.03%	New
Margin of victory		154	0.15%	
Turnout		1,03,025	59.53%	
Registered electors		1,76,542		
RJD win (new seat)				

== See also ==
- Vidhan Sabha
- List of states of India by type of legislature
