= Ghatshila Assembly constituency =

Constituency of the Jharkhand legislative assembly in India

Coordinates: 22.585°N 86.479°E

Ghatsila
- Constituency No. 45 for the Jharkhand Legislative Assembly

Constituency details
- Country: India
- Region: East India
- State: Jharkhand
- District: East Singhbhum
- Lok Sabha constituency: Jamshedpur
- Established: 2000
- Total electors: 242,798
- Reservation: ST

Member of Legislative Assembly
- 5th Jharkhand Legislative Assembly
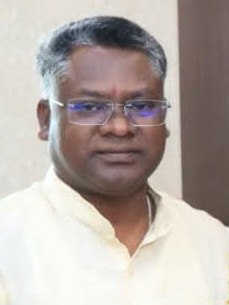
- Incumbent Somesh Chandra Soren
- Party: JMM
- Alliance: MGB

Ghatsila Assembly constituency is an assembly constituency in the Indian state of Jharkhand. Before 2000, this constituency was in Bihar.

Most successful parties after separate Jharkhand state.
1. JMM (60.0%)
2. INC (20.0%)
3. BJP (20.0%)

== Overview ==
According to the Delimitation of Parliamentary and Assembly Constituencies Order, 2008 of the Election Commission of India, Ghatshila Assembly constituency covers Ghatsila police station and Musabnai police station (excluding Palasbani, Asta Koyali, Nunia, Kumarasol, Barakanjiya, Bomaro Bangoriya and Damudih gram panchayats). It is a reserved constituency for Scheduled Tribes. Ghatshila (Vidhan Sabha constituency) is a part of Jamshedpur (Lok Sabha constituency). It was unreserved seat in 1957 Bihar assembly elections.

== Members of the Legislative Assembly ==
Election	Member	Party
Bihar Legislative Assembly
Before 1957: see Ghatsila cum Baharagora constituency
1957	Shishir Kumar Mahato	Jharkhand Party
1962	Basta Soren	Communist Party of India
1967	D. Murmu	Indian National Congress
1969	Yadunath Baskey	Independent
1972	Tika Ram Majhi	Communist Party of India
1977	Tika Ram Majhi	Communist Party of India
1980	Tika Ram Majhi	Communist Party of India
1985	Karan Chandra Mardi	Indian National Congress
1990	Surya Singh Besra	Independent
1995	Pradeep Kumar Balmuchu	Indian National Congress
2000	Pradeep Kumar Balmuchu	Indian National Congress
Jharkhand Legislative Assembly
2005	Pradeep Kumar Balmuchu	Indian National Congress
2009	Ramdas Soren	Jharkhand Mukti Morcha
2014	Laxman Tudu	Bharatiya Janata Party
2019	Ramdas Soren	Jharkhand Mukti Morcha
2024	Ramdas Soren	Jharkhand Mukti Morcha
2025^	Somesh Chandra Soren	Jharkhand Mukti Morcha

^by-election

== Election results ==
=== 2025 by-election ===
Jharkhand Legislative Assembly by-election, 2025: Ghatsila
Party	Candidate	Votes	%	±%
JMM	Somesh Chandra Soren	104,396	54.78	
BJP	Babulal Soren	66,335	34.63	
JLKM	Ramdas Murmu	11,563	6.04	
NOTA	None of the Above	2,768	1.45	
Majority		38,601	20.15	
Turnout		256,352	74.63	
JMM hold		Swing		

=== Assembly election 2024 ===
2024 Jharkhand Legislative Assembly election: Ghatsila
Party	Candidate	Votes	%	±%
JMM	Ramdas Soren	98,356	51.50	▲14.14
BJP	Babulal Soren	75,910	39.75	▲6.34
JLKM	Ramdas Murmu	8,092	4.24	New
Independent	Sunil Kumar Murmu	1,272	0.67	New
NOTA	None of the Above	2,868	1.50	▲1.14
Margin of victory		22,446	11.75	▲7.80
Turnout		1,90,966	76.30	▲6.26
Registered electors		2,50,295		▲3.09
JMM hold		Swing	▲14.14	

=== Assembly election 2019 ===
2019 Jharkhand Legislative Assembly election: Ghatsila
Party	Candidate	Votes	%	±%
JMM	Ramdas Soren	63,531	37.36	▲8.84
BJP	Lakhan Chandra Mardi	56,807	33.41	▲0.93
AJSU	Pradeep Kumar Balmuchu	31,910	18.77	New
Independent	Biswanath Singh	2,293	1.35	New
JPP	Surya Singh Besra	2,255	1.33	New
CPI	Kanai Murmu	1,868	1.10	▼0.43
JVM(P)	Dr. Sunita Debdoot Soren	1,738	1.02	▼0.19
NOTA	None of the Above	621	0.37	▼1.48
Margin of victory		6,724	3.95	▼0.01
Turnout		1,70,041	70.03	▲0.78
Registered electors		2,42,798		▲4.02
JMM gain from BJP		Swing	▲4.88	

=== Assembly election 2014 ===
2014 Jharkhand Legislative Assembly election: Ghatsila
Party	Candidate	Votes	%	±%
BJP	Laxman Tudu	52,506	32.48	▲9.96
JMM	Ramdas Soren	46,103	28.52	▼1.67
INC	Cinderella Balmuchu	36,672	22.69	▼6.57
Independent	Kanhu Samant	12,194	7.54	New
CPI	Dulal Chandra Hansda	2,468	1.53	▼0.78
Independent	Bimal Munda	2,003	1.24	New
JVM(P)	Gita Murmu	1,953	1.21	New
NOTA	None of the Above	2,985	1.85	New
Margin of victory		6,403	3.96	▲3.02
Turnout		1,61,654	69.26	▲5.25
Registered electors		2,33,408		▲17.81
BJP gain from JMM		Swing	▲2.29	

=== Assembly election 2009 ===
2009 Jharkhand Legislative Assembly election: Ghatsila
Party	Candidate	Votes	%	±%
JMM	Ramdas Soren	38,283	30.19	New
INC	Pradeep Kumar Balmuchu	37,091	29.25	▼10.70
BJP	Surya Singh Besra	28,561	22.52	▲5.78
AJSU	Kanhu Samant	10,978	8.66	▼3.25
CPI	Ganesh Chandra Murmu	2,925	2.31	New
Independent	Sadhu Munda	2,002	1.58	New
Independent	Dukhi Ram Mardi	1,172	0.92	New
Margin of victory		1,192	0.94	▼11.96
Turnout		1,26,804	64.00	▲0.43
Registered electors		1,98,121		▼1.22
JMM gain from INC		Swing	▼9.76	

=== Assembly election 2005 ===
2005 Jharkhand Legislative Assembly election: Ghatsila
Party	Candidate	Votes	%	±%
INC	Pradeep Kumar Balmuchu	50,936	39.95	▼9.37
Independent	Ramdas Soren	34,489	27.05	New
BJP	Ramdas Hansda	21,352	16.75	▼1.53
AJSU	Kanhu Samant	15,187	11.91	New
Independent	Bimal Kumar Singh	1,937	1.52	New
AITC	Govinda Mardi	1,314	1.03	New
Independent	Putu Singh	1,184	0.93	New
Margin of victory		16,447	12.90	▼18.14
Turnout		1,27,506	63.57	▲4.92
Registered electors		2,00,566		▲14.55
INC hold		Swing	▼9.37	

=== Assembly election 2000 ===
2000 Bihar Legislative Assembly election: Ghatsila
Party	Candidate	Votes	%	±%
INC	Pradeep Kumar Balmuchu	50,645	49.31	New
BJP	Baiju Murmu	18,769	18.28	New
CPI	Bablu Murmu	16,353	15.92	New
JMM	Shankar Chand Hembram	9,891	9.63	New
JPP	Kanhu Samant	2,777	2.70	New
RJD	Jaipal Manjhi	2,563	2.50	New
Independent	Sita Ram Tudu	1,583	1.54	New
Margin of victory		31,876	31.04	
Turnout		1,02,701	59.47	
Registered electors		1,75,088		
INC win (new seat)				

== See also ==
- Vidhan Sabha
- List of states of India by type of legislature
