= Binod Bihari Mahato =

Indian politician

Binod Bihari Mahto
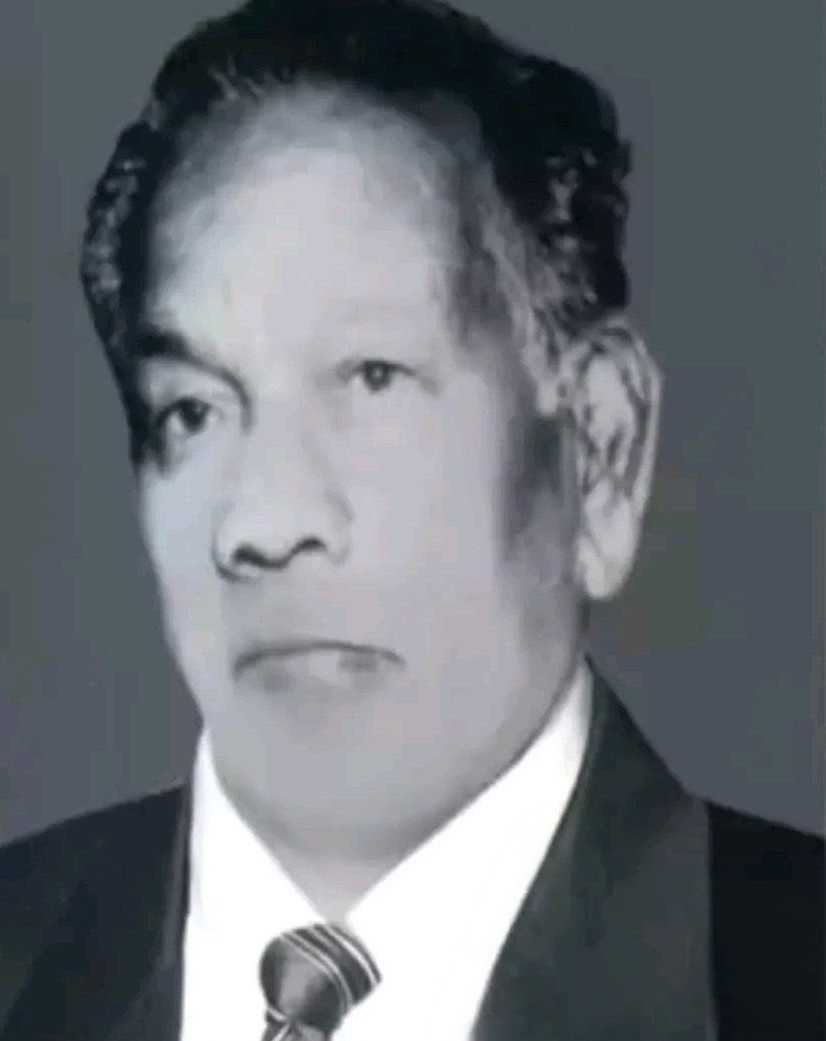

Member of Parliament, Lok Sabha
- In office 1991–1991
- Preceded by: Ramdas Singh
- Succeeded by: Ravindra Kumar Pandey
- Constituency: Giridih

Member of Bihar Legislative Assembly
- In office 1990–1991
- Constituency: Tundi
- In office 1985–1990
- Constituency: Sindri
- In office 1980–1985
- Constituency: Tundi

Personal details
- Born: 23 September 1923 Badawaha, Bihar and Orissa Province (now Jharkhand), British India
- Died: 18 December 1991 (aged 68) Delhi, India
- Party: Communist Party of India; Jharkhand Mukti Morcha
- Spouse: Fulmani Devi
- Children: 7 (including Raj Kishore Mahato)
- Parents: Mahendra Mahato (father); Mandakini Devi (mother)
- Relatives: Srinath Mahato (brother)
- Education: Ranchi College, Law College Patna
- Profession: barrister; activist; politician

Binod Bihari Mahato (23 September 1923 – 18 December 1991) was an advocate and politician. He co-founded Jharkhand Mukti Morcha in 1972 and was a leader of the movement for the establishment of the separate state of Jharkhand. He was a member of Bihar Vidhan Sabha in 1980, 1985 and 1990; he was also a member of the Lok Sabha from Giridih in 1991.

== Early life ==
Binod Bihari Mahato was born on 23 September 1923 in Badadaha village, in the Baliapur division of Dhanbad district. He was born into the Kudmi community. His father, Mahendra Mahato, was a farmer, and his mother's name was Mandakini Devi. His primary education took place in Baliapur; he attended Jharia D.A.V. for middle school and Dhanbad High English School.

== Career ==
Mahato worked as a teacher, and later, got a job as a clerk in Dhanbad before deciding to become a lawyer. He studied for the Intermediate Certificate at P.K. Ray Memorial College. He graduated from Ranchi College, and received a law degree from Patna Law College. He began to practise as a lawyer in Dhanbad in 1956. He fought cases for people who were displaced because of the Bokaro Steel Plant, Bharat Coking Coal Limited, Central Coalfields, Panchet Dam, Maithon Dam and other developments.

Mahato ran for election in Jharia in 1952 but was unsuccessful. In 1971, he ran in the Dhanbad Loksabha election for the Communist Party of India and came second. He was a member of Vidhan Sabha and represented Tundi from 1980 to 1985; he later represented Sindri and Tundi in 1990, before becoming a member of Lok Sabha and representing Giridih in May 1991.

Mahato loved Jharkhand's culture. He organised competitions to promote the folk dances of Jharkhand and participated in festivals such as Gohal Puja, Tusu Parab, Jitiya, Karam Parab, Sohrai and Manasa Puja. He worked to promote the languages of Jharkhand, especially Kudmali/Kurmali, the language of Kudmi Mahato and encouraged Laxmikant Mahato, the writer of Kudmali Sahitya and Vyakran, to promote Kurmali. The writer and poet of Khortha, Srinivas Punari, was his friend. Due to these efforts, the study of Kurmali started at Ranchi University.

Mahato advocated for education. He created the slogan "Padho and Lado". He also donated money to help establish several schools and colleges.

== Shivaji Samaj ==
Due to his background, Mahato met several Kudmi in his professional work. Kudmi have their own culture and rituals, which were often performed without Brahmin. In those days Brahmincal practices were entering into Kudmi culture. Some were trying to make Kudmi Khatriya by giving them janeu, and some were suggesting Kudmi get dikhya from Brahmin. Some were saying to classify Kudmi as Vaishya. Many Kudmi were starting practices such as Tilak and Dahej which were not part of Kudmi custom, and alcoholism was increasing. To solve these problems faced by Kudmi, Mahato started an organisation called Shivaji Samaj, which worked to protect Kudmi from money-lenders and to fight social evils, in 1967. Shivaji Samaj organised rallies for backward castes and Sri Karpuri Thakur's rally for backward castes.

Shivaji Samaj worked to promote the language, festival and culture of Kudmi. The reason Mahato called the organisation Shivaji Samaj was that he admired Chhatrapati Shivaji, believing that Shivaji was Kudmi.

Eventually, Shivaji Samaj became the backbone of the Jharkhand movement. However, some people called Shivaji Samaj a terrorist organisation, and several cases were lodged against its leaders.

== Jharkhand Mukti Morcha ==
Binod Bihari Mahato was a member of the Communist Party for 25 years. He thought that the Indian National Congress and Jan Sangh were a party for feudalism and capitalism and not for Dalit castes; in his view, it would be difficult to fight for Dalit as a member of these parties.

As a result, he created Jharkhand Mukti Morcha. Under its banner, several protests took place demanding that Jharkhand become a separate state.

Mahato was a member of the Jharkhand Coordination Committee (JCC) along with Bindheswari Prasad Keshri, Sanjay Bosu Mullick, Santosh Rana, and Surya Singh Besra. The committee tried to coordinate between the different Jharkhand separatist organisations. The central government formed a committee on the Jharkhand matter in 1989, which stressed the need for greater allocation of development funds for the area.

== Personal life ==
He married Fulmani Devi. They had two daughters, Chandrawati Devi and Tarawati Devi, and five sons: Raj Kishore Mahato, Nil Kamal Mahato, Chandra Shekhar Mahato, Pradeep Kumar Mahato, and Ashok Kumar Mahato.

The Binod Bihari Mahto Koylanchal University was made to commemorate him.

== See also ==
- Jharkhand movement
