= Ram Dayal Munda =

Indian scholar and politician

Ram Dayal (23 August 1939 – 30 September 2011), known as R. D., was an Indian scholar, regional music exponent and activist. He was awarded the Padma Shri of the year 2010 for his contribution to the field of art.

He was a vice-chancellor of Ranchi University and a member of the upper house of the Indian Parliament. In 2007, he received the Sangeet Natak Akademi Award. He died in Ranchi on 30 September 2011.

== Early life ==
Ram Dayal was born in the tribal village Diuri in the Ranchi district of Bihar (Now in Jharkhand) India.

Ram Dayal Munda got his primary education at the Luther Mission School in Amlesa. He obtained his secondary education in the sub divisional town of Khunti. He developed interests on anthropology, linguistics during assisting academicians on their work on tribal leader Birsa Munda. He did his master degree in anthropology from Ranchi University in 1963. Then he pursued PhD on the study of Indic group of the Austroasiatic languages under guidance of Norman Zide in the University of Chicago. and was subsequently appointed in the faculty of Department of South Asian Studies. Later, at the request of then Vice-Chancellor, Kumar Suresh Singh, he started a Department of Tribal and Regional Languages.

== Activism ==
The department was the rallying point for all social politico activists engaged in finding out ways to change the internal colonial situation the people of Jharkhand were faced with. Many students passed out from the department and formed a body "All Jharkhand Students Union" (AJSU) pushing for formation of an intellectual base for the maintenance of the Jharkhand Movement which was already going at that time. This indirectly contributed to Munda's appointment as Vice-Chancellor of Ranchi University in 1985. As a result, he became a medium of political dialogue between the state and the movement of the people. Therefore, the Committee on Jharkhand Matters was formed to initiate the formation of the new state of Jharkhand.

Electoral history of R. D. Munda
Election	House	Constituency	Party	Votes	%	Result
2004	Lok Sabha	Khunti	JD(U)	21,213	4.32	Lost
1998	Lok Sabha	Khunti	JMM	58,548	12.65	Lost
1996	Lok Sabha	Singhbhum	JPP	37,605	8.14	Lost
1991	Lok Sabha	Ranchi	Ind	13,161	2.85	Lost
2009	Jharkhand Legislative Assembly	Tamar	INC	12,359	13.85	Lost

== Retirement and later work ==
Munda retired in 1999 but he continued to his involvement with the cultural mobilisation of the people. He was also the policy maker at the UN Working Group on Indigenous People at Geneva and the UN Forum of Indigenous Issues in New York, as a senior official of the ICITP, all India tribal led and managed movement.

Munda has written several books and was a consultant and participant in important issues of the adivasi people of the country. He represented his country in the Festival of India in the USSR, and other cultural events in China, Japan and South East Asia.

== Awards ==
Munda was awarded Sangeet Natak Akademi in 2007 and Padma Shri in 2010 by the government of India to recognise his contributions.

== List of publications ==
1. Four Mundari Jadur Songs in THE EAST WEST REVIEW 2(3), 1966(with Norman Zide).
2. HISIR (Necklace, Modern Mundari Songs), Sahkari Prakashan, Ranchi, 1967
3. SELED (Miscellaneous Poems in Mundari, Nagpuri and Hindi), Sahkari Prakashan, Ranchi, 1967
4. PROTO-KHERWARIAN SOUND SYSTEM, Department of South Asian Languages and Civilization, University of Chicago, 1967
5. Songs on Birsa and his Movement in Journal of Social Research 12, Department of Anthropology, Ranchi University, 1969 (with Norman Zide)
6. Descriptive Dialogue Songs in Mundari in M.C. Pradhan, P.K. Mishra and D.J. Shastri(Eds.) ANTHROPOLOGY AND ARCHEOLOGY, Oxford University Press, Bombay, 1969 (with Norman Zide).
7. Aspects of the Mundari Verb in Indian Linguistics 30, 1969.
8. Structural influence of Bengali Vaishnav songs on Traditional Mundari songs in JOURNAL OF SOCIAL RESEARCH 13, Department of Anthropology, Ranchi University, 1970.
9. MUNDARI GĪTKĀR, SHRI BUDU BABU AUR UNKI RACHNAE, Adivasi Sahitya Parishad, Ranchi, 1974.
10. OCEAN OF LAUGHTER, English Translation of Hāsyārnava (The Sanskrit Play by Jagadishwara Bhattacharya), Writers Workshop, Calcutta, 1975 (with David Nelson).
11. STRUCTURAL FEATURES OF THE VAISHNAV SONGS OF PARGANA BANGALI, PhD Thesis, Department of Linguistics, University of Chicago, 1975.
12. KALYĀNĪ, English translation of the KALYĀNĪ (Hindi Novel by Jainendra Kumar), Department of South Asian Studies, University of Minnesota, Minneapolis, 1976(with Paul Staneslow and Mark Johnson).
13. Some Formal Features of Mundari Traditional Poetry in Philip Jenner, Lawrence Thompson and Stanly Starosta (Eds) AUSTRO ASIATIC STUDIES, University of Hawaii Press, 1976
14. HOLY MAN FROM JAMANIA, English Translation of the Hindi novel JAMANIA KĀ BĀBĀ by Nagarjuna, Writers Workshop, Calcutta, 1977 (with Paul Staneslow).
15. Word Deformation in Mundari Song Texts in Peter Ponette (Ed) MUNDA WORLD, Catholic Press, Ranchi 1978(with Norman Zide).
16. KUCHH NAE NĀGPURĪ GĪT (Songs in Nagpuri), Nagpuri Sahitya Parishad, Ranchi, 1978.
17. MUNDĀRĪ VYĀKARAN (Mundari Grammar), Mundari Sahitya Parishad, Ranchi, 1979.
18. DHRUWA SWAMINI, English Translation of Hindi Play by Jaishankar Prasad, Department of South Asia Studies, University of Minnesota, Minneapolis. Also in JOURNAL OF SOUTH ASIAN LITERATURE 14, Michigan State University Press, 1979 (with Paul Staneslow).
19. Tribal Development in JHARKHAND in P. Das Sharma (Eds) PASSING SCENES IN CHOTANAGPUR, Maitree Publications, Ranchi, 1980.
20. EEA NAWA KAANIKO (Seven New Stories), Mundari Sahitya Parishad, Ranchi, 1980.
21. TITLI, English Translation of the Hindi Novel by Jaishankar Prasad, Department of South Asia Studies, University of Minnesota, Minneapolis, 1980(with Paul Staneslow).
22. NADĪ AUR USKE SAMBANDHĪ TATHĀ ANYA NAGĪT, Jharkhand Sahitya Parishad, Ranchi, 1980.
23. THE SUN CHARIOTEER, English Translation of Hindi long poem RASHMIRATHI by Ramdhari Singh Dinkar, Department of South Asia Studies, University on Minnesota, 1981 (with Paul Staneslow and David Nelson).
24. LANGUAGE OF POETRY, Classical Publication, Delhi, 1981.
25. BIRSA MUNDA, Hindi Translation of the BENGALI BIRSA MUNDA by Mahasweta Devi, Ekta Prakashan, Chaibasa, 1981. Second edition, Sail Rakab Puthi Centre, Calcutta, 2000.
26. WAPASI, PUNARMILAN AUR ANYA NAGĪT, Jharkhand Sahitya Parishad, 1985.
27. ALL JHARKHAND STUDENTS UNION KA SAMVIDHĀN, Ranchi, AJSU, Ranchi, 1986(with S. Basu Malik, Suraj Singh Besra and Deosharan Bhagat).
28. MEMORANDUM OF JHARKHAND COORDINATION COMMITTEE, JCC, Ranchi, 1987 (with B.P.Keshari, Santosh Rana, S. Basu Malik, and Suraj Singh Besra) .
29. JHARKHAND VĀRTĀ, Position Paper for talks between the JCC and the Central Government, JCC, Ranchi, 1989 (with B.P.Keshri).
30. Tribal Identity: The Crisis and the Way Out in Karuna. M. Braganza and S. Peeradina (Eds) CULTURAL FORCES SHAPIG INDIA, (Macmillan) Bangalore, 1989. Also in RELIGION AND SOCIETY 36, Bangalore, 1989.
31. Jharkhand Movement, Retrospect and Prospect in JOURNAL OF SOCIAL CHANGE, Council for Social Development, Delhi, 1990.
32. JHARKHAND PEOPLES PARTY KA SAMVIDHĀN, JPP Office, Ranchi, 1990 (with Suraj Singh Besra and Devsharan Bhagat).
33. Dispossession and Exploitation of Tribal Peoples Through Communication Manipulation, with Special reference to Jharkhand in RELIGION AND SOCIETY 38, 1991
34. Recent Development in Jharkhand Movement in INDIA INTERNATIONAL QUTERLY, Indian International Centre, 1992.
35. Introduction to Indigenous and Tribal Solidarity, ICITP, Delhi, 1997.
36. BHURIA COMMITTEE REPORT AUR JHARKHAND KI SHETRA ME USKĀ KĀRYĀNVAYAN, Jharkhand Prakashan, Ranchi, 1997.
37. Abstract on Socio-Cultural Rights: Language, Education and Cultural Identity in B.K. Roy Burman and B.G. Verghese (Eds) ASPIRING TO BE, Delhi, Konark Publication, 1995.
38. An Insiders View of the Struggle for Jharkhand in JAI JHARKHAND, Coimbatore, Sarini, 1999.
39. Adivasi Identity in RISING FACISM, Delhi, Update Collection, 2000.
40. ADI DHARAM, Religious Beliefs of Adivasi of India, Sarini, Coimbatore, 2000. Hindi Version, Jharkhand Prakashan, Ranchi, 2001. Bangali, Sail Rakab Puthi Centre, 2002.
41. ADIVASI ASTITVA AUR JHARKHANDI ASMITA KE SAWĀL, Prakashan Sansthan, Delhi, 2001.
42. ADANDI BONGA (WIVĀH MANTRA), Jharkhand Prakashan, Ranchi, 2001 (with Ratan Singh Manki).
43. JI-TONOL (MAN BANDHAN), Jharkhand Prakashan, Ranchi, 2002.
44. JI-RANAŖA (MAN BICHHURAN), Jharkhand Prakashan, Ranchi, 2001.
45. ENEON (JĀGARAN), Jharkhand Prakashan, Ranchi, 2002.
46. BA (H) BONGA (SARHUL MANTRA), Mundari- Hindi Version, Jharkhand Prakashan, Ranchi, 2002.
47. REPORT OF THE WORKING GROUP ON EMPOWERMENT OF THE SCHEDULE TRIBES DURING THE TENTH FIVE YEAR PLAN, Planning Commission, Government of India, Delhi, 2002.
48. GONOE? PAROMEN BONGA (SHRĀDDHA MANTRA), Mundari Hindi Version, Sail Rakab Puthi Centre, Calcutta, 2003(with Ratan Singh Manki).
49. JHARKHAND MOVEMENT, Indian Social Institute, Delhi, 2000 (with S. Basu Malik).
50. GLOBALISATION AND THE CHALLENGES OF TRIBAL DEVELOPMENT ( Dr. Durgabai Deshmukh Memorial Lecture), Council for Social Development, New Delhi, 2005.
51. ADI DHARAM, BHĀRATIYA ADIVĀSIYAON KI DHĀRMIK ASTHĀYEN, New Delhi (Rajkamal Prakashan), 2009.
52. SOSOBONGA (The Ritual of reciting the Creation Story and the Asur Story prevalent among the Mundas, Mundari-English version), adivaani and RUMBUL, Kolkata, 2015 (with Ratan Singh Manki)
53. SOSOBONGA (BHELWA PŪJAN) PUNARNAVISRIT, in press.

== In popular culture ==
- He features in the stories in the book Sylvan Tales: Stories from the Munda Country, written by Samar Basu Mullick.
- His motorcycle tour of Jharkhand with his friend B.P. Kesari has been neatly captured in the latter's travel memoir Main Jharkhand Mein Hoon.
- In 2017, documentary filmmakers Biju Toppo and Meghnath brought out 'Naachi Se Baanchi- Those who dance will survive', a documentary movie on the life and the works of Dr Ram Dayal Munda.

Academic offices
Preceded by Sachidanand	Permanent 20th Vice-Chancellor of the Ranchi University; 1987–1988	Succeeded by Lal Saheb Singh
