= Mathura Prasad Mahato =

Indian politician

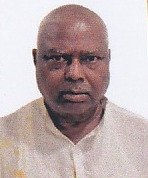

Cabinet Minister, Government of Jharkhand
- In office 13 July 2013 – 28 December 2014
- Chief Minister: Hemant Soren
- Ministry and Departments: Revenue; Land Reforms

Member of the Jharkhand Legislative Assembly
- Incumbent
- Assumed office 2019
- Preceded by: Raj Kishore Mahato, AJSU
- Constituency: Tundi
- In office 2005–2014
- Preceded by: Saba Ahmad, RJD
- Succeeded by: Raj Kishore Mahato, AJSU
- Constituency: Tundi

Personal details
- Party: Jharkhand Mukti Morcha

Mathura Prasad Mahato is an Indian politician from the Jharkhand Mukti Morcha. He is a member of the Jharkhand Legislative Assembly, elected three times in 2005, 2009 and 2019 from Tundi. He was the Minister of Revenue and Land Reforms in the First Hemant Soren government. He was the JMM and INDIA alliance candidate for Giridih in the 2024 Indian general election. He belongs to the Kudmi Mahato community.
