= Chapalendu Bhattacharyyia =

Indian politician (born 1919)

Member of Parliament, Lok Sabha
- In office 1971–1977
- Preceded by: Imteyaz Ahmad
- Succeeded by: Ramdas Singh
- Constituency: Giridih

Personal details
- Born: 28 January 1919
- Party: Indian National Congress

Chapalendu Bhattacharyyia (born 28 January 1919, date of death unknown) was an Indian politician. He was a member of parliament, representing Giridih in the Lok Sabha the lower house of India's Parliament as a member of the Indian National Congress.
