= Luguburu Ghantabari =

Santhal pilgrimage and festival celebrated in India

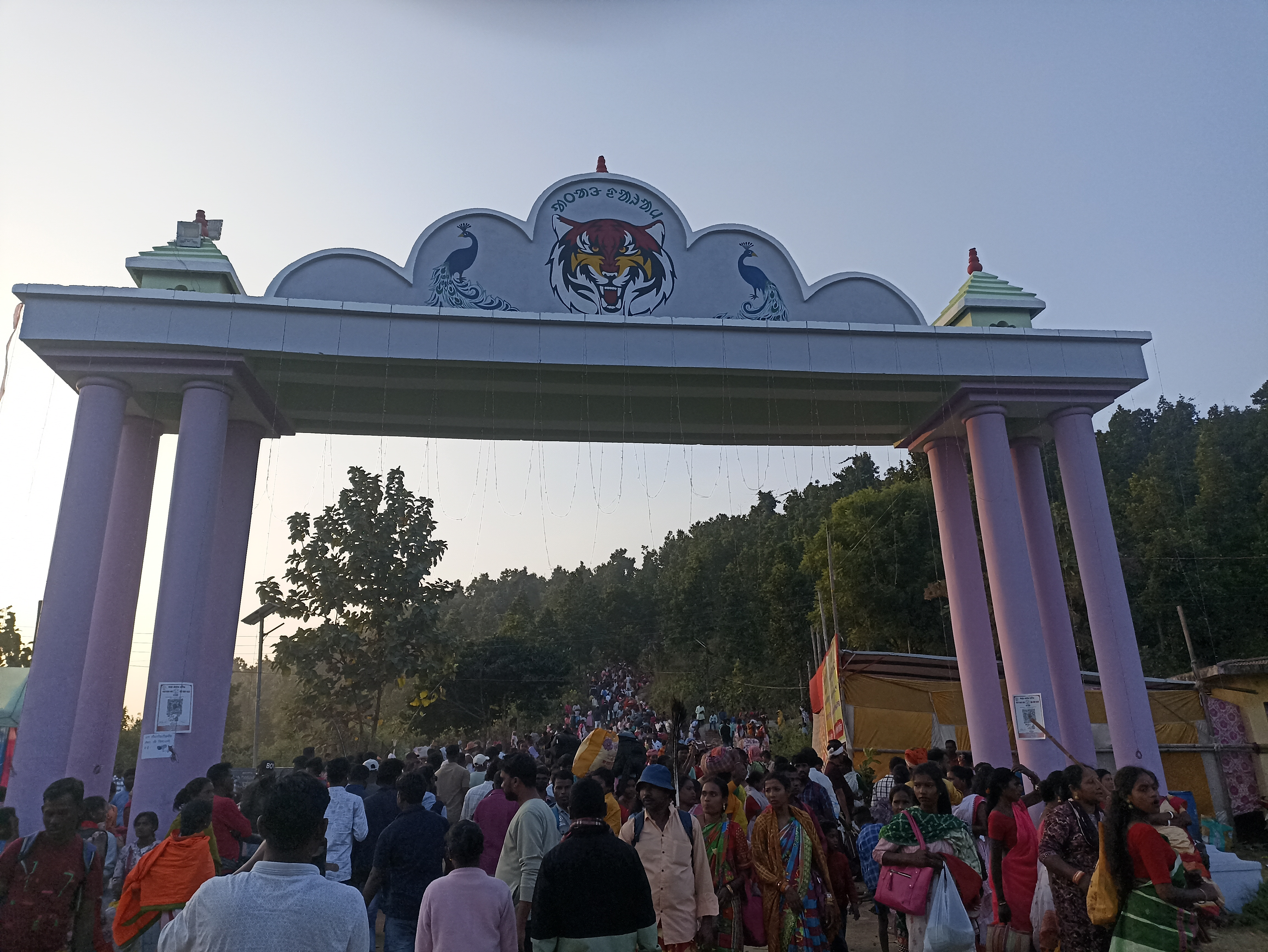
- Status: Active
- Genre: Religious, cultural
- Begins: Kartik Purnima (November)
- Frequency: Annual
- Venue: Luguburu Ghantabari Dharamgarh, Lalpania
- Locations: Gomia, Bokaro, Jharkhand, India
- Country: India
- Years active: Since 2000
- Inaugurated: 2000
- Participants: Santhals
- Major events: Rituals, Prayers, Fair
- Organiser: Luguburu Ghantabari Dharamgarh Committee

The Luguburu Ghantabari is an annual religious event for the Santhal tribal community, held in Lalpania, in Bokaro, Jharkhand. It takes place every year during Kartik Purnima and is centered around the Luguburu Ghantabari Dharamgarh, a revered religious site dedicated to Lugu Baba. The event attracts large numbers of Santhal devotees from across India and abroad, particularly from West Bengal, Bihar, Orissa, Nepal and Bangladesh also.

== Historical significance ==
Luguburu Ghantabari is steeped in Santhali tradition and faith and is believed to date back centuries. The site holds historical importance for the Santhal community, symbolizing their culture, spirituality, and connection with nature. The gathering serves not only as a religious ritual but also as a platform for preserving and promoting Santhal cultural heritage. The fair was re-established in 2000 and has grown in prominence ever since.

== Religious activities ==
The religious aspect of the fair involves rituals and prayers dedicated to Lugu Baba, a deity worshiped by the Santhals. The worship takes place in a natural cave situated at the top of Lugu Hill, surrounded by scenic landscapes and dense forests. Devotees often embark on a long trek to reach the cave for the darshan (viewing) of Lugu Baba. The rituals include traditional offerings and prayers for the well-being of the community.

== Cultural and Social Significance ==
In addition to its religious significance, the fair serves as an important cultural event, showcasing Santhali music, dance, and traditions. It also provides a platform for tribal communities to discuss social issues and strategies for promoting Santhal culture and heritage. In recent years, political leaders, including the Chief Minister of Jharkhand, have actively participated in the event, reinforcing its importance.
