= Chandra Prakash Choudhary =

Indian politician

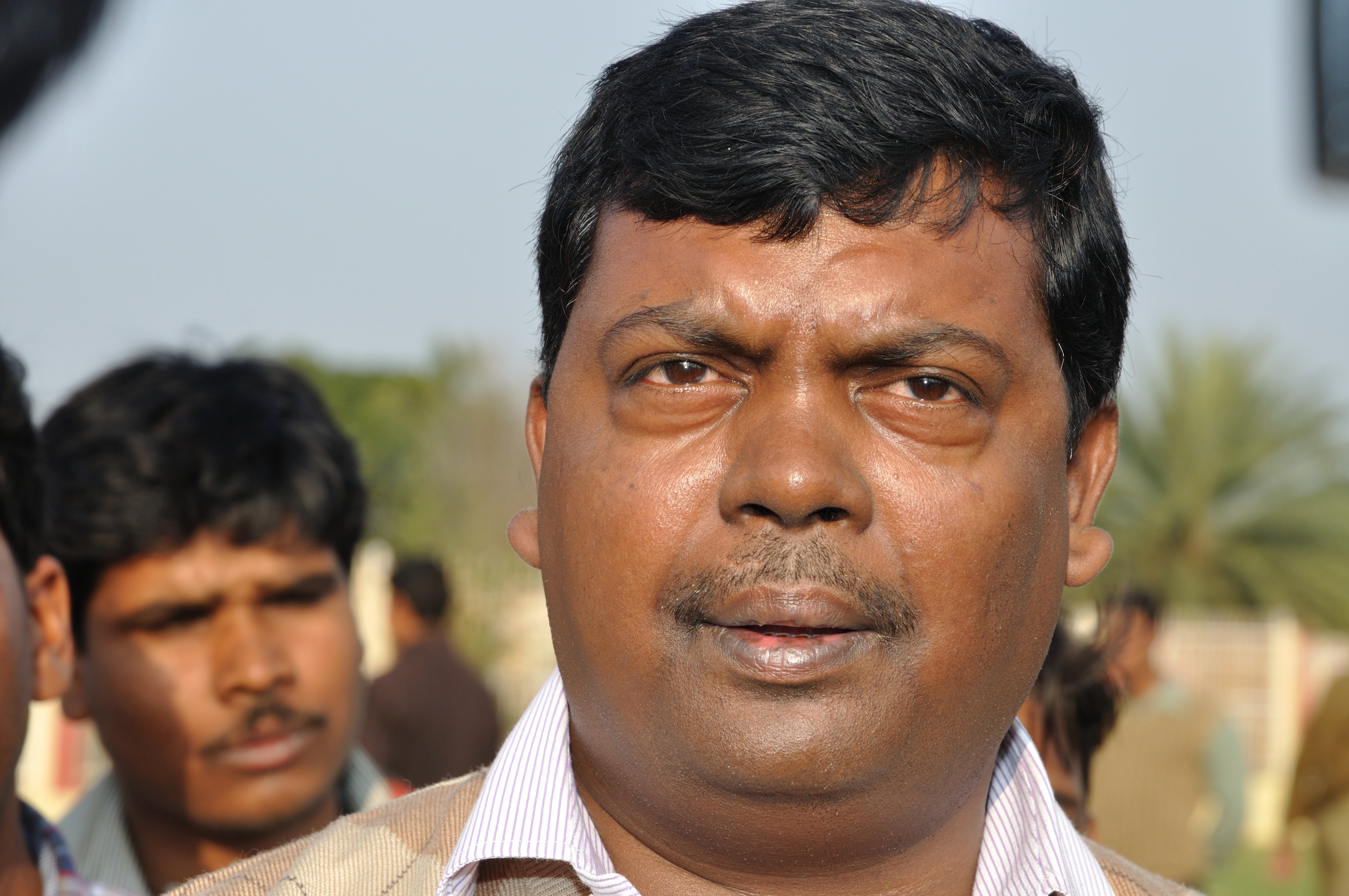

Member of Parliament, Lok Sabha
- Incumbent
- Assumed office 23 May 2019
- Preceded by: Ravindra Kumar Pandey
- Constituency: Giridih

Senior Vice President of AJSU party
- President: Sudesh Mahato
- Preceded by: position established

Minister of Water Resources Minister of Drinking Water & Sanitation, Jharkhand
- In office 28 December 2014 – 4 June 2019
- Chief Minister: Raghubar Das

Minister of Disaster Management, Jharkhand
- In office 28 December 2014 – 20 February 2015
- Chief Minister: Raghubar Das
- Succeeded by: Chandreshwar Prasad Singh

Minister of Emergency department, Jharkhand
- In office 11 September 2010 – 8 January 2013
- Chief Minister: Arjun Munda

Member of Legislative Assembly, Jharkhand
- In office 27 February 2005 – 23 May 2019
- Preceded by: Babulal Marandi
- Succeeded by: Mamta Devi
- Constituency: Ramgarh

Personal details
- Born: 18 August 1967 (age 59) Chitarpur, Jharkhand, India
- Party: All Jharkhand Students Union
- Children: Sooraj Choudhary, Kumar Piyush, Sonal Priya Choudhary
- Occupation: Politician
- As of 26 August 2019

Chandra Prakash Choudhary (born 18 August 1967; Hindi pronunciation: [t͡ʃən̪d̪ɾə pɾəkaːʃ t͡ʃɔːd̪ʱ.ɾiː]) is an Indian politician and member of Lok Sabha from Giridih constituency. He is a senior vice president of AJSU party and a 3 time MLA from Ramgarh Vidhan Sabha constituency (2005–19). He has also served as a Minister for Water Resources in the Raghubar Das government.

He is a Kurmi leader and hails from Sandi village located in Chitarpur block of Ramgarh district. He has close ties with AJSU President Sudesh Mahto. Both his wife Sunita Choudhary and close associate Lambodar Mahto are Ex MLAs from Jharkhand legislative assembly.

== Positions held ==
Chandra Prakash Choudhary has held several important positions throughout his political career. He was elected to the 18th Lok Sabha in June 2024 and has since served as a Member of the Committee on Labour, Textiles, and Skill Development since 26 September 2024. He is also a Member of the Consultative Committee for the Ministry of Steel.

From 9 October 2019, he has been a Member of the Joint Committee on Salaries and Allowances of Members of Parliament and a Member of the Standing Committee on Water Resources since 13 September 2019. He was elected to the 17th Lok Sabha in May 2019.

At the state level, Chandra Prakash Choudhary served as the Speaker of the Jharkhand Legislative Assembly from 2013 to 2014. He held the position of Cabinet Minister in the Government of Jharkhand from 2005 to 2013 and again from 2014 to 2019. He was a Member of the Jharkhand Legislative Assembly for three terms between 2005 and 2019.
