= Nageshwar Prasad Sinha =

Member of Parliament, Lok Sabha
- In office 1952–1957
- Succeeded by: Quazi S. A. Matin
- Constituency: Giridih

Personal details
- Born: 1 December 1908
- Party: Indian National Congress
- Spouse: Chandra Prabha Debi

Nageshwar Prasad Sinha was an Indian politician. He was a member of parliament, representing Giridih in the Lok Sabha the lower house of India's Parliament as a member of the Indian National Congress.
