= Raj Kishore Mahato =

Indian politician

Member of the Jharkhand Legislative Assembly
- In office 2014–2019
- Constituency: Tundi

Member of the Lok Sabha
- In office 1991–1996
- Constituency: Giridih

Personal details
- Born: 23 September 1946
- Died: 2 December 2020 (aged 74) Dhanbad, Jharkhand, India
- Party: All Jharkhand Students Union
- Parent(s): Binod Bihari Mahato (father), Fulmani Devi (mother)
- Profession: politician

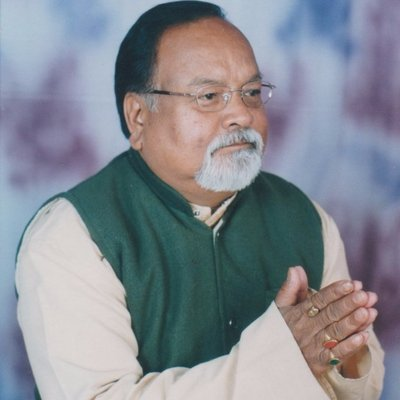
Raj Kishore Mahato

Raj Kishore Mahato was an Indian politician and member of the All Jharkhand Students Union. Mahato was a member of the Jharkhand Legislative Assembly from 2014 to 2019 from the Tundi constituency in Dhanbad district.

== Early life ==
Raj Kishore Mahato was born on 23 September 1946 to Binod Bihari Mahato and Fulmani Devi. He did his engineering degree from Indian School of Mining, Dhanbad.

== Career ==
Raj Kishore Mahato was government advocate in Patna High court from 1990 to 1991. Due to untimely death of his father, he became member of parliament from Giridih after winning election. He was president of Jharkhand ciliary sramik union from 1993. He was general secretary of Samta Party from 1998. He was president of Akhil Bharatiya Rail Yatri Sammiti. He was elected to state legislative assembly from Tundi in 2014 in the ticket of Ajsu.

He died on the 3 December 2020 from COVID-19, at the age of 75.
