= Ramgarh, Jharkhand Assembly constituency =

Constituency of the Jharkhand legislative assembly in India

Coordinates: 23.638°N 85.513°E

Ramgarh
- Constituency No. 23 for the Jharkhand Legislative Assembly

Constituency details
- Country: India
- Region: East India
- State: Jharkhand
- District: Ramgarh
- Lok Sabha constituency: Hazaribagh
- Established: 2000
- Total electors: 313312
- Reservation: None

Member of Legislative Assembly
- 5th Jharkhand Legislative Assembly
- Incumbent Mamta Devi
- Party: INC
- Alliance: MGB
- Elected year: 2024

Ramgarh Assembly constituency is an assembly constituency in the Indian state of Jharkhand.

== Members of Legislative Assembly ==
Election	Name	Party
Bihar Legislative Assembly
Before 1957: see Ramgarh cum Hazaribagh constituency
1957	Tara Prasad Bakshi	Chota Nagpur Santhal Parganas Janata Party
1957	Rameshwar Manjhi	Chota Nagpur Santhal Parganas Janata Party
1962	Tara Prasad Bakshi	Swatantra Party
1967	Tara Prasad Bakshi	Jan Kranti Dal
1969	Bodulal Agarwal	Indian National Congress
1972	Manzurul Hassan Khan	Communist Party of India
1973^	Shahdun Nisha	Communist Party of India
1977	Bishwanath Choudhary	Janata Party
1980	Arjun Ram	Jharkhand Mukti Morcha
1985	Jamuna Prasad Sharma	Indian National Congress
1990	Arjun Ram	Jharkhand Mukti Morcha
1995	Shankar Choudhary	Bharatiya Janata Party
2000	Sabir Ahmed Quaresi	Communist Party of India
Jharkhand Legislative Assembly
2001^	Babulal Marandi	Bharatiya Janata Party
2005	Chandra Prakash Choudhary	All Jharkhand Students Union
2009	Chandra Prakash Choudhary	All Jharkhand Students Union
2014	Chandra Prakash Choudhary	All Jharkhand Students Union
2019	Mamta Devi	Indian National Congress
2023^	Sunita Choudhary	All Jharkhand Students Union
2024	Mamta Devi	Indian National Congress

^by-election

== Election results ==
=== Assembly election 2024 ===
2024 Jharkhand Legislative Assembly election: Ramgarh
Party	Candidate	Votes	%	±%
INC	Mamta Devi	89,818	34.51	▼6.65
AJSU	Sunita Choudhary	83,028	31.90	▼18.91
JLKM	Paneshwar Kumar	70,979	27.27	New
BRJP	Nitesh Kumar Sinha	2,264	0.87	New
Independent	Gautam Kumar Panda	1,760	0.68	New
Independent	Pankaj Kumar	1,710	0.66	New
NOTA	None of the Above	1,450	0.56	▲0.29
Margin of victory		6,790	2.61	▼7.04
Turnout		2,60,291	72.91	▲5.10
Registered electors		3,56,993		▲6.33
INC gain from AJSU		Swing	▼16.30	

=== Assembly by-election 2023 ===
2023 Jharkhand Legislative Assembly by-election: Ramgarh
Party	Candidate	Votes	%	±%
AJSU	Sunita Choudhary	115,669	50.81	▲18.95
INC	Bajrang Mahto	93,699	41.16	▼3.55
Independent	Dhananjay Kumar Putush	2,794	1.23	New
Independent	Ramawtar Mahto	2,697	1.18	New
Independent	Ajit Kumar	2,100	0.92	New
Independent	Ranjit Mahto	1,860	0.82	New
NOTA	Nota	616	0.27	▼0.11
Margin of victory		21,970	9.65	▼3.19
Turnout		2,27,664	68.00	▼3.55
Registered electors		3,35,734		▲7.16
AJSU gain from INC		Swing	▲6.10	

=== Assembly election 2019 ===
2019 Jharkhand Legislative Assembly election: Ramgarh
Party	Candidate	Votes	%	±%
INC	Mamta Devi	99,944	44.70	▲22.31
AJSU	Sunita Choudhary	71,226	31.86	▼17.21
BJP	Rananjay Kumar @ Kuntu Babu	31,874	14.26	New
Independent	Ajit Kumar @ Bablu Kushwaha	3,271	1.46	New
CPI	Khurshid Ahmad Quraishi	2,084	0.93	▼1.36
JD(U)	Sudit Kumar Singh	1,813	0.81	New
BSP	Md Moin Uddin Ahmad	1,184	0.53	New
NOTA	None of the Above	862	0.39	New
Margin of victory		28,718	12.84	▼13.83
Turnout		2,23,577	71.36	▲0.64
Registered electors		3,13,312		▲9.82
INC gain from AJSU		Swing	▼4.36	

=== Assembly election 2014 ===
2014 Jharkhand Legislative Assembly election: Ramgarh
Party	Candidate	Votes	%	±%
AJSU	Chandra Prakash Choudhary	98,987	49.06	▲9.44
INC	Shahzada Anwar	45,169	22.39	▼0.94
JMM	Binod Kisku	25,721	12.75	▲9.17
Independent	Shankar Chowdhury	7,888	3.91	New
CPI	Bhognath Ohdar	4,627	2.29	▼0.22
CPI(ML)L	Devki Nandan Bediya	3,381	1.68	New
Independent	Dharmendra Prasad	3,042	1.51	New
NOTA	None of the Above	1,331	0.66	New
Margin of victory		53,818	26.67	▲10.38
Turnout		2,01,755	70.72	▲3.09
Registered electors		2,85,285		▲23.40
AJSU hold		Swing	▲9.44	

=== Assembly election 2009 ===
2009 Jharkhand Legislative Assembly election: Ramgarh
Party	Candidate	Votes	%	±%
AJSU	Chandra Prakash Choudhary	61,947	39.62	▲5.77
INC	Shahzada Anwar	36,472	23.33	New
BJP	Arjun Ram	30,166	19.29	▲10.38
JMM	Rananjay Kumar	5,589	3.57	▼6.88
CPI	Mangal Ohdar	3,927	2.51	▼16.62
BSP	Rajendra Nayak	3,291	2.10	New
AITC	Mohd. Alam	2,583	1.65	New
Margin of victory		25,475	16.29	▲1.58
Turnout		1,56,343	67.63	▲3.06
Registered electors		2,31,188		▼1.41
AJSU hold		Swing	▲5.77	

=== Assembly election 2005 ===
2005 Jharkhand Legislative Assembly election: Ramgarh
Party	Candidate	Votes	%	±%
AJSU	Chandra Prakash Choudhary	51,249	33.85	New
CPI	Nadra Bagum	28,970	19.14	▼8.79
JMM	Chhedi Mahto	15,821	10.45	▼14.85
Independent	Shankar Chowdhury	13,931	9.20	New
BJP	Rakesh Prasad	13,493	8.91	▼34.48
Independent	Arjun Ram	7,975	5.27	New
CPI(ML)L	Devki Nandan Bediya	4,822	3.19	New
Margin of victory		22,279	14.72	▼0.75
Turnout		1,51,390	64.56	
Registered electors		2,34,487		
AJSU gain from BJP		Swing	▼9.54	

=== Assembly by-election 2001 ===
2001 Jharkhand Legislative Assembly by-election: Ramgarh
Party	Candidate	Votes	%	±%
BJP	Babulal Marandi	55,884	43.40	▲16.19
CPI	Nadra Begum	35,966	27.93	▼12.82
JMM	Arjun Ram	32,584	25.30	▼3.41
INC	Jamuna Prasad Sharma	3,576	2.78	New
Margin of victory		19,918	15.47	▲9.50
Turnout		1,28,774		
Registered electors		197086		
BJP gain from RJD		Swing	▼3.32	

=== Assembly election 2000 ===
2000 Bihar Legislative Assembly election: Ramgarh
Party	Candidate	Votes	%	±%
RJD	Jagdanand Singh	48,840	46.72	New
CPI	Sabir Ahmed Quaresi Alias Bhera Singh	42,599	40.75	New
JMM	Arjun Ram	30,013	28.71	New
BJP	Shankar Chowdhury	28,442	27.21	New
BSP	Malti Devi	24,299	23.24	New
SAP	Prabhawati Devi	20,919	20.01	New
RJD	Shahzada Anwar	7,427	7.10	New
Margin of victory		6,241	5.97	
Turnout		1,04,538	61.83	
Registered electors		1,70,872		
RJD win (new seat)				

== See also ==
- Vidhan Sabha
- List of states of India by type of legislature
