= Yadunath Baskey =

Indian politician and Tribal Leader (died 2022)

Yadunath Baskey (1926/1927 – 1 June 2022) was an Indian politician and a tribal leader. Baskey was a Tribal Welfare Minister in the Karpoori Thakur's Government of undivided Bihar in 1971, he represented Ghatshila constituency on a Jharkhand Party ticket as MLA in 1969. Baskey played a vital role in the fight for a separate Jharkhand state.

Baskey died on 1 June 2022 while undergoing treatment at Swarnarekha Nursing Home in Ghatshila, and cremated on Thursday with full state honors in Rangamatia village in Mediya Panchayat of Musabani block.
