= Ramdas Soren =

Indian politician (1963–2025)

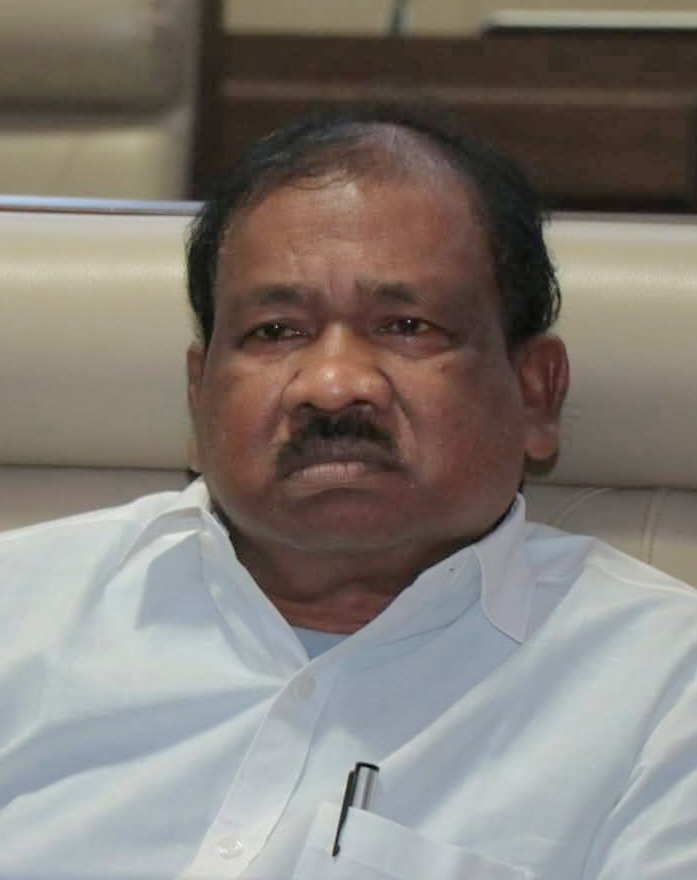

Cabinet Minister Government of Jharkhand
- In office 5 December 2024 – 15 August 2025
- Minister: Minister of School Education and Literacy
- Governor: Santosh Gangwar
- Chief Minister: Hemant Soren

Member of the Jharkhand Legislative Assembly
- In office 23 December 2019 – 15 August 2025
- Preceded by: Laxman Tudu
- Succeeded by: Somesh Chandra Soren
- Constituency: Ghatsila
- In office 2009–2014
- Preceded by: Pradeep Kumar Balmuchu
- Succeeded by: Laxman Tudu
- Constituency: Ghatsila

Cabinet Minister Government of Jharkhand
- In office 30 August 2024 – 28 November 2024
- Minister: Minister of Water Resources Department; Minister of Higher Education; Minister of Technical Education
- Governor: Santosh Gangwar
- Chief Minister: Hemant Soren

Personal details
- Born: Ramdas Soren; 1 January 1963 Jamshedpur, Bihar, India
- Died: 15 August 2025 (aged 62) New Delhi, India
- Party: Jharkhand Mukti Morcha
- Parent: Bahadur Soren (father)
- Education: Graduate (Co-operative College, Jamshedpur)
- Alma mater: Ranchi University
- Occupation: Social Service, Politician

Ramdas Soren (1 January 1963 – 15 August 2025) was an Indian politician. He was a member of Jharkhand Mukti Morcha. Soren was the cabinet minister for the Minister of School Education and Literacy in Government of Jharkhand. He was the member of Jharkhand Legislative Assembly from the Ghatshila Constituency. Soren died on 15 August 2025, at the age of 62.

== Positions held ==
From	To	Position
2009	2014	MLA in the 3rd Jharkhand Assembly from Ghatshila
2019	2025	MLA in the 5th Jharkhand Assembly from Ghatshila
2024	2025	Cabinet Minister -: Minister of Water Resources Department; Minister of Higher Education; Minister of Technical Education (30 August 2024–28 November 2024)
2024	2025	Cabinet Minister -: Minister of School Education and Literacy (5 December 2024 - 15 August 2025)

== Electoral history ==
=== Jharkhand Legislative Assembly elections ===
Year	Constituency	Party	Votes	%	Result
2005	Ghatsila	Independent	34,489	27.05	Lost
2009	Ghatsila	JMM	38,283	30.19	Won
2014	Ghatsila	JMM	46,103	28.52	Lost
2019	Ghatsila	JMM	63,531	37.36	Won
2024	Ghatsila	JMM	98,356	51.50	Won

== See also ==
- Jharkhand Legislative Assembly
- Jharkhand Mukti Morcha
- Third Hemant Soren ministry
- Hemant Soren
- Mithilesh Kumar Thakur
- Government of Jharkhand
