= Ram Narayan Singh =

Indian politician

Member of Parliament, Lok Sabha
- In office 1952–1957
- Succeeded by: Lalita Rajya Lakshmi
- Constituency: Hazaribagh, Bihar

Personal details
- Born: Ram Narayan Singh; 19 December 1884 Tetaria, Chatra district, Bihar, British India (Now Jharkhand, India)
- Died: 1964 (aged 79–80)
- Party: Chota Nagpur Santhal Parganas Janata Party
- Parent: Bholi Singh (father)
- Education: St.Xavier College, Kolkata

Ram Narayan Singh often referred to as Babu Ram Narayan Singh (1885–1964) was a noted freedom fighter, social worker and politician from Hazaribagh.

== Early life ==
He was born on 19 December 1884 in Tetaria village in Chatra district. His father's name was Bholi Singh. He completed his early school in Tetaria village and secondary education in Hazaribagh vernacular school. He completed his higher study in St.Xavier College Kolkata.

== Career ==
He and his brother Sukhlal Singh was among the early Congress workers from Chatra, who lead in Non-co-operation movement with other young congress leaders like Krishna Ballabh Sahay, Raj Ballabh Singh, Badri Singh of Koderma. They also propagated Khadi and mingled with Santhal leaders like Opan Manjhi, Bangma Manjhi for the social reform movement. He and Krishna Ballabh Sahay were firstly imprisoned for a month by British during 1920–21. The India's district gazetteers also makes a note that notable participants in the independence movement from Chhatra district include Babu Ram Narayan Singh, and Babu Shaligram Singh, who lead the Quit India movement and were imprisoned several times by British for their national activities. He was known as Chotanagpur Kesri - Lion of Chotanagpur. He was president of Hazaribagh district Congress Committee and worked closely with other national leaders like Rajendra Prasad, Jay Prakash Narayan, Anugrah Narayan Sinha and Shri Krishna Sinha was among the front leaders, during visit of Mahatma Gandhi's visit to Bihar in 1921-26 and in 1941-42

After independence, he disassociated himself from the Congress Party and won first Lok Sabha elections in 1951 from Hazaribagh West as a Chota Nagpur Santhal Parganas Janata Party candidate. It was Babu Ram Narayan Singh who first advocated for separate Jharkhand state in the parliament. He was very close to Shyama Prasad Mukherjee and was to accompany him with U. M. Trivedi and V. G. Deshpande on his eventful tour to Kashmir.

He was an active member of All India Kshatriya Mahasabha and was instrumental in reviving it in 1947 after independence and also served as association's president in 1955.

== See also ==
- Jharkhand movement
