= Bateshwar Singh =

Indian politician

Member of Parliament, Lok Sabha
- In office 1962–1967
- Preceded by: Quazi S. A. Matin
- Succeeded by: Imteyaz Ahmad
- Constituency: Giridih

Personal details
- Party: Swatantra Party

Bateshwar Singh was an Indian politician. He was a member of parliament, representing Giridih in the Lok Sabha the lower house of India's Parliament as a member of the Swatantra Party.
