= Surya Singh Besra =

Indian politician

Member of the Legislative Assembly, Bihar
- In office 1990–1991
- Preceded by: Karan Chandra Mardi
- Succeeded by: Pradeep Kumar Balmuchu
- Constituency: Ghatshila

Personal details
- Born: 1955 or 1956 (age 70–71) Barakanjia, Dumaria, Singhbhum district, Bihar (present-day East Singhbhum district, Jharkhand)
- Party: All Jharkhand Students Union; Jharkhand People's Party
- Education: M.A Santali
- Alma mater: Ranchi University
- Occupation: Political activist, politician
- Known for: founder of All Jharkhand Students Union; Jharkhand statehood movement

Surya Singh Besra is a political activist and prominent political leader. He is the founder secretary of All Jharkhand Students Union (AJSU) and Jharkhand People's Party (JPP). He was a member of the 10th Bihar Legislative Assembly, elected from the Ghatshila constituency in 1990. He is popularly known for Jharkhand statehood movement.

== Personal life ==
Surya Singh Besra (born 1955 or 1956) was born at Barakanjia, Dumaria, then in Singhbhum district of Bihar (now East Singhbhum district, Jharkhand), in a Santali ethnolinguistic Mahali family. His father was Sawna Besra, who worked as government employee. He attended Parulia Primary School near his village and Astokoshi High School, Bhalukpatra, completing matriculation under the Bihar School Examination Board. He graduated from Ghatsila College and obtained a Master of Arts in Santali from the Department of Tribal and Regional Languages, Ranchi University.

He is married to Kunti Besra, who was as a nurse by profession, and they have three children: Neetisha, Neelam, and Saurav.

== Political career ==
Electoral history of Besra
Election	House	Constituency	Party	Vote gained	%	Result	Ref
2024	Lok Sabha	Jhargram	JPP	19,494	1.31%	Lost	
2019	Lok Sabha	Jamshedpur	JPP	1,717	0.99%	Lost	
2004	Lok Sabha	Jamshedpur	NPF	11,057	1.42%	Lost	
2024	Jharkhand Legislative Assembly	Ghatsila	JPP	527	0.28%	Lost	
2019	Jharkhand Legislative Assembly	Ghatsila	JPP	2,255	1.33%	Lost	
2014	Jharkhand Legislative Assembly	Potka	JPP	12,177	6.55%	Lost	
2009	Jharkhand Legislative Assembly	Ghatsila	BJP	28,561	22.52%	Lost	
2005	Jharkhand Legislative Assembly	Potka	JPP	21,162	15.97%	Lost	
2000	Bihar Legislative Assembly	Potka	Ind	20,421	20.05%	Lost	
1995	Bihar Legislative Assembly	Ghatsila	JPP	7,914	6.72%	Lost	
1990	Bihar Legislative Assembly	Ghatsila	Ind	25,054	31.74%	Won	
1985	Bihar Legislative Assembly	Ghatsila	JMM	20,134	31.96%	Lost	
