= Gopal Sharan Nath Shahdeo =

Indian prince and politician

Member of Jharkhand Legislative Assembly Hatia
- In office 2009–2010
- Succeeded by: Navin Jaiswal
- In office 2005–2009
- Constituency: Hatia

Personal details
- Born: 2 April 1969 Ratu, Ranchi, Bihar(now Jharkhand)
- Died: 28 June 2010 (aged 41) Varanasi, Uttar Pradesh
- Party: Indian National Congress
- Spouse: Priyadarshini (m.1989)
- Parents: Maharaj Lal Chintamani Sharan Nath Shahdeo (father); Maharani Prem Manjari Devi (mother)
- Occupation: Politician
- As of 25 October, 2019

Gopal Sharan Nath Shahdeo (2 April 1969– 28 June 2010) was a prince of the Nagvanshi royal family. He was twice the state legislative assembly member from Hatia in 2005 and 2009 as Indian National Congress candidate.

== Family ==
He was the only son of Maharaj Lal Chintamani Sharan Nath Shahdeo and Maharani Prem Manjari Devi. He was married to Priyadarshini, the daughter of Mahendra Pratap Singh, the Raja of Shankargarh in 1989.

== Death ==
He died on 28 June 2010 due to heart attack in Varanasi.
