= Umashankar Muljibhai Trivedi =

Indian lawyer and politician

Member of Lok Sabha
- In office 1962–1967
- Succeeded by: Swatantra Singh Kothari
- Constituency: Mandsaur
- In office 1952–1957
- Succeeded by: Manikya Lal Verma
- Constituency: Chittor

Personal details
- Born: 9 July 1904
- Died: 1984 (aged 77-78)

Umashankar Muljibhai Trivedi (9 July 1904 – 1984) was a noted lawyer and politician of Bharatiya Jan Sangh.

Umashankar Muljibhai Trivedi was born in a Gujarati family on 9 July 1904 at Village Malvan in Sant State. He did his early education from Neemuch and graduated from Gujarat College, Ahmadabad. He did his lawyers degree from Lincoln's Inn. He was lawyer, barrister, translator and interpreter at High Court, Yangon. He was advocate at Supreme Court of India. He was a member of Indian National Congress till 1951, after which he was one of prominent Jan Sangh leaders. He was elected to 1st Lok Sabha from Chittor representing Jan Sangh in 1952 defeating strong opponent and former Chief Minister of Rajasthan, Manikya Lal Verma. He, Shyama Prasad Mukherjee and Durga Charan Banerjee were only three members belonging to Jan Sangh in 1st Lok Sabha. He was not a member of 2nd Lok Sabha but got elected to 3rd Lok Sabha from Mandsaur in Madhya Pradesh.

He was close associate of Shyama Prasad Mukherjee. He was with him on his fateful visit to Kashmir along with Babu Ram Narayan Singh, V. G. Deshpande others but was not allowed to join him further up. When Shyama Prasad was detained, he filed a moved a habeas corpus petition in the Kashmir High Court at Srinagar. The case was heard on 23 June 1953, judgement was to be delivered the next day but before that the news came that Mukherjee died in confinement.

He was active member Sarvadaliya Goraksha Maha-Abhiyan Samiti and was prominent face of demonstrations in 1966 anti-cow slaughter agitation along-with Atal Bihari Vajpayee.

He died in 1984.
