= Sunita Choudhary =

Indian politician

Member of the Jharkhand Legislative Assembly
- In office 10 March 2023 – 23 November 2024
- Preceded by: Mamta Devi
- Succeeded by: Mamta Devi
- Constituency: Ramgarh

Personal details
- Party: All Jharkhand Students Union
- Spouse: Chandra Prakash Choudhary
- Occupation: Politician

Sunita Choudhary is an Indian politician of All Jharkhand Students Union. She was elected as a MLA from Ramgarh constituency, Jharkhand Legislative Assembly. She defeated Congress party's candidate by 21,970 votes in the by poll held on 27 February 2023. She is the wife of Chandra Prakash Choudhary.
