= Tika Ram Majhi =

Indian politician

Tika Ram Majhi (died 30 August 2004) was an Indian politician and leader of Communist Party of India. He represented Ghatsila constituency from 1972 to 1985. He was the state vice president of AITUC. He was a senior advocate of the Jamshedpur civil court, and was also the former president of a Jamshedpur Bar Association.
