= Ramdas Singh =

Indian politician

Member of Parliament, Lok Sabha
- In office 1989–1991
- Preceded by: Sarfaraz Ahmad
- Succeeded by: Binod Bihari Mahato
- In office 1977–1980
- Preceded by: Chapalendu Bhattacharyyia
- Succeeded by: Bindeshwari Dubey
- Constituency: Giridih

Personal details
- Died: 30 August 2005
- Party: Bharatiya Janata Party
- Other political affiliations: Janata Party
- Spouse: Deo Kali
- Children: 4

Ramdas Singh is an Indian politician. He was a Member of Parliament, representing Giridih in the Lok Sabha the lower house of India's Parliament as a member of the Bharatiya Janata Party.
