= 1977 Bihar Legislative Assembly election =

Election in India

1977 Bihar legislative assembly election
- 6 October 1977

All 324 seats in the Bihar Legislative Assembly 163 seats needed for a majority
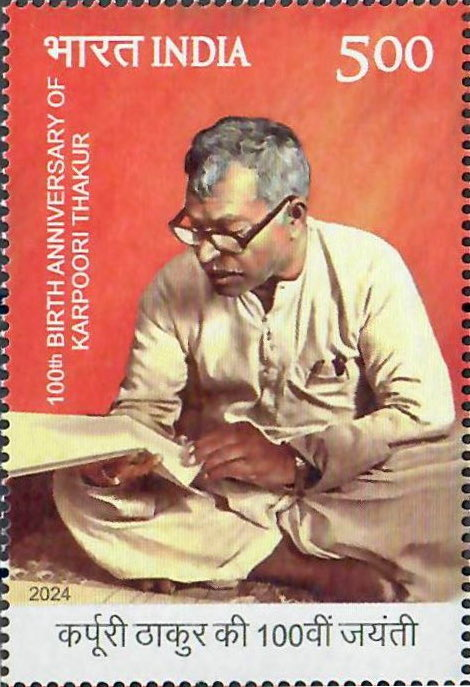

| | Majority party | Minority party | Third party |
|---|---|---|---|
| | | | CPI |
| Leader | Karpoori Thakur | Jagannath Mishra |
| Party | JP | INC | CPI |
| Leader since | 1977 | 1975 |
| Seats before | New | 167 | 35 |
| Seats after | 214 | 57 | 21 |
| Seat change | New | ▼110 | ▼14 |
CM before election
President's rule
N/A
Elected CM
Karpoori Thakur
JP

1977 Bihar Legislative Assembly election was held in 1977 to elect members to the Bihar Legislative Assembly in the state of Bihar, India. The Janata Party's decisive victories in the state and political elections ensured Chief Minister Karpoori Thakur's victory. Thakur became Chief Minister of Bihar for the second time by winning the legislative party election against Bihar Janata Party President Satyendra Narayan Sinha, formerly of Congress [O], by a vote of 144 to 84. It was pre-decided that Lok Dal Faction of Janata Party would get CM post in Bihar, UP and haryana, while MP, Rajasthan and Himachal went to Jan Sangh faction.

== Results ==
| Party | Seats Contested | Seats Won | Seats Change | Vote Share |
|---|---|---|---|---|
| Janata Party | 311 | 214 | ▲214 | 42.7% |
| Indian National Congress | 286 | 57 | ▼110 | 23.6% |
| Independent politician | 2206 | 24 | ▲7 | 23.7% |
| Communist Party of India | 73 | 21 | ▼14 | 7.0% |
| Communist Party of India | 16 | 4 | ▼14 | 0.9% |
| Jharkhand Party | 31 | 2 | ▲1 | 0.4% |
| Akhil Bharatiya Shoshit Samaj Dal | 26 | 1 | New | 0.8% |
| All India Jharkhand Party | 21 | 1 | New | 0.5% |

== Elected members ==
| # | Constituency | Reserved for (SC/ST/None) | Member | Party |
|---|---|---|---|---|
| 1 | Dhanaha | None | Har Deo Prasad | Indian National Congress |
| 2 | Bagha | SC | Narsingh Baitha | Indian National Congress |
| 3 | Ramnagar | None | Arjun Bikram Shah | Indian National Congress |
| 4 | Shikarpur | SC | Sitaram Prasad | Indian National Congress |
| 5 | Sikta | None | Faiyazul Azam | Indian National Congress |
| 6 | Lauria | None | Vishwa Mohan Sharma | Indian National Congress |
| 7 | Chunpatia | None | Vir Singh | Janata Party |
| 8 | Bettiah | None | Gauri Shankar Pandey | Indian National Congress |
| 9 | Nautan | None | Kedar Pandey | Indian National Congress |
| 10 | Raxaul | None | Sagir Ahmad | Indian National Congress |
| 11 | Sugauli | None | Ramashray Singh | Communist Party of India |
| 12 | Motihari | None | Prabhawati Gupta | Indian National Congress |
| 13 | Adapur | None | Ram Prit Rai | Indian National Congress |
| 14 | Dhaka | None | Siyaram Thakur | Janata Party |
| 15 | Ghorasahan | None | Rajendra Pratap Singh | Indian National Congress |
| 16 | Madhuban | None | Rup Lal Rai | Indian National Congress |
| 17 | Pipra | SC | Tulsi Ram | Communist Party of India |
| 18 | Kesariya | None | Pitambar Singh | Communist Party of India |
| 19 | Harsidhi | None | Yagul Kishore Prasad Singh | Janata Party |
| 20 | Gobindganj | None | Ramashankar Pandey | Indian National Congress |
| 21 | Kateya | None | Nagina Rai | Indian National Congress |
| 22 | Bhore | SC | Jamuna Ram | Janata Party |
| 23 | Mirganj | None | Bhavesh Chandra Prasad | Janata Party |
| 24 | Gopalganj | None | Radhika Devi | Janata Party |
| 25 | Barauli | None | Ahdul Ghafoor | Indian National Congress |
| 26 | Baikunthpur | None | Braj Kishore Narain Singh | Janata Party |
| 27 | Basantpur | None | Vidya Bhaushan Singh | Janata Party |
| 28 | Goreakothi | None | Krishna Kant Singh | Indian National Congress |
| 29 | Siwan | None | Ghulam Sarwar | Janata Party |
| 30 | Mairwa | SC | Phulchand Ram | Janata Party |
| 31 | Darauli | None | Krishna Pratap Singh | Indian National Congress |
| 32 | Ziradei | None | Raja Ram Choudhary | Indian National Congress |
| 33 | Maharajganj | None | Uma Shankar Singh | Janata Party |
| 34 | Raghunathpur | None | Bikram Kaur | Janata Party |
| 35 | Manjhi | None | Ram Bahadur Singh | Janata Party |
| 36 | Baniapur | None | Rama Kant Pandey | Janata Party |
| 37 | Masrakh | None | Krishnadeo Narain Singh | Janata Party |
| 38 | Taraiya | None | Dharam Nath Singh | Janata Party |
| 39 | Marhaura | None | Surya Singh | Janata Party |
| 40 | Jalalpur | None | Cameshwar Singh | Janata Party |
| 41 | Chapra | None | Mithlesh Kumar Singh | Janata Party |
| 42 | Garkha | SC | Muneshwar Choudhary | Janata Party |
| 43 | Parsa | None | Ramanand Prasad Yadav | Janata Party |
| 44 | Sonepur | None | Ram Sunder Das | Janata Party |
| 45 | Hajipur | None | Jagannath Prasad Yadav | Janata Party |
| 46 | Raghopur | None | Vabulal Shastri | Janata Party |
| 47 | Mahnar | None | Muneshwar Prasad Singh | Janata Party |
| 48 | Jandaha | None | Munshi Lal Ray | Janata Party |
| 49 | Patepur | SC | Paltan Ram | Janata Party |
| 50 | Mahua | SC | Phudeni Prasad | Janata Party |
| 51 | Lalganj | None | Arun Kumar Sinha | Janata Party |
| 52 | Vaishali | None | Nagendra Pd. Singh | Janata Party |
| 53 | Paru | None | Shyam Kumar Pd. Singh | Janata Party |
| 54 | Sahebganj | None | Bhagya Naraian Rai | Communist Party of India |
| 55 | Baruraj | None | Balendra Prasad Singh | Communist Party of India |
| 56 | Kanti | None | Thakur Pd. Singh | Janata Party |
| 57 | Kurhani | None | Sabhu Saran Shahi | Janata Party |
| 58 | Sakra | SC | Shivanandan Paswan | Janata Party |
| 59 | Muzaffarpur | None | Manjay Lal | Janata Party |
| 60 | Bochaha | SC | Kamal Paswan | Janata Party |
| 61 | Gaighatti | None | Vinodanand Singh | Janata Party |
| 62 | Aurai | None | Ganesh Prasad Yadav | Janata Party |
| 63 | Minapur | None | Nagendra Pd. Singh | Janata Party |
| 64 | Runisaidpur | None | Nawal Kishore Sahi | Janata Party |
| 65 | Belsand | None | Raghubansh Prasad Singh | Janata Party |
| 66 | Sheohar | None | Raghunath Jha | Indian National Congress |
| 67 | Sitamarhi | None | Ram Sagar Prasad Yadav | Indian National Congress |
| 68 | Bathnaha | None | Suryadeo Rai | Indian National Congress |
| 69 | Majorganj | SC | Surendra Ram | Janata Party |
| 70 | Sonbarsa | None | Mahmud Alam | Indian National Congress |
| 71 | Sursand | None | Ram Charitra Rai Yadav | Indian National Congress |
| 72 | Pupri | None | Habib Ahmad | Janata Party |
| 73 | Benipatti | None | Tej Narayan Jha | Communist Party of India |
| 74 | Bisfi | None | Raj Kumar Purbey | Communist Party of India |
| 75 | Harlakhi | None | Baidya Nath Yadav | Communist Party of India |
| 76 | Khajauli | SC | Ram Karan Paswan | Janata Party |
| 77 | Babubarhi | None | Deo Narayan Yadav | Janata Party |
| 78 | Madhubani | None | Digambar Thakur | Janata Party |
| 79 | Pandaul | None | Siya Ram Yadav | Janata Party |
| 80 | Jhanjharpur | None | Jagannath Mishra | Indian National Congress |
| 81 | Phulparas | None | Devendra Prasad Yadav | Janata Party |
| 82 | Laukaha | None | Kuldeo Goit | Indian National Congress |
| 83 | Madhepur | None | Radhanandan Jha | Indian National Congress |
| 84 | Manigachhi | None | Nagendra Jha | Indian National Congress |
| 85 | Bahera | None | Abdul Bari Siddiqui | Janata Party |
| 86 | Ghanshyampur | None | Mahavir Prasad | Janata Party |
| 87 | Baheri | None | Taj Narayan Yadav | Janata Party |
| 88 | Darbhanga Rural | SC | Jagadish Choudhary (kabirchak) | Janata Party |
| 89 | Darbhanga | None | Shivnath Verma | Janata Party |
| 90 | Keoti | None | Durga Das Rathaur | Janata Party |
| 91 | Jale | None | Kapildeo Thakur | Janata Party |
| 92 | Hayaghat | None | Anirudh Prasad | Janata Party |
| 93 | Kalyanpur | None | Bashishtha Narayan Singh | Janata Party |
| 94 | Warisnagar | SC | Pitamwar Paswan | Janata Party |
| 95 | Samastipur | None | Chandra Shekhar Singh | Janata Party |
| 96 | Sarairanjan | None | Yashoda Nand Singh | Janata Party |
| 97 | Mohiuddin Nagar | None | Premlata Rai | Janata Party |
| 98 | Dalsinghsarai | None | Yashwant Kumar Choudhary | Janata Party |
| 99 | Bibhutpur | None | Bandhu Mahto | Indian National Congress |
| 100 | Rosera | None | Prayag Mandal | Independent |
| 101 | Singhia | SC | Ramjatan Paswan | Communist Party of India |
| 102 | Hasanpur | None | Gajendra Prasad Himansu | Janata Party |
| 103 | Balia | None | Chand Chur Dev | Janata Party |
| 104 | Maithani | None | Sitaram Mishra | Communist Party of India |
| 105 | Begusarai | None | Bhola Singh | Indian National Congress |
| 106 | Barauni | None | Suryanarayan Singh | Communist Party of India |
| 107 | Bachwara | None | Ramdeo Rai | Indian National Congress |
| 108 | Cheria Bariarpur | None | Harihar Mahton | Indian National Congress |
| 109 | Bakhri | SC | Ram Chandra Paswan | Communist Party of India |
| 110 | Raghopur | None | Asesar Goit | Janata Party |
| 111 | Kishunpur | None | Baidhya Nath Mehta | Janata Party |
| 112 | Supaul | None | Amrendra Prasad Singh | Janata Party |
| 113 | Tribeniganj | None | Anup Lal Yadav | Janata Party |
| 114 | Chhatapur | SC | Sitaram Paswan | Janata Party |
| 115 | Kumarkhand | SC | Nawal Kishore Rishideo | Janata Party |
| 116 | Singheshwar | None | Dinbandhu Prasad Yadav | Janata Party |
| 117 | Saharsa | None | Shankar Pd Tekriwal | Janata Party |
| 118 | Mahishi | None | Parmeshwar Kumar | Janata Party |
| 119 | Simri-Bakhtiarpur | None | Choudhary Mohammad Salahuddin | Indian National Congress |
| 120 | Madhepura | None | Radha Kant Yadav | Janata Party |
| 121 | Sonbarsa | None | Ashok Kumar Singh | Janata Party |
| 122 | Kishanganj | None | Raj Nandan Prasad | Janata Party |
| 123 | Alamnagar | None | Birendra Kumar Singh | Janata Party |
| 124 | Rupauli | None | Shaligram Singh Tomar | Janata Party |
| 125 | Dhamdaha | None | Surya Narayan Singh Yadav | Janata Party |
| 126 | Banmankhi | SC | Balbodh Paswan | Janata Party |
| 127 | Raniganj | SC | Adhik Lal Paswan | Janata Party |
| 128 | Narpatganj | None | Janardan Yadav | Janata Party |
| 129 | Forbesganj | None | Saryu Mishra | Indian National Congress |
| 130 | Araria | None | Srideo Jha | Indian National Congress |
| 131 | Sikti | None | Md. Azim Uddin | Independent |
| 132 | Jokihat | None | Taslimuddin | Janata Party |
| 133 | Bahadurganj | None | Islamuddin Bagi | Janata Party |
| 134 | Thakurganj | None | Mohamad Sulemam | Janata Party |
| 135 | Kishanganj | None | Rafiqui Alam | Indian National Congress |
| 136 | Amour | None | Chandra Shekhar Jha | Janata Party |
| 137 | Baisi | None | Hasibur Rahman | Indian National Congress |
| 138 | Kasba | None | Jai Narayan Mehta | Indian National Congress |
| 139 | Purnea | None | Dev Nath Roy | Janata Party |
| 140 | Korha | SC | Sita Ram Das | Janata Party |
| 141 | Barari | None | Basudeo Prasad Singh | Janata Party |
| 142 | Katihar | None | Jagbandhu Adhikari | Janata Party |
| 143 | Kadwa | None | Khaja Sahid Hussain | Independent |
| 144 | Barsoi | None | Abu Nayeem Chand | Independent |
| 145 | Pranpur | None | Mahendra Narain Yadav | Janata Party |
| 146 | Manihari | None | Ram Siphai Yadav | Janata Party |
| 147 | Rajmahal | None | Dhruv Bhagat | Independent |
| 148 | Borio | ST | Benjamin Murmu | Janata Party |
| 149 | Barhait | ST | Parmeshwar Humbrom | Janata Party |
| 150 | Litipara | ST | Simon Marandi | Independent |
| 151 | Pakaur | None | Haji Md. Ainul Haque | Indian National Congress |
| 152 | Maheshpur | ST | Bishawnath Murmu | Janata Party |
| 153 | Sikaripara | ST | Babulal Kisku | Janata Party |
| 154 | Nala | None | Bisheswar Khan | Communist Party of India |
| 155 | Jamtara | None | Durga Prasad Singh | Indian National Congress |
| 156 | Sarath | None | Chandra Mouleshwar Singh | Janata Party |
| 157 | Madhupur | None | Ajit Kumar Baneerjee | Janata Party |
| 158 | Deoghar | SC | Veena Rani | Janata Party |
| 159 | Jarmundi | None | Dip Nath Rai | Independent |
| 160 | Dumka | ST | Mahadeo Marandi | Janata Party |
| 161 | Jama | ST | Madan Besra | Indian National Congress |
| 162 | Poreyahat | None | Kamla Kant Pd. Sinha Urf Lallu | Janata Party |
| 163 | Godda | None | Lakhan Mahto | Janata Party |
| 164 | Mahagama | None | Sayeed | Janata Party |
| 165 | Pirpainti | None | Ambika Prasad | Communist Party of India |
| 166 | Colgong | None | Sadanand Singh | Indian National Congress |
| 167 | Nathnagar | None | Sudha Srivastava | Janata Party |
| 168 | Bhagalpur | None | Bijoy Kumar Mitra | Janata Party |
| 169 | Gopalpur | None | Mani Ram Singh | Communist Party of India |
| 170 | Bihpur | None | Sitaram Singh Azad | Communist Party of India |
| 171 | Sultanganj | None | Jageshwar Mandal | Janata Party |
| 172 | Amarpur | None | Janardhan Yadav | Janata Party |
| 173 | Dhuraiya | SC | Naresh Das | Communist Party of India |
| 174 | Banka | None | Sindheshwar Prasad Singh | Janata Party |
| 175 | Belhar | None | Chaturbhuj Prasad Singh | Janata Party |
| 176 | Katoria | None | Guneshwar Prasad Singh | Janata Party |
| 177 | Chakai | None | Phalguni Prasad Yadav | Independent |
| 178 | Jhajha | None | Sheonandan Jha | Janata Party |
| 179 | Tarapur | None | Kaushalaya Devi | Janata Party |
| 180 | Kharagpur | None | Shamesher Jang Bahadur Singh | Janata Party |
| 181 | Parbatta | None | Nayeem Akhtar | Independent |
| 182 | Chautham | None | Jagdambi Mandal | Independent |
| 183 | Khagaria | None | Ram Sharan Yadav | Independent |
| 184 | Alauli | SC | Pashupati Kumar Paras | Janata Party |
| 185 | Monghyr | None | Syed Jabir Hussain | Janata Party |
| 186 | Jamalpur | None | Suresh Kumar Singh | Janata Party |
| 187 | Surajgarha | None | Ramjee Prasad Mahta | Independent |
| 188 | Jamui | None | Tripurari Prasad Singh | Janata Party |
| 189 | Sikandra | SC | Nagina Chaudhary | Janata Party |
| 190 | Lakhisarai | None | Kapildeo Singh | Janata Party |
| 191 | Sheikhpura | None | Rajo Singh | Indian National Congress |
| 192 | Barbigha | SC | Nain Tara Dass | Janata Party |
| 193 | Asthawan | None | Indradeo Chaudhary | Independent |
| 194 | Bihar | None | Devnath Prasad | Communist Party of India |
| 195 | Rajgir | SC | Satyadeo Narain Arya | Janata Party |
| 196 | Nalanda | None | Shyam Sundar Prasad | Indian National Congress |
| 197 | Islampur | None | Krishna Vallabh Prasad Singh | Communist Party of India |
| 198 | Hilsa | None | Jagdish Prasad | Janata Party |
| 199 | Chandi | None | Hari Narain Singh | Janata Party |
| 200 | Harnaut | None | Bhola Prasad Singh | Independent |
| 201 | Mokameh | None | Krishna Shahi | Indian National Congress |
| 202 | Barh | None | Ranasheolakhapati Singh | Janata Party |
| 203 | Bakhtiarpur | None | Budhdeo Singh | Indian National Congress |
| 204 | Fatwa | SC | Kameshwar Paswan | Janata Party |
| 205 | Massaurhi | None | Ramdeo Prasad Yadav | Janata Party |
| 206 | Patna West | None | Thakur Prasad | Janata Party |
| 207 | Patna Central | None | Mohammad Shahabuddin | Janata Party |
| 208 | Patna East | None | Ramdeo Mahto | Janata Party |
| 209 | Dinapur | None | Ram Lakhan Singh Yadav | Indian National Congress |
| 210 | Maner | None | Suryadeo Singh | Janata Party |
| 211 | Phulwari | SC | Ram Prit Paswan | Janata Party |
| 212 | Bikram | None | Kailashpati Mishra | Janata Party |
| 213 | Paliganj | None | Kanhai Singh | Independent |
| 214 | Sandesh | None | Ram Dayal Singh | Janata Party |
| 215 | Barhara | None | Ambika Saran Singh | Janata Party |
| 216 | Arrah | None | Sumitra Devi | Janata Party |
| 217 | Shahpur | None | Jai Narain Mishra | Janata Party |
| 218 | Brahmpur | None | Ramakant Thakur | Janata Party |
| 219 | Buxar | None | Jagnarain Trivedi | Indian National Congress |
| 220 | Rajpur | SC | Nand Kishore Prasad | Janata Party |
| 221 | Dumraon | None | Ramashray Singh | Communist Party of India |
| 222 | Jagdishpur | None | Satya Narain Singh | Independent |
| 223 | Piro | None | Raghupati Gop | Janata Party |
| 224 | Sahar | SC | Dineshwar Prasad | Janata Party |
| 225 | Karakat | None | Tribhuwan Singh | Janata Party |
| 226 | Bikramganj | None | Ekhlak Ahmad | Janata Party |
| 227 | Dinara | None | Sheopujan Singh | Janata Party |
| 228 | Ramgarh | None | Sachidanand Singh | Janata Party |
| 229 | Mohania | SC | Ram Krishna Ram | Janata Party |
| 230 | Bhabhua | None | Shib Pariksha Singh | Janata Party |
| 231 | Chainpur | None | Lalmuni Chaubey | Janata Party |
| 232 | Sasaram | None | Bipin Bihari Sinha | Janata Party |
| 233 | Chenari | SC | Ram Bachan Paswan | Janata Party |
| 234 | Nokha | None | Gopal Narain Singh | Janata Party |
| 235 | Dehri | None | Basawan Singh | Janata Party |
| 236 | Nabinagar | None | Yugal Singh | Janata Party |
| 237 | Deo | SC | Ram Lagan Ram | Janata Party |
| 238 | Aurangabad | None | Ram Naresh Singh | Indian National Congress |
| 239 | Rafiganj | None | Md. Hussain Ansari | Janata Party |
| 240 | Obra | None | Ram Vilas Singh | Janata Party |
| 241 | Goh | None | Ram Saran Yadav | Communist Party of India |
| 242 | Arwal | None | Baneshwar Prasad Singh | Janata Party |
| 243 | Kurtha | None | Nagnani | Shoshit Samaj Dal |
| 244 | Makhdumpur | None | Ram Jatan Sinha | Janata Party |
| 245 | Jahanabad | None | Ram Chandra Yadav | Janata Party |
| 246 | Ghoshi | None | Jagdish Sharma | Janata Party |
| 247 | Balaganj | None | Shambhu Prasad Singh | Janata Party |
| 248 | Konch | None | Naresh Prasad Singh | Janata Party |
| 249 | Gaya Muffasil | None | Vijay Kumar Singh | Janata Party |
| 250 | Gaya Town | None | Sushila Sahay | Janata Party |
| 251 | Imamganj | SC | Ishwar Das | Janata Party |
| 252 | Gurua | None | Upendra Nath Verma | Janata Party |
| 253 | Bodh Gaya | SC | Rajesh Kumar | Janata Party |
| 254 | Barachatti | SC | Bhagwati Devi | Janata Party |
| 255 | Fatehpur | SC | Mohan Ram | Janata Party |
| 256 | Atri | None | Mundrika Singh | Janata Party |
| 257 | Nawada | None | Ganesh Shanker Vidyarthi | Communist Party of India |
| 258 | Rajauli | SC | Babu Lal | Independent |
| 259 | Gobindpur | None | Bhatu Mahto | Janata Party |
| 260 | Warsaliganj | None | Ram Ratan Singh | Janata Party |
| 261 | Hisua | None | Babu Lal Singh | Janata Party |
| 262 | Kodarma | None | Vishwanath Modi | Janata Party |
| 263 | Barhi | None | Lalita Rajya Lakshmi | Janata Party |
| 264 | Chatra | None | S. Ahmad Sabr | Janata Party |
| 265 | Simaria | SC | Upendra Nath Das | Janata Party |
| 266 | Barkagaon | None | Kailash Pati Singh | Janata Party |
| 267 | Ramgarh | None | Bishwanath Choudhary | Janata Party |
| 268 | Mandu | None | Gopal Sharan Singh | Janata Party |
| 269 | Hazaribagh | None | Rani De | Janata Party |
| 270 | Barkatha | None | Sukhdeo Yadav | Janata Party |
| 271 | Dhanwar | None | Harihar Narayan Prabhkar | Janata Party |
| 272 | Bagodar | None | Gautam Sagar Rana | Janata Party |
| 273 | Jamua | SC | Shukar Rawidas | Janata Party |
| 274 | Gandey | None | Laxman Swarnkar | Janata Party |
| 275 | Giridih | None | Chaturanan Mishra | Communist Party of India |
| 276 | Dumri | None | Lalchand Mahto | Janata Party |
| 277 | Gomia | None | Chharru Ram Mahto | Janata Party |
| 278 | Bermo | None | Mithilesh Kumar | Janata Party |
| 279 | Bokaro | None | Samresh Singh | Independent |
| 280 | Tundi | None | Satya Narain Dudani | Janata Party |
| 281 | Baghmara | None | Shankar Dayal Singh | Indian National Congress |
| 282 | Sindri | None | Anand Mahto | Independent |
| 283 | Nirsa | None | Kripa Shanker Chatterjee | Independent |
| 284 | Dhanbad | None | Yogeshwar Prasad 'yogesh' | Indian National Congress |
| 285 | Jharia | None | Surya Deo Singh | Janata Party |
| 286 | Chandankiyari | SC | Ram Das Ram | Indian National Congress |
| 287 | Baharagora | None | Bishna Pada Ghosh | Indian National Congress |
| 288 | Ghatsila | ST | Tika Ram Majhi | Communist Party of India |
| 289 | Potka | ST | Sanatan Sardar | Janata Party |
| 290 | Jugsulai | SC | Kartik Kumar | Janata Party |
| 291 | Jamshedpur East | None | Dina Nath Pandey | Janata Party |
| 292 | Jamshedpur West | None | Mohd. Ayub Khan | Janata Party |
| 293 | Ichagarh | None | Ghansyam Mahto | Independent |
| 294 | Seraikella | ST | Kade Majhi | Janata Party |
| 295 | Chaibasa | ST | Muktidani Sumbrui | All India Jharkhand Party |
| 296 | Majhgaon | ST | Gowardhan Nayak | Janata Party |
| 297 | Jaganathpur | ST | Barju Hansda | Janata Party |
| 298 | Manoharpur | ST | Ratnakar Nayak | Independent |
| 299 | Chakradharpur | ST | Jaganath Bakira | Janata Party |
| 300 | Kharasawan | ST | Debi Lal Mati Soy | Janata Party |
| 301 | Tamar | ST | Anirudh Patar | Janata Party |
| 302 | Torpa | ST | Niral Enam Horo | Jan Kranti Dal |
| 303 | Khunti | ST | Khudia Pahan | Janata Party |
| 304 | Silli | None | Rajendra Singh | Communist Party of India |
| 305 | Khijri | ST | Sukhari Oraon | Janata Party |
| 306 | Ranchi | None | Nani Gopal Mitra | Janata Party |
| 307 | Hatia | None | Subodh Kant Sahay | Janata Party |
| 308 | Kanke | SC | Hira Ram Toofani | Janata Party |
| 309 | Mandar | ST | Karam Chand Bhagat | Indian National Congress |
| 310 | Sisai | ST | Lalit Oraon | Janata Party |
| 311 | Kolebira | ST | Birsing Munda | Jan Kranti Dal |
| 312 | Simdega | ST | Nirmal Kumar Besra | Janata Party |
| 313 | Gumla | ST | Jayram Oraon | Independent |
| 314 | Bishunpur | ST | Kartik Oraon | Indian National Congress |
| 315 | Lohardaga | ST | Indranath Bhagat | Indian National Congress |
| 316 | Latchar | SC | Ramdeo | Janata Party |
| 317 | Manika | ST | Yamuna Singh | Janata Party |
| 318 | Panki | None | Mohan Singh | Janata Party |
| 319 | Daltonganj | None | Puran Chand | Janata Party |
| 320 | Garhwa | None | Vinod N Dixit | Janata Party |
| 321 | Bhawanathpur | None | Ram Chandra Prasad Keshri | Janata Party |
| 322 | Bishrampur | None | Vinod Singh | Independent |
| 323 | Chhatarpur | SC | Jorawar Ram | Janata Party |
| 324 | Hussainabad | None | Harihar Singh | Indian National Congress |
