= Mamta Devi =

Indian politician

Member of the Jharkhand Legislative Assembly
- Incumbent
- Assumed office 23 November 2024
- Preceded by: Sunita Choudhary
- Constituency: Ramgarh
- In office 23 December 2019 – 14 December 2022
- Preceded by: Chandra Prakash Choudhary
- Succeeded by: Sunita Choudhary
- Constituency: Ramgarh

Member of Ramgarh Zilla Parishad
- In office 2015–2019
- Constituency: Gola, Ramgarh

Personal details
- Born: 12 January 1984 (age 42) India
- Party: Indian National Congress
- Spouse: Bajrang Mahto
- Occupation: Social Worker, Politician
- Website: twitter.com/MLARamgarh

Mamta Devi is an Indian politician from Jharkhand and a member of the Indian National Congress. She was a member of the Jharkhand Legislative Assembly from Ramgarh. She has been also a member of Zila Parishad, Ramgarh.

== Conviction ==
In 2022, she was convicted of attempt to murder along with 12 others by a sessions court and sentenced to five-years in prison.
