= Somesh Chandra Soren =

Indian politician

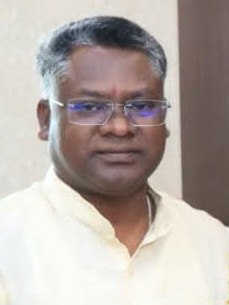

Member of the Jharkhand Legislative Assembly
- Incumbent
- Assumed office 14 November 2025
- Preceded by: Ramdas Soren
- Constituency: Ghatsila

Personal details
- Party: Jharkhand Mukti Morcha
- Parent: Ramdas Soren (father)
- Occupation: Politician

Somesh Chandra Soren is an Indian politician and the current MLA from Ghatsila Assembly constituency in Jharkhand. He is the son of Ramdas Soren, former Cabinet Minister in the Government of Jharkhand. He belongs to the Jharkhand Mukti Morcha party.

== Electoral history ==
=== Jharkhand Legislative Assembly elections ===
Year	Constituency	Party	Votes	%	Result
2025^	Ghatsila	JMM	104,794	54.78	Won

^by-election
