= Hatia Assembly constituency =

Constituency of the Jharkhand legislative assembly in India

Coordinates: 25.78°N 73.33°E

Hatia
- Constituency No. 64 for the Jharkhand Legislative Assembly

Constituency details
- Country: India
- Region: East India
- State: Jharkhand
- District: Ranchi
- Lok Sabha constituency: Ranchi
- Established: 2000
- Total electors: 448,166
- Reservation: None

Member of Legislative Assembly
- 6th Jharkhand Legislative Assembly
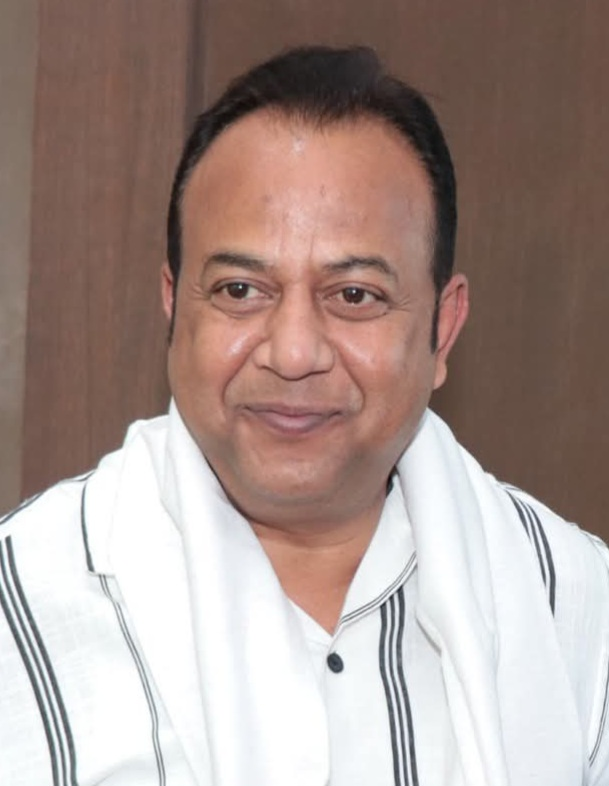
- Incumbent Navin Jaiswal
- Party: BJP
- Elected year: 2024

Hatia is an assembly constituency in the Indian state of Jharkhand.

Most successful parties after separate Jharkhand state.
1. INC (33.3%)
2. BJP (33.3%)
3. AJSU (16.7%)
4. JVM (16.7%)

== Members of the Legislative Assembly ==
Election	Member	Party
Bihar Legislative Assembly
Before 1977: Constituency did not exist
1977	Subodh Kant Sahay	Janata Party
1980	Subodh Kant Sahay	Janata Party
1985	Subodh Kant Sahay	Janata Party
1990	Ramji Lal Sarda	Bharatiya Janata Party
1995	Ramji Lal Sarda	Bharatiya Janata Party
2000	Ramji Lal Sarda	Bharatiya Janata Party
Jharkhand Legislative Assembly
2005	Gopal Sharan Nath Shahdeo	Indian National Congress
2009	Gopal Sharan Nath Shahdeo	Indian National Congress
2012^	Navin Jaiswal	All Jharkhand Students Union
2014	Navin Jaiswal	Jharkhand Vikas Morcha
2019	Navin Jaiswal	Bharatiya Janata Party
2024	Navin Jaiswal	Bharatiya Janata Party

^by-election

== Election results ==
=== Assembly election 2024 ===
2024 Jharkhand Legislative Assembly election: Hatia
Party	Candidate	Votes	%	±%
BJP	Navin Jaiswal	152,949	49.16%	▲3.32
INC	Ajay Nath Shahdeo	1,38,326	44.46%	▲5.08
Independent	Bharat Kanshi	6,668	2.14%	New
NOTA	None of the Above	1,358	0.44%	▼0.16
Margin of victory		14,623	4.70%	▼1.76
Turnout		3,11,120	59.13%	▲2.94
Registered electors		5,26,189		▲17.41
BJP hold		Swing	▲3.32	

=== Assembly election 2019 ===
2019 Jharkhand Legislative Assembly election: Hatia
Party	Candidate	Votes	%	±%
BJP	Navin Jaiswal	115,431	45.84%	▲9.08
INC	Ajay Nath Shahdeo	99,167	39.38%	▲36.32
CPI(M)	Subhash Munda	14,215	5.65%	▲2.27
AJSU	Bharat Kanshi	9,357	3.72%	New
JVM(P)	Shobha Yadav	3,470	1.38%	▼39.06
Independent	Arun Tiwari	1,341	0.53%	New
NOTA	None of the Above	1,507	0.60%	▲0.07
Margin of victory		16,264	6.46%	▲2.78
Turnout		2,51,815	56.19%	▼1.10
Registered electors		4,48,166		▲17.67
BJP gain from JVM(P)		Swing	▲5.40	

=== Assembly election 2014 ===
2014 Jharkhand Legislative Assembly election: Hatia
Party	Candidate	Votes	%	±%
JVM(P)	Navin Jaiswal	88,228	40.44%	▲20.99
BJP	Seema Sharma	80,210	36.76%	▲19.62
JMM	Dr. Jawed Ahmed	22,561	10.34%	New
CPI(M)	Subhash Munda	7,365	3.38%	New
INC	Alok Kumar Dubey	6,685	3.06%	▼11.08
CPI(M)	Vikas Chandra Sharma	1,765	0.81%	New
Independent	Azam Ahmad	1,219	0.56%	New
NOTA	None of the Above	1,145	0.52%	New
Margin of victory		8,018	3.67%	▼4.11
Turnout		2,18,184	57.28%	▲19.38
Registered electors		3,80,876		▼5.39
JVM(P) gain from AJSU		Swing	▲13.20	

=== Assembly by-election 2012 ===
2012 Jharkhand Legislative Assembly by-election: Hatia
Party	Candidate	Votes	%	±%
AJSU	Navin Jaiswal	41,566	27.24%	▲12.03
JVM(P)	A. N. Shahdeo	29,682	19.45%	New
BJP	R. Ji Lal Sharda	26,151	17.14%	▼9.43
INC	S. K. Sahay	21,578	14.14%	▼12.44
Margin of victory		11,884	7.79%	▲7.77
Turnout		1,52,590	37.90%	▼1.52
Registered electors		4,02,578		▲5.70
AJSU gain from INC		Swing	▲0.66	

=== Assembly election 2009 ===
2009 Jharkhand Legislative Assembly election: Hatia
Party	Candidate	Votes	%	±%
INC	Gopal Sharan Nath Shahdeo	39,921	26.58%	▼15.93
BJP	Ramji Lal Sharda	39,896	26.57%	▼17.19
AJSU	Navin Jaiswal	22,847	15.21%	New
JMM	Birendra Bhagat	22,173	14.77%	New
Independent	Jitendra Kumar Singh	8,716	5.80%	New
NLHP	Naim Alam	2,708	1.80%	New
RJD	Manohar Kumar Yadav	2,101	1.40%	▼11.95
Margin of victory		25	0.02%	▼4.78
Turnout		1,50,164	39.43%	▼23.26
Registered electors		3,80,866		▲120.17
INC hold		Swing	▼15.93	

=== Assembly election 2005 ===
2005 Jharkhand Legislative Assembly election: Hatia
Party	Candidate	Votes	%	±%
INC	Gopal Sharan Nath Shahdeo	46,104	42.51%	▲26.88
BJP	Krishna Kumar Poddar	40,897	43.75%	▼2.62
RJD	Abhay Kumar Singh	12,481	13.35%	▼13.38
Independent	Virendra Bhagat	12,295	13.15%	New
LJP	Uday Shanker Ojha	7,180	7.68%	New
Independent	Ramji Lal Sharda	6,327	6.77%	New
Independent	Lal Prem Prakash Nath Shahdeo	5,377	5.75%	New
Margin of victory		5,207	4.80%	▼14.84
Turnout		1,08,444	62.69%	▲11.52
Registered electors		1,72,991		▼20.45
INC gain from BJP		Swing	▼3.86	

=== Assembly election 2000 ===
2000 Bihar Legislative Assembly election: Hatia
Party	Candidate	Votes	%	±%
BJP	Ramji Lal Sharda	51,597	46.37%	New
RJD	Abhay Kumar Singh	29,741	26.73%	New
INC	Amanat Ali	17,395	15.63%	New
JMM	Mustaque Alam	4,597	4.13%	New
BSP	Praveen Kerketta	2,956	2.66%	New
Jharkhand Party	Moin Ansari	2,111	1.90%	New
Independent	Rajesh Singh	680	0.61%	New
Margin of victory		21,856	19.64%	
Turnout		1,11,266	51.84%	
Registered electors		2,17,470		
BJP win (new seat)				

== See also ==
- Vidhan Sabha
- List of states of India by type of legislature
