= Jharkhand movement =

Movement in India

- Date: 1920s–2000
- Location: Chhotanagpur and Santal Parganas regions, Bihar (now Jharkhand), India
- Goals: Achieve statehood
- Result: Statehood achieved with the Bihar Reorganisation Act, 2000

The Jharkhand movement was a long-standing political and social struggle aimed at the creation of a separate Adivasi state for the tribal regions of southern Bihar, which culminated in the formation of the state of Jharkhand on 15 November 2000. This movement primarily advocated for the rights, identity, autonomy, and socio-economic development of the tribal and indigenous communities in the Chota Nagpur and Santhal Pargana regions.

Some of the prominent leaders of the movement were Jaipal Singh Munda, Ram Narayan, Binod Bihari Mahato, and Shibu Soren.

== Early historical roots (pre–1940s): Tribal associations and demands ==
The demand for a separate tribal province goes back to the early 20th century, when educated tribal leaders and Christian missionaries began organizing social reform initiatives and political associations to address tribal concerns. One of the earliest such organizations was the Chotanagpur Unnati Samaj, which advocated for tribal rights and social development. In 1928, a delegation from the Chotanagpur Unnati Samaj submitted a memorandum to the Simon Commission, advocating the creation of a separate province for the Jharkhand region.

In the 1930s, different tribal associations including farmer organisations such as Chotanagpur Kisan Sabha and religious and caste‑specific associations, formed and expressed socio‑economic grievances, including land rights, exploitation by landlords (zamindars), and marginalization. These gradually coalesced into a broader tribal identity movement.

In 1938 the various associations merged into a more inclusive umbrella group Chotanagpur-Santhal Pargana Adivasi Sabha. By 1939, it evolved into Adivasi Mahasabha, under whose banner the demand for a separate territorial identity became more explicit.

== Intermediate phase (1950s–1960s): Political‑party beginnings ==
After independence, the tribal leaders realized that identity alone would not secure a separate state. There was a need for a political party that could contest elections and negotiate institutional change. From this emerged the Jharkhand Party, founded in about 1949-1950, with the aim of realizing Jharkhand as a separate state within democratic procedures.

The Jharkhand Party then contested elections. in the 1952 Bihar Assembly elections it won 32 seats, thus becoming a significant tribal‑based opposition. It submitted memoranda to the States Reorganisation Commission for a separate Jharkhand state, but its demand was rejected on linguistic grounds, demographic composition, economic concerns. Over time the party’s influence declined, and it merged with the dominant mainstream party the Indian National Congress in 1963.

== Revival (1970s–1980): Emergence of new organisations and broader social base ==
In 1972 various organisations merged to form the now‑famous Jharkhand Mukti Morcha (JMM). The merging groups included tribal, working‑class and other backward castes, such as Shivaji Samaj (led by non‑tribal Kurmi leader), tribal associations like Sonot Santhal Samaj, and socialist group Marxist Co-ordination Committee (led by A. K. Roy). This meant the movement now drew from a multi‑caste, mixed identity base, beyond just tribal population.

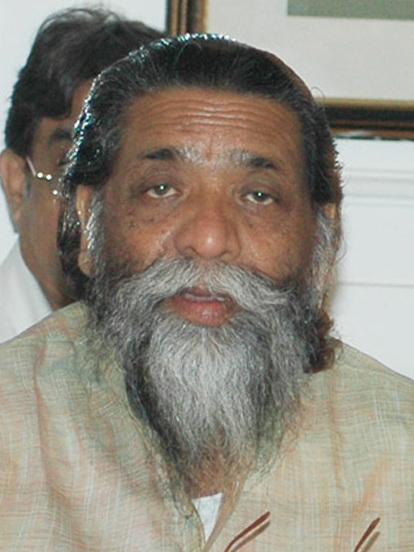
Shibu Soren, co‑founder and longtime leader of Jharkhand Mukti Morcha, a key figure in the Jharkhand movement

In 1986, youth and student activism revived the movement's energetic spirit via All Jharkhand Students Union (AJSU), founded 22 June 1986 in Jamshedpur under leadership of Surya Singh Besra. The AJSU rejected what it saw as compromise politics by existing parties and sought grassroots mobilization, land rights awareness, and cultural‑political assertion.

From the late 1980s onward, cooperation between JMM, AJSU, and other local organisations sometimes happened through coalitions like Jharkhand Coordination Committee (JCC), which attempted to unify different regional forces for the statehood demand.

== Final push and state formation (1990s—2000) ==
In 1995, a partial success came with the creation of Jharkhand Area Autonomous Council (JAAC) under state legislation. This granted limited autonomy over certain local affairs (agriculture, rural health, public works, mineral regulation) to tribal‑dominated areas, seen as a stepping stone toward full statehood.

By 1997, the (undivided) Bihar state assembly passed a resolution in favour of a separate state, a big breakthrough.

Finally, on 15 November 2000, after passage of the Bihar Reorganisation Act by the Indian Parliament, the new state Jharkhand was officially formed, comprising 18 districts carved from southern Bihar. The date is symbolically significant as it coincides with the birth anniversary of tribal leader Birsa Munda.

== Notable leaders ==
Among the prominent leaders of the Jharkhand movement have been Jaipal Singh Munda, Binod Bihari Mahato, and Shibu Soren. Munda, as early as the 1940s–50s, articulated the demand for tribal autonomy and separate statehood in the Constituent Assembly. Binod Bihari Mahato helped found the Jharkhand Mukti Morcha, which became the principal political vehicle of the movement. Shibu Soren, as co‑founder of JMM and its long‑time leader, played a key role in tribal mobilisation, land‑rights activism, and keeping the demand for statehood alive through decades of political struggle.

== See also ==
- History of Jharkhand
- Jharkhand Mukti Morcha
- Bihar Reorganisation Act, 2000
