= Jharkhand People's Party =

- Leader: Surya Singh Besra
- Founder: Ram Dayal Munda
- Founded: 30 December 1991 (34 years ago)
- Ideology: Regionalism
- ECI Status: Unrecognised Party

Jharkhand People's Party (abbr. JKPP and JPP), is a political party in India. It was launched by the radical All Jharkhand Students Union (AJSU) on 30 December 1991 at a conference in Ranchi, under the leadership of Dr. Ram Dayal Munda. AJSU was founded on 22 June 1986 by Surya Singh Besra. JPP was reconstituted in 1994, with Dr. Ram Dayal Munda as president and Surya Singh Besra as general secretary.

Later, a split occurred within the JPP. The faction led by Surya Singh Besra retained the name Jharkhand People's Party (JKPP). The other faction led by Sudesh Mahto began using the name of the parent organization — All Jharkhand Students Union (AJSU Party).
