= Navin Jaiswal =

Indian politician

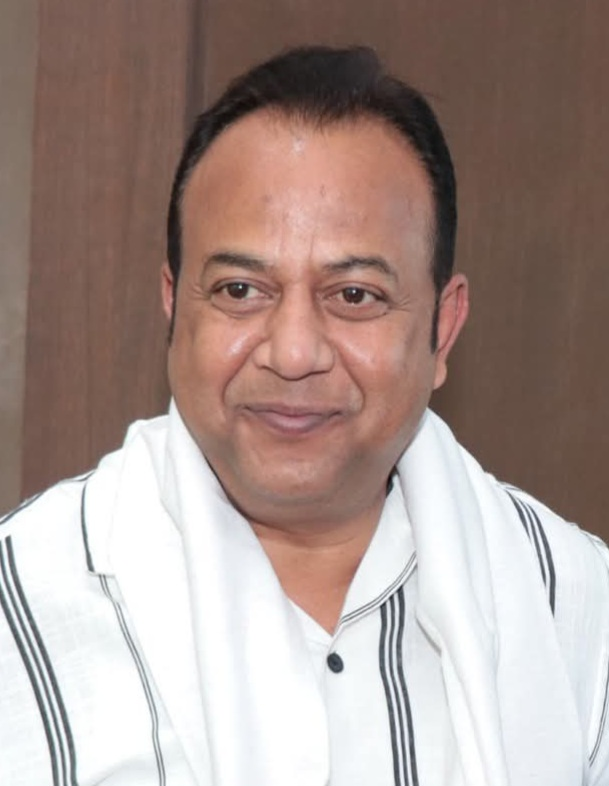

Member of the Jharkhand Legislative Assembly
- Incumbent
- Assumed office 5 December 2024
- Constituency: Hatia

Personal details
- Party: Bharatiya Janata Party
- Occupation: Politician

Navin Jaiswal is a member of Legislative Assembly of Jharkhand state, India. He represents Hatia Assembly seat as its MLA. He was member of All Jharkhand Students Union then shifting to Jharkhand Vikas Morcha (Prajatantrik) in November 2014.

In February 2015, Jaiswal was one of the six MLAs who joined the BJP, a day after petitioning the Speaker to allow them to sit alongside the ruling Bharatiya Janata Party-led coalition members in the state Assembly.
