= Giridih Lok Sabha constituency =

Constituency of the Indian parliament in Jharkhand

Coordinates: 24.19°N 86.30°E

Giridih JH-6
- Lok Sabha constituency
- Interactive Map Outlining Giridih Lok Sabha constituency

Constituency details
- Country: India
- Region: East India
- State: Jharkhand
- Assembly constituencies: Giridih; Dumri; Gomia; Bermo; Tundi; Baghmara
- Established: 1952
- Reservation: None

Member of Parliament
- 18th Lok Sabha
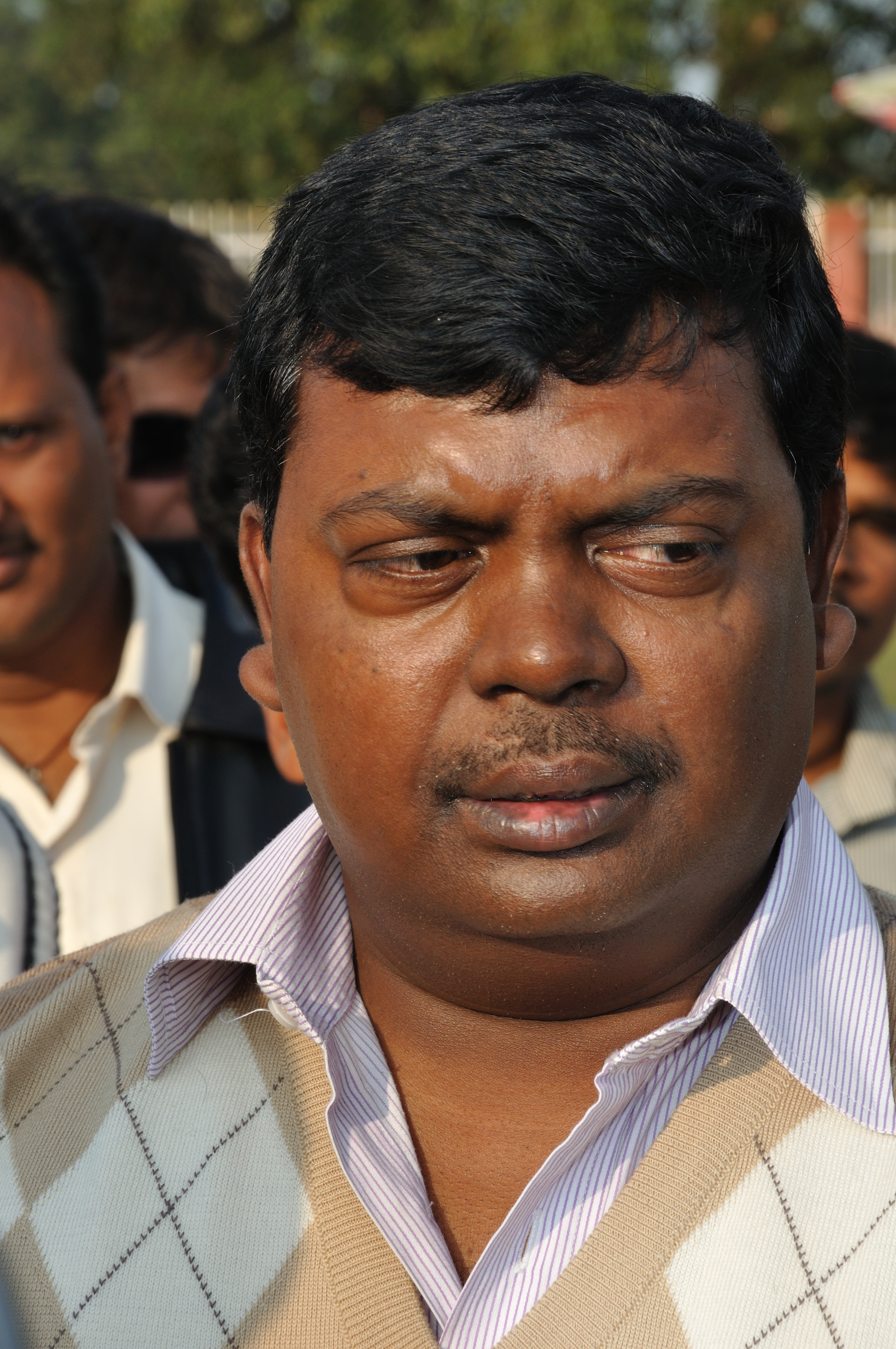
- Incumbent Chandra Prakash Choudhary
- Party: AJSU
- Alliance: NDA
- Elected year: 2024

Giridih Lok Sabha constituency is one of the 14 Lok Sabha (parliamentary) constituencies in Jharkhand state in eastern India. This constituency covers parts of Giridih, Bokaro and Dhanbad districts.

== Assembly segments ==
Presently, Giridih Lok Sabha constituency comprises the following six Vidhan Sabha (legislative assembly) segments:

#	Name	District	Member	Party	2024 Lead
32	Giridih	Giridih	Sudivya Kumar Sonu	JMM	AJSU
33	Dumri	Giridih	Jairam Kumar Mahato	JLKM	JLKM
34	Gomia	Bokaro	Yogendra Prasad	JMM	JLKM
35	Bermo	Bokaro	Kumar Jaimangal	INC	AJSU
42	Tundi	Dhanbad	Mathura Prasad Mahato	JMM	JMM
43	Baghmara	Dhanbad	Shatrughan Mahto	BJP	AJSU

== Members of Parliament ==
Year	Member	Party
1952	Nageshwar Prasad Sinha	Indian National Congress
1957	Quazi S. A. Matin	Chota Nagpur Santhal Parganas Janata Party
1962	Bateshwar Singh	Swatantra Party
1967	Imteyaz Ahmad	Indian National Congress
1971	Chapalendu Bhattacharyyia	Indian National Congress
1977	Ramdas Singh	Janata Party
1980	Bindeshwari Dubey	Indian National Congress (I)
1984	Sarfaraz Ahmad	Indian National Congress
1989	Ramdas Singh	Bharatiya Janata Party
1991	Binod Bihari Mahato	Jharkhand Mukti Morcha
1996	Ravindra Kumar Pandey	Bharatiya Janata Party
1998	Ravindra Kumar Pandey	Bharatiya Janata Party
1999	Ravindra Kumar Pandey	Bharatiya Janata Party
2004	Tek Lal Mahto	Jharkhand Mukti Morcha
2009	Ravindra Kumar Pandey	Bharatiya Janata Party
2014	Ravindra Kumar Pandey	Bharatiya Janata Party
2019	Chandra Prakash Choudhary	All Jharkhand Students Union
2024	Chandra Prakash Choudhary	All Jharkhand Students Union

== Election results ==
=== 2024 ===
2024 Indian general election: Giridih
Party	Candidate	Votes	%	±%
AJSU	Chandra Prakash Choudhary	451,139	35.67	▼22.90
JMM	Mathura Prasad Mahato	3,70,259	29.27	▼6.86
JLKM	Jairam Kumar Mahato	3,47,322	27.46	New
NOTA	None of the Above	6,044	0.48	▼1.30
RRP	Shivji Prasad	4,254	0.34	New
Majority		80,880	6.39	▼16.05
Turnout		12,65,546	67.79	
AJSU hold		Swing		

=== 2019 ===
2019 Indian general election: Giridih
Party	Candidate	Votes	%	±%
AJSU	Chandra Prakash Choudhary	648,277	58.57	▲52.85
JMM	Jagarnath Mahto	3,99,930	36.13	▼0.12
NOTA	None of the above	19,708	1.78	
Majority		2,48,347	22.44	
Turnout		11,07,150	67.12	
AJSU gain from BJP		Swing		

=== 2014 ===
2014 Indian general election: Giridih
Party	Candidate	Votes	%	±%
BJP	Ravindra Kumar Pandey	3,91,913	40.40	
JMM	Jagarnath Mahto	3,51,600	36.25	
JVM(P)	Saba Ahmad	57,380	5.92	
AJSU	Umesh Chandra Mehta	55,531	5.72	
Majority		40,313	4.16	
Turnout		9,71,242	64.25	
BJP hold		Swing		

=== 2009 ===
2009 Indian general election: Giridih
Party	Candidate	Votes	%	±%
BJP	Ravindra Kumar Pandey	2,33,435	37.70	
JMM	Tek Lal Mahto	1,38,697	22.40	
JVM(P)	Saba Ahmad	1,26,722	20.47	
Majority		94,738	15.30	
Turnout		6,19,190	45.98	
BJP gain from JMM		Swing		

=== 2004 ===
2004 Indian general election: Giridih
Party	Candidate	Votes	%	±%
JMM	Tek Lal Mahto	3,50,255	49.03	
BJP	Ravindra Kumar Pandey	2,00,461	28.06	
JD(U)	Inderdeo Mahato	81,722	11.44	
Majority		1,49,794	20.94	
Turnout		7,14,378	54.42	
JMM gain from BJP		Swing		

=== 1999 ===
1999 Indian general election: Giridih
Party	Candidate	Votes	%	±%
BJP	Ravindra Kumar Pandey	2,48,454		
INC	Rajendra Prasad Singh	2,28,630		
Majority				
Turnout				
BJP hold		Swing		

== See also ==
- Giridih district
- List of constituencies of the Lok Sabha
