= Pradeep Kumar Balmuchu =

Indian politician (born 1957)

Dr. Pradeep Kumar Balmuchu

Member of Parliament in Rajya Sabha
- In office 4 May 2012 – 3 May 2018
- Succeeded by: Dhiraj Prasad Sahu
- Constituency: Jharkhand

Speaker of the Jharkhand Legislative Assembly
- In office 2006–2011

Member of Legislative Assembly, Bihar Vidhan Sabha
- In office 1995–2000

Minister of Planning and Development, Government of Bihar
- In office 2000–2005

Personal details
- Born: 26 July 1957 (age 68) Jamshedpur, Jharkhand, India
- Party: Indian National Congress
- Spouse: Shrimati Asha Balmuchu

Dr. Pradeep Kumar Balmuchu (born 26 July 1957) is an Indian politician of Indian National Congress from Jamshedpur, Jharkhand. He was elected to Rajya Sabha from state of Jharkhand of the ticket of INC in May 2012.

He has studied B Com at Cooperative College Jamshedpur and done PhD. He resides at Dhalbhumgarh in District of East Singhbhum in Jharkhand.

== Parliamentary Committees ==
- Member, Committee on the Welfare of Scheduled Castes and Scheduled Tribes (May 2013 – May 2014)
- Member, Parliamentary Forum on Artisans and Craftspeople (April 2013 - May 2014)
- Member, Committee on Coal and Steel (Sept. 2014–Present)
- Member, Consultative Committee for the Ministry of Petroleum and Natural Gas
