= Aklu Ram Mahto =

Former finance minister of Bihar, India

Member of the Bihar Legislative Assembly
- In office 1995–2000
- Preceded by: Samresh Singh
- Succeeded by: Samresh Singh
- Constituency: Bokaro Assembly constituency

Personal details
- Born: 1940 Bokaro
- Died: 2020 (aged 79–80)
- Party: Rashtriya Janata Dal; Trinamool Congress
- Education: RSP College, Jharia
- Profession: Politician social worker, associated with organisation called Kushwaha Panchayat Parishad.

Aklu Ram Mahto (1940 – 2020) was an Indian politician from Jharkhand, who served as Minister for Finance and Institution in undivided Bihar. He was a member of Rashtriya Janata Dal, having served as important functionary in several other political parties in past. He was a member of the Bihar Legislative Assembly via Bokaro constituency. He won the Bihar Assembly Election in 1995 securing 99,798 votes. Mahto won Vidhan Sabha elections in the year 1980 and 1995. He had contested Lok Sabha elections from Dhanbad on four occasions while from Giridih and Hazaribagh once. Mahto was also associated with the movement, which started on the question of including Manbhum in West Bengal. He was one of the prominent leader to voice support for the rights of displaced people, who needed rehabilitation after the establishment of Bokaro Steel Plant. For four decades, after coming into existence of Bokaro Assembly constituency in 1977, he remained pivotal in its politics.

== Biography ==
Mahto was born on 16 May 1947, in Chas block, Narayanpur Panchayat. His ancestral village was Chaura village. He belonged to Koeri caste. (Note: Individually, each one of them has the ability to corner a sizeable number of votes. For instance, Aklu Ram Mahto, being a Koeri, has a ready bank of over 200,000 Koeri votes, while Ramendra Kumar commands a good following in the coal belt. However, ranged against each other they will eat into each other votes. The same is true about the other non-BJP candidates.) His father Lalu Mahto (Koiri) was a farmer, while his mother Chhutia Devi was a housewife. He was younger of two sons of his parents. Mahto's father, Lalu Mahto (Koiri) sent him to Asansol Primary school, to learn Bangla language. Being good at studies, he was promoted soon to higher class and completed his primary education earlier than it was about to be completed. For secondary education, he was shifted to Pindargadhiya Foundation School. Mahto completed his matriculation in 1962, from Ramrudra High School, and by 1974, he earned several degrees, which included a bachelor's degree in law. After completing his education, he was selected for an administrative job in coal mines, but did not join it. Mahto was among the people, whose land were taken by government for establishment of steel city of Bokaro. The compensation in most of the cases was not provided to them. Consequently, he became an activist for the rights of displaced, who suffered due to land acquisition. Despite clearing the interview for a post of personal manager in an institution called BSL, he refused to join it and participated in the movement against Indira Gandhi's government, after the imposition of National Emergency in India.

There were attempts to arrest him during National Emergency, but he managed to escape and after the conclusion of Emergency period, took part in active politics. He played important role in victory of A K Roy in 1977 elections. Mahto was a polymath and he knew various languages, which included Bhojpuri, Maithili, Magahi, Nagpuri, Bangla and Khortha. He also played important role in giving recognition to Khortha and Kurmali language. He was a distinguished author of Khortha language. Many of his compositions in this language were included as a part of Khortha literature.

Mahto's entry into politics was preceded by his activism. He participated in movement against inclusion of Manbhum district in West Bengal in 1956–57 at the age of eleven. Besides leaders like Parvati Charan Mahto and Janki Mahto, he led this movement through his Chas Police Station area Students Union. Mahto was soon recognised as a leader of Kushwaha community and other Backward Castes due to his activism. On 6 April 1968, he organised a blockade of Prime Minister Indira Gandhi, when she arrived in Bokaro to inaugurate the work of a steel plant. Mahto, accompanied by his followers surrounded Gandhi and latter was greeted with anti-government slogans. This protest was successful and Gandhi called the leaders of movement, including Mahto for a discussion regarding permanent solution for the displaced people. As a consequence of these deliberations, the locals, who were victims of displacement, due to establishment of Bokaro Steel City, were given priority in local jobs in steel plants. Initially, he led this movement under the umbrella of Socialist Party, but later he established 'Displaced Development Committee'.

His first experience in electoral politics of state level came in 1977, when the Bokaro Assembly constituency was just created. He had good relationship with Karpoori Thakur, but he was denied the ticket to contest from Janata Party. Consequently, he decide to fight the election as independent candidate, losing to his political rival Samresh Singh. He again contested in 1980 Bihar Legislative Assembly elections, and this time became victorious by defeating Samresh Singh, who was a candidate of Bhartiya Janata Party then. Mahto's second electoral victory came in 1995, as in 1985 and 1990 Assembly elections, he finished in second position. Mahto later served in several political parties on important positions, which include Lok Dal and Jharkhand Mukti Morcha. In his later years, he joined Rashtriya Janata Dal, but rebelled with the party after its decision to nominate Bachha Singh as its candidate from the constituency, where Mahto wanted to contest in the 2005 Assembly elections.

Mahto was also a member of Jharkhand unit of Kushwaha Mahasabha— a caste organisation of the Koeri caste along with other leaders like Bhubneshwar Prasad Mehta. From the platform of this organisation, Mahto had spoken several times about increasing political participation of the members of Kushwaha caste.

He considered the 'right to vote' as most important privilege of democracy. By 2019, Mahto retired from active politics; he was residing with his family in his native village Chaura, after quitting politics, still he motivated the youth for exercising their franchise. The Dhanbad Legislative Assembly constituency was known for high pitched political battle between Samaresh Singh and Aklu Mahto, both man represented this constituency for number of times. After being elected to Jharkhand Legislative Assembly, both political rivals aspired to become a member of parliament. However, even after contesting in Lok Sabha elections for a number of times, neither of them were able to secure victory. After retiring from politics, Aklu Mahto declared Rajesh Mahto as his political heir. Soon after retirement of Mahto, Samresh Singh also announced his retirement, declaring Sangram Singh as his political heir.

== Revolutionary ==
Mahto had played an important role in the Jharkhand movement demand for the formation of a separate Jharkhand state within the constitutional framework of independence. Mahto was an ardent follower of socialist leader Jagdeo Prasad, he had organised several commemoration ceremony for him in Bokaro.

== See also ==
- Dev Dyal Kushwaha
