= Dhanbad Assembly constituency =

Constituency of the Jharkhand legislative assembly in India

Coordinates: 23.808°N 86.438°E

Dhanbad
- Constituency No. 40 for the Jharkhand Legislative Assembly

Constituency details
- Country: India
- Region: East India
- State: Jharkhand
- District: Dhanbad
- Lok Sabha constituency: Dhanbad
- Established: 2000
- Total electors: 433,191
- Reservation: None

Member of Legislative Assembly
- 5th Jharkhand Legislative Assembly
- Incumbent Raj Sinha
- Party: Bhartiya Janta Party
- Elected year: 2024

Dhanbad Assembly constituency is an assembly constituency in the Indian state of Jharkhand.

== Members of the Legislative Assembly ==
Election	Member	Party
Bihar Legislative Assembly
1952	Purushotam Chouhan	Indian National Congress
1957	Purushotam Chouhan	Indian National Congress
1962	Sheoraj Prasad	Indian National Congress
1967	Raghubansh Singh	Indian National Congress
1969	Raghubansh Singh	Bharatiya Kranti Dal
1972	Chinmoy Mukherjee	Communist Party of India
1977	Yogeshwar Prasad 'Yogesh'	Indian National Congress
1980	Yogeshwar Prasad 'Yogesh'	Indian National Congress
1985	Surendra Prasad Roy	Indian National Congress
1990	Surendra Prasad Roy	Indian National Congress
1995	Pashupati Nath Singh	Bharatiya Janata Party
2000	Pashupati Nath Singh	Bharatiya Janata Party
Jharkhand Legislative Assembly
2005	Pashupati Nath Singh	Bharatiya Janata Party
2009	Mannan Mallick	Indian National Congress
2014	Raj Sinha	Bharatiya Janata Party
2019	Raj Sinha	Bharatiya Janata Party
2024	Raj Sinha	Bharatiya Janata Party

== Election results ==
=== Assembly election 2024 ===
2024 Jharkhand Legislative Assembly election: Dhanbad
Party	Candidate	Votes	%	±%
BJP	Raj Sinha	136,336	53.90%	▲1.59
INC	Ajay Kumar Dubey	87,595	34.63%	▼4.41
JLKM	Sapan Kumar Modak	16,664	6.59%	New
NOTA	None of the Above	1,735	0.69%	▼0.02
Margin of victory		48,741	19.27%	▲6.00
Turnout		2,52,960	54.09%	▲0.79
Registered electors		4,67,636		▲7.95
BJP hold		Swing	▲1.59	

=== Assembly election 2019 ===
2019 Jharkhand Legislative Assembly election: Dhanbad
Party	Candidate	Votes	%	±%
BJP	Raj Sinha	120,773	52.31%	▼5.83
INC	Mannan Mallick	90,144	39.04%	▲4.23
Independent	Ranjeet Singh Alias Bablu Singh	2,852	1.24%	New
LJP	Vikash Ranjan	2,426	1.05%	New
JD(U)	Vipin Kumar	1,759	0.76%	New
AJSU	Pradip Mohan Sahay	1,724	0.75%	New
JVM(P)	Saroj Kumar Singh	1,458	0.63%	▼1.21
NOTA	None of the Above	1,630	0.71%	▼0.40
Margin of victory		30,629	13.27%	▼10.06
Turnout		2,30,893	53.30%	▼5.97
Registered electors		4,33,191		▲13.00
BJP hold		Swing	▼5.83	

=== Assembly election 2014 ===
2014 Jharkhand Legislative Assembly election: Dhanbad
Party	Candidate	Votes	%	±%
BJP	Raj Sinha	132,091	58.13%	▲23.67
INC	Mannan Mallick	79,094	34.81%	▼0.22
JVM(P)	Ramesh Kumar Rahi	4,195	1.85%	New
JMM	Bhupendra Kumar	2,070	0.91%	▼2.34
Marxist Co-Ordination	Pawan Mahato	1,429	0.63%	▼1.01
BSP	Triveni Das	1,371	0.60%	New
NOTA	None of the Above	2,521	1.11%	New
Margin of victory		52,997	23.32%	▲22.76
Turnout		2,27,217	59.27%	▲16.53
Registered electors		3,83,351		▲3.15
BJP gain from INC		Swing	▲23.11	

=== Assembly election 2009 ===
2009 Jharkhand Legislative Assembly election: Dhanbad
Party	Candidate	Votes	%	±%
INC	Mannan Mallick	55,641	35.03%	▲2.06
BJP	Raj Sinha	54,751	34.47%	▼10.03
Independent	Niraj Singh	17,801	11.21%	New
Independent	Sadanand Mahato Alias Mantu Mahato	9,090	5.72%	New
JMM	Awadh Kishore Sahay	5,157	3.25%	New
LJP	Belal Khan	3,001	1.89%	▼0.88
Marxist Co-Ordination	Ajay Narayan Lall	2,602	1.64%	New
Margin of victory		890	0.56%	▼10.97
Turnout		1,58,855	42.75%	▼7.27
Registered electors		3,71,634		▼1.17
INC gain from BJP		Swing	▼9.47	

=== Assembly election 2005 ===
2005 Jharkhand Legislative Assembly election: Dhanbad
Party	Candidate	Votes	%	±%
BJP	Pashupati Nath Singh	83,692	44.50%	▼4.33
INC	Mannan Mallick	62,012	32.97%	▲16.24
RJD	Hatim Ansari	6,191	3.29%	▼17.90
LJP	Pankaj Kumar Sharma	5,200	2.76%	New
SP	Sushil Kumar Singh	4,280	2.28%	New
Jharkhand Vananchal Congress	Ram Kumar Singh Choudhary	3,237	1.72%	New
CPI(M)	Gopikant Bakshi	2,898	1.54%	New
Margin of victory		21,680	11.53%	▼16.10
Turnout		1,88,087	50.02%	▼2.45
Registered electors		3,76,039		▲29.61
BJP hold		Swing	▼4.33	

=== Assembly election 2000 ===
2000 Bihar Legislative Assembly election: Dhanbad
Party	Candidate	Votes	%	±%
BJP	Pashupati Nath Singh	74,331	48.82%	New
RJD	Prasadi Sao	32,266	21.19%	New
INC	Yogeshwar Prasad Yogesh	25,476	16.73%	New
JMM	Rekha Mandal	12,710	8.35%	New
NCP	Surendra Prasad Rai	1,795	1.18%	New
CPI	Amarendra Narayan Singh	1,657	1.09%	New
Samajwadi Jan Parishad	Bishwanath Bagi	1,345	0.88%	New
Margin of victory		42,065	27.63%	
Turnout		1,52,242	52.94%	
Registered electors		2,90,135		
BJP win (new seat)				

== See also ==
- Vidhan Sabha
- List of states of India by type of legislature
