= Dhanbad Lok Sabha constituency =

Constituency of the Indian parliament in Jharkhand

Coordinates: 23.81°N 86.44°E

Dhanbad JH-7
- Lok Sabha constituency
- Interactive Map Outlining Dhanbad Lok Sabha constituency

Constituency details
- Country: India
- Region: East India
- State: Jharkhand
- Assembly constituencies: Bokaro; Chandankiyari; Sindri; Nirsa; Dhanbad; Jharia
- Established: 1952
- Reservation: None

Member of Parliament
- 18th Lok Sabha
- Incumbent Dulu Mahato
- Party: BJP
- Alliance: NDA
- Elected year: 2024

Dhanbad Lok Sabha constituency is one of the 14 Lok Sabha (parliamentary) constituencies in Jharkhand state in eastern India. This constituency covers parts of Bokaro and Dhanbad districts.

== Assembly segments ==
Presently, Dhanbad Lok Sabha constituency comprises the following six Vidhan Sabha (legislative assembly) segments:

#	Name	District	Member	Party	2024 Lead
36	Bokaro	Bokaro	Shwettaa Singh	INC	BJP
37	Chandankiyari (SC)	Bokaro	Umakant Rajak	JMM	BJP
38	Sindri	Dhanbad	Bablu Mahato	CPI(ML)L	BJP
39	Nirsa	Dhanbad	Arup Chatterjee	CPI(ML)L	BJP
40	Dhanbad	Dhanbad	Raj Sinha	BJP	BJP
41	Jharia	Dhanbad	Ragini Singh	BJP	BJP

== Members of Parliament ==
Year	Name	Party
1952	P. C. Bose	Indian National Congress
1957	P. C. Bose	Indian National Congress
1962	P. R. Chakravarti	Indian National Congress
1967	Rani Lalita Rajya Laxmi	Independent
1971	Ram Narain Sharma	Indian National Congress
1977	A. K. Roy	Marxist Coordination Committee
1980	A. K. Roy	Marxist Coordination Committee
1984	Shankar Dayal Singh	Indian National Congress
1989	A. K. Roy	Communist Party of India (Marxist)
1991	Rita Verma	Bharatiya Janata Party
1996	Rita Verma	Bharatiya Janata Party
1998	Rita Verma	Bharatiya Janata Party
1999	Rita Verma	Bharatiya Janata Party
2004	Chandra Shekhar Dubey	Indian National Congress
2009	Pashupati Nath Singh	Bharatiya Janata Party
2014	Pashupati Nath Singh	Bharatiya Janata Party
2019	Pashupati Nath Singh	Bharatiya Janata Party
2024	Dulu Mahato	Bharatiya Janata Party

== Election result ==
=== 2024 ===
2024 Indian general election: Dhanbad
Party	Candidate	Votes	%	±%
BJP	Dulu Mahato	789,172	55.26	
INC	Anupama Singh	4,57,789	32.04	
Independent	Eklak Ansari	79,653	5.58	
NOTA	None of the above	7,354	0.51	
Majority		3,31,583		
Turnout		14,31,957	62.52	
BJP hold		Swing		

=== 2019 ===
2019 Indian general elections: Dhanbad
Party	Candidate	Votes	%	±%
BJP	Pashupati Nath Singh	827,234	66.03	
INC	Kirti Azad	3,41,040	27.22	
AITC	Madhvi Singh	8,235	0.66	
NOTA	None of the above	4,345	0.38	
Majority		4,86,194	38.81	
Turnout		12,53,265	60.47	−0.07
BJP hold		Swing		

=== General election 2014 ===
2014 Indian general elections: Dhanbad
Party	Candidate	Votes	%	±%
BJP	Pashupati Nath Singh	5,43,491	47.51	
INC	Ajay Kumar Dubey	2,50,537	21.90	
MCC	Anand Mahato	1,10,185	9.63	
JVM(P)	Samresh Singh	90,926	7.95	
AITC	Chandra Shekhar Dubey	29,937	2.62	
AJSU	Hemlata S. Mohan	21,277	1.81	New
NOTA	None of the above	7,675	0.67	New
Majority		2,92,954	25.61	
Turnout		11,43,945	60.53	
BJP hold		Swing		

=== General election 2009 ===
2009 Indian general elections: Dhanbad
Party	Candidate	Votes	%	±%
BJP	Pashupati Nath Singh	2,60,521	31.99	
INC	Chandra Shekhar Dubey	2,02,474	24.86	
BSP	Samaresh Singh	1,32,445	16.26	
MCC	A. K. Roy	85,457	10.49	
Majority		58,047	7.14	
Turnout		8,14,208	45.07	
BJP gain from INC		Swing		

== See also ==
- Dhanbad district
- List of constituencies of the Lok Sabha
