= Chandankiyari Assembly constituency =

Constituency of the Jharkhand legislative assembly in India

Coordinates: 23°34′34″N 86°21′03″E

Chandankiyari
- Constituency No. 37 for the Jharkhand Legislative Assembly

Constituency details
- Country: India
- Region: East India
- State: Jharkhand
- District: Bokaro
- Lok Sabha constituency: Dhanbad
- Established: 2000
- Total electors: 240,900
- Reservation: SC

Member of Legislative Assembly
- 6th Jharkhand Legislative Assembly
- Incumbent Umakant Rajak
- Party: JMM
- Alliance: MGB
- Elected year: 2024

Chandankiyari Assembly constituency is an assembly constituency in the Indian state of Jharkhand. It is reserved for scheduled castes.

== Overview ==
Chandankiyari (Vidhan Sabha constituency covers: Chandankiyari police station, Siyaljori police station, and Sabra, Chandra, Lalpur, Kumirdoba, Kalikapur, Mahal, Bhojudih, Bijulia, Alkusa, Buribinor, Khamarbendi, Dudhigajar, Kura Dabartupara, Jaitara, Pundru and Sardaha gram panchayats in Chas police station in Chas sub-division of Bokaro district.

Chandankiyari is part of Dhanbad (Lok Sabha constituency).

== Members of the Legislative Assembly ==
Election	Member	Party
Bihar Legislative Assembly
Before 1967: Constituency did not exist
1967	S. B. Bauri	Independent politician
1969	Durga Charan Das	Bharatiya Kranti Dal
1972	Durga Charan Das	Indian National Congress
1977	Ram Das Ram	Indian National Congress
1980	Haru Rajwar	Independent politician
1985	Lata Devi	Indian National Congress
1990	Gaur Harijan	Bharatiya Janata Party
1995	Gaur Harijan	Independent politician
2000	Haru Rajwar	Jharkhand Mukti Morcha
Jharkhand Legislative Assembly
2005	Haru Rajwar	Jharkhand Mukti Morcha
2009	Umakant Rajak	All Jharkhand Students Union
2014	Amar Kumar Bauri	Jharkhand Vikas Morcha
2019	Amar Kumar Bauri	Bharatiya Janata Party
2024	Umakant Rajak	Jharkhand Mukti Morcha

== Election results ==
=== Assembly election 2024 ===
2024 Jharkhand Legislative Assembly election: Chandankiyari
Party	Candidate	Votes	%	±%
JMM	Umakant Rajak	90,027	42.56	▲22.13
JLKM	Arjun Rajwar	56,294	26.61	New
BJP	Amar Kumar Bauri	56,091	26.52	▼11.51
Independent	Mamta Khetrapal	1,809	0.86	New
Independent	Jagannath Rajwar	1,605	0.76	New
NOTA	None of the Above	3,399	1.61	▼0.58
Margin of victory		33,733	15.95	▲10.78
Turnout		2,11,513	75.26	▲1.32
Registered electors		2,81,049		▲16.67
JMM gain from BJP		Swing	▲4.53	

=== Assembly election 2019 ===
2019 Jharkhand Legislative Assembly election: Chandankiyari
Party	Candidate	Votes	%	±%
BJP	Amar Kumar Bauri	67,739	38.03	New
AJSU	Umakant Rajak	58,528	32.86	▲3.03
JMM	Bijay Kumar Rajwar	36,400	20.44	▲14.70
Independent	Bholanath Bauri	2,694	1.51	New
Independent	Ganesh Kumar Das	2,033	1.14	New
JVM(P)	Rohit Kumar Das	1,524	0.86	▼50.32
Marxist Co-Ordination	Lal Mohan Rajwar	1,391	0.78	▼4.48
NOTA	None of the Above	3,896	2.19	▼0.39
Margin of victory		9,211	5.17	▼16.17
Turnout		1,78,123	73.94	▲0.52
Registered electors		2,40,900		▲10.48
BJP gain from JVM(P)		Swing	▼13.14	

=== Assembly election 2014 ===
2014 Jharkhand Legislative Assembly election: Chandankiyari
Party	Candidate	Votes	%	±%
JVM(P)	Amar Kumar Bauri	81,925	51.17	▲23.62
AJSU	Umakant Rajak	47,761	29.83	▼0.64
JMM	Haru Rajwar	9,189	5.74	▼4.76
Marxist Co-Ordination	Bama Pada Sahish	8,416	5.26	New
INC	Ashari Bauri	4,045	2.53	New
SP	Samar Turi	1,262	0.79	New
Independent	Geeta Devi	997	0.62	New
NOTA	None of the Above	4,119	2.57	New
Margin of victory		34,164	21.34	▲18.41
Turnout		1,60,097	73.42	▲8.71
Registered electors		2,18,047		▲17.42
JVM(P) gain from AJSU		Swing	▲20.70	

=== Assembly election 2009 ===
2009 Jharkhand Legislative Assembly election: Chandankiyari
Party	Candidate	Votes	%	±%
AJSU	Umakant Rajak	36,620	30.47	▲17.91
JVM(P)	Amar Kumar Bauri	33,103	27.55	New
JD(U)	Haru Rajwar	13,176	10.96	▲6.51
JMM	Santosh Rajwar	12,623	10.50	▼5.84
Independent	Sristidhar Rajwar	6,981	5.81	New
AITC	Satish Chandra Rajak	2,070	1.72	New
CPI(M)	Dubraj Das	1,843	1.53	New
Margin of victory		3,517	2.93	▼0.85
Turnout		1,20,167	64.71	▲8.70
Registered electors		1,85,706		▼4.64
AJSU gain from JMM		Swing	▲14.13	

=== Assembly election 2005 ===
2005 Jharkhand Legislative Assembly election: Chandankiyari
Party	Candidate	Votes	%	±%
JMM	Haru Rajwar	17,823	16.34	▼26.30
AJSU	Umakant Rajak	13,706	12.57	New
Jharkhand Vananchal Congress	Amar Kumar Bauri	12,509	11.47	New
Independent	Satish Chandra Rajak	12,299	11.28	New
SP	Dilip Bauri	6,555	6.01	▲3.08
Independent	Suresh Rai	5,392	4.94	New
JD(U)	Gaur Chand Bauri	4,861	4.46	New
Margin of victory		4,117	3.77	▼18.68
Turnout		1,09,069	56.00	▲2.40
Registered electors		1,94,752		▲18.93
JMM hold		Swing	▼26.30	

=== Assembly election 2000 ===
2000 Bihar Legislative Assembly election: Chandankiyari
Party	Candidate	Votes	%	±%
JMM	Haru Rajwar	37,431	42.64	New
Independent	Satish Chandra Rajak	17,721	20.19	New
BJP	Gour Harijan	11,089	12.63	New
INC	Hira Lal Bauri	7,484	8.53	New
CPI	Jagadish Rajak	2,580	2.94	New
SP	Dilip Bauri	2,575	2.93	New
SAP	Meera Kishore	2,099	2.39	New
Margin of victory		19,710	22.45	
Turnout		87,782	54.32	
Registered electors		1,63,755		
JMM win (new seat)				

== See also ==
- Vidhan Sabha
- List of states of India by type of legislature
