= Bokaro Assembly constituency =

Constituency of the Jharkhand legislative assembly in India

Coordinates: 23.792°N 85.889°E

Bokaro
- Constituency No. 36 for the Jharkhand Legislative Assembly

Constituency details
- Country: India
- Region: East India
- State: Jharkhand
- District: Bokaro
- Lok Sabha constituency: Dhanbad
- Established: 2000
- Total electors: 526,660
- Reservation: None

Member of Legislative Assembly
- 5th Jharkhand Legislative Assembly
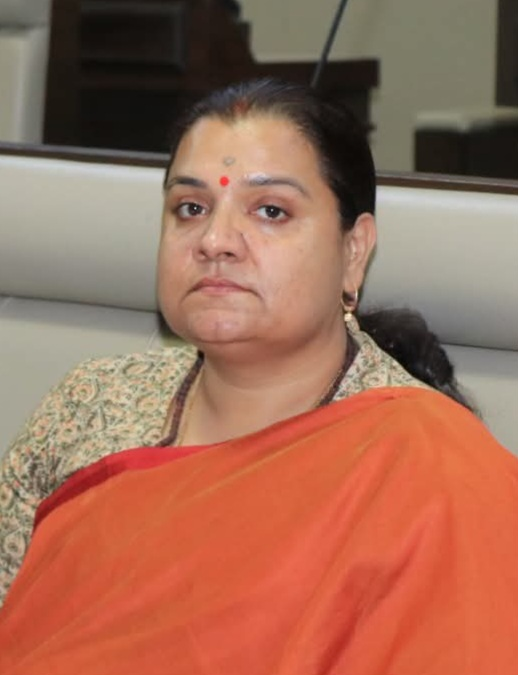
- Incumbent Shwettaa Singh
- Party: INC
- Alliance: MGB
- Elected year: 2024
- Preceded by: Biranchi Narayan, BJP

Bokaro Assembly constituency is an assembly constituency in the Indian state of Jharkhand. Bokaro was part of Bihar of Assembly before the bifurcation of the state in 2000 which led to the creation of Jharkhand.

== Members of the Legislative Assembly ==
Election	Member	Party
Bihar Legislative Assembly
Before 1977: Constituency did not exist
1977	Samresh Singh	Independent politician
1980	Aklu Ram Mahto	Janata Party
1985	Samresh Singh	Bharatiya Janata Party
1990	Samresh Singh	Bharatiya Janata Party
1995	Aklu Ram Mahto	Janata Dal
2000	Samresh Singh	Independent politician
Jharkhand Legislative Assembly
2005	Izrail Ansari	Indian National Congress
2009	Samresh Singh	Jharkhand Vikas Morcha
2014	Biranchi Narayan	Bharatiya Janata Party
2019	Biranchi Narayan	Bharatiya Janata Party
2024	Shwettaa Singh	Indian National Congress

== Election results ==
=== Assembly election 2024 ===
2024 Jharkhand Legislative Assembly election: Bokaro
Party	Candidate	Votes	%	±%
INC	Shwettaa Singh	133,438	42.34%	▲5.83
BJP	Biranchi Narayan	1,26,231	40.05%	▼1.37
JLKM	Saroj Kumari	39,621	12.57%	New
BSP	Rajesh Kumar	2,817	0.89%	New
NOTA	None of the Above	3,730	1.18%	▲0.22
Margin of victory		7,207	2.29%	▼2.62
Turnout		3,15,173	53.94%	▲2.44
Registered electors		5,84,275		▲10.94
INC gain from BJP		Swing	▲0.92	

=== Assembly election 2019 ===
2019 Jharkhand Legislative Assembly election: Bokaro
Party	Candidate	Votes	%	±%
BJP	Biranchi Narayan	112,333	41.42%	▼1.96
INC	Shweta Singh	99,020	36.51%	▲25.77
AJSU	Rajendra Mahato	14,517	5.35%	New
JVM(P)	Prakash Kumar	13,872	5.11%	▼2.52
AIMIM	Masakur Alam Siddiki	5,401	1.99%	New
Independent	Sanjay Kumar	3,148	1.16%	New
Independent	Jayanti Kumari	2,226	0.82%	New
NOTA	None of the Above	2,615	0.96%	▲0.25
Margin of victory		13,313	4.91%	▼22.66
Turnout		2,71,225	51.50%	▼1.97
Registered electors		5,26,660		▲6.86
BJP hold		Swing	▼1.96	

=== Assembly election 2014 ===
2014 Jharkhand Legislative Assembly election: Bokaro
Party	Candidate	Votes	%	±%
BJP	Biranchi Narayan	114,321	43.38%	New
Independent	Samresh Singh	41,678	15.81%	New
INC	Manjur Ansari	28,295	10.74%	▼8.04
JVM(P)	Izrail Ansari	20,120	7.63%	▼19.32
JMM	Mantu Kumar Yadav	13,922	5.28%	▼1.03
Independent	Rajesh Kumar	8,501	3.23%	New
RJD	Awadhesh Singh Yadav	6,167	2.34%	▼5.53
NOTA	None of the Above	1,891	0.72%	New
Margin of victory		72,643	27.56%	▲19.39
Turnout		2,63,538	53.47%	▲8.59
Registered electors		4,92,853		▲10.91
BJP gain from JVM(P)		Swing	▲16.43	

=== Assembly election 2009 ===
2009 Jharkhand Legislative Assembly election: Bokaro
Party	Candidate	Votes	%	±%
JVM(P)	Samresh Singh	53,757	26.95%	New
INC	Izrail Ansari	37,452	18.78%	▼1.41
JD(U)	Shailendra Mahto	34,759	17.43%	▼0.49
RJD	Aklu Ram Mahto	15,690	7.87%	▼4.87
JMM	Mantu Kumar Yadav	12,595	6.31%	New
AJSU	Ahsanu Ullah Sah	5,841	2.93%	New
Independent	Rajendra Mahto	5,606	2.81%	New
Margin of victory		16,305	8.17%	▲5.91
Turnout		1,99,452	44.88%	▼3.05
Registered electors		4,44,370		▼4.32
JVM(P) gain from INC		Swing	▲6.77	

=== Assembly election 2005 ===
2005 Jharkhand Legislative Assembly election: Bokaro
Party	Candidate	Votes	%	±%
INC	Izrail Ansari	44,939	20.19%	New
JD(U)	Ashok Chaudhary	39,898	17.92%	New
Jharkhand Vananchal Congress	Samresh Singh	35,644	16.01%	New
RJD	Bachcha Singh	28,365	12.74%	New
Independent	Aklu Ram Mahto	16,109	7.24%	New
Independent	Rajendra Mahto	8,043	3.61%	New
SP	Sadhu Sharan Gope	6,819	3.06%	▼4.74
Margin of victory		5,041	2.26%	▼29.57
Turnout		2,22,623	47.94%	▼7.99
Registered electors		4,64,418		▲29.35
INC gain from Independent		Swing	▼28.47	

=== Assembly election 2000 ===
2000 Bihar Legislative Assembly election: Bokaro
Party	Candidate	Votes	%	±%
Independent	Samresh Singh	97,712	48.66%	New
SAP	Ashok Choudhary	33,779	16.82%	New
SP	Aklu Ram Mahto	15,673	7.80%	New
JMM	Yogeshwar Mahato	10,421	5.19%	New
Independent	Sadhu Sharan Gope	8,240	4.10%	New
CPI	Anirudh	7,910	3.94%	New
SJP(R)	Birendra Singh	5,962	2.97%	New
Margin of victory		63,933	31.84%	
Turnout		2,00,810	56.63%	
Registered electors		3,59,043		
Independent win (new seat)				

== See also ==
- List of constituencies of the Jharkhand Legislative Assembly
