= Chandra Shekhar Dubey =

Indian politician (1946 – 2025)

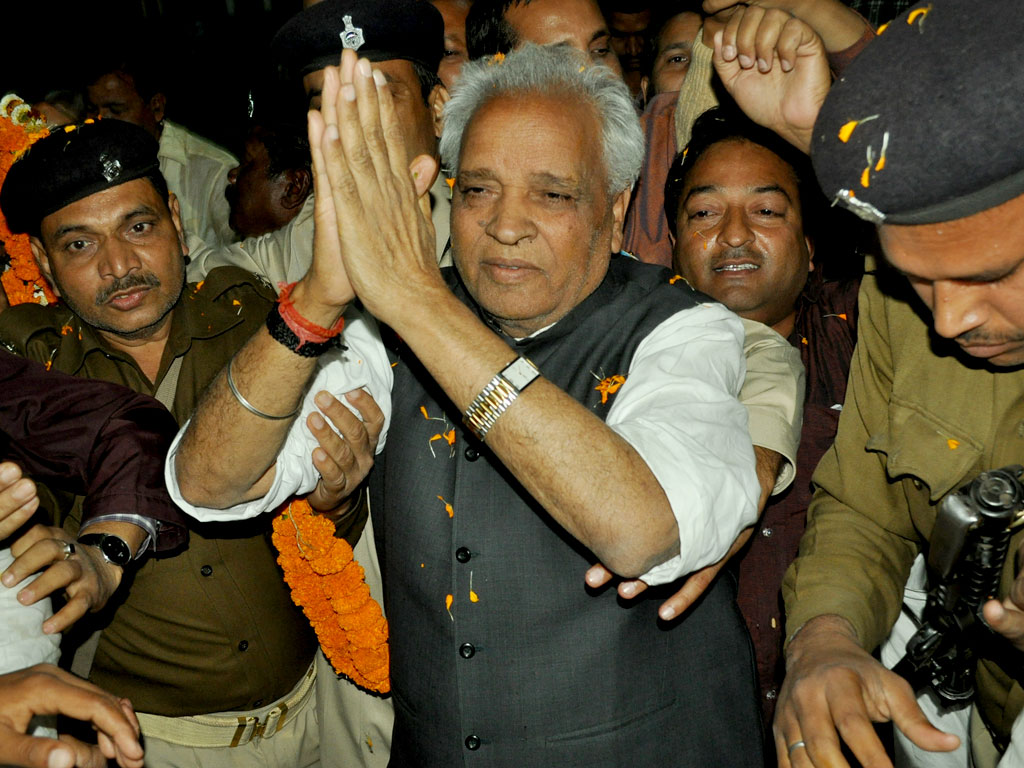

Member of Parliament, Lok Sabha
- In office 2004–2009
- Preceded by: Rita Verma
- Succeeded by: Pashupati Nath Singh
- Constituency: Dhanbad

Member of Bihar Legislative Assembly
- In office (1985-1990), (1990-1995), (2000 – 2005)
- Preceded by: Vinod Singh
- Succeeded by: Ramchandra Chandravanshi
- Constituency: Bishrampur Vidhan Sabha constituency

Member of Jharkhand Legislative Assembly
- In office (2009–2014)
- Succeeded by: Ramchandra Chandravanshi
- Constituency: Bishrampur Vidhan Sabha constituency

Personal details
- Born: Garhwa, Bihar Province, British India
- Died: 10 July 2025 (aged 79) Delhi, India
- Party: Indian National Congress
- Spouse: Dulari Devi
- Children: 3
- As of 29 December, 2015 Source: []

Chandra Shekhar Dubey (died 10 July 2025), also known as Dadai Dubey, was an Indian politician who served as a cabinet minister in the Jharkhand government. He was an elected MLA of Bishrampur (Vidhan Sabha constituency). Dadai Dubey was a member of the Indian National Congress political party. Chandrashekhar Dubey was also member of the 14th Lok Sabha of India. He represented the Dhanbad constituency of Jharkhand. Chandrashekhar Dubey was made the state rural development minister in Jharkhand in Hemant Soren government in August 2013. Dubey was also the general secretary of Rashtiya Koyla Mazdoor Sangh affiliated with INTUC. Chandrashekhar Dubey was also a senate member of Nilamber Pitamber University, nominated by Hon'ble Speaker of Jharkhand Legislative Assembly. In July 2015, Dadai Dubey was arrested for misbehaving with the police and was sent to judicial custody.

== Political career ==
- 1970–77 – Mukhia
- 1977–2009 – Representative, Indian National Trade Union Congress
- 1985–1995 & 2000-2005 – Member, Bihar Legislative Assembly (Three Terms)
- 2000 – Minister of Labour and Employment in Rabri Devi government in Bihar
- 2004 – Elected to 14th Lok Sabha, Member from Dhanbad, Committee on Coal and Steel, Member- Consultative Committee on Coal & Mines "Governor finds admirer in ex-MP". The Telegraph. Calcutta, India. 2 October 2009. Archived from the original on 29 October 2013.
- 5 August 2007 onwards – Member, Standing Committee on Coal
- 2013 – MLA, Bishrampur (Vidhan Sabha constituency), Jharkhand; Cabinet Minister, Jharkhand- Gram Vikas, Panchayati raj, Labour and Employment.

== Death ==
Dubey died on 10 July 2025, at the age of 87.
