= Amar Kumar Bauri =

Indian politician (born 1978)

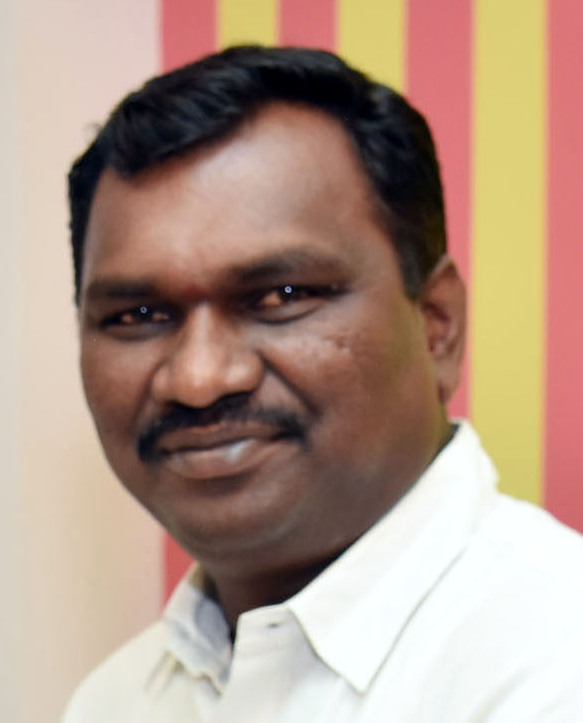

Leader of the Opposition Jharkhand Legislative Assembly
- In office 16 October 2023 – 23 November 2024
- Chief Minister: Hemant Soren
- Preceded by: Babulal Marandi
- Succeeded by: Babulal Marandi

Minister of Revenue Government of Jharkhand
- In office 19 February 2015 – 29 December 2019
- Chief Minister: Raghubar Das
- Succeeded by: Hemant Soren

Member of Jharkhand Legislative Assembly
- In office 23 December 2014 – 23 November 2024
- Preceded by: Umakant Rajak
- Succeeded by: Umakant Rajak
- Constituency: Chandankiyari (SC)

Personal details
- Born: 25 November 1978 (age 47) Chandankiyari, Bihar, India (now in Jharkhand)
- Party: Bharatiya Janata Party

Amar Kumar Bauri (born 25 November 1978) is an Indian politician and former leader of the opposition in Jharkhand Legislative Assembly. He is the member of the Bharatiya Janata Party. He was Minister of Jharkhand. Earlier he was associated with Jharkhand Vikas Morcha (Prajatantrik) led by Babulal Marandi till Jharkhand Vidhan Sabha election in 2014. He was a member of Jharkhand legislative assembly from Chandankiyari constituency which is reserved for scheduled castes in Bokaro District.

== Early life ==
He was born in year 1978 to Ram Nath Bauri. He passed matriculation from R.D. Tata High School Jamshedpur in 1994, Inter from Co-operative College Jamshedpur in 1997, completed graduation from same Jamshedpur Cooperative College and post graduate in history from Ranchi University in 2005. He also completed Bachelor of Education from the Vinobha Bhave University Hazaribag in 2008.

== Political career ==
Bauri made his electoral debut in 2004 as an independent candidate unsuccessfully. In the 2009 Assembly election, he had contested on the JVM (P)’s ticket from Chandankiyari, but had lost to Umakant Rajak of AJSU by a margin of 3517 votes. In the 2014 Assembly election, Bauri was elected as an MLA from Chandankiyari on the ticket of JVM (P) ticket, but soon he, along with five other party MLAs, joined the BJP-led government, merging their breakaway JVM (P) Legislature Party with the BJP.

Bauri was inducted as Revenue and Tourism minister in the Raghubar Das ministry on 19 February 2015. He took some significant decisions such as building the Patratu Valley road and launching several religious tourism festivals. He had digitized a part of the land records and also started the popular Re 1 charge on properties registered in the name of women members in 2017 in a bid to empower them within their households – a scheme which was scrapped by the current JMM-led government headed by CM Hemant Soren in 2020.

On 16 October 2023 he was appointed as the lleader of the opposition in Jharkhand Legislative Assembly replacing Babulal Marandi who had been appointed as the President of BJP Jharkhand.

He lost election in 2024 and was succeeded by Babulal Marandi as the leader of opposition.
