= Bishrampur Assembly constituency =

Constituency of the Jharkhand legislative assembly in India

Coordinates: 24.26°N 83.92°E

Bishrampur
- Constituency No. 77 for the Jharkhand Legislative Assembly

Constituency details
- Country: India
- Region: East India
- State: Jharkhand
- District: Palamu
- Lok Sabha constituency: Palamu
- Established: 2000
- Total electors: 309,629
- Reservation: None

Member of Legislative Assembly
- 6th Jharkhand Legislative Assembly
- Incumbent Naresh Prasad Singh
- Party: RJD
- Alliance: MGB
- Elected year: 2024

Bishrampur Assembly constituency is an assembly constituency in the Palamu district in Indian state of Jharkhand.

== Members of Legislative Assembly ==
Year	Name	Party
Bihar Legislative Assembly
Before 1962: Constituency did not exist
1962	Krishna Murari Singh	Swatantra Party
1967	Ramdeni Ram	Indian National Congress
1969	Jageshwar Ram	Bharatiya Jana Sangh
1972	Ramdeni Ram	Indian National Congress
1977	Vinod Singh	Independent politician
1980	Vinod Singh	Janata Party
1985	Chandra Shekhar Dubey	Indian National Congress
1990	Chandra Shekhar Dubey	Indian National Congress
1995	Ramchandra Chandravanshi	Janata Dal
2000	Chandra Shekhar Dubey	Indian National Congress
Jharkhand Legislative Assembly
2005	Ramchandra Chandravanshi	Rashtriya Janata Dal
2009	Chandra Shekhar Dubey	Indian National Congress
2014	Ramchandra Chandravanshi	Bharatiya Janata Party
2019	Ramchandra Chandravanshi	Bharatiya Janata Party
2024	Naresh Prasad Singh	Rashtriya Janata Dal

== Election results ==
=== Assembly election 2024 ===
2024 Jharkhand Legislative Assembly election: Bishrampur
Party	Candidate	Votes	%	±%
RJD	Naresh Prasad Singh	74,338	32.34	New
BJP	Ramchandra Chandravanshi	59,751	25.99	▲4.40
BSP	Rajesh Mehta	24,272	10.56	▼6.51
SP	Anju Singh	21,808	9.49	New
Independent	Jagriti Dubey	18,009	7.83	New
ASP(KR)	Sirajuddin Khan	5,318	2.31	New
Independent	Brahmdeo Prasad	4,946	2.15	New
NOTA	None of the Above	892	0.39	▼0.34
Margin of victory		14,587	6.35	▲1.82
Turnout		2,29,859	63.90	▲3.12
Registered electors		3,59,702		▲16.17
RJD gain from BJP		Swing	▲10.75	

=== Assembly election 2019 ===
2019 Jharkhand Legislative Assembly election: Bishrampur
Party	Candidate	Votes	%	±%
BJP	Ramchandra Chandravanshi	40,635	21.59	▼1.10
BSP	Rajesh Mehta	32,122	17.07	▲5.63
Independent	Naresh Prasad Singh	27,820	14.78	New
INC	Chandra Shekhar Dubey	26,957	14.32	▲0.93
JVM(P)	Anju Singh	24,851	13.20	▲5.01
AIMIM	Asharphi Ram	11,558	6.14	New
JD(U)	Brahmdeo Prasad	7,928	4.21	New
NOTA	None of the Above	1,376	0.73	▲0.15
Margin of victory		8,513	4.52	▼4.77
Turnout		1,88,207	60.78	▼0.53
Registered electors		3,09,629		▲13.46
BJP hold		Swing	▼1.10	

=== Assembly election 2014 ===
2014 Jharkhand Legislative Assembly election: Bishrampur
Party	Candidate	Votes	%	±%
BJP	Ramchandra Chandravanshi	37,974	22.70	New
INC	Ajay Kumar Dubey	22,417	13.40	▼7.37
BSP	Asharphi Ram	19,145	11.44	▲1.66
JVM(P)	Rajesh Mehta	13,709	8.19	New
SP	Shiv Poojan Yadav	10,715	6.40	New
Independent	Brahmdeo Prasad	9,862	5.89	New
JMM	Anwar Hussain Ansari	9,741	5.82	▼7.24
NOTA	None of the Above	975	0.58	New
Margin of victory		15,557	9.30	▲2.52
Turnout		1,67,321	61.31	▲11.16
Registered electors		2,72,888		▲11.00
BJP gain from INC		Swing	▲1.93	

=== Assembly election 2009 ===
2009 Jharkhand Legislative Assembly election: Bishrampur
Party	Candidate	Votes	%	±%
INC	Chandra Shekhar Dubey	25,609	20.77	▲6.34
RJD	Ramchandra Chandravanshi	17,257	14.00	▼12.62
JMM	Yugal Pal	16,102	13.06	New
BSP	Awdhesh Kumar Singh	12,063	9.78	▲1.60
JD(U)	Chandra Shekhar Dubey	8,866	7.19	New
Communist Party of India (Marxist Leninist) Liberation	Anwar Hussain Ansari	7,525	6.10	New
AJSU	Kaushal Kumar	6,803	5.52	New
Margin of victory		8,352	6.77	▼5.41
Turnout		1,23,308	50.16	▼14.13
Registered electors		2,45,853		▲3.46
INC gain from RJD		Swing	▼5.84	

=== Assembly election 2005 ===
2005 Jharkhand Legislative Assembly election: Bishrampur
Party	Candidate	Votes	%	±%
RJD	Ramchandra Chandravanshi	40,658	26.61	▼4.05
INC	Ajay Kumar Dubey	22,046	14.43	▼28.69
BJP	Krishna Kumar Mishra	15,313	10.02	▼3.81
Independent	Nirbhay Kumar Singh	13,687	8.96	New
BSP	Asharphi Ram	12,501	8.18	▲1.72
LJP	Chandra Shekhar Dubey	6,570	4.30	New
SAP	Dr. Asarfi Mehta	3,900	2.55	New
Margin of victory		18,612	12.18	▼0.27
Turnout		1,52,776	64.29	▲8.69
Registered electors		2,37,637		▲28.57
RJD gain from INC		Swing	▼16.51	

=== Assembly election 2000 ===
2000 Bihar Legislative Assembly election: Bishrampur
Party	Candidate	Votes	%	±%
INC	Chandra Shekhar Dubey	44,308	43.12	New
RJD	Ramchandra Chandravanshi	31,511	30.67	New
BJP	Surya Mani Singh	14,212	13.83	New
BSP	Manikchandra Ram	6,642	6.46	New
Communist Party of India (Marxist Leninist) Liberation	Jagdeo Sharma	2,575	2.51	New
Independent	Rajkishore Singh	1,611	1.57	New
JMM	Sanjay Kumar Chaubey	888	0.86	New
Margin of victory		12,797	12.45	
Turnout		1,02,757	56.77	
Registered electors		1,84,830		
INC win (new seat)				

== See also ==
- Palamu district
- Palamu division
- Vidhan Sabha
- List of states of India by type of legislature
