= Rita Verma =

Indian politician

Prof. Rita Verma
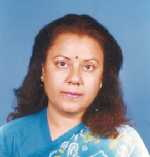

Minister of State Government of India
- In office 13 October 1999 – 29 January 2003
- Ministry: Term
- Minister of Education: 1 September 2001 - 29 January 2003
- Minister of Rural Development: 30 September 2000 - 1 September 2001
- Minister of Health & Family Welfare: 27 May 2000 - 30 September 2000
- Minister of Mines: 13 October 1999 - 27 May 2000

Member of Parliament Lok Sabha
- In office 20 June 1991 – 14 May 2004
- Preceded by: A. K. Roy
- Succeeded by: Chandra Shekhar Dubey
- Constituency: Dhanbad

Personal details
- Born: 15 July 1953 (age 72) Patna, Bihar, India
- Party: Bharatiya Janata Party
- Spouse: Randhir Prasad Verma (m. 1976; died 1991)
- Parent(s): R. N. Prasad; Sarojini Prasad
- Education: Master of Arts in History; PhD
- Alma mater: Patna University
- Profession: Teacher, Educationist, Social Worker

Rita Verma (born 15 July 1953 in Patna) is an Indian politician and a member of the Bharatiya Janata Party. She is a former Minister of State of Mines and Minerals in the Indian government. She is a member of the faculty at SSLNT Women's College, Dhanbad in the subject of History.

Verma studied at Patna University, and taught history in Ranchi University. She was elected to the 10th Lok Sabha in 1991 from Dhanbad constituency in Bihar. She was re-elected to the Lok Sabha in 1996, 1998 and 1999 from the same constituency. She is widow of Randhir Prasad Verma, an IPS of Bihar cadre from 1974 batch who sacrificed his life while foiling an attempt to a bank robbery in Dhanbad where he was serving as the Superintendent of Police.

== Early life ==
Mrs. Rita Verma was born in a karna Kayastha Family.

== Positions held ==
- 1999-2000 Minister of State of Mines and Minerals
- 2000 Minister of State of Health and Family Welfare
- 2000-01 Minister of State of Rural Development
- 2001-03 Minister of State of Human Resources Development

She was Member of Panel of Chairmen of Lok Sabha during 1996-97 and 1998–99 and Whip of the Bharatiya Janata Party (BJP) Parliamentary Party in 1998.
