= Shwettaa Singh =

Indian politician

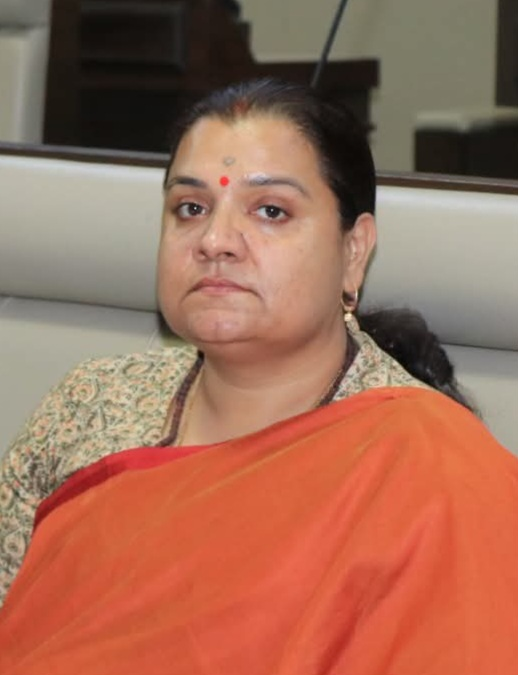

Member of the Jharkhand Legislative Assembly
- Incumbent
- Assumed office 23 November 2024
- Preceded by: Biranchi Narayan
- Constituency: Bokaro

Personal details
- Party: Indian National Congress
- Profession: Politician

Shwettaa Singh is an Indian politician from Jharkhand. She is a member of the Jharkhand Legislative Assembly from 2024, representing Bokaro Assembly constituency as a member of the Indian National Congress.

== See also ==
- List of chief ministers of Jharkhand
- Maharashtra Legislative Assembly
