= Ramchandra Chandravanshi =

Indian politician

Member of Jharkhand Legislative Assembly Bishrampur
- In office 2014–2024
- Preceded by: Chandra Shekhar Dubey
- Succeeded by: Naresh Prasad Singh
- In office 2005–2009
- Succeeded by: Chandra Shekhar Dubey

Minister for Health, Medical Education & Family Welfare
- In office 2014–2019

Personal details
- Party: Bharatiya Janata Party
- Parent: Sahdev Chandravanshi (father)
- Education: I.SC, GLA COLLEGE, Daltonganj
- Occupation: Politician
- As of 25 October 2019

Ramchandra Chandravanshi is a former state legislative assembly member from Bishrampur. In the 2014 Jharkhand Legislative Assembly election, he was elected as MLA of Bishrampur as Bharatiya Janata Party candidate. He was also re-elected in 2019 Jharkhand Legislative Assembly election. In 2024 Jharkhand Legislative Assembly election he lost the seat to Naresh Prasad Singh of Rashtriya Janata Dal. He also held the position as health minister in the Government of Jharkhand. He was MLA of Bishrampur representing Rashtriya Janata Dal party from 2005 to 2009.
