= Naresh Prasad Singh =

Indian politician (born 1963)

Member of the Jharkhand Legislative Assembly
- Incumbent
- Assumed office 2024
- Preceded by: Ramchandra Chandravanshi
- Constituency: Bishrampur
- Majority: 14,587

Personal details
- Born: 1963 (age 62–63) India
- Education: G. L. A. College, Daltonganj
- Occupation: Politician

Naresh Prasad Singh

Member of the Jharkhand Legislative Assembly

Naresh Prasad Singh (born 1963) is an Indian politician from Jharkhand. He is an MLA from Bishrampur Assembly constituency in Palamu District. He won the 2024 Jharkhand Legislative Assembly election, representing the Rashtriya Janata Dal.

== Early life and education ==
Singh is from Bishrampur, Palamu District, Jharkhand. He is the son of Doman Singh. He passed Class 12 in 1978 at G. L. A. College, Daltonganj, Palamu.

== Career ==
Singh won from Bishrampur Assembly constituency representing Rashtriya Janata Dal in the 2024 Jharkhand Legislative Assembly election. He polled votes and defeated his nearest rival, Ramchandra Chandravanshi of the Bharatiya Janata Party, by a margin of 14,587 votes. Earlier, he lost the 2019 Jharkhand Legislative Assembly election finishing third behind Chandravanshi of the Bharatiya Janata Dal and Rajesh Mehta of the Bahujan Samaj Party.
