= Biranchi Narayan =

Indian politician

Biranchi Narayan (born 1971) is an Indian politician from Jharkhand. He is a two time MLA from Bokaro Assembly constituency in Bokaro district. He won the 2019 Jharkhand Legislative Assembly election, representing the Bharatiya Janata Party. He is nominated again to contest from Bokaro Assembly seat by BJP.

== Early life and education ==
Narayan is from Bokaro, Jharkhand. He is son of Sadanand Prasad. He completed his Post Graduate Diploma in Hindi Journalism in 1997 at Delhi University.

== Career ==
Narayan won from Bokaro Assembly constituency representing the Bharatiya Janata Party in the 2019 Jharkhand Legislative Assembly election, He polled 112,333 and defeated his nearest rival, Shweta Singh of the Indian National Congress, by a margin of 13,313 votes. He first became an MLA winning the 2014 Jharkhand Legislative Assembly election, defeating Samresh Singh, an independent candidate, by a huge margin of 72,643 votes.
