= Randhir Prasad Verma =

Indian Police Service officer (1952–1991)

Randhir Prasad Verma AC
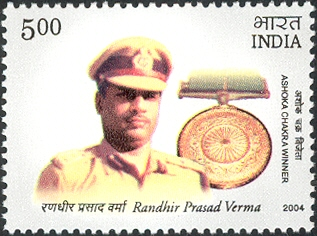
- Verma on a 2004 commemorative postage stamp
- Born: 1952
- Died: 3 January 1991 (aged 38–39)
- Police career
- Allegiance: India
- Branch: Indian Police Service
- Rank: Superintendent of Police
- Awards: Ashoka Chakra

Randhir Prasad Verma (1952 – 3 January 1991) was an Indian Police Service (IPS) officer who served as Superintendent of Police in Dhanbad, Bihar (now Jharkhand). He died while confronting armed individuals during an attempted bank robbery at a branch of the Bank of India in Dhanbad. He was posthumously awarded the Ashoka Chakra, India's highest peacetime gallantry award. In 2004, the Government of India issued a commemorative postage stamp featuring him.

== Early life and education ==
Randhir Prasad Verma was born in 1952 in Jagatpur, Supaul district, Bihar, into a Kayastha family. He completed his graduation at Patna University.

== Police career ==
Verma served in the Indian Police Service and was posted as Superintendent of Police in Dhanbad.

On 3 January 1991, he confronted a group of armed individuals carrying AK-47 rifles during an attempted robbery at a Bank of India branch in Dhanbad. According to accounts of the incident, Verma killed two of the attackers before being fatally shot.

== Awards and recognition ==
Verma was posthumously awarded the Ashoka Chakra for his actions during the bank robbery incident.

In 2004, the Government of India issued a commemorative postage stamp in his honour.
