= A. K. Roy =

Indian politician (1935–2019)

Arun Kumar Roy MP
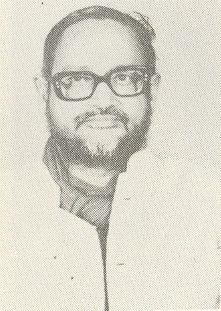

Member of Parliament – Lok Sabha
- In office 25 March 1977 – 31 December 1984
- Preceded by: Shankar Dayal Singh
- Succeeded by: Shankar Dayal Singh
- Constituency: Dhanbad, Bihar
- In office 1 December 1989 – 21 June 1991
- Preceded by: Shankar Dayal Singh
- Succeeded by: Rita Verma
- Constituency: Dhanbad, Bihar

Personal details
- Born: 15 June 1935 Rajshahi, Bengal, British India
- Died: 21 July 2019 (aged 84) Dhanbad, Jharkhand, India
- Party: Marxist Co-ordination Committee (1971–2019)
- Other political affiliations: Communist Party of India (Marxist) (1966–1971)
- Education: University of Calcutta
- Occupation: Educator, journalist, social worker

Arun Kumar Roy (15 June 1935 – 21 July 2019) was an Indian politician, who served both as a Member of Parliament and a Member of Legislative Assembly. He was born in a small village in Rajshahi district of the then East Bengal, during the British Raj to anti-British activist parents. Roy, a former member of the Communist Party of India (Marxist), entered politics after being dismissed from his job as chemical engineer in a company for supporting a workers' strike in 1966–1967.

Later in his political career, Roy founded the Marxist Co-ordination Committee, a political party based in the coal mining region of Dhanbad, Jharkhand.

== Early life ==
Arun Kumar Roy was born in Sapura village of Rajshahi district of the then East Bengal to Shibesh Chandra Roy and Renuka Roy. His father was an advocate by profession who had his legal practice in Rajshahi Court, but later shifted to Dinajpur in 1960 and started practising in Raiganj Court. His father died in 1967 in the court premises after suffering a blackout. Roy's parents were both anti-British activists also had served time in prison for participation in freedom movement.

Roy completed his primary education from a local school at Naogaon, Rajshahi in 1951 and later went to Belur Ramakrishna Mission School, from where he completed his secondary education. He graduated in Science from Surendranath College, Kolkata, and later gained a master's degree in 1959 in Chemical Engineering from the Calcutta University. Roy started his vocation in an industrial house of Kolkata. After serving there for two years he joined as Research Engineer, and worked under a scientist Dr Kshitish Ranjan Chakraborty in the newly established Projects and Development India Limited at Sindri, Dhanbad.

== Career ==
Roy served three terms as a Member of Parliament from Jharkhand.

== Personal life ==
Roy never got married and resided alone in Nunudih village in Dhanbad, in the care of local people over there who respected him. Ranguni was another village, that was close to his heart. During his peak days, Madhu Sudan Dutta from Ranguni worked closely with him to drive development in Ranguni.

He died on 21 July 2019 at a hospital in Dhanbad, at age 84.

== List of publications (in Hindi) ==
- Azadi ki ladai ab majdoor varg ko hi ladni hai (‘Now the working class must engage in the war for freedom’)
- Nai Janakranti (‘New People’s Revolution’)
- Manmohan Singh ke Bharat me Bhagat Singh ki khoj (‘In Search of Bhagat Singh in Manmohan Singh’s India’)
- Dharma aur Rajniti (‘Religion and politics’)
- Sampradayikata, Kshetriyata, Algavvad ki samasya par ek Marxvadi Vivechan (‘A Marxist analysis of problems of communalism, regionalism, and separatism’)
- New Dalit Revolution: A draft for debate
