= Raj Sinha =

Indian politician

Member of the Jharkhand Legislative Assembly
- Incumbent
- Assumed office 2014
- Constituency: Dhanbad

Personal details
- Born: 1962 Dhanbad, Dhanbad district, Jharkhand, India
- Party: Bharatiya Janata Party
- Parent: Pradhan Siddhanth Prasad (father)
- Education: M.A. (History)
- Alma mater: Patna University
- Occupation: Politician, Businessman

Raj Sinha (born 1962) is an Indian politician from Jharkhand. He is a member of the Bharatiya Janata Party. He is a member of the Jharkhand Legislative Assembly from the Dhanbad constituency in Dhanbad district, Jharkhand. He won the 2014 Jharkhand Legislative Assembly election, 2019 Jharkhand Legislative Assembly election and 2024 Jharkhand Legislative Assembly election.

== Early life and education ==
Sinha is from Dhanbad. His father is Pradhan Siddhanth Prasad. He is a businessman and his wife is a homemaker. He completed his post graduation arts, doing his M.A. in History at Patna University in 1985.

== Career ==
Sinha won the 2019 Jharkhand Legislative Assembly election. He was re-elected in 2024 Jharkhand Legislative Assembly election.
