= Umakant Rajak =

Indian politician

Member of the Jharkhand Legislative Assembly

Umakant Rajak is an Indian politician and member of the All Jharkhand Students Union. Umakant Rajak is a member of the Jharkhand Legislative Assembly from the Chandankiyari constituency in Bokaro district.
