= Jharkhand Vananchal Congress =

Political party in India

Jharkhand Vananchal Congress, a political party in Jharkhand, India. The party is led by Samresh Singh. The JVC has been merged into Bahujan Samaj Party. The political parties inactive were warned by the Election Commission of India that they may be unregistered. Unrecognised parties can still participate in the elections but will not get a dedicated symbol.
