= Pashupati Nath Singh =

Indian politician

Member of the India Parliament for Dhanbad
- In office 2009–2024
- Constituency: Dhanbad

Member of Legislative Assembly for Dhanbad
- In office 1995–2009

Personal details
- Born: 11 July 1949 (age 76) Lakhanpar, Patna, Bihar
- Party: Bharatiya Janata Party
- Spouse: Smt. Mira Singh
- Children: 3
- Occupation: Businessperson

Pashupati Nath Singh (born 11 July 1949; Hindi pronunciation: [pəʃʊpət̪ɪ n̪aːt̪ʰ sɪŋgʱ]) is an Indian politician belonging to Bharatiya Janata Party. He was a member of the Indian Parliament, and represented Dhanbad (Lok Sabha constituency) from 2009 to 2024.
