= Samresh Singh =

Indian politician (1940/1941 – 2022)

Samresh Singh (1940/1941 – 1 December 2022) was an Indian politician from the state of Jharkhand. He was the Vice President of Jharkhand Vikas Morcha (Prajatantrik). He was a member of the Jharkhand Legislative Assembly representing the Bokaro constituency. He was the first Science and Technology Minister of Jharkhand State Government. He was prominent leader of Vanachal state movement and demanded statehood for south Bihar.

Singh died on 1 December 2022, at the age of 81.
