= 1980 Bihar Legislative Assembly election =

Election in India

1980 Bihar legislative assembly election
- 31 May 1980

324 seats to the Bihar Legislative Assembly 163 seats needed for a majority
	Majority party	Minority party
	INC	JP(S)
Leader	Jagannath Mishra	Ram Sundar Das
Party	INC	Janata Party (Secular)
Seats won	169	46
Popular vote	7,690,225	3,515,684
Percentage	34.20%	15.63%
Chief Minister before election
President's rule
Elected Chief Minister
Jagannath Mishra
INC

Legislative Assembly elections were held in 1980, to elect members to the Bihar Legislative Assembly. After the elections, the Congress emerged as the largest party, and Jagannath Mishra was sworn in as the Chief Minister of Bihar. Later, Chandrashekhar Singh became the Chief Minister from 14 August 1983 to 12 March 1985.

The elections were held after President Neelam Sanjiva Reddy ordered the imposition of President's rule in the state on the advice of the Fourth Indira Gandhi ministry, which acted on basis that the victory of the Indian National Congress in the 1980 Indian general election proved that the government no longer reflected the will of the pepule.

== Voter Statistics ==
#	Constituency	Electors	Voters	Valid votes	Poll %
1	Dhanaha	94,219	41,408	40,617	43.95%
2	Bagha (SC)	1,29,916	55,657	54,672	42.84%
3	Ramnagar	1,14,898	51,332	50,525	44.68%
4	Shikarpur (SC)	1,17,497	57,622	56,949	49.04%
5	Sikta	1,11,729	68,964	68,094	61.72%
6	Lauria	1,09,907	56,241	55,487	51.17%
7	Chanpatia	1,07,341	48,082	47,448	44.79%
8	Bettiah	1,35,666	73,877	72,549	54.46%
9	Nautan	1,07,224	52,146	51,003	48.63%
10	Raxaul	1,10,538	63,005	62,345	57.00%
11	Sugauli	1,18,467	72,208	71,454	60.95%
12	Motihari	1,37,112	71,439	70,474	52.10%
13	Adapur	1,28,345	66,705	66,054	51.97%
14	Dhaka	1,41,759	97,652	96,904	68.89%
15	Ghorasahan	1,21,713	76,750	75,976	63.06%
16	Madhuban	1,26,784	83,947	83,058	66.21%
17	Pipra (SC)	1,05,363	49,556	48,985	47.03%
18	Kesariya	1,21,648	77,172	76,077	63.44%
19	Harsidhi	1,08,765	64,652	63,860	59.44%
20	Gobindganj	1,27,841	72,514	71,938	56.72%
21	Kateya	1,23,242	81,433	80,706	66.08%
22	Bhore (SC)	1,28,983	61,758	61,115	47.88%
23	Mirganj	1,21,111	74,064	73,166	61.15%
24	Gopalganj	1,23,028	76,882	76,331	62.49%
25	Barauli	1,18,918	59,760	59,300	50.25%
26	Baikunthpur	1,20,200	69,514	66,729	57.83%
27	Basantpur	1,36,316	90,156	88,845	66.14%
28	Goreakothi	1,19,970	70,833	70,013	59.04%
29	Siwan	1,27,095	76,458	75,831	60.16%
30	Mairwa (SC)	1,11,745	49,990	49,491	44.74%
31	Darauli	1,16,125	64,236	62,855	55.32%
32	Ziradei	1,11,895	65,861	65,069	58.86%
33	Maharajganj	1,24,595	74,642	73,921	59.91%
34	Raghunathpur	1,34,030	65,418	64,717	48.81%
35	Manjhi	1,26,842	70,936	69,621	55.92%
36	Baniapur	1,17,346	57,502	56,908	49.00%
37	Masrakh	1,27,619	66,740	66,076	52.30%
38	Taraiya	1,16,595	60,419	59,630	51.82%
39	Marhaura	1,23,505	84,193	83,502	68.17%
40	Jalalpur	1,34,041	67,001	66,262	49.99%
41	Chapra	1,49,699	81,514	80,750	54.45%
42	Garkha (SC)	1,19,502	54,404	53,638	45.53%
43	Parsa	1,28,132	81,223	80,582	63.39%
44	Sonepur	1,26,495	94,380	93,489	74.61%
45	Hajipur	1,27,334	79,148	78,140	62.16%
46	Raghopur	1,35,436	95,421	94,612	70.45%
47	Mahnar	1,33,913	93,487	92,576	69.81%
48	Jandaha	1,32,905	98,195	97,496	73.88%
49	Patepur (SC)	1,15,352	63,031	62,510	54.64%
50	Mahua (SC)	1,18,507	77,652	76,995	65.53%
51	Lalganj	1,17,353	75,358	74,695	64.21%
52	Vaishali	1,25,528	87,619	87,158	69.80%
53	Paru	1,33,397	83,109	82,381	62.30%
54	Sahebganj	1,27,390	81,557	80,774	64.02%
55	Baruraj	1,31,611	87,170	86,510	66.23%
56	Kanti	1,12,654	61,208	60,244	54.33%
57	Kurhani	1,21,415	83,693	83,158	68.93%
58	Sakra (SC)	1,13,532	65,585	65,008	57.77%
59	Muzaffarpur	1,53,675	1,03,141	1,02,463	67.12%
60	Bochaha (SC)	1,21,133	58,599	57,950	48.38%
61	Gaighatti	1,27,640	78,989	78,072	61.88%
62	Aurai	1,25,862	91,722	90,922	72.88%
63	Minapur	1,18,767	79,302	78,676	66.77%
64	Runisaidpur	1,39,903	88,279	87,513	63.10%
65	Belsand	1,18,293	71,771	71,145	60.67%
66	Sheohar	1,39,092	1,02,914	1,01,920	73.99%
67	Sitamurhi	1,43,955	82,911	82,151	57.60%
68	Bathnaha	1,46,441	99,496	98,565	67.94%
69	Majorganj (SC)	1,22,267	72,660	72,316	59.43%
70	Sonbarsa	1,26,955	90,459	89,741	71.25%
71	Sursand	1,26,973	78,643	78,019	61.94%
72	Pupri	1,40,447	85,793	84,995	61.09%
73	Benipatti	1,24,342	80,738	79,562	64.93%
74	Bisfi	1,41,862	1,02,240	1,01,327	72.07%
75	Harlakhi	1,19,938	76,125	74,843	63.47%
76	Khajauli (SC)	1,23,810	73,602	72,607	59.45%
77	Babubarhi	1,07,964	80,600	79,801	74.65%
78	Madhubani	1,38,772	78,781	77,068	56.77%
79	Pandaul	1,32,435	91,171	90,416	68.84%
80	Jhanjharpur	1,12,666	96,031	95,379	85.24%
81	Phulparas	1,19,043	96,224	94,854	80.83%
82	Laukaha	1,09,818	88,456	87,585	80.55%
83	Madhepur	1,20,357	1,02,400	1,01,699	85.08%
84	Manigachhi	1,15,028	88,121	87,760	76.61%
85	Bahera	1,23,014	1,06,155	1,05,617	86.30%
86	Ghanshyampur	1,36,291	1,14,400	1,13,925	83.94%
87	Baheri	1,33,590	1,00,502	99,976	75.23%
88	Darbhanga Rural (SC)	1,11,457	76,196	75,686	68.36%
89	Darbhanga	1,22,891	71,009	70,420	57.78%
90	Keoti	1,41,740	96,604	95,840	68.16%
91	Jale	1,25,912	75,013	73,766	59.58%
92	Hayaghat	1,12,410	80,244	79,605	71.39%
93	Kalyanpur	1,33,429	87,640	86,579	65.68%
94	Warisnagar (SC)	1,13,191	64,878	64,222	57.32%
95	Samastipur	1,43,017	87,271	86,618	61.02%
96	Sarairanjan	1,39,185	85,061	84,500	61.11%
97	Mohiuddin Nagar	1,46,962	1,16,416	1,15,472	79.22%
98	Dalsinghsarai	1,39,328	74,354	73,366	53.37%
99	Bibhutpur	1,48,442	78,745	77,922	53.05%
100	Rosera	1,22,461	93,349	92,838	76.23%
101	Singhia (SC)	1,22,823	71,617	70,689	58.31%
102	Hasanpur	1,15,273	72,410	71,502	62.82%
103	Balia	1,26,140	79,783	79,050	63.25%
104	Matihani	1,17,221	66,585	65,777	56.80%
105	Begusarai	1,20,244	69,602	68,433	57.88%
106	Barauni	1,37,648	82,724	81,164	60.10%
107	Bachwara	1,23,451	76,430	75,236	61.91%
108	Cheria Bariarpur	1,15,346	62,458	61,344	54.15%
109	Bakhri (SC)	1,07,259	59,000	57,841	55.01%
110	Raghopur	1,32,840	87,063	85,823	65.54%
111	Kishanpur	1,21,992	75,284	74,287	61.71%
112	Supaul	1,43,130	96,994	96,207	67.77%
113	Tribeniganj	1,15,682	89,365	88,480	77.25%
114	Chhatapur (SC)	1,13,294	73,663	72,783	65.02%
115	Kumarkhand (SC)	1,19,949	63,036	62,351	52.55%
116	Singheshwar	1,21,121	76,368	75,348	63.05%
117	Saharsa	1,30,590	95,971	95,185	73.49%
118	Mahishi	1,32,229	91,880	91,090	69.49%
119	Simiri-Bakhtiarpur	1,36,391	1,16,637	1,15,861	85.52%
120	Madhepura	1,28,459	75,237	74,605	58.57%
121	Sonbarsa	1,37,605	1,00,617	99,694	73.12%
122	Kishanganj	1,22,620	72,749	71,908	59.33%
123	Alamnagar	1,18,115	79,867	78,515	67.62%
124	Rupauli	1,07,113	69,380	68,026	64.77%
125	Dhamdaha	1,19,605	69,019	67,712	57.71%
126	Banmankhi (SC)	1,25,112	57,495	56,601	45.95%
127	Raniganj (SC)	1,19,219	55,305	54,540	46.39%
128	Narpatganj	1,27,910	72,066	71,039	56.34%
129	Forbesganj	1,17,233	71,297	70,156	60.82%
130	Araria	1,09,311	72,720	71,650	66.53%
131	Sikti	1,35,272	82,267	81,138	60.82%
132	Jokihat	1,05,059	59,525	58,536	56.66%
133	Bahadurganj	1,09,083	58,572	57,913	53.69%
134	Thakurganj	1,22,821	60,674	59,868	49.40%
135	Kishanganj	1,23,736	70,286	69,487	56.80%
136	Amour	1,04,252	62,916	61,815	60.35%
137	Baisi	95,127	54,351	53,584	57.14%
138	Kasba	1,24,688	74,437	73,178	59.70%
139	Purnea	1,12,675	62,333	61,082	55.32%
140	Korha (SC)	1,00,756	40,749	40,063	40.44%
141	Barari	96,894	57,959	56,572	59.82%
142	Katihar	1,20,150	64,569	63,693	53.74%
143	Kadwa	99,730	63,824	62,922	64.00%
144	Barsoi	1,01,204	56,993	56,269	56.31%
145	Pranpur	90,914	50,058	49,330	55.06%
146	Manihari	84,086	51,937	51,088	61.77%
147	Rajmahal	1,19,939	67,210	65,990	56.04%
148	Borio (ST)	1,12,352	34,264	33,613	30.50%
149	Barhait (ST)	56,725	43,329	42,277	76.38%
150	Litipara (ST)	93,052	40,254	39,243	43.26%
151	Pakaur	1,00,378	55,227	54,203	55.02%
152	Maheshpur (ST)	99,110	44,666	43,801	45.07%
153	Sikaripara (ST)	1,09,232	47,126	46,194	43.14%
154	Nala	1,13,064	54,454	53,325	48.16%
155	Jamtara	1,01,420	48,546	47,610	47.87%
156	Sarath	1,11,192	67,153	66,063	60.39%
157	Madhupur	1,19,629	60,491	59,478	50.57%
158	Deoghar (SC)	1,27,015	48,267	47,600	38.00%
159	Jarmundi	98,517	53,563	52,365	54.37%
160	Dumka (ST)	1,09,942	45,445	44,574	41.34%
161	Jama (ST)	1,00,548	36,114	35,163	35.92%
162	Poreyahat	1,26,456	61,285	59,677	48.46%
163	Godda	1,28,815	95,120	93,619	73.84%
164	Mahagama	1,29,951	77,799	76,323	59.87%
165	Pirpainti	1,24,820	80,457	79,298	64.46%
166	Colgong	1,34,469	89,329	88,136	66.43%
167	Nathnagar	1,26,948	77,472	76,340	61.03%
168	Bhagalpur	1,22,556	60,744	59,907	49.56%
169	Gopalpur	1,19,039	72,378	71,055	60.80%
170	Bihpur	1,16,637	71,860	70,969	61.61%
171	Sultanganj (SC)	1,36,733	71,926	70,879	52.60%
172	Amarpur	1,26,549	81,277	79,888	64.23%
173	Dhuraiya (SC)	1,22,254	74,001	72,847	60.53%
174	Banka	1,09,220	60,049	58,385	54.98%
175	Belhar	1,08,001	61,666	59,704	57.10%
176	Katoria	1,21,086	64,262	62,988	53.07%
177	Chakai	1,15,287	68,455	67,519	59.38%
178	Jhajha	1,00,600	53,672	52,840	53.35%
179	Tarapur	1,14,307	81,036	79,988	70.89%
180	Kharagpur	1,31,487	78,785	77,515	59.92%
181	Parbatta	1,34,953	91,139	90,197	67.53%
182	Chautham	1,26,860	84,033	82,780	66.24%
183	Khagaria	1,19,327	80,101	79,273	67.13%
184	Alauli (SC)	1,07,749	59,718	58,610	55.42%
185	Monghyr	1,50,497	95,888	95,120	63.71%
186	Jamalpur	1,33,256	77,017	75,698	57.80%
187	Surajgarha	1,42,010	1,07,828	1,06,130	75.93%
188	Jamui	1,36,453	93,707	92,795	68.67%
189	Sikandra (SC)	1,28,229	87,392	85,847	68.15%
190	Lakhisarai	1,78,777	98,006	95,818	54.82%
191	Sheikhpura	1,37,175	1,13,187	1,11,028	82.51%
192	Barbigha (SC)	1,21,632	84,030	82,938	69.09%
193	Asthawan	1,25,054	96,155	95,199	76.89%
194	Bihar	1,58,313	97,707	96,691	61.72%
195	Rajgir (SC)	1,30,185	79,044	78,176	60.72%
196	Nalanda	1,31,565	1,00,321	99,475	76.25%
197	Islampur	1,38,824	1,08,613	1,06,562	78.24%
198	Hilsa	1,38,549	98,992	98,081	71.45%
199	Chandi	1,17,550	80,595	79,937	68.56%
200	Harnaut	1,17,992	78,181	77,295	66.26%
201	Mokamah	1,41,239	87,614	86,391	62.03%
202	Barh	1,37,563	1,00,216	99,118	72.85%
203	Bakhtiarpur	1,33,878	1,14,687	1,13,994	85.67%
204	Fatwa (SC)	1,34,980	65,950	65,189	48.86%
205	Masaurhi	1,52,746	1,14,692	1,12,957	75.09%
206	Patna West	2,08,942	88,981	88,106	42.59%
207	Patna Central	1,57,857	70,367	69,408	44.58%
208	Patna East	1,32,371	67,644	66,879	51.10%
209	Danapur	1,20,038	69,001	67,933	57.48%
210	Maner	1,28,989	86,740	85,907	67.25%
211	Phulwari (SC)	1,38,125	79,533	78,613	57.58%
212	Bikram	1,26,268	89,681	88,758	71.02%
213	Paliganj	1,47,797	1,20,564	1,19,682	81.57%
214	Sandesh	1,33,841	60,375	58,876	45.11%
215	Barhara	1,43,831	72,360	71,604	50.31%
216	Arrah	1,44,909	68,308	67,732	47.14%
217	Shahpur	1,26,871	57,103	56,444	45.01%
218	Brahmpur	1,59,006	78,428	77,533	49.32%
219	Buxar	1,17,377	59,217	58,173	50.45%
220	Rajpur (SC)	1,15,786	52,447	51,832	45.30%
221	Dumraon	1,38,976	72,712	71,789	52.32%
222	Jagdishpur	1,64,900	75,237	73,985	45.63%
223	Piro	1,40,537	79,969	79,147	56.90%
224	Sahar (SC)	1,31,559	56,913	56,423	43.26%
225	Karakat	1,37,616	93,491	92,563	67.94%
226	Bikramganj	1,39,032	85,675	84,933	61.62%
227	Dinara	1,21,231	86,419	85,950	71.28%
228	Ramgarh	1,16,710	65,127	63,991	55.80%
229	Mohania (SC)	1,22,316	53,400	52,705	43.66%
230	Bhabhua	1,35,130	80,245	78,552	59.38%
231	Chainpur	1,06,735	59,549	58,151	55.79%
232	Sasaram	1,39,006	75,299	73,928	54.17%
233	Chenari (SC)	1,31,737	75,429	74,731	57.26%
234	Nokha	1,16,705	79,048	78,432	67.73%
235	Dehri	1,33,995	71,275	70,081	53.19%
236	Nabinagar	1,25,542	75,443	73,968	60.09%
237	Deo (SC)	1,19,569	57,818	56,903	48.36%
238	Aurangabad	1,24,791	76,324	74,561	61.16%
239	Rafiganj	1,16,668	72,288	71,213	61.96%
240	Obra	1,44,459	95,755	94,710	66.29%
241	Goh	1,27,923	85,095	83,884	66.52%
242	Arwal	1,45,477	98,635	97,493	67.80%
243	Kurtha	1,39,579	1,01,417	1,00,576	72.66%
244	Makhdumpur	1,43,085	1,06,001	1,05,462	74.08%
245	Jahanabad	1,46,224	1,15,506	1,14,360	78.99%
246	Ghosi	1,38,555	1,16,006	1,14,732	83.73%
247	Belaganj	1,26,919	96,164	94,296	75.77%
248	Konch	1,31,930	89,520	88,656	67.85%
249	Gaya Muffasil	1,41,036	95,602	93,224	67.79%
250	Gaya Town	1,30,691	67,165	65,694	51.39%
251	Imamganj (SC)	1,07,841	44,333	43,304	41.11%
252	Gurua	1,17,986	78,443	76,324	66.49%
253	Bodh Gaya (SC)	1,02,244	63,019	61,984	61.64%
254	Barachatti (SC)	1,13,689	57,846	56,462	50.88%
255	Fatehpur (SC)	1,24,507	63,436	62,206	50.95%
256	Atri	1,39,997	1,14,998	1,14,100	82.14%
257	Nawada	1,59,537	1,03,382	1,02,232	64.80%
258	Rajauli (SC)	1,41,226	79,100	78,249	56.01%
259	Gobindpur	1,44,151	91,230	90,340	63.29%
260	Warsaliganj	1,38,937	92,061	91,165	66.26%
261	Hisua	1,27,543	57,423	56,024	45.02%
262	Kodarma	1,12,366	58,032	56,984	51.65%
263	Barhi	93,172	41,503	40,433	44.54%
264	Chatra (SC)	1,22,206	37,081	36,405	30.34%
265	Simaria (SC)	1,12,632	34,119	33,416	30.29%
266	Barkagaon	1,36,506	62,022	60,863	45.44%
267	Ramgarh	1,12,495	59,275	58,071	52.69%
268	Mandu	1,36,848	53,473	52,406	39.07%
269	Hazaribagh	1,23,544	49,184	48,325	39.81%
270	Barkatha	1,16,255	58,823	57,397	50.60%
271	Dhanwar	1,14,962	54,656	53,352	47.54%
272	Bagodar	1,19,522	48,191	46,988	40.32%
273	Jamua (SC)	1,13,687	46,629	45,811	41.02%
274	Gandey	1,03,213	49,980	48,734	48.42%
275	Giridih	1,02,997	53,082	52,051	51.54%
276	Dumri	1,06,711	46,404	45,307	43.49%
277	Gomia	1,03,321	43,937	43,007	42.52%
278	Bermo	1,31,597	64,122	62,735	48.73%
279	Bokaro	1,76,208	96,273	94,928	54.64%
280	Tundo	1,10,936	57,285	56,109	51.64%
281	Baghmara	1,25,416	64,397	63,372	51.35%
282	Sindri	1,33,736	65,893	64,688	49.27%
283	Nirsa	1,31,830	59,724	58,636	45.30%
284	Dhanbad	1,53,940	70,114	69,081	45.55%
285	Jharia	1,46,745	69,026	68,036	47.04%
286	Chandankiyari (SC)	1,04,026	40,306	39,312	38.75%
287	Baharagora	1,10,702	63,393	61,969	57.26%
288	Ghatsila (ST)	1,06,994	33,322	32,536	31.14%
289	Potka (ST)	1,19,936	36,413	35,596	30.36%
290	Jugsalai (SC)	1,23,313	48,223	47,297	39.11%
291	Jamshedpur East	1,22,111	54,096	53,368	44.30%
292	Jamshedpur West	1,08,766	49,716	48,912	45.71%
293	Ichagarh	1,10,071	52,777	51,576	47.95%
294	Seraikella (ST)	1,15,441	31,876	31,358	27.61%
295	Chaibasa (ST)	98,702	30,016	28,936	30.41%
296	Majhgaon (ST)	92,634	23,299	22,355	25.15%
297	Jagannathpur (ST)	82,059	29,183	27,955	35.56%
298	Manoharpur (ST)	92,226	25,602	24,712	27.76%
299	Chakradharpur (ST)	90,646	37,371	36,514	41.23%
300	Kharswan (ST)	98,983	28,948	28,212	29.25%
301	Tamar (ST)	1,09,757	39,214	38,162	35.73%
302	Torpa (ST)	90,063	14,674	14,191	16.29%
303	Khunti (ST)	92,323	21,366	20,835	23.14%
304	Silli	1,03,104	52,747	51,461	51.16%
305	Khijri (ST)	1,25,846	47,884	46,297	38.05%
306	Ranchi	1,26,777	56,535	55,853	44.59%
307	Hatia	1,12,477	48,388	47,363	43.02%
308	Kanke (SC)	1,34,030	40,342	39,368	30.10%
309	Mandar (ST)	1,30,834	49,509	48,181	37.84%
310	Sisai (ST)	1,09,293	37,536	36,052	34.34%
311	Kolebira (ST)	97,787	23,141	22,442	23.66%
312	Simdega (ST)	1,05,964	29,951	28,996	28.27%
313	Gumla (ST)	1,01,140	37,310	36,333	36.89%
314	Bishnupur (ST)	1,12,994	33,114	32,198	29.31%
315	Lohardaga (ST)	1,04,594	36,988	36,188	35.36%
316	Latehar (SC)	91,173	25,909	25,420	28.42%
317	Manika (ST)	81,602	28,993	28,378	35.53%
318	Panki	1,00,677	43,977	42,933	43.68%
319	Daltonganj	1,22,562	55,389	54,080	45.19%
320	Garhwa	1,13,840	48,528	47,327	42.63%
321	Bhawanathpur	1,21,789	57,488	56,365	47.20%
322	Bishrampur	1,12,918	59,579	58,710	52.76%
323	Chhatarpur (SC)	96,630	35,843	35,091	37.09%
324	Hussainabad	1,06,678	51,635	50,894	48.40%

== Results ==
Party	Votes	%	Seats
Indian National Congress	7,690,225	34.20	169
Janata Party (Secular)	3,515,684	15.63	42
Communist Party of India	2,051,962	9.12	23
Bharatiya Janata Party	1,891,325	8.41	21
Indian National Congress (U)	1,649,695	7.34	14
Janata Party (JP)	1,620,754	7.21	13
Communist Party of India (Marxist)	394,013	1.75	6
Janata Party (Secular) Raj Narain	362,388	1.61	1
Jharkhand Mukti Morcha	380,891	1.69	11
Shoshit Samaj Dal (Akhil Bharatiya)	128,517	0.57	–
Socialist Unity Centre of India (Communist)	49,407	0.22	1
Jharkhand Party	31,952	0.14	–
Revolutionary Socialist Party	11,963	0.05	–
Lokdal	6,744	0.03	–
Janata Party	6,733	0.03	–
All India Forward Bloc	5,309	0.02	–
Bharatiya Socialist Party	1,102	0.00	–
Akhil Bharatiya Ram Rajya Parishad	729	0.00	–
Republican Party of India	568	0.00	–
Independent	2,688,947	11.96	23
Total	22,488,908	100.00	324
Valid votes	22,488,908	98.62	
Invalid/blank votes	315,496	1.38	
Total votes	22,804,404	100.00	
Registered voters/turnout	39,815,510	57.28	

NOTE:

- A total of 3,002 candidates contested the election, of whom 324 (10.79%) were elected, while 2,245 (74.78%) forfeited their deposits.
- The total number of votes polled was 22,488,908.
- Altogether, 19 political parties participated in the election, including 10 national parties, 2 state parties, and 7 registered unrecognised parties.
- Among the candidates, 1,347 were independents, of whom 23 were elected, while 1,278 (94.88%) forfeited their deposits.

== Elected members ==
Constituency		Winner				Runner Up				Margin	%
No.	Name (Note: SC and ST indicate constituencies reserved for Scheduled Castes and Scheduled Tribes respectively.)	Candidate	Party	Votes	%	Candidate	Party	Votes	%	Margin	%
1	Dhanaha	Hardeo Prasad	INC(I)	14,535	35.79	Rang Lall Prasad	JP(S)	7,818	19.25	6,717	16.54
2	Bagha (SC)	Triloki Harijan	INC(I)	32,516	59.47	Melaha Mehto	BJP	11,930	21.82	20,586	37.65
3	Ramnagar	Arjun Vikram Shah	INC(I)	32,514	64.35	Hari Shankar Tiwari	BJP	8,454	16.73	24,060	47.62
4	Shikarpur (SC)	Sita Ram Prasad	INC(I)	32,715	57.45	Narsingh Baitha	INC(U)	22,520	39.54	10,195	17.91
5	Sikta	Dharmesh Prasad Verma	JP	36,799	54.04	Faiyazul Azam	INC(I)	25,503	37.45	11,296	16.59
6	Lauria	Vishwamohan Sharma	INC(I)	31,344	56.49	Ajaj Ahmad	JP	13,861	24.98	17,483	31.51
7	Chanpatia	Virbal Sharma	CPI	22,989	48.45	Prabhat Kishore Dwivedi	INC(I)	16,821	35.45	6,168	13.00
8	Bettiah	Gauri Shankar Pandey	INC(I)	25,360	34.96	Sheo Shankar Kanodia	IND	16,404	22.61	8,956	12.35
9	Nautan	Kamla Devi	INC(I)	14,765	28.95	Rawakant Dwivedi	CPI	9,158	17.96	5,607	10.99
10	Raxaul	Sagir Ahmad	INC(I)	23,313	37.39	Radha Pandey	JP	11,816	18.95	11,497	18.44
11	Sugauli	Ramashray Singh	CPI(M)	29,395	41.14	Suresh Kumar Mishra	INC(I)	12,651	17.71	16,744	23.43
12	Motihari	Prabhawati Gupta	INC(I)	25,390	36.03	Triveni Tiwari	CPI	23,857	33.85	1,533	2.18
13	Adapur	Sharmim Udin Hasmi	JP(S)	22,693	34.36	Sajawal Rai	INC(I)	19,411	29.39	3,282	4.97
14	Dhaka	Motiur Rahman	INC(I)	42,572	43.93	Prem Shanker Kumar	IND	20,619	21.28	21,953	22.65
15	Ghorasahan	Rajendra Pratap Singh	INC(I)	28,456	37.45	Lal Baboo Prasad	INC(U)	21,392	28.16	7,064	9.29
16	Madhuban	Vraj Kishore Singh	INC(I)	48,722	58.66	Mahendra Rai	JP(S)	20,230	24.36	28,492	34.30
17	Pipra (SC)	Nand Lal Chaudhary	INC(I)	26,111	53.30	Tulsi Ram	CPI	11,577	23.63	14,534	29.67
18	Kesariya	Rai Harishankar Sharma	JP	23,604	31.03	Laxman Singh	INC(I)	21,720	28.55	1,884	2.48
19	Harsidhi	Md. Hadaytullah Khan	INC(I)	34,623	54.22	Durgadatt Prasad	CPI	23,538	36.86	11,085	17.36
20	Gobindganj	Ramashankar Pandey	INC(I)	34,103	47.41	Umakant Shukla	CPI(M)	30,328	42.16	3,775	5.25
21	Kateya	Sihaswar Sahi	INC(I)	36,335	45.02	Bacha Choubey	BJP	29,685	36.78	6,650	8.24
22	Bhore (SC)	Alagu Ram	INC(I)	28,273	46.26	Surendra Ram	JP	13,168	21.55	15,105	24.71
23	Mirganj	Raj Mangal Mishra	JP	31,168	42.60	Anant Prasad Singh	INC(I)	18,597	25.42	12,571	17.18
24	Gopalganj	Kali Prasad Pandey	IND	33,447	43.82	Jagat Narain Singh	INC(U)	19,852	26.01	13,595	17.81
25	Barauli	Abdul Ghafoor	INC(U)	24,084	40.61	Adnan Khan	INC(I)	10,023	16.90	14,061	23.71
26	Baikunthpur	Braj Kishore Narain Singh	JP	19,785	29.65	Dedoat Rai	JP(S)	13,067	19.58	6,718	10.07
27	Basantpur	Manik Chand Roy	JP(S)	47,159	53.08	Tarkeshwar Nath Singh	INC(I)	27,782	31.27	19,377	21.81
28	Goreakothi	Ajit Kumar Singh	INC(I)	38,282	54.68	Indradeo Prasad	BJP	19,219	27.45	19,063	27.23
29	Siwan	Janardan Tiwary	BJP	28,867	38.07	Awadh Bihar Choudhary	INC(U)	13,728	18.10	15,139	19.97
30	Mairwa (SC)	Ram Narain Ram	INC(I)	17,451	35.26	Girdhari Ram	CPI(M)	14,611	29.52	2,840	5.74
31	Darauli	Chandrika Pandey	INC(I)	19,388	30.85	Mrityunjay Prasad Singh	INC(U)	14,257	22.68	5,131	8.17
32	Ziradei	Raghav Prasad	JP(S)	14,147	21.74	Vipendra Kumar Verma	JP	11,469	17.63	2,678	4.11
33	Maharajganj	Umashankar Singh	JP	31,589	42.73	Anusuya Jayaswal	INC(I)	26,550	35.92	5,039	6.81
34	Raghunathpur	Vijay Shankar Dubey	INC(I)	34,413	53.17	Vikram Kumar	BJP	16,600	25.65	17,813	27.52
35	Manjhi	Rameshwar Dutta Sharma	INC(I)	33,448	48.04	Ram Bahadur Singh	JP	32,956	47.34	492	0.70
36	Baniapur	Uma Pandey	INC(I)	22,228	39.06	Rama Kant Pandey	BJP	16,916	29.73	5,312	9.33
37	Masrakh	Ram Deo Singh	INC(I)	29,927	45.29	Kashi Nath Rai	INC(U)	15,929	24.11	13,998	21.18
38	Taraiya	Prabhu Nath Singh	INC(I)	28,042	47.03	Ramdas Rai	BJP	19,879	33.34	8,163	13.69
39	Marhaura	Bhishma Prasad Yadav	INC(I)	37,207	44.56	Amar Kr. Pandey	IND	27,989	33.52	9,218	11.04
40	Jalalpur	Kumar Kalika Singh	INC(I)	24,326	36.71	Madhusudan Singh	BJP	13,879	20.95	10,447	15.76
41	Chapra	Janak Yadav	JP(S)	27,568	34.14	Mithilesh Kumar Singh	JP	21,838	27.04	5,730	7.10
42	Garkha (SC)	Raghu Nandan Manji	INC(I)	16,586	30.92	Amrit Choudhary	JP(S)	13,609	25.37	2,977	5.55
43	Parsa	Daroga Prasad Rai	INC(I)	55,594	68.99	Ram Nath Singh	CPI	14,302	17.75	41,292	51.24
44	Sonepur	Lalu Prasad	JP(S)	45,041	48.18	Jawahar Prasad Singh	INC(I)	35,874	38.37	9,167	9.81
45	Hajipur	Jagannath Pd. Rai	INC(I)	20,323	26.01	Baskit Rai	INC(U)	19,084	24.42	1,239	1.59
46	Raghopur	Udey Na. Rai	JP(S)	40,136	42.42	Ram Jaipal Singh Yadav	INC(I)	37,972	40.13	2,164	2.29
47	Mahnar	Munshilal Rai	JP(S)	45,557	49.21	Ram Prasad Singh	INC(I)	30,477	32.92	15,080	16.29
48	Jandaha	Birendra Singh	IND	28,572	29.31	Shib Prasad Singh	JP(S)	26,885	27.58	1,687	1.73
49	Patepur (SC)	Shiv Nandan Pawan	JP(S)	28,153	45.04	Baleshwar Singh	INC(I)	22,454	35.92	5,699	9.12
50	Mahua (SC)	Desai Chaudhary	JP(S)	43,387	56.35	Saryug Ram	INC(I)	31,748	41.23	11,639	15.12
51	Lalganj	Laliteshwar Prasad Shahi	INC(I)	41,098	55.02	Jay Narain Prasad Nisad	JP(S)	18,241	24.42	22,857	30.60
52	Vaishali	Brishna Patel	JP(S)	45,004	51.63	Yogendra Prasad Singh	IND	22,946	26.33	22,058	25.30
53	Paru	Nitishwar Prasad Singh	JP(SR) (Note: Janata Party (Secular Raj Narain))	31,288	37.98	Vaidehi Devi	INC(I)	29,397	35.68	1,891	2.30
54	Sahebganj	Nawal Kishore Singh	INC(U)	28,316	35.06	Bhagya Narain Rai	CPI(M)	23,686	29.32	4,630	5.74
55	Baruraj	Jamuna Singh	INC(I)	30,129	34.83	Shashi Kumar Rai	JP(S)	29,122	33.66	1,007	1.17
56	Kanti	Nailini Ranjan Singh	SUCI	26,705	44.33	Shambhu Sharan Thakur	INC(I)	15,998	26.56	10,707	17.77
57	Kurhani	Ram Praikshan Sah	JP(S)	32,184	38.70	Sadhu Sharan Sahi	JP	30,296	36.43	1,888	2.27
58	Sakra (SC)	Fakirchand Ram	INC(I)	37,464	57.63	Paltan Ram	JP(S)	24,384	37.51	13,080	20.12
59	Muzaffarpur	Raghunath Pandey	INC(I)	69,252	67.59	Ram Kirpal Singh	BJP	13,409	13.09	55,843	54.50
60	Bochaha (SC)	Ramai Ram	JP	17,663	30.48	Righan Ram	CPI	13,752	23.73	3,911	6.75
61	Gaighatti	Jitendra Prasad Singh	BJP	26,157	33.50	Vinodanand Singh	JP(S)	13,012	16.67	13,145	16.83
62	Aurai	Ganesh Prasad Yadav	JP(S)	46,783	51.45	Tribeni Prasad Singh	INC(I)	42,467	46.71	4,316	4.74
63	Minapur	Jankdhari Prasad Kushwaha	CPI	28,530	36.26	Mahendra Sahni	INC(I)	22,753	28.92	5,777	7.34
64	Runisaidpur	Vivekanand Giri	INC(I)	38,463	43.95	Nawal Kishore Shahi	JP	26,881	30.72	11,582	13.23
65	Belsand	Raghubans Prasad Singh	JP(S)	27,856	39.15	Ramanand Singh	INC(I)	26,293	36.96	1,563	2.19
66	Sheohar	Raghunath Jha	INC(I)	55,044	54.01	Jafir Alam	IND	46,542	45.67	8,502	8.34
67	Sitamurhi	Pir Mohammad Ansari	INC(I)	22,480	27.36	Ram Swartha Rai	JP(S)	19,775	24.07	2,705	3.29
68	Bathnaha	Suryadeo Rai	INC(U)	42,279	42.89	Captain Ramniwas	INC(I)	37,551	38.10	4,728	4.79
69	Majorganj (SC)	Ram Briksha Ram	INC(I)	46,605	64.45	Dinkar Ram	INC(U)	20,578	28.46	26,027	35.99
70	Sonbarsa	M. Anwarul Haque	INC(I)	32,498	36.21	Indal Singh	JP(S)	26,417	29.44	6,081	6.77
71	Sursand	Nagendra Prasad Yadav	INC(I)	29,736	38.11	Ramcharitra Rai Yadav	INC(U)	29,018	37.19	718	0.92
72	Pupri	Rambriksha Choudhary	INC(U)	44,460	52.31	Sudamam Devi	INC(I)	22,849	26.88	21,611	25.43
73	Benipatti	Yugeshwar Jha	INC(I)	29,186	36.68	Tejnarain Jha	CPI	24,646	30.98	4,540	5.70
74	Bisfi	Rajkumar Purbey	CPI	37,077	36.59	Aziz Noorudin	INC(I)	29,928	29.54	7,149	7.05
75	Harlakhi	Mithilesh Kumar Pandey	INC(I)	31,666	42.31	Baidyanath Yadav	CPI	31,528	42.13	138	0.18
76	Khajauli (SC)	Ram Lakhan Ram Raman	CPI	27,676	38.12	Bilat Paswan	INC(I)	24,246	33.39	3,430	4.73
77	Babubarhi	Mahendra Narain Jha	INC(I)	32,349	40.54	Deo Narain Yadav	JP	16,999	21.30	15,350	19.24
78	Madhubani	Raj Kumar Mahaseth	JP(S)	24,025	31.17	Padma Chaubey	INC(I)	21,198	27.51	2,827	3.66
79	Pandaul	Kumud Ranjan Jha	INC(I)	37,073	41.00	Vijay Kumar Mishra	JP	35,732	39.52	1,341	1.48
80	Jhanjharpur	Jagannath Mishra	INC(I)	70,773	74.20	Ram Deo Bhandari	JP(S)	21,584	22.63	49,189	51.57
81	Phulparas	Surendra Yadav	JP(S)	45,498	47.97	Kripa Nath Pathak	JP	31,773	33.50	13,725	14.47
82	Laukaha	Lal Bihari Yadav	CPI	29,850	34.08	Kuldeo Goit	INC(I)	19,984	22.82	9,866	11.26
83	Madhepur	Radhanandan Jha	INC(I)	62,424	61.38	Siya Ram Yadav	JP(S)	26,567	26.12	35,857	35.26
84	Manigachhi	Nagendra Jha	INC(I)	55,454	63.19	Indra Kant Jha	JP(S)	23,838	27.16	31,616	36.03
85	Bahera	Parma Nand Jha	INC(I)	57,657	54.59	Abdul Bari Siddique	JP(S)	37,235	35.25	20,422	19.34
86	Ghanshyampur	Mahendra Narain Jha	INC(I)	66,093	58.01	Mahabir Prasad	JP(S)	41,208	36.17	24,885	21.84
87	Baheri	Rama Kant Jha	INC(I)	49,502	49.51	Ram Lakhan Yadav	JP(S)	30,979	30.99	18,523	18.52
88	Darbhanga Rural (SC)	Jagdish Choudhary	JP(S)	41,290	54.55	Jagdish Paswan	INC(I)	26,439	34.93	14,851	19.62
89	Darbhanga	Abdul Sami Nadvi	INC(I)	28,844	40.96	Kameshwar Purbe	JP(S)	21,850	31.03	6,994	9.93
90	Keoti	Shamaole Nabi	INC(I)	35,423	36.96	Fuziur Rahman	JP(S)	27,155	28.33	8,268	8.63
91	Jale	Abdul Salam	CPI	24,317	32.97	Sushil Kumar Jha	INC(I)	18,341	24.86	5,976	8.11
92	Hayaghat	Madan Mohan Choudhary	INC(I)	26,173	32.88	Kafil Ahmad	JP(S)	24,829	31.19	1,344	1.69
93	Kalyanpur	Ram Sukumari Devi	INC(I)	40,446	46.72	Bashishtha Narain Singh	JP(S)	37,292	43.07	3,154	3.65
94	Warisnagar (SC)	Pitambar Paswan	JP(S)	26,512	41.28	Prameshwar Ram	INC(I)	23,223	36.16	3,289	5.12
95	Samastipur	Karpoori Thakur	JP(S)	51,117	59.01	Chandra Shekhar Verma	INC(I)	23,958	27.66	27,159	31.35
96	Sarairanjan	Ram Bilas Mishra	JP(S)	33,684	39.86	Suraj Choudhary	INC(I)	27,141	32.12	6,543	7.74
97	Mohiuddin Nagar	Ram Chandra Rai	INC(U)	58,274	50.47	Anugrah Narain Singh	INC(I)	52,930	45.84	5,344	4.63
98	Dalsinghsarai	Jagdish Prasad Choudhary	INC(I)	23,745	32.37	Rampadarath Mahto	JP(S)	22,040	30.04	1,705	2.33
99	Bibhutpur	Ramdeo Verma	CPI(M)	26,308	33.76	Bandhu Mahto	INC(I)	20,612	26.45	5,696	7.31
100	Rosera	Ramashary Rai	INC(I)	62,806	67.65	Ramlakhan Singh	JP(S)	28,204	30.38	34,602	37.27
101	Singhia (SC)	Ramjatan Paswan	CPI	25,487	36.06	Jagdish Paswan	IND	22,433	31.73	3,054	4.33
102	Hasanpur	Gajendra Prasad Himansu	JP(S)	27,295	38.17	Prayag Chand Mukhia	CPI	24,264	33.93	3,031	4.24
103	Balia	Srinarhyan Yadav	JP(S)	34,247	43.32	Chandrabhanu Devi	INC(I)	27,325	34.57	6,922	8.75
104	Matihani	Pramod Kumar Sharma	INC(I)	37,069	56.36	Devkinandan Singh	CPI	23,796	36.18	13,273	20.18
105	Begusarai	Bhola Singh	INC(I)	30,221	44.16	Basudeo Singh	CPI(M)	24,722	36.13	5,499	8.03
106	Barauni	Rameshwar Singh	CPI	42,700	52.61	Sidheshwar Prasad Singh	INC(I)	36,268	44.68	6,432	7.93
107	Bachwara	Ramdeo Roy	INC(I)	31,212	41.49	Ayodheya Prasad Singh	CPI	27,982	37.19	3,230	4.30
108	Cheria Bariarpur	Sukhdeo Mahto	CPI	23,293	37.97	Harihar Mahto	INC(I)	22,167	36.14	1,126	1.83
109	Bakhri (SC)	Ramchandra Paswan	CPI	25,012	43.24	Yugal Kishore Sharma	INC(I)	18,680	32.30	6,332	10.94
110	Raghopur	Amrendra Mishra	INC(I)	43,823	51.06	Kumar Shashindra Singh	IND	18,276	21.29	25,547	29.77
111	Kishanpur	Vishwanath Gurmaita	INC(I)	17,952	24.17	Yadubans Kumar Yadav	JP(S)	17,643	23.75	309	0.42
112	Supaul	Uma Shankar Singh	INC(I)	37,117	38.58	Ramjee Mandal Shastri	JP(S)	36,814	38.27	303	0.31
113	Tribeniganj	Jagdish Mandal	INC(I)	40,715	46.02	Anup Lal Yadav	JP(S)	40,213	45.45	502	0.57
114	Chhatapur (SC)	Kumbh Narin Sardar	INC(I)	37,243	51.17	Sitaram Paswan	JP(S)	20,389	28.01	16,854	23.16
115	Kumarkhand (SC)	Nawal Kishore Bharti	JP(S)	30,894	49.55	Jaikrishna Hazara	INC(I)	16,600	26.62	14,294	22.93
116	Singheshwar	Jai Kumar Singh	JP(S)	30,352	40.28	Ram Krishna Yadav	INC(I)	22,135	29.38	8,217	10.90
117	Saharsa	Ramesh Jha	INC(I)	63,580	66.80	Janardan Pandey	CPI	10,025	10.53	53,555	56.27
118	Mahishi	Lahtan Chaudhry	INC(I)	46,431	50.97	Satya Na. Yadav	INC(U)	19,828	21.77	26,603	29.20
119	Simiri-Bakhtiarpur	Chaudhry Md. Salahuadin	INC(I)	58,361	50.37	Dinesh Chandra Yadav	JP(S)	53,397	46.09	4,964	4.28
120	Madhepura	Radha Kant Yadav	JP(S)	24,102	32.31	Manindra Kumar Yadav	INC(I)	13,972	18.73	10,130	13.58
121	Sonbarsa	Surya Na. Yadav	INC(U)	35,830	35.94	K. K. Mandal	INC(I)	27,787	27.87	8,043	8.07
122	Kishanganj	Singheshwar Mehta	INC(I)	22,986	31.97	Raj Nandan Prasad	JP(S)	21,362	29.71	1,624	2.26
123	Alamnagar	Birendra Kumar	JP(S)	33,419	42.56	Vidyakar Kavi	INC(I)	25,816	32.88	7,603	9.68
124	Rupauli	Dinesh Kumar Singh	INC(I)	24,409	35.88	Saryug Pd. Mandal	CPI	22,433	32.98	1,976	2.90
125	Dhamdaha	Surja Narayan Singh Yadav	JP(S)	25,205	37.22	Jainaryana Mehta	INC(I)	17,528	25.89	7,677	11.33
126	Banmankhi (SC)	Jaikant Paswan	INC(U)	24,608	43.48	Rashik Lal Rishideo	INC(I)	24,335	42.99	273	0.49
127	Raniganj (SC)	Yamuna Prasad Ram	INC(I)	24,070	44.13	Sukh Deo Paswan	JP(S)	16,248	29.79	7,822	14.34
128	Narpatganj	Janardan Yadav	BJP	20,198	28.43	Satya Narain Yadav	INC(U)	18,342	25.82	1,856	2.61
129	Forbesganj	Saryu Mishra	INC(I)	27,914	39.79	Nakshtra Malakan	CPI	20,255	28.87	7,659	10.92
130	Araria	Moh. Tasilmuddin	JP(S)	26,665	37.22	Shrideo Jha	INC(I)	16,182	22.58	10,483	14.64
131	Sikti	Shital Pd. Gupta	INC(I)	35,867	44.20	Md. Azimuddin	JP(S)	27,493	33.88	8,374	10.32
132	Jokihat	Moidur Rehman	INC(I)	21,459	36.66	Jahoruddin	IND	20,094	34.33	1,365	2.33
133	Bahadurganj	Najumuddin	INC(I)	19,773	34.14	Kalimuddin	IND	12,696	21.92	7,077	12.22
134	Thakurganj	Moh. Hussain Azad	INC(I)	30,073	50.23	Moh. Sulaiman	JP	27,566	46.04	2,507	4.19
135	Kishanganj	Moh. Mustaque	JP(S)	26,333	37.90	Rafique Alam	INC(I)	17,613	25.35	8,720	12.55
136	Amour	M. Moijuddin Minshi	INC(I)	14,917	24.13	Nazmuddin	JP(SR)	13,572	21.96	1,345	2.17
137	Baisi	Sayad Moinuddin	IND	21,094	39.37	Hasibur Rahman	INC(I)	15,236	28.43	5,858	10.94
138	Kasba	Md. Yasin	INC(I)	23,493	32.10	Shiv Charan Mehta	JP(S)	20,167	27.56	3,326	4.54
139	Purnea	Ajit Chand Sarkar	CPI(M)	27,486	45.00	Sharda Prasad Singh	INC(I)	17,398	28.48	10,088	16.52
140	Korha (SC)	Vishwanath Rishi	INC(I)	24,282	60.61	Bhoop Lal Paswan	JP(S)	14,313	35.73	9,969	24.88
141	Barari	Karuneshwar Singh	INC(I)	16,613	29.37	Sapana Devi	JP(S)	11,061	19.55	5,552	9.82
142	Katihar	Sitaram Chamaria	INC(I)	20,282	31.84	Jagbandhu Adhikari	BJP	18,638	29.26	1,644	2.58
143	Kadwa	Mangan Insan	IND	28,149	44.74	Ushman Gani	INC(I)	28,119	44.69	30	0.05
144	Barsoi	Beula Doza	INC(I)	26,635	47.34	Yuvraj	JP	25,493	45.31	1,142	2.03
145	Pranpur	Mohammad Sakur	INC(I)	18,918	38.35	Mahendra Narayan Yadav	JP(S)	16,600	33.65	2,318	4.70
146	Manihari	Ram Sipahi Yadav	JP	20,175	39.49	Mubarak Hussain	INC(I)	18,580	36.37	1,595	3.12
147	Rajmahal	Dhrub Bhagat	BJP	29,525	44.74	Raghunath Prasad Sodani	INC(I)	28,411	43.05	1,114	1.69
148	Borio (ST)	John Hemrom	INC(I)	12,417	36.94	Sheo Marandi	JMM	8,582	25.53	3,835	11.41
149	Barhait (ST)	Thomas Hansda	INC(I)	15,976	37.79	Masih Soren	IND	13,257	31.36	2,719	6.43
150	Litipara (ST)	Saimon Marandi	JMM	21,997	56.05	Khirsto Chandra Malto	JP	14,140	36.03	7,857	20.02
151	Pakaur	Abdul Hakim	CPI(M)	21,235	39.18	Hazi Moh. Ainul Haque	INC(I)	18,219	33.61	3,016	5.57
152	Maheshpur (ST)	Devidhan Basera	JMM	18,596	42.46	Kalidas Murmu	IND	12,304	28.09	6,292	14.37
153	Sikaripara (ST)	David Murmu	JMM	26,427	57.21	Chandra Murmu	IND	14,124	30.58	12,303	26.63
154	Nala	Bisheshwar Khan	CPI	19,944	37.40	Uma Prasanna Mahto	IND	16,063	30.12	3,881	7.28
155	Jamtara	Arun Kumar Bose	CPI	13,336	28.01	Md. Furkan Ansari	INC(I)	13,312	27.96	24	0.05
156	Sarath	Ashaya Charan Lal	JMM	25,969	39.31	Udaya Shankar Singh	INC(U)	22,966	34.76	3,003	4.55
157	Madhupur	Krishna Nand Jha	INC(I)	32,508	54.66	Ajit Kumar Banerjee	BJP	11,205	18.84	21,303	35.82
158	Deoghar (SC)	Baidya Nath Das	INC(I)	22,996	48.31	Rabi Kant Das	CPI	7,297	15.33	15,699	32.98
159	Jarmundi	Jawahar Parsad Singh	IND	14,935	28.52	Dip Nath Rai	IND	8,905	17.01	6,030	11.51
160	Dumka (ST)	Stephan Marandi	JMM	20,170	45.25	Stenshila Hembrom	IND	14,977	33.60	5,193	11.65
161	Jama (ST)	Dewan Soren	JMM	19,638	55.85	Prome Murmu	IND	10,625	30.22	9,013	25.63
162	Poreyahat	Suraj Mandal	JMM	24,894	41.71	Lakhan Mahton	IND	6,938	11.63	17,956	30.08
163	Godda	Hemant Kumar Jha	INC(I)	43,410	46.37	Sumrit Mandal	JMM	38,035	40.63	5,375	5.74
164	Mahagama	Awadh Bihari Singh	INC(I)	35,405	46.39	Sidique	JP(S)	20,281	26.57	15,124	19.82
165	Pirpainti	Dilip Kumar Sinha	INC(I)	31,270	39.43	Ambika Prasad	CPI	28,539	35.99	2,731	3.44
166	Colgong	Sadanand Singh	INC(I)	51,168	58.06	Jageshwar Mandal	JP(S)	12,634	14.33	38,534	43.73
167	Nathnagar	Talib Ansari	INC(I)	23,874	31.27	Chunchun Prasad Yadav	IND	21,192	27.76	2,682	3.51
168	Bhagalpur	Sheo Chandra Jha	INC(I)	24,347	40.64	Banarsi Prasad Gupta	JP(S)	21,034	35.11	3,313	5.53
169	Gopalpur	Madan Prasad Singh	INC(I)	24,156	34.00	Maniram Singh	CPI	15,289	21.52	8,867	12.48
170	Bihpur	Rajendra Prasad Sharma	INC(I)	26,316	37.08	Vrahma Deo Mandal	BJP	17,434	24.57	8,882	12.51
171	Sultanganj (SC)	Nand Kumar Manjhi	INC(I)	26,117	36.85	Fanindra Choudhary	JP(S)	16,380	23.11	9,737	13.74
172	Amarpur	Nil Mohan Singh	INC(I)	24,912	31.18	Dhirendra Prasad Yadav	JP(S)	21,912	27.43	3,000	3.75
173	Dhuraiya (SC)	Naresh Das	CPI	28,696	39.39	Ramrup Harizan	INC(I)	22,251	30.54	6,445	8.85
174	Banka	Thakur Kamakhays Singh	INC(I)	29,552	50.62	Sideshwar Prasad Singh	JP	9,689	16.60	19,863	34.02
175	Belhar	Chandra Mauleshwar Singh	IND	20,939	35.07	Chaturbhuj Prasad Singh	JP(S)	13,082	21.91	7,857	13.16
176	Katoria	Suresh Prasad Yadav	INC(U)	25,554	40.57	Jai Prakash Mishra	INC(I)	14,248	22.62	11,306	17.95
177	Chakai	Falguni Prasad Yadav	BJP	26,285	38.93	Narendra Kumar Singh	JP	17,911	26.53	8,374	12.40
178	Jhajha	Shiv Nandan Prasad	INC(I)	20,413	38.63	Shiv Nandan Jha	JP(S)	12,701	24.04	7,712	14.59
179	Tarapur	Narayan Yadav	CPI	17,711	22.14	Tarni Prasad Singh	INC(I)	15,161	18.95	2,550	3.19
180	Kharagpur	Jai Pra. Na. Yadav	JP(S)	17,318	22.34	Sadanand Singh	INC(I)	15,414	19.89	1,904	2.45
181	Parbatta	Ram Chandra Mishra	INC(I)	43,904	48.68	Nayeem Akhtar	JP(S)	19,060	21.13	24,844	27.55
182	Chautham	Ghanshyam Singh	INC(I)	26,043	31.46	Jagdambi Mandal	JP(S)	23,908	28.88	2,135	2.58
183	Khagaria	Ram Sharan Yadav	JP(S)	47,038	59.34	Krishna Chandar Verma	INC(I)	26,802	33.81	20,236	25.53
184	Alauli (SC)	Mishri Sada	INC(I)	28,720	49.00	Pashupati Kumar	JP(S)	19,280	32.90	9,440	16.10
185	Monghyr	Ramdeo Singh Yadav	JP(S)	40,788	42.88	Izharul Haque	INC(I)	36,081	37.93	4,707	4.95
186	Jamalpur	Upendra Prasad Verma	JP(S)	21,874	28.90	Akchhay Lal	JP	20,105	26.56	1,769	2.34
187	Surajgarha	Ramji Prasad Mahto	INC(U)	25,171	23.72	Prasidh Narain Singh	BJP	24,574	23.15	597	0.57
188	Jamui	Hardeo Prasad	IND	35,415	38.16	Tripurari Prasad Singh	JP	30,973	33.38	4,442	4.78
189	Sikandra (SC)	Rameshwar Paswan	IND	40,304	46.95	Loknath Azad	CPI	23,173	26.99	17,131	19.96
190	Lakhisarai	Ashwani Kumar Sharma	INC(I)	34,063	35.55	Yadubansh Singh	IND	24,547	25.62	9,516	9.93
191	Sheikhpura	Rajo Singh	INC(I)	73,537	66.23	Satish Kumar	CPI	29,676	26.73	43,861	39.50
192	Barbigha (SC)	Mahabir Choudhary	INC(I)	64,496	77.76	Ramji Prasad	JP(S)	10,349	12.48	54,147	65.28
193	Asthawan	Ayodhya Prasad	INC(I)	51,363	53.95	Arjun Prasad Singh	CPI	35,010	36.78	16,353	17.17
194	Bihar	Deonath Prasad	CPI	32,201	33.30	Nasim Uddin Ansari	INC(I)	22,361	23.13	9,840	10.17
195	Rajgir (SC)	Satyadeo Narayan Arya	BJP	36,142	46.23	Chandradeo Himanshu	CPI	28,571	36.55	7,571	9.68
196	Nalanda	Ram Naresh Singh	IND	45,547	45.79	Shyam Sunder Prasad	INC(I)	33,044	33.22	12,503	12.57
197	Islampur	Pankaj Kumar Sinha	INC(I)	52,923	49.66	Krishna Vallabh Prasad	CPI	51,310	48.15	1,613	1.51
198	Hilsa	Jagdish Prasad	BJP	30,056	30.64	Bhola Prasad Singh	JP(SR)	26,145	26.66	3,911	3.98
199	Chandi	Ramraj Prasad Singh	INC(I)	51,208	64.06	Hari Narain Singh	JP(S)	25,981	32.50	25,227	31.56
200	Harnaut	Arun Kumar Singh	IND	22,878	29.60	Nitish Kumar	JP(S)	17,818	23.05	5,060	6.55
201	Mokamah	Shyam Sunder Singh	INC(I)	24,494	28.35	Sheo Shankar Singh	CPI	19,204	22.23	5,290	6.12
202	Barh	Vishwa Mohan Choudhry	IND	38,472	38.81	Bijay Krishna Singh	JP(S)	36,886	37.21	1,586	1.60
203	Bakhtiarpur	Ram Lakhan Singh Yadav	INC(U)	76,359	66.99	Ram Chandra Chauhan	INC(I)	37,235	32.66	39,124	34.33
204	Fatwa (SC)	Punit Rov	JP(S)	14,540	22.30	Kauleshwar Das	INC(I)	9,758	14.97	4,782	7.33
205	Masaurhi	Ganesh Prasad Singh	JP(S)	46,334	41.02	Rabindra Prasad	JP(SR)	28,654	25.37	17,680	15.65
206	Patna West	Ranjeet Sinha	INC(I)	26,300	29.85	Krishna Nandan Sahay	INC(U)	24,659	27.99	1,641	1.86
207	Patna Central	Shalindra Nath Shrivastava	BJP	21,694	31.26	Anil Haider	INC(I)	17,413	25.09	4,281	6.17
208	Patna East	Sarad Kumar Jain	INC(I)	15,691	23.46	Ram Deo Mahto	BJP	15,411	23.04	280	0.42
209	Danapur	Budh Deo Singh	INC(I)	21,575	31.76	Sukh Sagar Singh	INC(U)	19,605	28.86	1,970	2.90
210	Maner	Ram Nagina Singh	IND	36,268	42.22	Suryadeo Tyagi	JP(S)	17,459	20.32	18,809	21.90
211	Phulwari (SC)	Sanjeev Prasad Tony	INC(I)	22,176	28.21	Dashrath Paswan	CPI	20,037	25.49	2,139	2.72
212	Bikram	Ram Nath Yadav	CPI	31,548	35.54	Diwakar Sharma	INC(I)	29,599	33.35	1,949	2.19
213	Paliganj	Ram Lakhan Singh Yadav	INC(U)	68,351	57.11	Kanhai Singh	BJP	39,049	32.63	29,302	24.48
214	Sandesh	Sidh Nath Rai	INC(I)	22,573	38.34	Sonadhari Singh	INC(U)	17,954	30.49	4,619	7.85
215	Barhara	Ramjee Prasad Singh	INC(I)	24,257	33.88	Raghuwendra Pratap Singh	JP	23,869	33.33	388	0.55
216	Arrah	S.M. Isa	INC(I)	36,781	54.30	Sumitra Devi	JP(S)	13,392	19.77	23,389	34.53
217	Shahpur	Anand Sharma	INC(I)	15,207	26.94	Hardeo Roy	INC(U)	11,423	20.24	3,784	6.70
218	Brahmpur	Rishi Kesh Tiwari	INC(I)	24,852	32.05	Swami Nath Tiwari	BJP	22,078	28.48	2,774	3.57
219	Buxar	Jag Narain Trivedi	INC(I)	24,166	41.54	Tej Narain Singh	CPI	13,237	22.75	10,929	18.79
220	Rajpur (SC)	Chaturi Ram	INC(I)	14,005	27.02	Nand Kishore Prasad	JP(S)	13,755	26.54	250	0.48
221	Dumraon	Raja Ram Arya	INC(I)	29,942	41.71	Ram Acharay Singh	CPI	23,442	32.65	6,500	9.06
222	Jagdishpur	Bir Bahadur Singh	IND	19,796	26.76	Hari Narayan Singh	JP(S)	15,614	21.10	4,182	5.66
223	Piro	Muni Singh	INC(I)	21,305	26.92	Indramani Singh	IND	13,592	17.17	7,713	9.75
224	Sahar (SC)	Dineshwar Prasad	JP(S)	18,743	33.22	Rajdeo Ram	INC(I)	16,500	29.24	2,243	3.98
225	Karakat	Tulsi Singh	JP(S)	34,033	36.77	Ram Ji Prasad Singh	CPI	19,128	20.66	14,905	16.11
226	Bikramganj	Akhlaque Ahmad	JP	27,711	32.63	Rajmukh Singh	INC(I)	14,552	17.13	13,159	15.50
227	Dinara	Lakshman Rai	INC(I)	34,708	40.38	Ramdhani Singh	JP(S)	27,707	32.24	7,001	8.14
228	Ramgarh	Prabhavati Singh	INC(I)	15,953	24.93	Sachchidanand	JP(S)	14,198	22.19	1,755	2.74
229	Mohania (SC)	Mahavir Paswani	INC(I)	22,935	43.52	Bhagwat Prasad	JP	13,364	25.36	9,571	18.16
230	Bhabhua	Shyam Narayan Pandey	INC(I)	33,536	42.69	Ram Lal Singh	CPI	21,202	26.99	12,334	15.70
231	Chainpur	Lal Muni Choubey	BJP	12,111	20.83	Ram Lahin Singh	JP(S)	11,763	20.23	348	0.60
232	Sasaram	Ram Sewak Singh	JP(S)	29,740	40.23	Manorma Pandey	INC(I)	25,771	34.86	3,969	5.37
233	Chenari (SC)	Dudnath Paswan	INC(I)	31,294	41.88	Chhedi Prasad	JP(S)	17,731	23.73	13,563	18.15
234	Nokha	Jangi Singh Choudhary	JP(S)	38,709	49.35	Jagdish Ojha	INC(I)	14,907	19.01	23,802	30.34
235	Dehri	Mohammad Ilias Hussain	JP(S)	15,640	22.32	Kurshid Anwar	INC(I)	13,607	19.42	2,033	2.90
236	Nabinagar	Radhubansh Pd. Singh	INC(I)	24,784	33.51	Ram Nandan Singh	INC(U)	19,096	25.82	5,688	7.69
237	Deo (SC)	Dilkeshwar Ram	INC(I)	39,537	69.48	Ganeshi Prasad	CPI	7,750	13.62	31,787	55.86
238	Aurangabad	Ram Naresh Singh	IND	21,149	28.36	Surajdeo Singh	SSD	14,356	19.25	6,793	9.11
239	Rafiganj	Vijay Kumar Singh	JP	39,320	55.21	Isteyak Ahmad Khan	CPI	17,721	24.88	21,599	30.33
240	Obra	Virendra Prasad Singh	BJP	38,855	41.03	Ram Valash Singh	JP	33,451	35.32	5,404	5.71
241	Goh	Ram Saran Yadav	CPI	34,589	41.23	Shriniwas	INC(I)	16,895	20.14	17,694	21.09
242	Arwal	Krishnandan Pd. Singh	IND	20,744	21.28	Deo Kumar Sharma	INC(I)	19,307	19.80	1,437	1.48
243	Kurtha	Sakdeo Prasad Yadav	JP(S)	34,953	34.75	Nagmani	SSD	29,192	29.02	5,761	5.73
244	Makhdumpur	Rameshrey Pradhan Singh	INC(I)	57,072	54.12	Ram Yalan Sinha	JP	28,724	27.24	28,348	26.88
245	Jahanabad	Tara Gupta	INC(U)	44,822	39.19	Fida Hussain	INC(I)	35,239	30.81	9,583	8.38
246	Ghosi	Jagdish Sharma	BJP	60,664	52.87	Ramashray Pd. Singh	CPI	53,310	46.46	7,354	6.41
247	Belaganj	Shatrughna Sharan Singh	INC(U)	29,847	31.65	Mahesh Pd. Yadav	IND	27,332	28.99	2,515	2.66
248	Konch	Raj Kumari Devi	INC(I)	42,049	47.43	Mundrika Singh	JP(S)	19,318	21.79	22,731	25.64
249	Gaya Muffasil	Awadhesh Kumar Singh	INC(I)	52,048	55.83	Surendra Prasad	INC(U)	37,512	40.24	14,536	15.59
250	Gaya Town	Jai Kumar Palit	INC(I)	18,530	28.21	Shakil Ahmad Khan	CPI	15,419	23.47	3,111	4.74
251	Imamganj (SC)	Shrichand Singh	INC(I)	29,879	69.00	Ishwar Das	JP(S)	10,678	24.66	19,201	44.34
252	Gurua	Md. Shahjan	INC(I)	22,758	29.82	Shankar Dayal Singh	JP	19,655	25.75	3,103	4.07
253	Bodh Gaya (SC)	Balik Ram	CPI	21,913	35.35	Rajesh Kumar	JP(S)	21,798	35.17	115	0.18
254	Barachatti (SC)	G. S. Ramchandra Dass	INC(I)	24,792	43.91	Mohan Ram	INC(U)	22,419	39.71	2,373	4.20
255	Fatehpur (SC)	Jitan Ram Manjhi	INC(I)	29,701	47.75	Ram Naresh Prasad	INC(U)	16,377	26.33	13,324	21.42
256	Atri	Surendra Prasad	INC(U)	43,898	38.47	Babulal Singh	BJP	29,891	26.20	14,007	12.27
257	Nawada	Ganesh Shankar Vidyarthi	CPI(M)	39,681	38.81	Rameshwar Yadav	INC(U)	25,782	25.22	13,899	13.59
258	Rajauli (SC)	Banwari Ram	JP	25,648	32.78	Babu Lal	BJP	23,475	30.00	2,173	2.78
259	Gobindpur	Gayatri Devi	INC(I)	42,019	46.51	Laxmi Narayan Singh	BJP	17,535	19.41	24,484	27.10
260	Warsaliganj	Bandi Shankar Singh	INC(I)	40,428	44.35	Deonandan Prasad	CPI	28,509	31.27	11,919	13.08
261	Hisua	Atiya Singh	IND	20,979	37.45	Lal Narain Singh	CPI	13,030	23.26	7,949	14.19
262	Kodarma	Rajendra Nath Dawn	INC(I)	27,129	47.61	Ramesh Prasad Yadav	INC(U)	12,767	22.40	14,362	25.21
263	Barhi	Niranjan Prasad Singh	INC(I)	12,298	30.42	Ram Lakhan Singh	CPI	9,797	24.23	2,501	6.19
264	Chatra (SC)	Mahesh Ram	INC(I)	22,973	63.10	Biku Ram	BJP	6,103	16.76	16,870	46.34
265	Simaria (SC)	Ishwari Ram Paswan	INC(I)	23,124	69.20	Upendra Nath Das	BJP	8,664	25.93	14,460	43.27
266	Barkagaon	Ramendra Kumar	CPI	23,936	39.33	Kailash Pati Singh	INC(I)	9,116	14.98	14,820	24.35
267	Ramgarh	Arjun Ram	JMM	24,154	41.59	Sabir Ahmad	CPI	14,268	24.57	9,886	17.02
268	Mandu	Ramnika Gupta	JP(S)	17,411	33.22	Tapeshwar Deo	INC(I)	16,421	31.33	990	1.89
269	Hazaribagh	Raghunandan Prasad	INC(I)	16,925	35.02	Radhey Shyam Ambastha	JP	9,539	19.74	7,386	15.28
270	Barkatha	Bhuwaneshwar Mehta	CPI	18,482	32.20	Lalita Rajya Laxmi	INC(I)	17,093	29.78	1,389	2.42
271	Dhanwar	Tilakdhari Prasad Singh	INC(I)	12,892	24.16	Harihar Narayan Prabhakar	BJP	8,957	16.79	3,935	7.37
272	Bagodar	Kharagdhari Narayan Singh	IND	18,285	38.91	Hriday Narayan Deo	INC(I)	8,367	17.81	9,918	21.10
273	Jamua (SC)	Taneshwar Azad	INC(I)	18,247	39.83	Baldeo Hazara	CPI	16,239	35.45	2,008	4.38
274	Gandey	Sarfaraz Ahmad	INC(I)	15,958	32.75	Salkhan Soren	IND	7,565	15.52	8,393	17.23
275	Giridih	Urmila Debi	INC(I)	28,997	55.71	Chaturnan Mishra	CPI	12,199	23.44	16,798	32.27
276	Dumri	Shiba Mahto	JMM	19,355	42.72	Lalchand Mahto	JP(S)	14,092	31.10	5,263	11.62
277	Gomia	Chhatru Ram Mahto	BJP	21,338	49.62	Dinesh Kumar Choubey	INC(I)	11,386	26.47	9,952	23.15
278	Bermo	Ramdas Singh	BJP	23,492	37.45	Kunwar Prasad Singh	INC(I)	17,507	27.91	5,985	9.54
279	Bokaro	Aklu Ram Mahto	JP(S)	32,969	34.73	Samresh Singh	BJP	23,145	24.38	9,824	10.35
280	Tundo	Binod Bihari Mahto	JMM	27,588	49.17	Norangdeo Singh	INC(I)	15,427	27.49	12,161	21.68
281	Baghmara	Shankar Dayal Singh	INC(I)	35,949	56.73	Basdeo Hazari	IND	15,000	23.67	20,949	33.06
282	Sindri	Anand Mahto	IND	37,824	58.47	Mokhtar Ahmad Ansari	IND	12,119	18.73	25,705	39.74
283	Nirsa	Kripa Shankar Chatterjee	IND	43,257	73.77	Chandan Ghosh	INC(I)	11,743	20.03	31,514	53.74
284	Dhanbad	Yogeshwar Prasad Yogesh	INC(I)	41,638	60.27	Gopi Kant Bakshi	CPI(M)	17,577	25.44	24,061	34.83
285	Jharia	Suryadeo Singh	JP	28,582	42.01	Ram Narayan Sharma	INC(I)	10,528	15.47	18,054	26.54
286	Chandankiyari (SC)	Haru Rajiwar	IND	19,059	48.48	Satika Dhoba	INC(I)	9,448	24.03	9,611	24.45
287	Baharagora	Devi Pada Upadhyaya	CPI	24,334	39.27	Vishnu Pada Ghosh	INC(I)	17,432	28.13	6,902	11.14
288	Ghatsila (ST)	Tikaram Majhi	CPI	14,580	44.81	Sashi Bhusan Manki	INC(I)	10,525	32.35	4,055	12.46
289	Potka (ST)	Sanatan Sardar	BJP	12,346	34.68	Salkhan Murmu	IND	9,734	27.35	2,612	7.33
290	Jugsalai (SC)	Tulsi Rajak	CPI	22,993	48.61	Ratul Muchi	INC(I)	10,718	22.66	12,275	25.95
291	Jamshedpur East	Dinanath Pandey	BJP	19,208	35.99	Ramashray Prasad	INC(I)	19,093	35.78	115	0.21
292	Jamshedpur West	Md. Samsuddin Khan	INC(I)	19,525	39.92	Marigendra Prasad Singh	BJP	19,467	39.80	58	0.12
293	Ichagarh	Ghanshyam Mahato	IND	22,588	43.80	Pravat Kumaraditya Deo	IND	11,221	21.76	11,367	22.04
294	Seraikella (ST)	Kade Majhi	BJP	13,024	41.53	Bhola Nath Tudu	INC(I)	8,065	25.72	4,959	15.81
295	Chaibasa (ST)	Muktidani Sambrui	IND	12,449	43.02	Harish Chandra Deogam	IND	6,744	23.31	5,705	19.71
296	Majhgaon (ST)	Devendra Nath Champia	INC(I)	12,089	54.08	Durmu Kalundia	IND	3,172	14.19	8,917	39.89
297	Jagannathpur (ST)	Mangal Singh Lamai	IND	9,039	32.33	Theodore Bodra	INC(I)	7,502	26.84	1,537	5.49
298	Manoharpur (ST)	Ratnakar Nayak	BJP	7,257	29.37	Machuwa Gagrai	JMM	6,395	25.88	862	3.49
299	Chakradharpur (ST)	Devendra Manjhi	JMM	23,336	63.91	Jagannath Bankira	BJP	10,575	28.96	12,761	34.95
300	Kharswan (ST)	Debi Lal Matisoy	BJP	8,174	28.97	Sidiou Membrem	IND	3,732	13.23	4,442	15.74
301	Tamar (ST)	Tiru Muchirai Munda	INC(I)	16,212	42.48	Budhan Lal Munda	CPI(M)	11,551	30.27	4,661	12.21
302	Torpa (ST)	Leyandar Tiru	INC(I)	6,581	46.37	Shushila Kerketta	IND	4,598	32.40	1,983	13.97
303	Khunti (ST)	Samu Pahan	INC(I)	11,960	57.40	Hathiram Munda	BJP	7,375	35.40	4,585	22.00
304	Silli	Rajendra Singh	CPI(M)	20,000	38.86	Rameshwar Mahto	JP(S)	17,851	34.69	2,149	4.17
305	Khijri (ST)	Umraon Sadho Kujur	INC(I)	13,203	28.52	S. Lakra	IND	8,849	19.11	4,354	9.41
306	Ranchi	Gyan Ranjan	INC(I)	19,090	34.18	Nani Gopal Mitra	BJP	13,308	23.83	5,782	10.35
307	Hatia	Subodh Kant Sahay	JP	10,260	21.66	P. N. Singh	INC(I)	9,655	20.39	605	1.27
308	Kanke (SC)	Ram Ratan Ram	INC(I)	13,986	35.53	B. D. Ram	CPI	13,173	33.46	813	2.07
309	Mandar (ST)	Karam Chand Bhagat	INC(I)	28,100	58.32	Lalu Oraon	JP(S)	9,926	20.60	18,174	37.72
310	Sisai (ST)	Bandi Oraon	INC(I)	13,948	38.69	Lalit Oraon	BJP	7,600	21.08	6,348	17.61
311	Kolebira (ST)	S. K. Bage	INC(I)	10,179	45.36	William Lugun	JP(SR)	4,446	19.81	5,733	25.55
312	Simdega (ST)	Mirmal Kumar Desra	BJP	12,084	41.67	Simon Tigga	INC(I)	9,155	31.57	2,929	10.10
313	Gumla (ST)	Bairagi Oraon	INC(I)	16,984	46.75	Jai Ram Oraon	IND	8,198	22.56	8,786	24.19
314	Bishnupur (ST)	Dhukhla Bhagat	INC(I)	18,717	58.13	Karma Oraon	BJP	9,373	29.11	9,344	29.02
315	Lohardaga (ST)	Indra Nath Bhagat	INC(I)	25,448	70.32	Arun Oraon	BJP	7,178	19.84	18,270	50.48
316	Latehar (SC)	Indra Nath Bhagat	INC(I)	12,611	49.61	Ramdeo Ram	BJP	10,730	42.21	1,881	7.40
317	Manika (ST)	Yamuna Singh	BJP	9,873	34.79	Mahavir Bhagat	INC(I)	8,411	29.64	1,462	5.15
318	Panki	Sankteshwar Singh	INC(I)	17,558	40.90	Hirshi Kesh Singh	BJP	11,916	27.75	5,642	13.15
319	Daltonganj	Inder Singh Namdhari	BJP	22,491	41.59	Dinanath Tewary	INC(I)	17,843	32.99	4,648	8.60
320	Garhwa	Yugal Kishore Pandey	INC(I)	16,122	34.07	Gopi Nath Singh	BJP	12,921	27.30	3,201	6.77
321	Bhawanathpur	Shankar Pratap Deo	INC(I)	35,238	62.52	Ram Chandra Prasad Kosh	JP(S)	13,005	23.07	22,233	39.45
322	Bishrampur	Vinodh Singh	JP	25,536	43.50	Chandra Shekhar Dubey	IND	16,565	28.21	8,971	15.29
323	Chhatarpur (SC)	Radha Krishna Kishore	INC(I)	19,930	56.80	Jorawar Ram	JP(S)	5,758	16.41	14,172	40.39
324	Hussainabad	Harihar Singh	INC(I)	25,488	50.08	Braj Nandan Singh	CPI	7,690	15.11	17,798	34.97
