= Zorawar (tank) =

Indian light tank

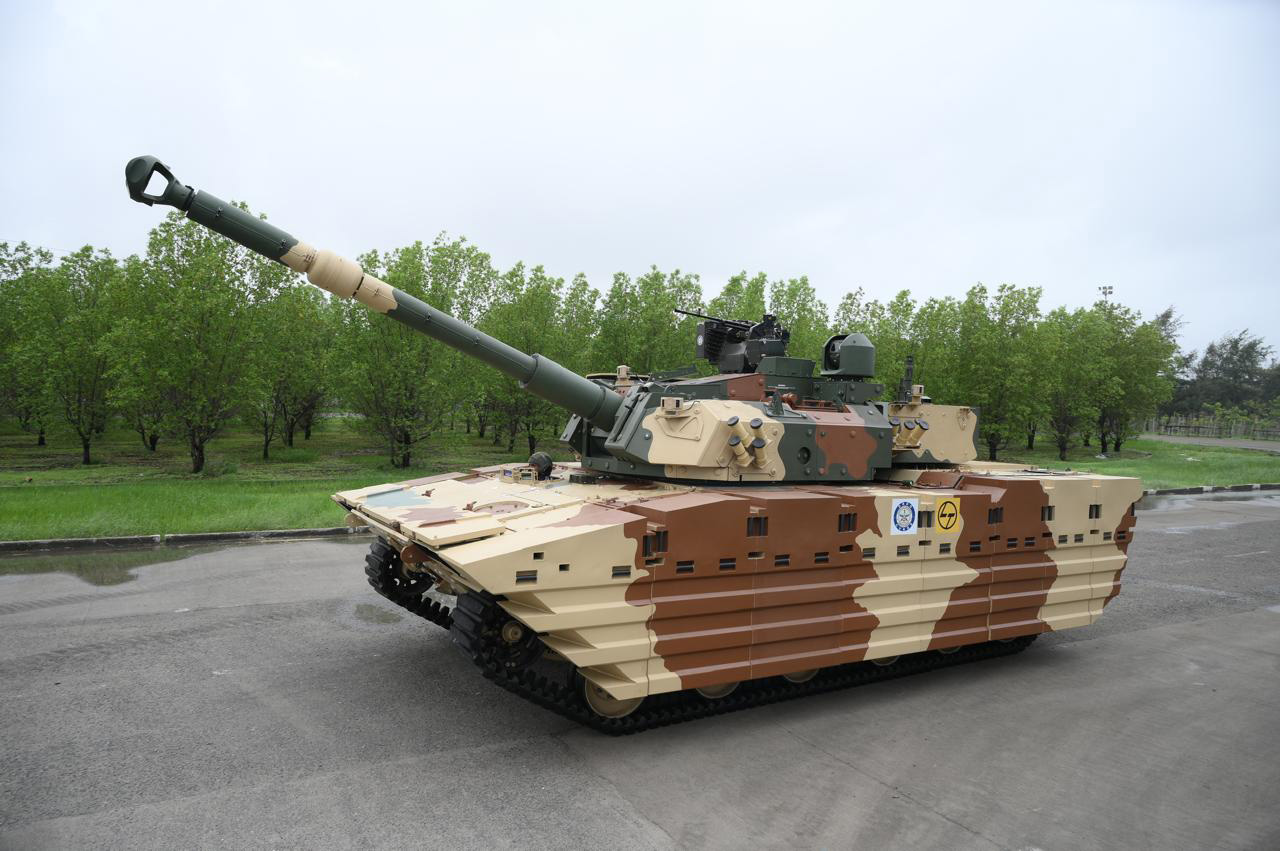
- Zorawar Light Tank
- Type: Light tank
- Place of origin: India

Service history
- Used by: Indian Army (intended)

Production history
- Designer: Lt Gen KS Brar; Combat Vehicles Research and Development Establishment; Larsen & Toubro
- Designed: 2022–2024
- Manufacturer: Larsen & Toubro
- Produced: 2024–present
- No. built: 2 prototype

Specifications
- Mass: 25 tonnes
- Crew: 3
- Armour: STANAG 4569 Level 4 standard for frontal protection (upgradable to Level 6); STANAG 4569 Level 2 standard for protection on side and other sections (upgradable to Level 5B)
- Main armament: Cockerill 105 mm high-pressure rifled gun in customized Cockerill 3105 Turret
- Secondary armament: 1 × 7.62 mm anti-air machine gun with BEL RCWS; 2 × twin side-mounted Nag Mk2 /UAV launcher; 16 × 81mm anti-thermal, anti-laser smoke grenade.; C-UAS system
- Engine: Cummins VTA903E-T760; 760 hp diesel engine
- Power/weight: 30-40 hp/tonne
- Transmission: Renk HMPT-800
- Suspension: Hydropneumatic
- Maximum speed: 70 km/h (43 mph); 35–40 km/h (22–25 mph) cross country

The Zorawar (lit. 'Forceful') is a light tank developed for the Indian Army. The tank is designed and developed by Lt Gen KS Brar, the Combat Vehicles Research and Development Establishment, with Larsen & Toubro being the development cum production partner.

The Zorawar has been designed to have a high power-to-weight ratio along with substantial firepower, protection, surveillance and communication capabilities. It is tasked to provide versatility to execute operations in varying terrain against diverse threats and equipment profiles of its adversaries.

== Background ==
=== Former light tanks of India ===
The Indian Army has a history of using light tanks in the mountainous terrains during combat situations. The Stuart and Sherman tanks of the 254th Indian Tank Brigade were used during the Battle of Kohima in 1944. In Indo-Pakistan War of 1948, the same tanks pushed back Pakistan forces in the Zoji La. In 1962 Sino-Indian War, the Army deployed French-origin AMX-13/75 tanks in the Battle of Gurung Hill near Pangong Tso and also in Bomdila and Dirang in Arunachal Pradesh. Again in the 1971 Indo-Pakistan War, the AMX-13 and Soviet PT-76B tanks were deployed during the Battle of Garibpur.

However, the Indian Army did not operate any light tank after the AMX-13/75 and PT-76B was retired from active service by 1989 and subsequently the PT-76B from reserved status in 2009.

India had taken several programmes since 1982 to develop an indigenous light tank to replace ageing light tanks. But the programmes failed.

The Ministry of Defence also issued a request for information in 2009 for the requirement of 200 wheeled and 100 tracked light tanks. But this did not yield results.

=== Challenges at high altitudes ===
India's armoured inventory consists of main battle tanks like the T-72M1, T-90S, Arjun Mk1 and Arjun Mk1A which weigh within the range 43–68 t (95,000–150,000 lb) and have a lower power to weight ratio which is unsuitable for deployment in high-altitude regions like Ladakh. By 2021, the Indian Army had deployed a squadron of 12 T-90 tanks as well as a K9 Vajra-T-equipped artillery regiment during the conflict. By 2023, over 90 tanks and 330 BMP-2s were deployed to the region. But the rarefied air, lower air pressure reduces the effectiveness of conventional armoured fighting vehicles (like MBT, IFV or Self-propelled Howitzer) in such regions which face logistical and operational challenges. Such deployments required design changes and additional logistics pressures. In fact, the vehicles needed to switch on engine for up to 30 minutes every two to three hours to prevent engine freezing.

Armoured vehicle require specific design modifications to operate at such regions. Such operational demands could easily fulfilled by light tanks. The PLAGF had deployed their Type 15 light tanks in the Ladakh region during the standoff for this reason. Furthermore the chinese have Type 63A-II, Type 63-II, Type 62G, ZBD-5 and ZBD-04A.

The lack of an equivalent light tank led the Indian Army to initiate a new Indian Light Tank programme which resulted in Project Zorawar under the patronage of Lieutenant general Karanbir Singh Brar, who was the Director General of Armoured Corps during the development of this tank, who also led the Trial Team of first T-72 Tanks to Ladakh in 1987. The tank is to be amphibious, airlift capable and also suitable for marshy and riverine terrain due to reduced nominal ground pressure.

=== Namesake ===
The project is named after General Zorawar Singh Kahluria, who led the 1841 Military Expedition to Mount Kailash and Lake Manasarovar during the Dogra–Tibetan War. He is referred to by historians as the conqueror of Ladakh and Tibet for his conquests of several kingdoms in the harsh conditions of the Himalayas.

== Design ==
Zorawar is a 3-crew, 25-tonne light tank with amphibious capabilities. The tank will have a high power-to-weight ratio and can be transported by air, rail or road. The light tank has superior firepower, protection, surveillance and communication capabilities. The tank is designed to destroy armoured vehicles, low-flying helicopters, and bunkers. For long-term use, the tank has an integrated auxiliary power unit and composite rubber-band tracks with hydropneumatic suspension.

The tank will be equipped with artificial intelligence, surveillance drones for enhanced situational awareness as well as loitering munitions. MSMEs in Vadodara, Rajkot, and Surat contributed to the project, and several of the tank's components were purchased locally. The gear mechanisms, rubber foundry, and cooling system for the tank were designed and constructed in India.

=== Armament ===
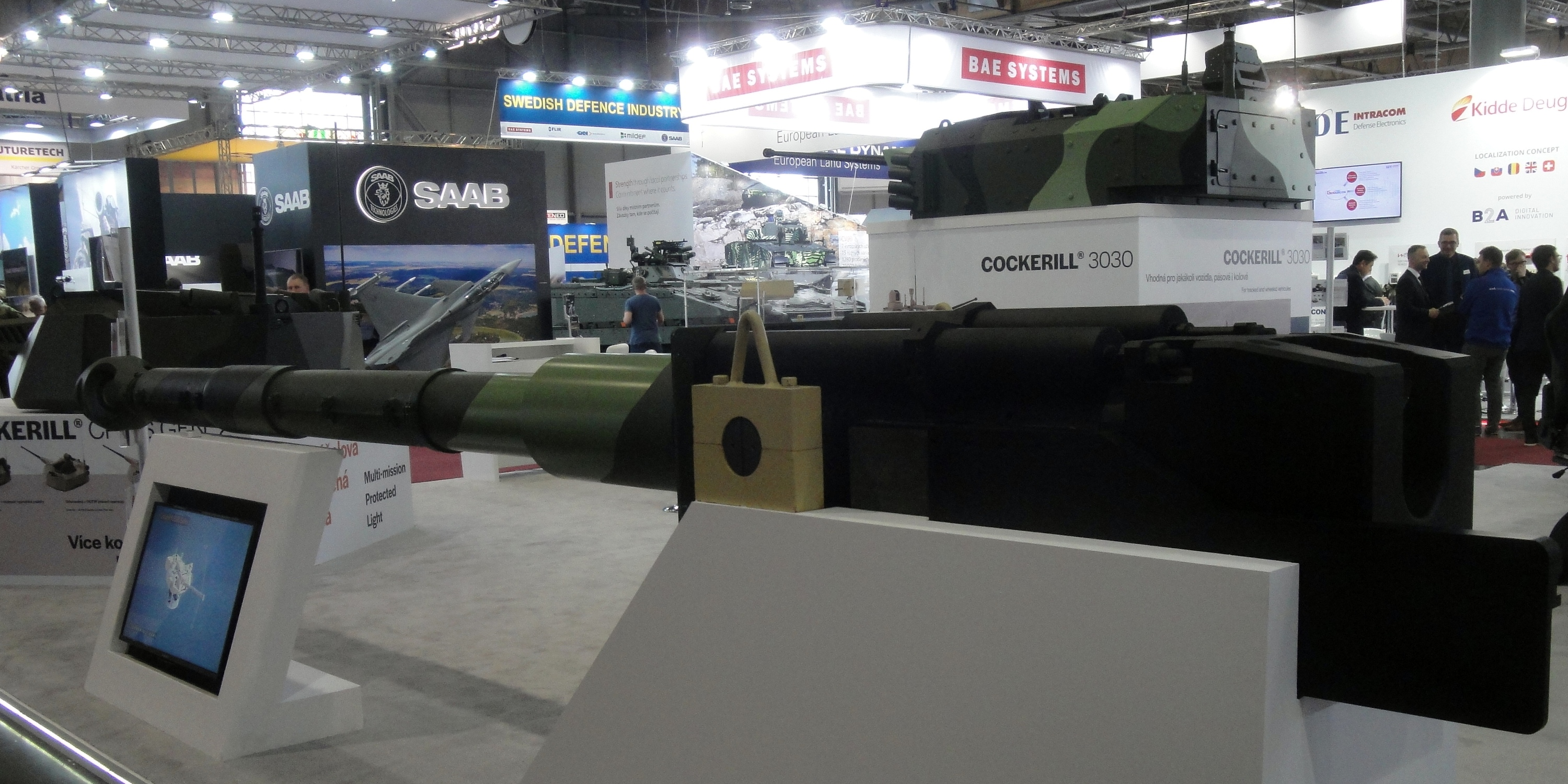
A Cockerill 105 mm HP Gun made by Belgian company John Cockerill

Zorawar is equipped with a 105 mm calibre gun turret procured from John Cockerill. The tank is also equipped with auto-loader and a remote-controlled 7.62mm calibre machine gun. The tank can launch anti-tank guided missiles from the main gun as well as a twin side-mounted launcher on the left side. In October 2025, the tank's ability to fire Nag Mk2 missiles in both direct and top-attack modes from the side launcher was demonstrated.

It also features two Safran Paseo electro-optical systems for hunter-killer capabilities, thermal imaging and laser rangefinders. The tanks are also reportedly equipped with C-UAS systems. Zorawar has an 80mm modular armored plate on its lightweight, highly durable titanium body. The tank's AI-powered fire control system enables it to recognize and lock onto targets automatically. The integrated counter unmanned air system is capable of autonomously detecting, tracking, and eliminating airborne threats.

=== Protection ===
Zorawar currently has a STANAG 4569 Level 4 frontal protection and STANAG 4569 Level 2 protection for the sides and other section. These can defend the tank and its crew from armour-piercing incendiary ammunition rounds of 14.5×114mm and 7.62×39mm calibre from 200-metre and 30-metre ranges, respectively. An active protection system is also planned to be incorporated into the design.

Further, it has been reported that the Defence Metallurgical Research Laboratory (DMRL) of the DRDO has confirmed its development of new armour with protection targets of Level 6 and Level 5B standards for the respective sections of the tank. Upon completion and validation, such standards are expected to defend the tanks from armour-piercing fin-stabilised discarding sabot (APFSDS) rounds of 30 mm and 25 mm calibre when fired from a distance of 500 metres, respectively. The upgradation is not expected to change the weight class of the vehicle.

=== Powerplant ===
The Zorawar tank prototype utilises a Cummins VTA903E-T760 engine which generates a power output of 760 hp (570 kW).

The tank was supposed to be powered by an 800 hp engine supplied by MTU Friedrichshafen, a subsidiary of Rolls-Royce Holdings, when sanctioned in April 2023. However, though the engine was ready to be delivered by October 2022, it was yet to be delivered until November 2023 due to the tough German export control regime. Thereafter, the developers switched to the American-origin Cummins engine. Larsen & Toubro purchased an engine directly from Cummins. The government also plans to ask engine manufacturer to set up an assembly or production line in India if the engine is chosen to power the production variant of the 354 tanks.

Reports in July 2024 also suggested that Rolls-Royce has delivered MTU 8V199 engine for the light tank project. The Defence Research and Development Organisation is also working on a project to develop an indigenous engine for production.

=== Transmission ===
During the development of the Zorawar program, the supplier for the transmission would be chosen between the German firm Renk and British firm Allison.

The Zorawar light tank prototype is equipped with a RENK America's HMPT-800 transmission, an advanced hydrostatic/mechanical continuously variable transmission also used in the U.S. Army's Armored Multi-Purpose Vehicle program.

== Development ==
In August 2020, Russia offered 2S25 Sprut-SD light tanks to the Indian Army which was being evaluated. Indian Army also observed the performance of the tank during trials in June 2021.

Meanwhile, the Defence Research and Development Organisation was in talks with L&T in 2020 and 2021 to develop a light tank version of the K9 Vajra-T howitzers which would weigh around 30 t (66,000 lb).

On 23 April 2021, the MoD issued a RFI to the industry for the requirement of 350 light tanks weighing about 25 t (55,000 lb) each. The tanks were required to be equipped for anti-armour, anti-air and anti-ground roles. The tanks were also required to be air transportable.

On 3 March 2022, the Government gave in-principle approval for indigenous design and development of the Indian Light Tank for mountain warfare. The procurement is to be done under the 'Make-I' acquisition (Government-funded) category of the Defense Acquisition Procedure (DAP)-2020, in line with the "Make in India" initiative.

In September 2022, the General KS Brar finalised the General Staff Qualitative Requirements (GSQR) and approached the MoD for the Acceptance of Necessity (AoN). During AoN approval, General KS Brar was again made Chairman of this Committee to resolve the categorization between Make-I and D&D. Usually, the User (Indian Army) is not involved in the initial design stages of DRDO development projects. However General KS Brar, who had taken over as DG Armoured Corps in December 2020, decided to change the norm with his operational and technical expertise; a major departure from erstwhile projects such as development of the Arjun tank. It was also confirmed that L&T has been selected as the development partner of the Indian Light Tank which is to be rolled out by 2023.

On 18 October 2022, the concept of the tank was unveiled during DefExpo 2022.

The project cost that was sanctioned stood at ₹234.5 crore (US$24 million). The project cost included the design and development of the tank and realisation of one prototype. The project included Larsen & Toubro as the lead systems integrator and several MSMEs.

L&T received the order to build the prototype in April 2023. The development will include the expertise gained from the development of DRDO Light Tank and L&T's K9 Thunder production. The initial speculation of using the K9 chassis for the tank was negated out as that would increase the weight to at least 34 tonnes against the requirement of 25 tonnes.

As per reports in April 2023, in spite of the fact that the Army will initially procure of 354 units, the numbers may increase to 700 units in later stages.

The Russo-Ukrainian War has reportedly caused supply chain choke-points for defense components, specifically electrical, electronic, and engine components, delaying projects, according to an August 2023 report by The New Indian Express.

In November 2023, it was reported that the prototype is in the final stages of manufacturing at L&T's AM Naik Heavy Engineering Complex at Hazira, Gujarat and was expected to begin track trials by year-end. Then, the Army and DRDO would decide whether to proceed with the following desert trails and winter trials in Ladakh.

On 7 July 2024, the first prototype of the tank was officially unveiled at the Heavy Engineering Complex of Larsen & Toubro. The roll out was done within 19 months of sanctioning the project. By then, the track trials were completed and certain design changes were made as per suggestions. The tank would now go for desert trials with the Army, followed by high-altitude trials in Ladakh. As per the current timeline, the tank will be inducted by 2027. The realisation of the first prototype was also revealed to the Parliament by the Minister of State for Defence Sanjay Seth on 26 July 2024.

On 6 January 2025, it was reported that the production of second prototype has commenced at L&T's Hazira facility.

=== Trials ===
Zorawar LT firing main gun during preliminary automotive trials

In January 2024, developmental or track trials of the tank prototypes began in Hazira, Gujarat, at the L&T facility where the prototypes were built. It is expected that the prototypes will be handed over to the Army by April 2024.

On 13 September 2024, DRDO successfully completed the Zorawar LT's preliminary automotive trials at Mahajan Field Firing Range near Bikaner. In the desert terrain during the field trials, the light tank performed exceptionally well, effectively achieving all of the targeted goals. During the first phase, the tank met the necessary accuracy on pre-designated targets after undergoing a thorough evaluation of its firing performance. According to the sources, the most important factor for a tank is precision, also known as FRHP (First Round Hit Probability) in technical parlance because it is necessary to hit the adversary first in modern warfare. The September trials was termed as the Phase 1 or Desert Trials of Zorawar.

As per a report in October 2024, the next trials shall include missile firing. The developmental trials would be concluded by January 2025 after which the tank will be handed over to the Army for user trials. The user trials will take 12 to 18 months as the Army will test the tank's performance in summer, winter and high-altitude conditions. DRDO maintains that the tank will be inducted by 2027.

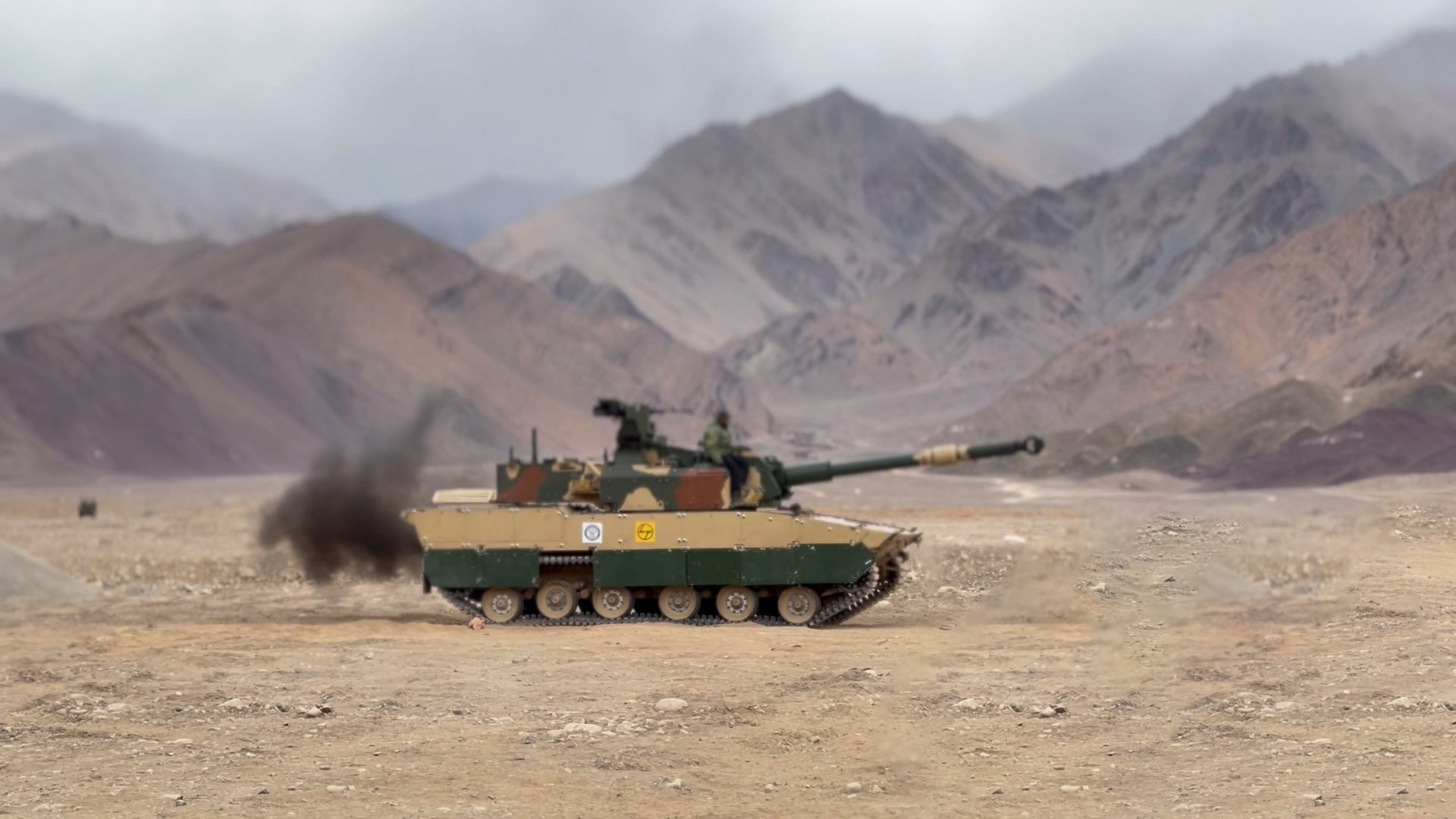
Zorawar LT was airlifted by Indian Air Force for high altitude trials

As of December 2024, the prototype is undergoing high-altitude trials in Nyoma, Ladakh at altitudes of over 4,200 m (13,800 ft). The tank successfully fired multiple rounds during the trials. The trials are being conducted under the criteria of its firepower, mobility and protection. The tank is also aimed to be amphibious for deployment in riverine regions, including the Pangong Tso in eastern Ladakh. The tank was airlifted to the high-altitude location by the Indian Air Force.

The user trials of Zorawar tank by the Indian Army was expected in September 2025 following conclusion of development or preliminary trials, which included mobility runs, basic firing of 105 mm gun and amphibians floatation trials. As reported on 7 September 2025, the tank is expected to begin user trials with the Indian Army within weeks.

On 4 June 2026, the Army chief, General Upendra Dwivedi, explained that the some issues in the tank were flagged during the trials which are being addressed and that the Zorawar was now expected to be inducted in 2028-29 given the successful completion of trials, user evaluation and production readiness.

== Orders ==
By April 2023, Defence Acquisition Council (DAC) has also approved seven light tank regiments. Of this one regiment is to be delivered by Larsen & Toubro and the rest from another firm through competitive bidding process.

An initial order for 59 tanks has been placed, which will be produced by Larsen & Toubro. The Indian Army will also be holding a competition for buying 295 light tanks, in which the Zorawar tank will take part in. According to reports that emerged in May 2024, Bharat Forge is also developing a light tank under 25 tonnes to compete with L&T's Zorawar Tank in the Army's light tank programme.

The purchase for a total of 354 tanks is expected to cost ₹17,500 crore (US$1.8 billion). The first batch of 59 batch is "reserved" for DRDO which includes L&T as the lead systems integrator. The rest of 295 tanks will be ordered and manufactured under Make-1 government funded category after a tendering process which will include L&T. As per a report in November 2024, the user trials by the Army in 2025 is to be followed by selection of 2 private companies for their prototype development based on Zorawar under the Futuristic Light Tank programme. Eventually, one of the designs will be selected for mass production after competitive trials.

As early as May 2025, L&T began preparing to launch Zorawar, its first AI-enabled light tank, off the assembly line at its Hazira factory in Gujarat. The first phase of the Zorawar tank project will manufacture about 400 units, with a projected cost of ₹70 crore (US$7.3 million) per tank. The estimated number of tanks needed is around 1,000.

In October 2025, it was reported that Armoured Vehicles Nigam is developing the Bharat tank under the Futuristic Light Tank programme. The development is expected to be completed within the year end while the prototype could be rolled out by 2026.

On 9 September 2026, it was reported that Tata Advanced Systems Limited was declared as the lowest bidder, while Mahindra Defence Systems Limited became the second lowest bidder for the light tank programme at a budget of ₹20,000 crore (US$2.1 billion). The selection process, including evaluation of technical and commercial bids, spanned three years and was delayed by a year when one of the five contenders raised objections against the selection. Following re-evaluation by the army and the defence ministry, the objection was found to be invalid. Thereafter, each of the companies will develop and demonstrate two prototypes of their design within 130 weeks. Following demonstration, the final production order for 295 units will be placed with both the companies. The quantity will be split between them.

== Operators ==
=== Future operators ===
- India
  - Indian Army - 59 on order (1 regiment). 354 more planned (6 regiments).

== See also ==
=== Contemporary competitors ===
- 2S25 Sprut-SD – (Russia)
- Type 15 tank – (China), or VT-5 (export model)
- Tanque Argentino Mediano – (Argentina)
- Kaplan MT / Harimau – (Turkey, Indonesia)
- Sabrah light tank – (Israel, Spain, Czech Republic)
- M10 Booker – (United States)

=== Historical Indian light tanks ===
- DRDO light tank – prototype developed from BMP-2 – (Soviet Union) in the 1980s and 1990s.

=== AFVs with similar firepower ===
- K21 – (South Korea)
- M8 Armored Gun System – (United States)
- General Dynamics Griffin – (United States)
- Mobile Protected Firepower
- Combat Vehicle 90 – (Sweden)
- WPB Anders – (Poland)
- Future Combat Systems Manned Ground Vehicles – (United States)
