= Prashant Kumar Ghosh =

Indian politician

Member of Parliament, Lok Sabha
- In office 1962–1977
- Preceded by: Minoo Masani
- Succeeded by: Ravindra Varma
- Constituency: Ranchi, Bihar

Personal details
- Born: 22 December 1927 Ranchi, Bihar, British India (Now Jharkhand, India)
- Died: 25 December 2013 (aged 86)
- Party: Indian National Congress

Prashant Kumar Ghosh (22 December 1927 – 25 December 2013) was an Indian politician . He was a Member of Parliament, representing Ranchi, Bihar in the Lok Sabha the lower house of India's Parliament as a member of the Indian National Congress. He was student of St. Xavier's College, Ranchi and St. Columba's College, Hazaribagh.
