= Nag (missile) =

Indian air-to-surface missile

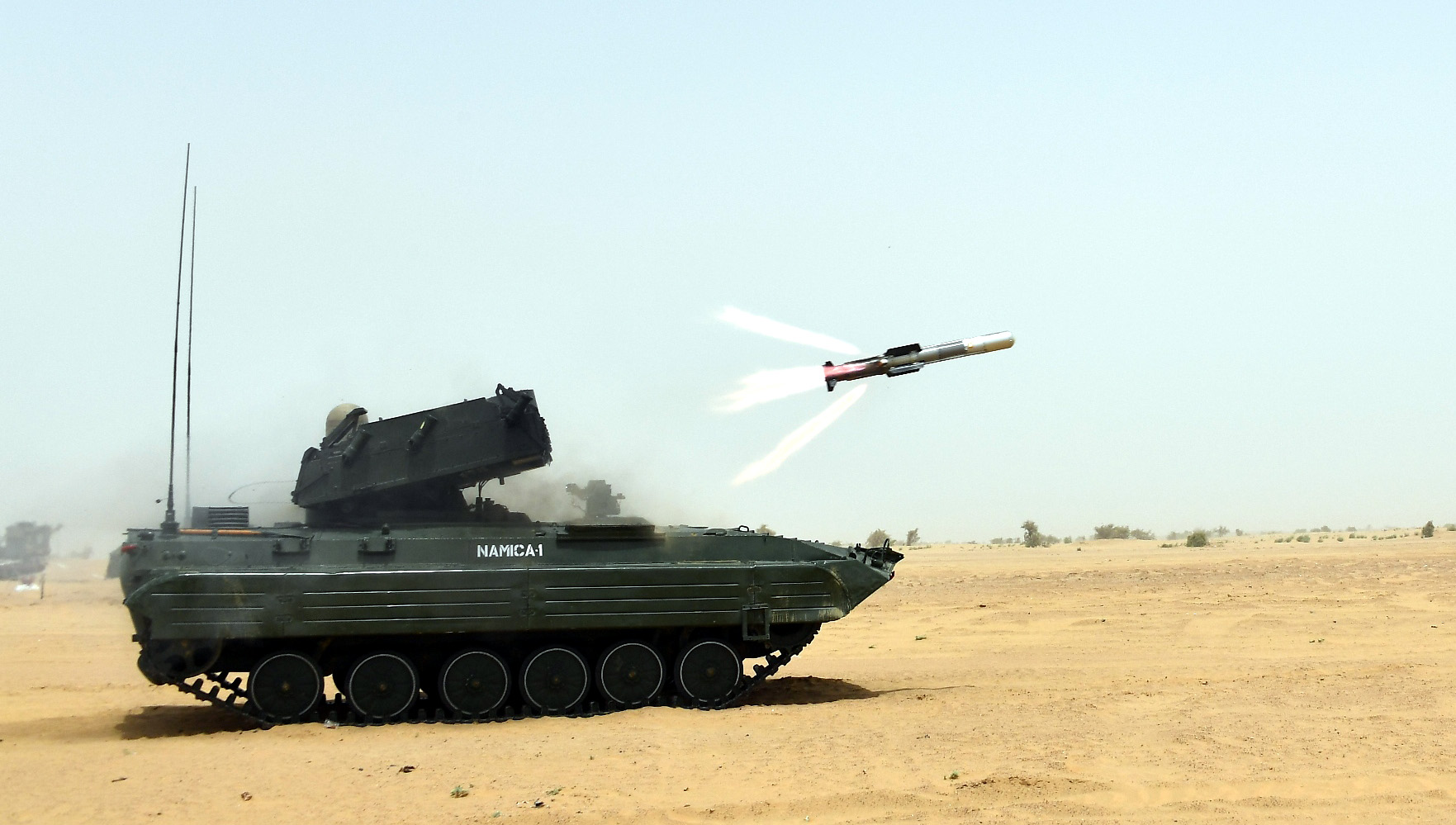
- Nag Missile fired from NAMICA-1
- Type: Anti-tank guided missile
- Place of origin: India

Service history
- In service: 2019–present
- Used by: Indian Army; Indian Air Force

Production history
- Designer: Defence Research and Development Organisation
- Manufacturer: Bharat Dynamics Limited
- Unit cost: ₹1 crore (US$100,000)

Specifications
- Mass: 42 kg (93 lb)
- Length: 1.83 m (6 ft 0 in)
- Diameter: 0.15 m (5.9 in)
- Wingspan: 0.4 m (16 in)
- Warhead: Tandem-charge HEAT (Penetration >900 mm in ERA + RHA)
- Warhead weight: 8 kg
- Engine: Solid-propellant rocket booster and sustainer motor
- Propellant: Nitramine smokeless extruded double base
- Operational range: Nag (ProspiNa): 500m–4km; HELINA/Dhruvastra: 7–10km; SANT: 15–20km
- Maximum speed: 220-230 m/s (792-828 km/h)
- Guidance system: Mid-course: CCD + area correlation + two-way datalink Terminal: IIR homing (HELINA/Dhruvastra); MMW ARH (SANT)
- Launch platform: NAMICA; HAL Rudra; HAL Prachand; Mil Mi-24; Zorawar LT

The Nag missile (lit. 'Cobra'), also called Prospina for the land-attack version, is an Indian third-generation, all-weather, fire-and-forget, lock-on after launch, anti-tank guided missile (ATGM) with an operational range of 500 m to 20 km depending on variant. It has a single-shot hit probability of 90% and a ten-year, maintenance-free shelf life. The Nag has five variants under development: a land version, for a mast-mounted system; the helicopter-launched Nag (HELINA) also known as Dhruvastra; a "man-portable" version (MPATGM); an air-launched version which will replace the current imaging infra-red (IIR) to millimetric-wave (mmW) active radar homing seeker; and the Nag Missile Carrier (NAMICA) "tank buster", which is a modified BMP-2 infantry fighting vehicle (IFV) produced under license in India by Ordnance Factory Medak (OFMK).

Development of the Nag is part of the Integrated Guided Missile Development Program (IGMDP), run by the Defence Research and Development Organisation (DRDO). It is manufactured by Bharat Dynamics Limited (BDL). India's Ministry of Defence announced on 19 July 2019 that the missile was ready for production. The Defence Research and Development Organization (DRDO) successfully completed the final trial of Nag anti-tank missile using a live warhead on a dud tank at Pokhran army ranges at 6.45 am on 21 Oct 2020.

== Development ==
Development of the Nag missile began in 1988 under A. P. J. Abdul Kalam. The first tests were conducted in November 1990. Development was delayed for several years because of issues with the IIR-based guidance system. The Nag missile underwent successful tests in September 1997 and January 2000. In 2000, MoD announced that the Nag was likely to enter full-scale production in early 2001. By 2008, the development cost had reached ₹300 crore (equivalent to ₹836 crore or US$86.8 million in 2023). In July 2009, the Nag ATGM was cleared for production. The final user trials were successfully completed in July 2010. The missile was cleared for mass production. BDL planned to produce 100 Nag missiles annually to replace the existing Konkours and MILAN second-generation missiles in the arsenal. The Nag successfully completed its final validation trials and was expected to join the Indian Army's arsenal in 2011.

In 2011, the project suffered a one-year delay due to the army's changing of its requirements for the NAMICA at the last moment. This was due to the failure of the missile to hit the target at 4 km range during the summer trials of 2011 in Rajasthan. The scientists found a fault in the Europe-imported heat-seeker: it was unable to distinguish between the heat signature of the target and its surroundings during high temperatures at long distances. This led to the development of a better indigenous seeker, with higher resolution and sensitivity, by Research Centre Imarat (RCI), that could track and distinguish targets at long distances. The first trials of the new seeker were carried out on 29 July 2013 in hot desert conditions in Rajasthan. The aerodynamic characterization research was conducted at the National Aerospace Laboratories' 1.2m Trisonic Wind Tunnel Facility.

The Nag cleared final developmental trials held by Indian Army in September 2016, making way once again for the weapon system to enter mass production. Its single-shot hit probability was initially 77%, which was later improved to 90%.

The missile was again declared ready for induction on 28 February 2018, after successfully destroying 2 tanks in desert conditions in a test. In 2018, the DRDO chief claimed that the Nag system would be inducted into the Indian Army by 2019. As of 2019, the missile was ready for induction and was expected to enter mass production by year-end, according to a senior DRDO official.

As of 2018, there was a requirement of around 3,000 Nag missiles for the land-launched variant of the Army.

== Production ==
- NAMIS order
  - 27 April 2018: Defence Acquisition Council, under the aegis of the Ministry of Defence and chairmanship of the then Defence Minister Nirmala Sitharaman, cleared the Acceptance of Necessity (AoN) of the NAMIS system for the Indian Army at the cost of ₹524 crore (equivalent to ₹701 crore or US$73 million in 2023). The contract included 13 NAMICA carriers and 293 Nag missiles.
  - 2022: The deal was cleared by the Cabinet Committee on Security.
  - 27 March 2025: MoD and Armoured Vehicle Nigam signed a ₹1,801.34 crore (US$190 million) contract for the purchase of NAMIS (Tr.). The contract includes the procurement of 13 NAMICA carriers and 293 Nag missiles. The system will equip the reconnaissance and support battalions of the Mechanised Infantry Regiment.
- HELINA order
  - 15 September 2023: The Acceptance of Necessity (AoN), worth ₹700 crore (US$73 million), for the procurement of more than 200 units of Dhruvastra (Air Force variant) for the HAL Rudra was cleared by the Defence Acquisition Council (DAC).
  - 24 June 2026: Bharat Dynamics announced that it has received a contract from Hindustan Airport to supply Helina missile launchers and line-replaceable units (LRUs) at a cost of ₹1,109.37 crore (US$120 million) along with another contract worth ₹238.34 crore (US$25 million) for Counter Measure Dispensing System (CMDS) LRUs. The orders will be executed between 24 and 60 months of signing the contracts.
- NAMIS Mk II order
  - 22 October 2025: It was reported that the defence ministry is poised to approve the procurement of 2,408 Nag Mk2 missiles along with 107 NAMICA 2 tank destroyers.
  - 23 October 2025: Defence Acquisition Council granted the Acceptance of Necessity (AoN) for Nag Missile System (Tracked) Mk-II (NAMIS).

== Design ==
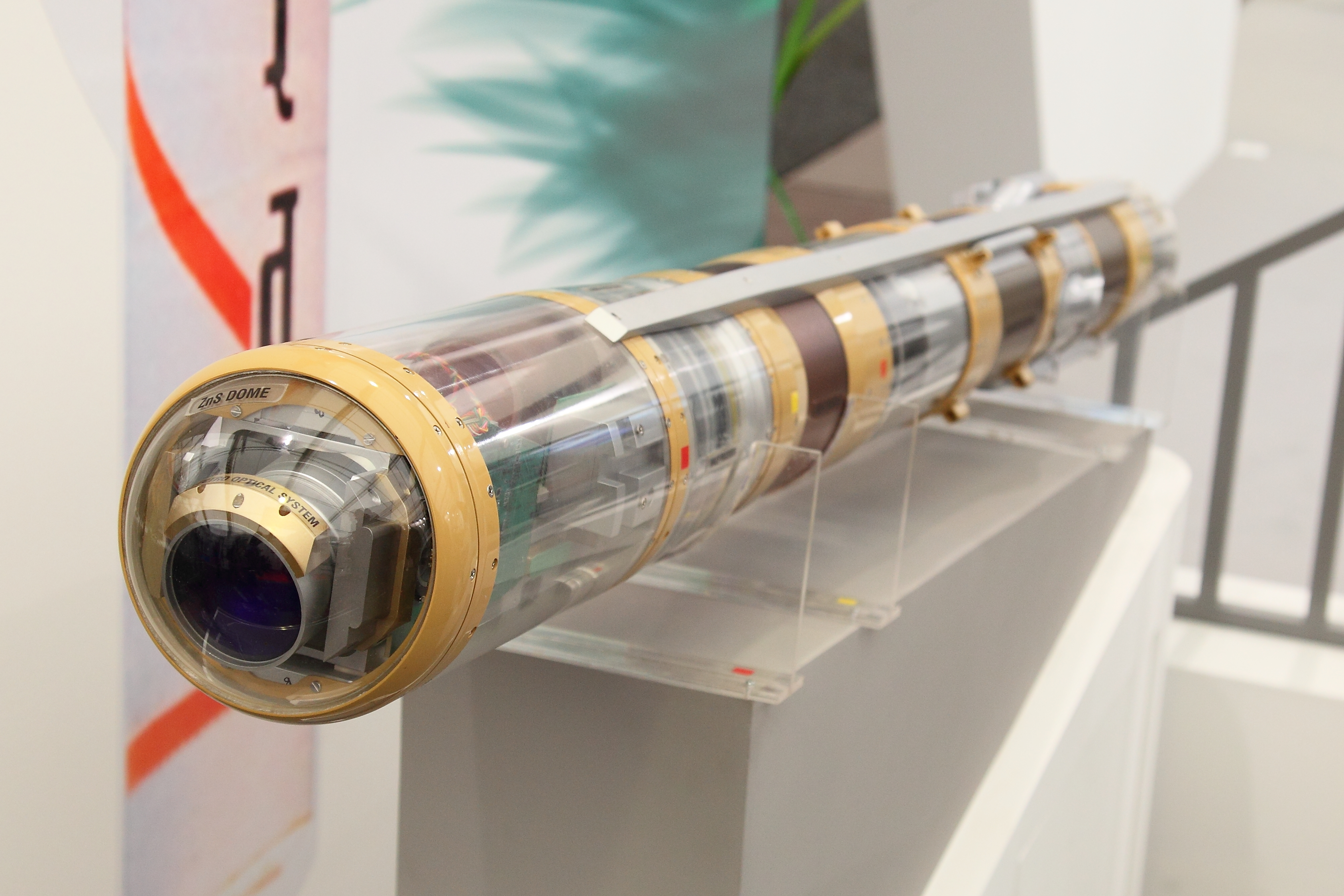
Nag missile (front end view)

The Nag missile's exterior is made of fibreglass.

It is developed for engaging heavily armoured tanks in all-weather conditions during day and night with a minimum range of 500 m and a maximum range of 4 km for the land variant. The third-generation fire-and-forget-class ATGM uses an imaging infrared (IIR) seeker that locks on to the target before launch. The Nag's airframe is constructed from composite materials that exhibit high resistance to enemy countermeasures. The forward dome houses the guidance system, while the middle section of the body accommodates sensor packages and the warhead. A booster rocket is positioned towards the rear end. The Nag features four foldable wings and four tail fins that stabilize it during flight. A real-time image processor, located adjacent to the guidance package, facilitates automatic target detection and tracking capabilities. The digital autopilot assists with guidance, stability, and control after launch.

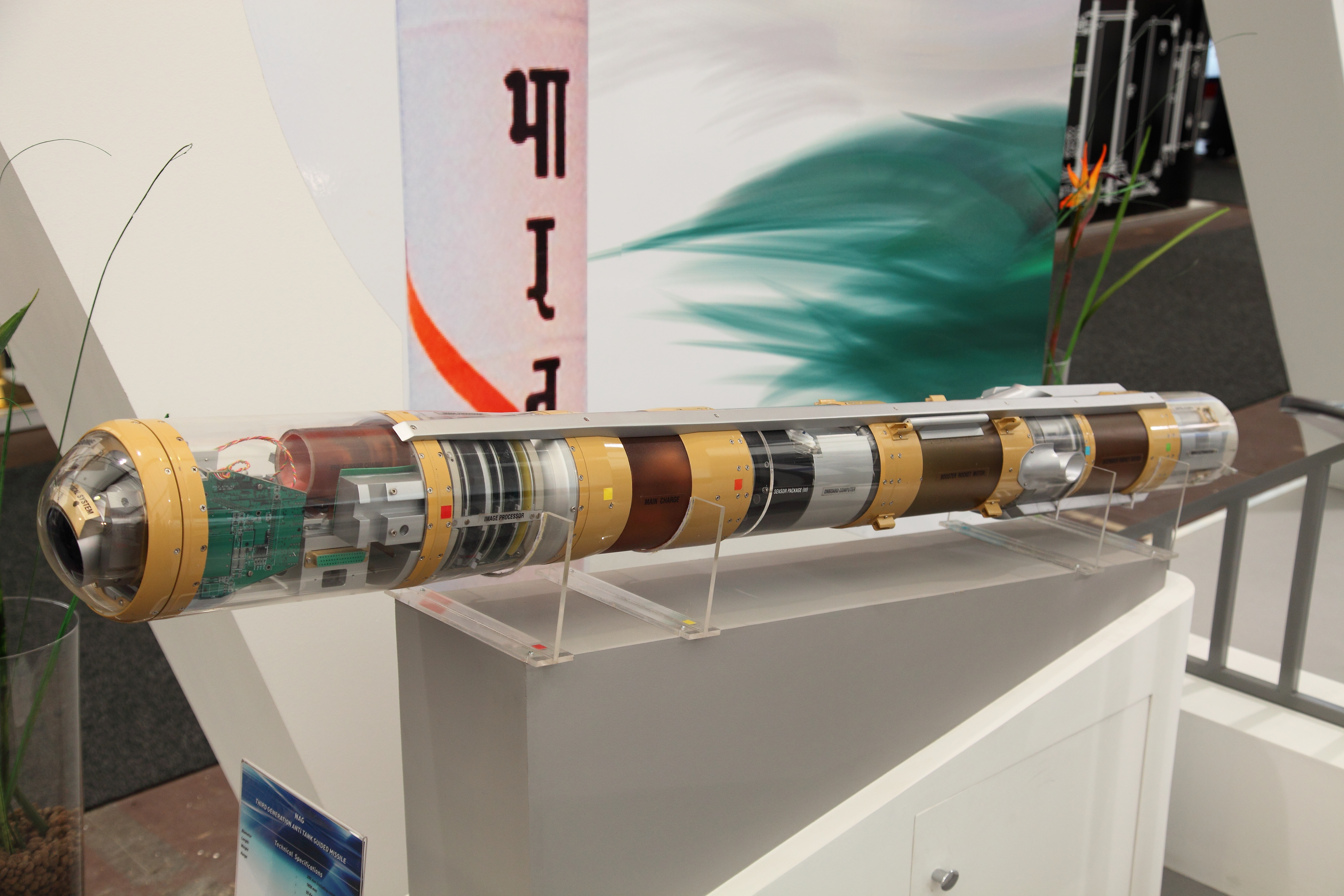
Nag missile (side view)

An electric actuation system also helps in flight control. The guidance system is based on an imaging infrared (IIR) seeker that ensures a high target accuracy in both top and front attack modes. A CCD camera integrated into the guidance system is useful as it is hard to jam. The initial guidance is provided by area correlation around the target, to which is added a centroid tracking mechanism. Homing in the terminal phase is done by area correlation around the centroid.

The Nag rises upwards suddenly and then bends at a steep angle to aim for the target.

== Variants ==
=== Missiles ===
- Nag/ProspiNa - The Nag or ProspiNa missile is the basic variant of the Nag family and is fired from the NAMICA platform.
- Nag Mk2 - The Nag Mk2 missile is a third-generation fire-and-forget ATGM. It is an enhanced version of the previous land-based Nag variant with a range of 4–10 km (2.5–6.2 mi). The variant will feature a jet-vane control system inherited from the HELINA variant for increased manoeuvrability. The missile will also feature an enhanced range compared to the previous version.
- MPATGM - The Man Portable Anti-tank Guided Missile (MP-ATGM) is an Indian-made third-generation anti-tank guided missile derived from the Nag missile. Recently, DRDO confirmed its production to start in 2021. The missile is under user trials phase of development.
- HELINA/Dhruvastra - HELINA (Helicopter-launched Nag) is air-launched version of the Nag with extended range. HELINA has a range of 7 km which will put the enemy tank commanders in curved terrain at severe disadvantages. The missile weighs only 43 kg which will not cause any burden in limiting conditions of the rarefied atmosphere over Ladakh. In terms of firepower, HELINA can penetrate armour as thick as 800mm which is more than enough for penetrating the armour of the light and medium weight tanks operated in the frontier. It is launched from twin-tube stub wing-mounted launchers on board HAL Rudra helicopters and HAL Prachand manufactured by Hindustan Aeronautics Limited (HAL). It is structurally different from Nag and is guided by an imaging infrared (IIR) seeker operating in a lock-on-before-launch mode for target engagement. It supports both top attack and direct attack functionality. HELINA completed all kind of user trials as of 20 September 2021. The Indian Army is ready for the missile acquisition which is expected to cost under ₹1 crore (equivalent to ₹1.1 crore or US$120,000 in 2023). The initial demand is of 500 missiles and 40 launcher tubes.
- SANT - SANT or Standoff Anti-tank Guided Missile is a fourth generation upgraded variant of HELINA missile developed for long distance airborne anti-armour role.
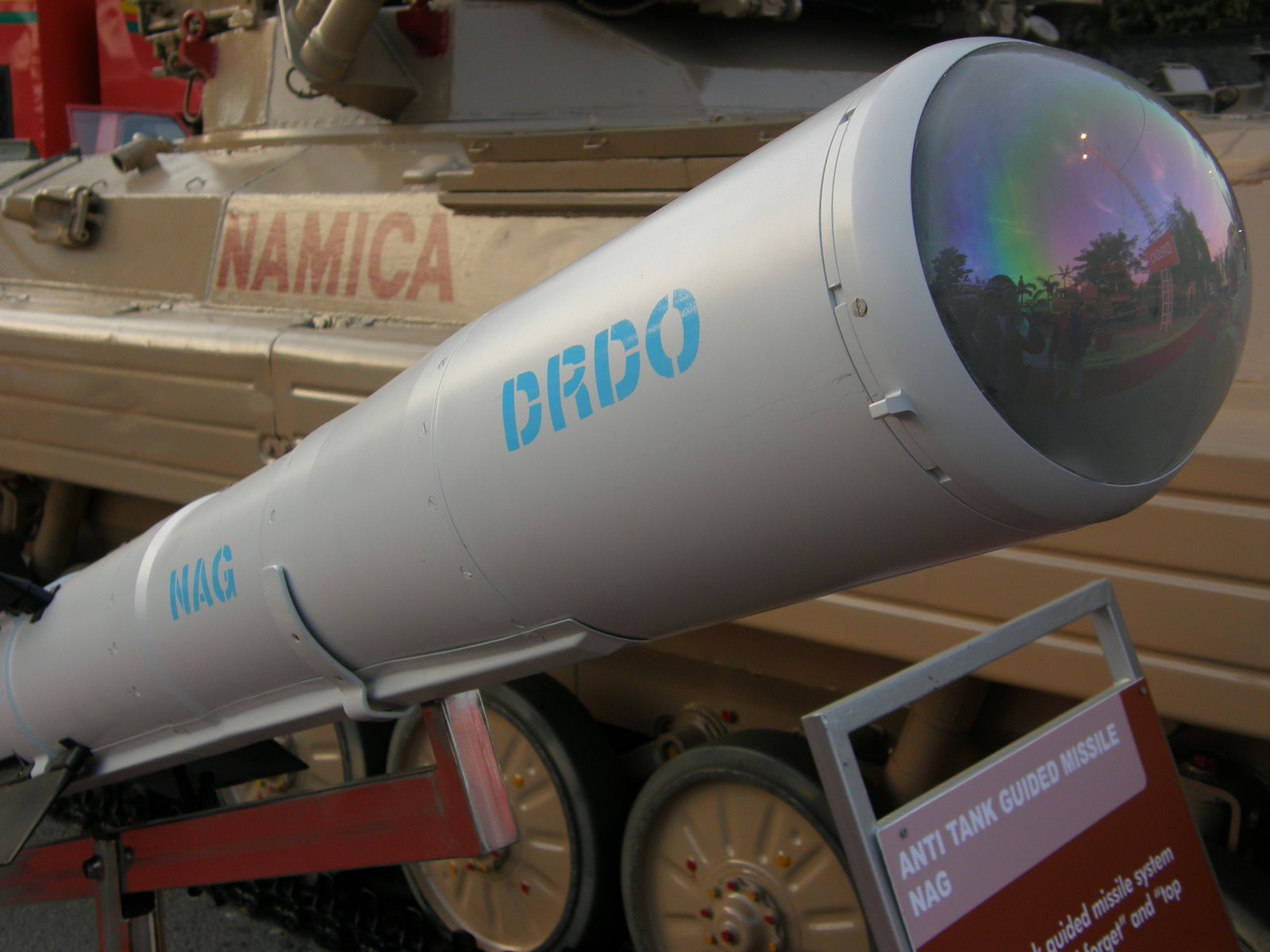
Closeup view of Nag missile with imaging infrared (IIR) seeker

Nag MK2 demonstrating shortest range hit capability.

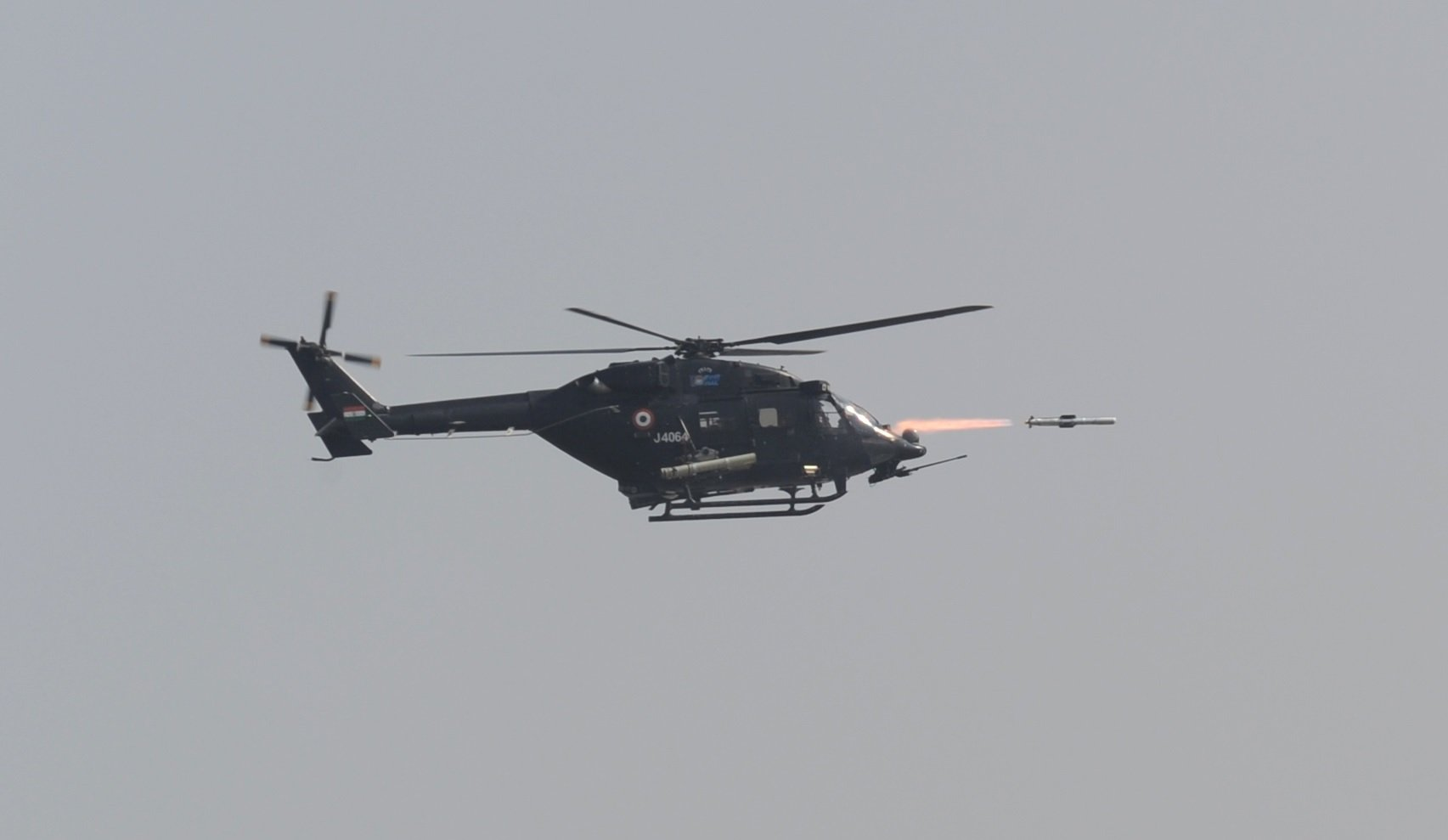
HELINA fired from HAL Rudra

SANT missile fired from Mi-24

== Platforms ==
As of 2017, the Nag missile's only operational launch platform is the purpose-built NAMICA missile carrier. A number of other variants were in various stages of development and testing.

=== NAMICA ===
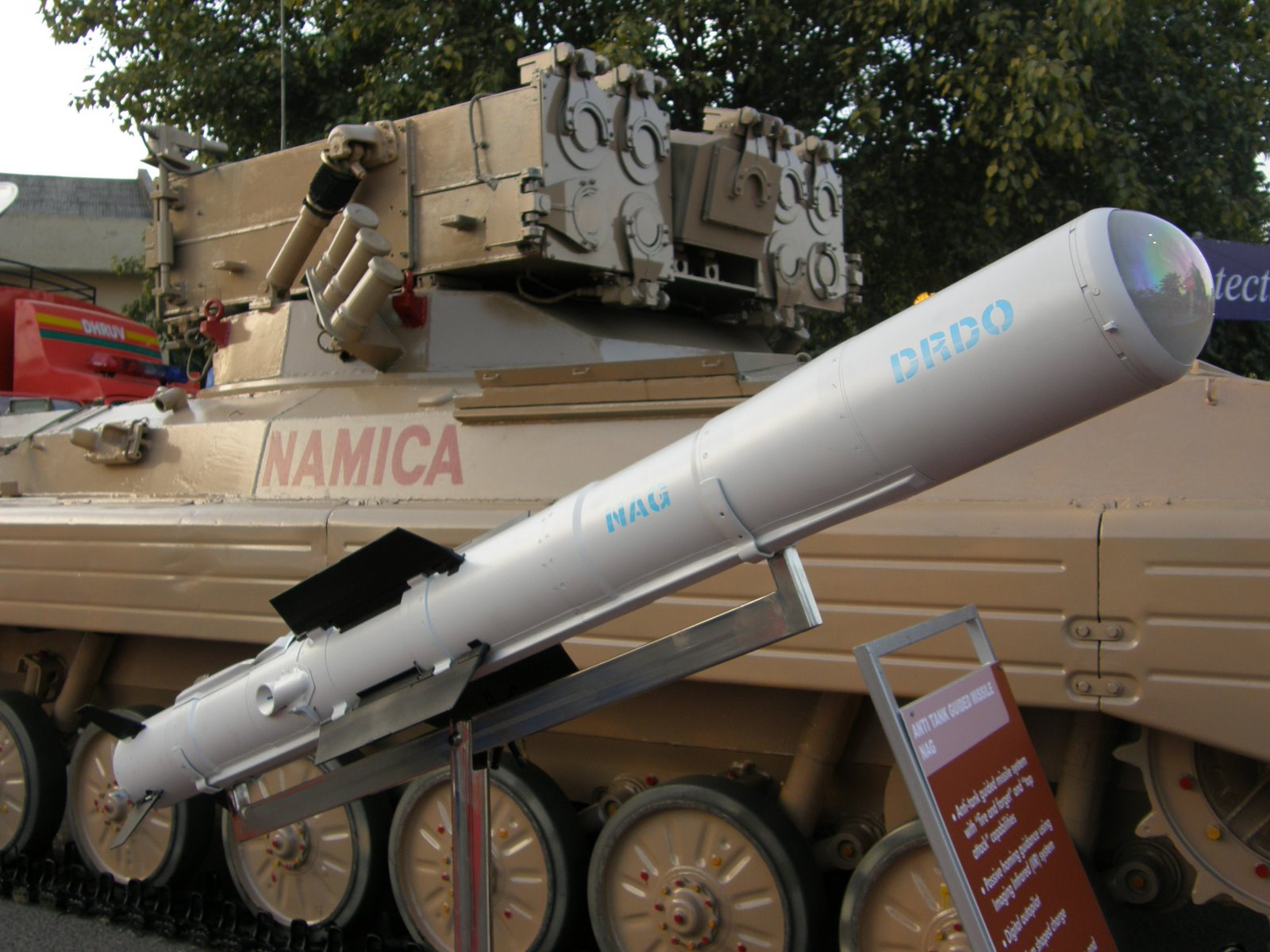
Nag Missile Carrier (NAMICA) is a modified BMP-2 platform license-built in India.

The NAMICA (Nag Missile Carrier) is a stretched, license-built BMP-2 with additional wheels, nicknamed "BMP-2 Sarath" in India. The NAMICA along with the Nag missile is designated as the NAMIS (Nag Missile System). It is classified as a tank destroyer. It is equipped with various electro-optical systems including a thermal imager (TI) and a laser rangefinder (LRF) for target acquisition. As unveiled in DefExpo 2008, the NAMICA carries a total of twelve missiles, with eight in ready-to-fire mode and four in storage. It has a compact auxiliary power unit (APU) for silent watch operation, a fire detection and suppression system (FDSS) and nuclear, biological, and chemical protection system (NBCPS). The carrier weights 14.5 tonnes in full combat load and is capable of moving 7 km/h in water. The carrier was put through transportation trials, covering 155 km during 2008 summer trials. It has various modes of firing, including top attack and indirect attack mode. It has a lock-on-before-launch system, where the target is identified and designated before the launch. The range of attack is limited due to its targeting system being based on visual identification. It supports a crew of four including the commander who is equipped with Land Navigation System (LNS).

The NAMICA successfully completed amphibious trials in the Indira Gandhi Canal at Rajasthan on 8 August 2008.

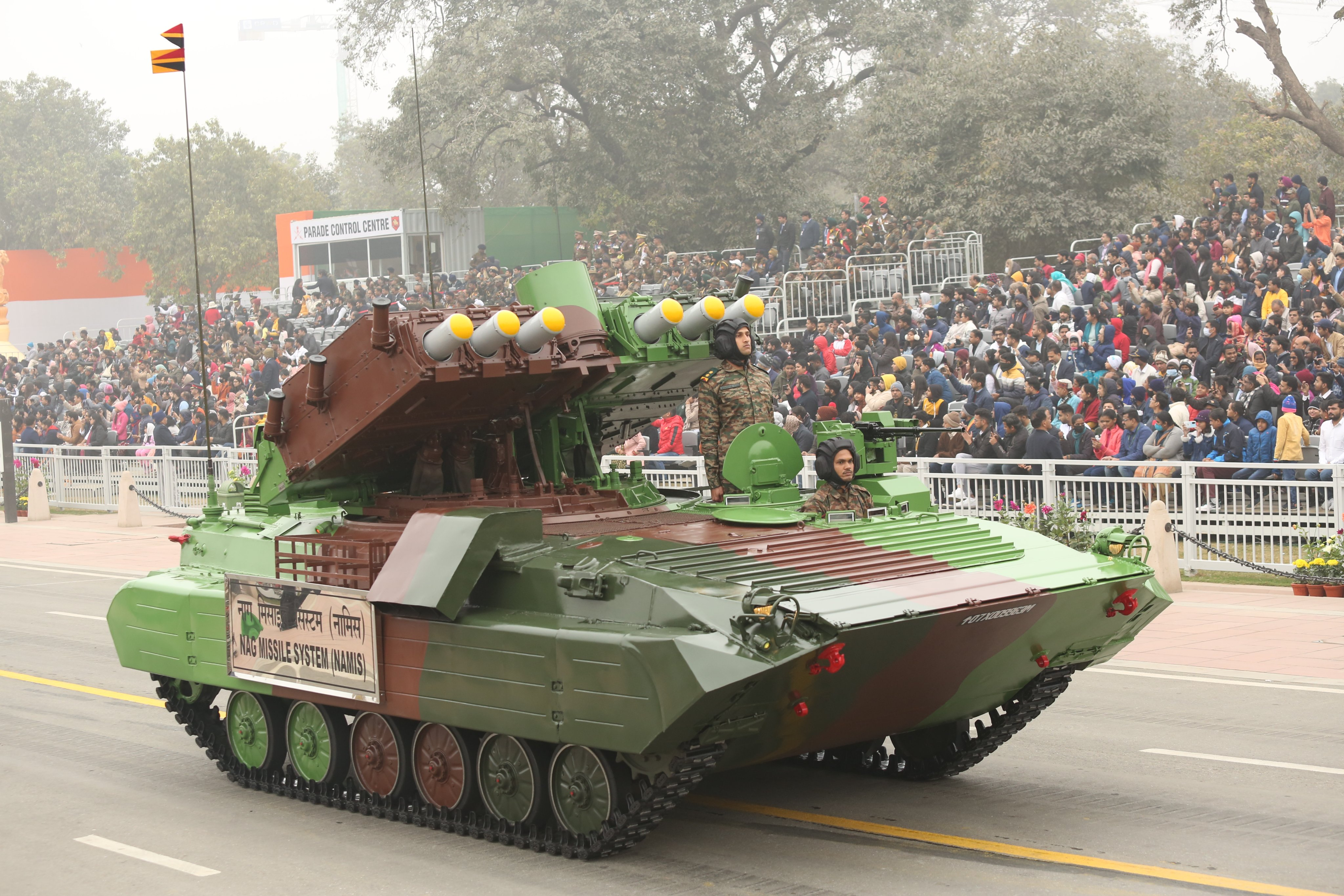
NAMICA 2 during Republic Day parade 2023

Another version of the missile launcher, NAMICA-2, was first tested in 2019. The newer variant was equipped with an improved targeting system and a launcher configuration of six combat-ready missiles against earlier eight. The development received approval in 2018. The launcher was first publicly showcased during the Republic Day parade in Rajpath at New Delhi in 2023.

Guided by NAMICA-2's Imaging Infra Red (IIR) seeker, Nag ATGM has a range of 7.5 kilometres. All the six missiles can be fired within 20 seconds in quick firing mode. It carries a crew of four. The total project cost of NAMICA is ₹3,000 crore and is developed by Defence Research and Development Laboratory (DRDL) and Ordnance Factory Board (OFB). Ministry of Defence cleared NAMICA for production as of 14 August 2020.

=== NAMICA Mk2 ===
The NAMICA Mk2 is the second generation launch platform for the design which is under development as of September 2024. Though it inherits the BMP-2 as its chassis, it has a different configuration from its predecessor. The system retains the 30mm autocannon turret and is fitted with two twin Nag ATGM launchers on the sides of the turret. The passenger compartment is replaced with a missile storage system. The system is poised to be lighter. On 13 January 2025, the Field Evaluation Trial of NAMICA Mk2 with Nag Mk2 was successfully carried out at Pokhran Field Range and was ready for induction by the Army.

=== Zorawar ===
The Zorawar light tank was tested in October 2025 to fire the Nag Mk2 missile from canisters on the tank turret.

== Trials ==
=== Land-based variants ===
- In August 2008, the Nag was successfully test-fired for two consecutive days from the test range at Pokhran, Rajasthan, marking the completion of developmental tests. The DRDO and the Indian Army planned to conduct user trials shortly thereafter. These would be the final trials to decide whether the system would go into production. As of 2008, over 60 developmental trials had been conducted by DRDO.
- During the user trials, the Nag missile was tested successfully by the Indian Army on 26 December 2008. The Nag missile zeroed in on the precise location of the target tank from a distance of 3.3 km (2.1 mi), as required by the Indian Army. The Indian Army was also extremely satisfied with the performance of the warhead of the missile.
- Another successful test was conducted on 28 December 2008. During that test, a moving target at 1.8 km (1.1 mi) was destroyed, along with a stationary target at a distance of 3.1 km (1.9 mi).
- A total of five missiles were fired during day and night against stationary and moving targets. Before the induction of the missile into service, summer trials were carried out in June 2009.
- On 20 January 2010 field tests of the Nag's thermal sight system, the system identified and locked on to a T-55 tank at a range of 5 km (3.1 mi). The trials were conducted using an advanced-imaging infrared-seeker head, per the Army's requirements. Another tank was engaged and destroyed at a range of over 4 km (2.5 mi) in a test of the missile's fire-and-forget capability, using the day version of the IIR passive seeker. In its IIR form, the Nag has limited all-weather capability. This limitation has provided added impetus to development of the mmW active seeker. Efforts were undertaken to provide special embedded on-board hunters that could hunt for targets using 'day seekers' and 'day-&-night seekers'.
- During trials in June 2010, the short-range capability of the missile to hit targets was validated. The Nag missile hit a target at a range of around 0.5 km (0.31 mi) in just three seconds. In the follow-on test, a moving target was hit within 3.2 seconds after launch.
- The final user validation trials were held on 16 July 2010 and successfully completed. A total of four missiles were test fired, two each against a moving target and a "derelict" Vijayanta tank, respectively. The tests validated validated the missile's ability at varying ranges of 500–2,600 m (1,600–8,500 ft).
- Two missiles were launched simultaneously against a moving target, and another two missiles were launched against a stationary Vijayanta tank in quick succession, and all successfully hit the targets. The Indian Army was satisfied with the performance and was expected to buy 443 missiles for ₹335 crore (US$34.8 million). The missiles along with the missile carriers were expected to be added to the Army's arsenal by 2011 with the successful completion of final validation trials in Rajasthan.
- In 2011, the project suffered a one-year delay due to the army's changing of its requirements for the NAMICA at the last moment. Missile tests during the summer of 2011 in Rajasthan failed to achieve its objective of hitting the target at the intended 4-km range. The scientists found a fault in the heat-seeker which led to the development of a better indigenous seeker, with higher resolution and sensitivity, by Research Centre Imarat (RCI), that could track and distinguish targets at long distances. The first trials of the new seeker were carried out on 29 July 2013 in hot desert conditions in Rajasthan. The evaluation trials of the missile with the improved seeker were carried out in August and September 2013 and provided fairly accurate results. Performance trials were expected to begin in early 2014.
- Nag scored a "bull's eye", successfully hitting a target 4 km away during a night trial in the Mahajan Field Firing Range, Rajasthan, in January 2016. During the test, the Thermal Target System (TTS) developed by a DRDO laboratory at Jodhpur was used as target for the missile. The TTS simulated a target similar to an operational tank by generating a thermal signature. The trial validated the enhanced 4-km range capability of the IIR seeker, which guides the missile to the target after its launch.
- The missile was tested successfully on 5 June 2017 at its maximum range of 4 km (2.5 mi) in hot-desert conditions in a daytime trial at the Chandan Field Firing Range near Jaisalmer, Rajasthan, with a successful follow-up test taking place on 13 June 2017. DRDO shared that the trials which concluded were successful for the extreme-heat daytime conditions of the desert.
- On 8 September 2017, MoD announced that the DRDO had twice successfully flight-tested the missile against two different targets in two tests in the ranges of Rajasthan. The missile successfully hit both targets at different ranges and under different conditions with very high accuracy, as desired by the armed forces. With these two successful flight trials, and the flight test conducted earlier in peak of summer, the complete functionality of the Nag ATGM, along with the NAMICA launcher system, was established, marking the successful completion of development trials of the Nag missile. In 2017, however, the Army said that the developmental trials of Nag carried out earlier had only demonstrated partial success and that many more user trials would be needed. In 2017, the DRDO claimed that the Nag missile would be ready within four years.

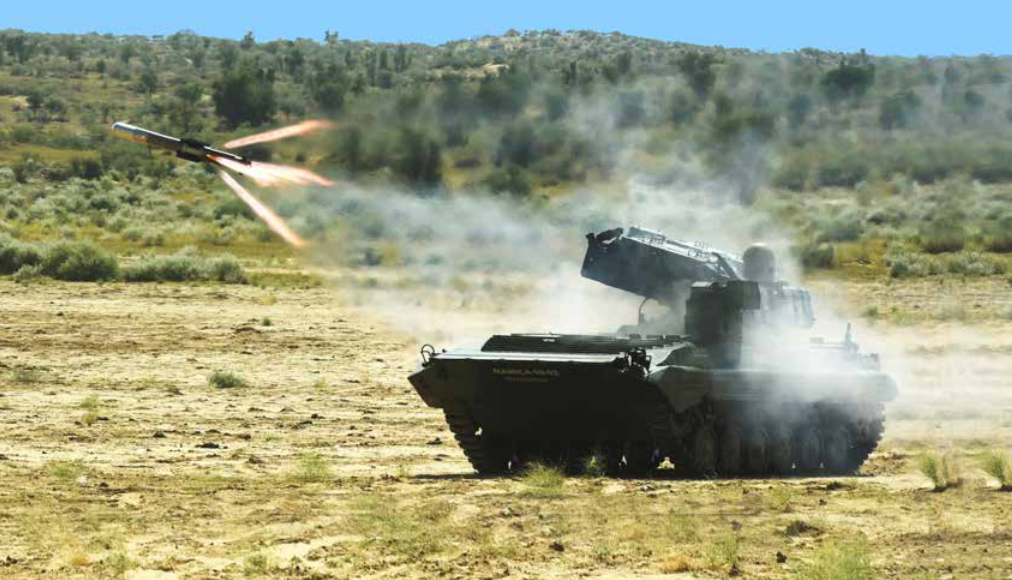
NAMIS at Pokhran Test Range on 28 February 2018.

- The missile was again declared ready for induction on 28 February 2018, after a test in which two tanks destroyed in desert conditions.
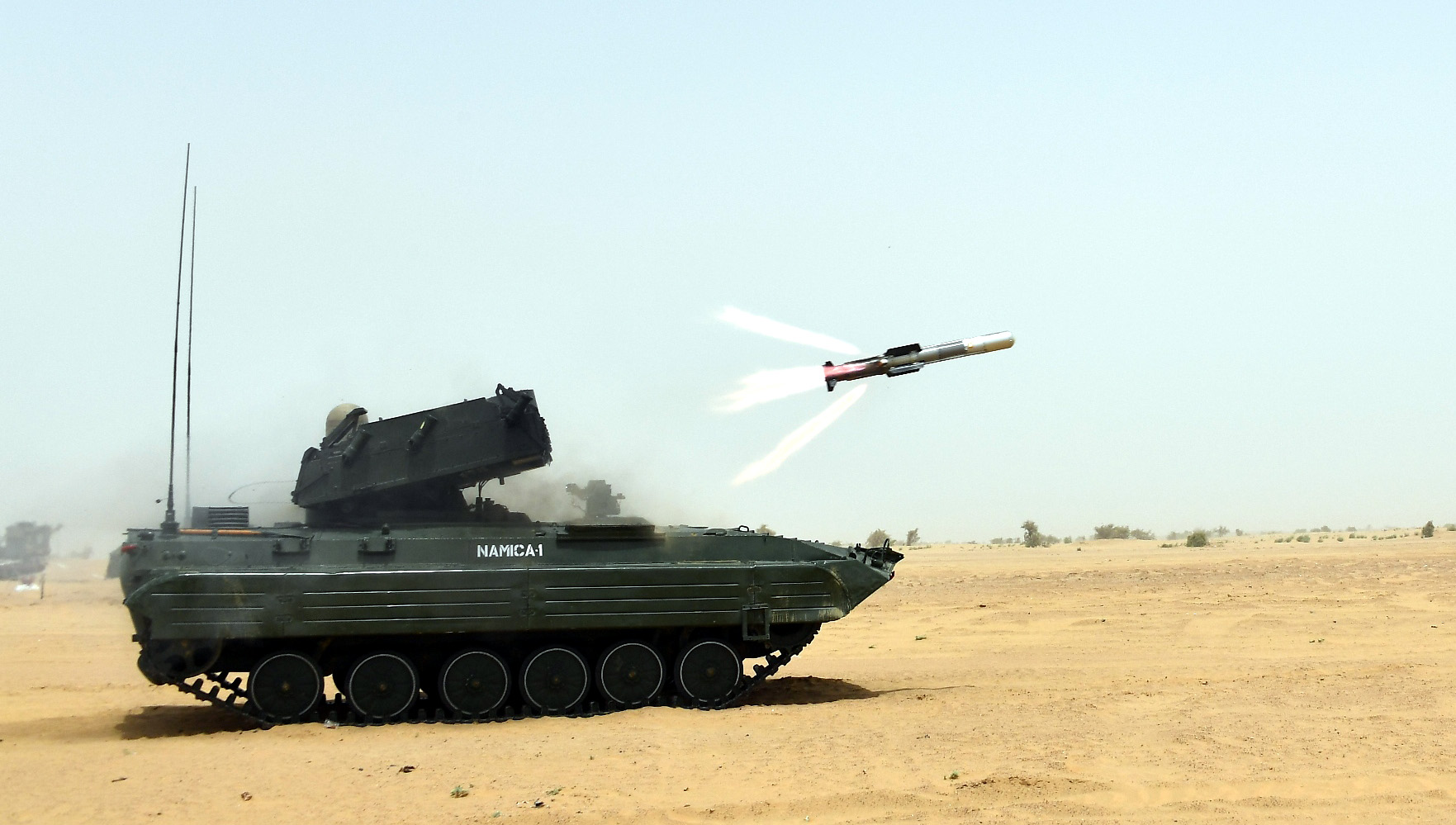
- NAMICA firing Nag missile during 2019 trials
  On 7 July 2019, the DRDO carried out three successful trials of the Nag missile in the Pokhran firing range. The missiles were tested during both day and night. The missile was reportedly in the final stages of being inducted. The Nag missile was successfully tested 12 times between 7 and 18 July 2019. It was tested under extreme weather conditions during day and night, in indirect attack mode as well as in top attack mode, and achieved a direct hit on each target. These trials completed the summer user trials and the missile was expected to proceed towards induction into the Indian Army. The trials were conducted from a new launcher NAMICA 2 with six-combat missile launcher configuration. The missile earlier participated in winter trials in February.
  Summer user trials of the Nag missile in 2019
- On 22 October 2020, India successfully carried out the final trial of the Nag anti-tank guided missile from NAMICA, after which the weapon system is now ready for induction into the Indian Army.
- The Indian Army successfully tested an upgraded anti-tank guided missile, on 13 February 2024. The missile struck dummy targets at the Pokhran field shooting range, where the army is conducting weapon tests as part of a war game.
- On 13 January 2025, Nag Mk2 successfully completed field evaluation trials at Pokhran Field Range. The missile was tested three times eliminated every target at both maximum and minimum range. A field evaluation of NAMICA Mk2 was also conducted. The weapon system consisting of NAMICA Mk2 along with the missile is ready for induction by the Indian Army.
- On 17 October 2025, Nag Mk2 was test fired from the under development Zorawar light tank in top attack mode.

=== Air-launched variants ===
- The first ground launch of the missile to check lock-on after launch (LOAL) capability were conducted in 2011 during which the missile was locked onto a target and launched. While the missile was in flight, a second target was chosen for the missile to hit, which the missile destroyed. This demonstrated the capability of the missile to lock onto and hit a target while in mid-flight. In the ground-launched LOAL test, the missile was launched in the general direction of the target. On approaching the target, images of the area ahead were sent from the missile to the operator via a two-way, radio frequency, command-video data link. The operator identified the target in the images and updated the new target location into the seeker, after which the missile homed in on the target and destroyed it.
- On 13 July 2015, three trials of HELINA were conducted by HAL at the Chandhan firing range in Jaisalmer, Rajasthan. The missiles were test-fired from a HAL Rudra; two missiles succeeded in hitting the targets at a range of 7 km, while one reportedly missed the target. After successful image capturing trials in Bangalore, DRDO planned to test HELINA with an updated 640×512-pixel resolution IIR seeker instead of the original 128×128-pixel resolution seeker in September 2016 for the Army Aviation Corps under hot desert conditions, with moving and static targets, for different range parameters.
- During May–June 2017, SANT was successfully test-fired from a Mi-35 helicopter.
- On 19 August 2018, HELINA was successfully test-fired from a HAL Prachand at the Pokhran Test Range.
- In November 2018, DRDO developed SANT was successfully tested at Pokhran range. The upgraded version of the missile is equipped with electro-optical thermal imager (EO/IR) and a new nose-mounted millimeter wave active radar homing (MMW) seeker with an extended range of up to 15 km to 20 km.
- DRDO and the Indian Army tested HELINA with a range of 7–8 km from the Integrated Test Range (ITR) in Chandipur, Odisha, on 8 February 2019 to check the maximum missile range and accuracy. The HELINA user trial was expected to be completed by 2020.
- On 19 October 2020, SANT was again test fired by the DRDO at Chandipur test range. It is developed for the Indian Air Force and Army Aviation Corps with lock-on after launch and lock-on before launch capabilities.
- The Indian Armed Forces successfully test fired the helicopter-launched Nag Missile (HELINA), now named Dhruvastra anti-tank guided missile in direct and top attack mode that is upgraded with new features. This variant is for the Indian Air Force. Three developmental flight trials were conducted from 15 to 16 July 2020 at Integrated Test Range, Balasore, Odisha from a ground based launcher.
- On 19 February 2021, The HELINA and Air Force variant Dhruvastra were reported to have successfully demonstrated their capabilities in a series of multi-mission user trials from HAL Rudra and were said to be ready for induction into the Indian Armed Forces.
- On 11 December 2021, DRDO and IAF flight-tested SANT from Pokhran ranges. The release mechanism, guidance and tracking algorithms, avionics with integrated software performed well.
- On 12 April 2022, HELINA was test fired from HAL Rudra in Pokhran. This trial has paved the way for the final integration of the HELINA into the HAL Rudra (Dhruv Mk IV/Dhruv WSI) platform of the Army.

== See also ==
- SAMHO – (India)
- MPATGM – (India)

Comparable weapons

- PARS 3 LR – (Germany)
- Spike-ER – (Israel)
- HJ-10 – (China)
- ALAS – (Serbia)

Related lists

- List of anti-tank guided missiles
- List of missiles
