= Ram Tahal Choudhary =

Indian politician

Member of Parliament, Lok Sabha
- In office 16 May 2014 – 23 May 2019
- Preceded by: Subodh Kant Sahay
- Succeeded by: Sanjay Seth
- Constituency: Ranchi
- In office June 1991 – 16 May 2004
- Preceded by: Subodh Kant Sahay
- Constituency: Ranchi

Personal details
- Born: 1 January 1942 (age 84) Kuchchu, Ormanjhi, Ranchi, Bihar Province (now Jharkhand)
- Party: INC
- Spouse: Smt. Savitri Devi
- Children: 4
- As of 9 November, 2019

Ram Tahal Choudhary (born 1942; Hindi pronunciation: [ɾaːm ʈəɦəl t͡ʃɔːd̪ʱ.ɾiː]) is an Indian politician, Educationalist, philanthropist. He was a BJP member of the Lok Sabha from Ranchi in Jharkhand from 1991 to 2004, and then 2014 to 2019. He used to belong to Bharatiya Janata Party, but resigned from the party when he was denied a ticket for 2019 Lok Sabha polls. He contested from Ranchi as an independent in 2019 but polled less than 2.5% votes. He had earlier served as member of Bihar Legislative Assembly.

== Early life ==
Ram Tahal Choudhary is son of Late Dashrath Choudhary. He was born in Kuchchu village in Ormanjhi Block of Ranchi district. His father's name was Dashrath Choudhary and mother's name Janki Devi. He married Savitri Devi and has two sons and two daughters. He is a Hindu by religion and Kudmi Mahato by caste.

== Career ==
He was chief of Gram panchayat in Kuchchu village in Ormanjhi. Then he was elected to Bihar legislative assembly from 1969 to 1971 and 1972 to 1977. Then he was head of gram panchayat of Ormanjhi from 1977 to 1996. Then he became president of Bharatiya Janata party in Ranchi in 1988. In 1991 and 1996, he became a member of Parliament of Lok Sabha for two terms. Then he re-elected to Lok Sabha in 1988 and again in 1999. In 2014, he was again elected to the Lok Sabha.

== Philanthropy ==
Choudhary has established many educational institutions in Ranchi. He established Ram Tahal Choudhary High School in 1978 at Buti Ranchi. This school is affiliated to CBSE, Delhi and comes under CBSE, Patna zone. He established Ram Tahal Choudhary Institute of Technology in 2008 and is affiliated from Ranchi University and is approved by All India Council of Technical Education. He also established Ram Tahal Choudhary B.Ed College and is affiliated from Ranchi University.

=== Ram Tahal Choudhary High School ===
Ram Tahal Choudhary High School is a school established in 1978 by Ram Tahal Choudhary in Buti Ranchi. This school is affiliated to CBSE, Delhi and comes under CBSE, Patna zone.

=== Ram Tahal Choudhary Institute of Technology ===
Ram Tahal Choudhary Institute of Technology was established in 2008. It is affiliated with Ranchi University and is approved by the All India Council of Technical Education.

=== Ram Tahal Choudhary B.ed College ===
This college is known as RTC B.ed College. This college provides Bachelor of Education degrees and is affiliated with Ranchi University

=== Ram Tahal Chaudhary Petrol Pump ===
He owns several petrol pumps in Jharkhand state.
