= Ranchi Lok Sabha constituency =

Lok Sabha constituency in Jharkhand

Coordinates: 23.4°N 85.3°E

Ranchi JH-8
- Lok Sabha constituency
- Interactive map of Ranchi Lok Sabha constituency

Constituency details
- Country: India
- Region: East India
- State: Jharkhand
- Assembly constituencies: Ichagarh; Silli; Khijri; Ranchi; Hatia; Kanke
- Established: 1952
- Reservation: None

Member of Parliament
- 18th Lok Sabha
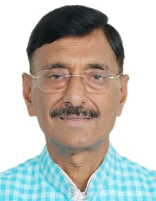
- Incumbent Sanjay Seth; Minister of State for Defence
- Party: BJP
- Alliance: NDA
- Elected year: 2024

Ranchi Lok Sabha constituency is one of the 14 Lok Sabha (parliamentary) constituencies in Jharkhand state in eastern India. This constituency covers parts of Seraikela Kharsawan and Ranchi districts.

== Assembly segments ==
Presently, Ranchi Lok Sabha constituency comprises the following six Vidhan Sabha (legislative assembly) segments:

#	Name	District	Member	Party	2024 Lead
50	Ichagarh	Seraikela Kharsawan	Sabita Mahato	JMM	BJP
61	Silli	Ranchi	Amit Mahto	JMM	BJP
62	Khijri (ST)	Ranchi	Rajesh Kachhap	INC	INC
63	Ranchi	Ranchi	C. P. Singh	BJP	BJP
64	Hatia	Ranchi	Navin Jaiswal	BJP	BJP
65	Kanke (SC)	Ranchi	Suresh Kumar Baitha	INC	BJP

== Members of Parliament ==
Year	Member	Party
1952	Abdul Ibrahim	Indian National Congress
1957	Minoo Masani	Independent
1962	Prashant Kumar Ghosh	Indian National Congress
1967	Prashant Kumar Ghosh	Indian National Congress
1971	Prashant Kumar Ghosh	Indian National Congress
1977	Ravindra Varma	Janata Party
1980	Shiv Prasad Sahu	Indian National Congress (I)
1984	Shiv Prasad Sahu	Indian National Congress
1989	Subodh Kant Sahay	Janata Dal
1991	Ram Tahal Choudhary	Bharatiya Janata Party
1996	Ram Tahal Choudhary	Bharatiya Janata Party
1998	Ram Tahal Choudhary	Bharatiya Janata Party
1999	Ram Tahal Choudhary	Bharatiya Janata Party
2004	Subodh Kant Sahay	Indian National Congress
2009	Subodh Kant Sahay	Indian National Congress
2014	Ram Tahal Choudhary	Bharatiya Janata Party
2019	Sanjay Seth	Bharatiya Janata Party
2024	Sanjay Seth	Bharatiya Janata Party

== Election results ==
Vote share of Winning candidates
2024	45.91%
2019	57.21%
2014	42.74%
2009	42.88%
2004	40.82%
1999	65.72%
1998	58.12%
1996	35.94%
1991	48.47%
1989	35.16%
1984	49.47%
1980	38.66%
1977	49.02%
1971	43.32%
1967	19.56%

=== 2024 ===
2024 Indian general election: Ranchi
Party	Candidate	Votes	%	±%
BJP	Sanjay Seth	664,732	45.91	▼11.30
INC	Yashaswini Sahay	5,44,220	37.59	▲3.29
Independent	Devendra Nath Mahto	1,32,647	9.16	▲9.16
NOTA	None of the above	8153	0.56	▲0.56
Majority		1,20,512	8.32	
Turnout		14,52,196	65.93	
BJP hold		Swing		

=== 2019 ===
2019 Indian general elections: Ranchi
Party	Candidate	Votes	%	±%
BJP	Sanjay Seth	706,828	57.21	+14.47
INC	Subodh Kant Sahay	4,23,802	34.3	+10.54
Independent	Ram Tahal Choudhary	29,597	2.4	0.0
BSP	Bidyadhar Prasad	8,798	0.71	
Majority		2,83,026	22.90	+3.92
Turnout		12,35,614	64.49	+0.81
BJP hold		Swing	+3.92	

=== 2014 ===
2014 Indian general elections: Ranchi
Party	Candidate	Votes	%	±%
BJP	Ram Tahal Choudhary	448,729	42.74	+1.70
INC	Subodh Kant Sahay	2,49,426	23.76	−19.12
AJSU	Sudesh Kumar Mahto	1,42,560	13.58	New
JVM(P)	Amitabh Choudhary	67,712	6.45	+2.09
AITC	Bandhu Tirkey	46,126	4.39	New
NOTA	None of the Above	6,900	0.66	New
Margin of victory		1,99,303	18.98	+17.14
Turnout		10,49,787	63.68	+19.13
BJP gain from INC		Swing	-0.14	

=== 2009 ===
2009 Indian general election: Ranchi
Party	Candidate	Votes	%	±%
INC	Subodh Kant Sahay	310,499	42.88	+2.06
BJP	Ram Tahal Choudhary	297,149	41.04	+2.44
JVM(P)	Akhtar Ansari	31,567	4.36	New
CPI(M)	Rajendra Singh Munda	21,996	3.04	−2.37
BSP	Mohammad Sarafuddin	10,994	1.52	+0.50
Majority		13,350	1.84	−0.38
Turnout		724,106	44.56	−5.88
INC hold		Swing	+2.06	

=== 2004 ===
2004 Indian general election: Ranchi
Party	Candidate	Votes	%	±%
INC	Subodh Kant Sahay	284,035	40.82	
BJP	Ram Tahal Choudhary	2,68,614	38.61	
Independent	Bandhu Tirky	52,380	7.53	
CPI(M)	Rajendra Singh Munda	37,688	5.42	
BSP	Samim Akhtar Kamal	7,116	1.02	
SP	Ali Raja Zaidi	5,179	0.74	
CPI(ML)L	Khudi Ram Munda	3,787	0.54	
Independent	8 Independent Candidates	29,937	4.30	
Others	4 Other Party Candidates	7,018	1.01	
Majority		15,421	2.21	
Turnout				
Swing to INC from BJP		Swing		

=== 1999 ===
1999 Indian general election: Ranchi
Party	Candidate	Votes	%	±%
BJP	Ram Tahal Choudhary	379,261	65.72	
INC	K. K. Tewari	1,38,084	23.93	
JMM	Prem Chand Mahto	39,021	6.76	
CPI(ML)L	Anant Prasad Gupta	6,306	1.09	
Independent	4 Independent Candidates	5,966	1.03	
Others	3 Other Party Candidates	8,452	1.46	
Majority		2,41,177	41.79	
Turnout		5,83,745	51.58	
BJP hold		Swing		

=== 1998 ===
1998 Indian general election: Ranchi
Party	Candidate	Votes	%	±%
BJP	Ramtahal Choudhary	398,022	58.12	
INC	Keshav Mahto Kamlesh	2,54,442	37.16	
AIFB	Napendra Krishna Mahto	9,038	1.32	
CPI(ML)L	Shubhendu Sen	5,050	0.74	
JMM	Bahadur Singh	4,606	0.67	
Independent	3 Independent Candidates	2,329	0.34	
Others	4 Other Party Candidates	11,308	1.65	
Majority		1,43,580	20.96	
Turnout				
BJP hold		Swing		

=== 1996 ===
1996 Indian general election: Ranchi
Party	Candidate	Votes	%	±%
BJP	Ram Tahal Choudhary	215,278	35.94	
INC	Keshwa Mahto Kamlesh	1,75,986	29.38	
JD	Ashok Kumar Singh	1,58,449	26.46	
JMM	Bhagwan Pd. Bhagat	11,504	1.92	
Independent	16 Independent Candidates	27,568	4.60	
Others	6 Other Party Candidates	10,140	1.69	
Majority		39,292	6.56	
Turnout				
BJP hold		Swing		

=== 1991 ===
1991 Indian general election: Ranchi
Party	Candidate	Votes	%	±%
BJP	Ram Tahal Choudhary	223,824	48.47	
JD	Awadhesh Kumar Singh	1,04,247	22.57	
INC	Sheo Prasad Sahu	79,863	17.29	
JP	Subodh Kant Sahay	19,975	4.33	
Independent	34 Independent Candidates	28,562	6.20	
Others	8 Other Party Candidates	5,332	1.17	
Majority		1,19,577	25.90	
Turnout				
Swing to BJP from JD		Swing		

=== 1989 ===
1989 Indian general election: Ranchi
Party	Candidate	Votes	%	±%
JD	Subodh Kant Sahay	163,919	35.16	
BJP	Ram Tahal Choudhary	1,48,933	31.94	
INC	Shiv Prasad Sahu	1,27,631	27.37	
Independent	10 Independent Candidates	13,327	2.87	
Others	6 Other Party Candidates	12,456	2.66	
Majority		14,986	3.22	
Turnout				
Swing to JD from INC		Swing		

=== 1984 ===
1984 Indian general election: Ranchi
Party	Candidate	Votes	%	±%
INC	Sheo Prasad Sahu	162,945	49.47	
BJP	Ram Tahal Chowdhary	54,384	16.51	
JP	Subodh Kant Sahay	51,178	15.54	
LKD	Roshan Lal Bhatia	18,494	5.61	
JMM	Nirmal Mahto	10,113	3.07	
FL	Nipendra Krishan Mahto	5,084	1.54	
Independent	17 Independent Candidates	27,179	8.27	
Majority		1,08,561	32.96	
Turnout				
INC hold		Swing		

=== 1980 ===
1980 Indian general election: Ranchi
Party	Candidate	Votes	%	±%
INC(I)	Shiva Prasad Sahu	106,506	38.66	
JP	Shiva Kumar Sinha	68,380	24.82	
JP(S)	Bhola Prasad Singh	26,679	9.68	
FL	Ghanshyam Mahto	26,025	9.45	
Independent	Ram Tahal Choudhry	24,398	8.86	
Jharkhand Party	David Bhanja	6,480	2.35	
Independent	Basant Lal	6,134	2.23	
INC(U)	Ram Karan Pal	1,273	0.46	
Independent	9 Independent Candidates	9,613	3.49	
Majority		38,126	13.84	
Turnout				
Swing to INC(I) from JP		Swing		

=== 1977 ===
1977 Indian general election: Ranchi
Party	Candidate	Votes	%	±%
JP	Ravindra Verma	130,938	49.02	
INC	Sheo Prasad Sahu	68,222	25.54	
Independent	Ghanshyam Mahto	22,721	8.51	
CPI(M)	Rajendra Singh	13,626	5.10	
Jharkhand Party	Birendra Kumar Pandey	2,640	0.99	
Independent	8 Independent Candidates	28,945	10.83	
Majority		62,716	23.48	
Turnout				
Swing to JP from INC		Swing		

=== 1971 ===
1971 Indian general election: Ranchi
Party	Candidate	Votes	%	±%
INC	Prashant Kumar Ghosh	79,497	43.32	
ABJS	Rudra Pratap Sarangi	63,077	34.37	
Independent	Rameshwar Mahto	13,242	7.22	
FL	Ghanshyam Mahto	12,373	6.74	
Jharkhand Party	Kamini Kant Shriwastawa	4,398	2.40	
Independent	5 Independent Candidates	7,909	4.30	
Others	2 Other Party Candidates	3,007	1.64	
Majority		16,420	8.95	
Turnout		1,89,739	34.70	
INC hold		Swing		

=== 1967 ===
1967 Indian general election: Ranchi
Party	Candidate	Votes	%	±%
INC	P. K. Ghosh	33,257	19.56	
ABJS	A. N. S. Sinha	29,090	17.11	
Independent	D. Bagchi	22,854	13.44	
Independent	R. S. Singh	19,320	11.36	
Independent	A. Shadeo	17,926	10.54	
Independent	M. Ahmed	15,170	8.92	
SSP	R. Mahto	10,076	5.93	
SWA	D. Sarawagi	9,756	5.74	
Independent	M. H. B. Munda	7,317	4.30	
Independent	D. Rajgarhiya	5,242	3.08	
Majority		4,167	2.45	
Turnout		1,81,946	39.13	
INC hold		Swing		

== See also ==
- Ranchi district
- List of constituencies of the Lok Sabha
