= Shiv Prasad Sahu =

Indian businessman and politician (1934–2001)

Member of Parliament, Lok Sabha
- In office 1989–1984
- Preceded by: Ravindra Varma
- Constituency: Ranchi, Bihar
- In office 1980–1984
- Succeeded by: Subodh Kant Sahay
- Constituency: Ranchi, Bihar

Personal details
- Born: Shiv Prasad Sahu; 7 January 1934 Lohardaga, Bihar, British India (Now Jharkhand, India)
- Died: 23 January 2001 (aged 67)
- Party: Indian National Congress
- Spouse: Shefali Sahu (m. 1953)
- Parent: Baldeo Sahu (father)
- Relatives: Gopal Sahu (brother); Dhiraj Prasad Sahu(brother)
- Education: Beasant Theosophical School, Banaras

Shiv Prasad Sahu (7 January 1934 - 23 January 2001) was an Indian businessman and politician. He was a Member of Parliament, representing Ranchi, Bihar twice in the Lok Sabha the lower house of India's Parliament as a member of the Indian National Congress.

He was general secretary of Chhota Nagpur Bauxite Workers' Union, Ranchi District Bauxite and China Clay Mines Employees Union. He was Chairman of several colleges, schools and Chairman of Lohardaga Municipality. He died on 23 January 2001.
