= Ravindra Varma =

Indian politician

G. Ravindra Varma

Union Minister of Labour
- In office 26 March 1977 - 28 July 1979
- Preceded by: K. V. Raghunatha Reddy
- Succeeded by: Fazlur Rahman

Union Minister of Parliamentary Affairs
- In office 26 March 1977 - 28 July 1979
- Preceded by: Kotha Raghuramaiah
- Succeeded by: K. Gopal

Member of Lok Sabha
- In office 1980-1985
- Preceded by: Mrinal Gore
- Succeeded by: Anoopchand Shah
- Constituency: Mumbai North
- In office 1977-1980
- Preceded by: Prashant Kumar Ghosh
- Succeeded by: Shiv Prasad Sahu
- Constituency: Ranchi
- In office 1962-1967
- Preceded by: P. K. Vasudevan Nair
- Succeeded by: R. Achuthan
- Constituency: Thiruvalla (Present Mavelikara)

Personal details
- Born: 9 April 1925 Mavelikkara
- Died: 10 October 2006 (aged 81) New Delhi, India

Ravindra Varma (9 April 1925 – 10 October 2006) was an Indian politician who served as the Minister for Labour and Parliamentary Affairs in the Morarji Desai Ministry in India from 1977 to 1979.

== Politics ==
He entered active politics in 1942. He plunged into the vortex of the freedom struggle while studying at the Christian College in Chennai. He was founder-president of the Indian Student Congress and the World Youth Assembly.

He was first elected to the Lok Sabha from Thiruvalla in Kerala in 1962 on a Congress ticket. When Congress split in 1969, he stayed on as the General Secretary of Congress (Organisation) founding the organization along with Morarji Desai, Nijalingappa and Kamaraj.

He was politically active in resisting the Emergency (1975–77) and organized underground cells. He was next elected in 1977 from Ranchi in Bihar as a Janata Party candidate. He represented Mumbai North in 7th Lok Sabha from 1980 to 1985.

He had been the Chairman of the Gandhi Peace Foundation since the death of its founder-chairman Diwakar in 1989. He was the founder-chairman of the Gandhi Vichar Parishad at Wardha. He was also Chancellor of the Gujarat Vidyapeeth.

== Personal life ==
Varma belonged to the royal family in Mavelikkara in southern Kerala. He is the Grandson of Famous Sanskrit Scholar and Poet A. R. Raja Raja Varma, he known as "Kerala Panini". He died in 2006, aged 81. He is survived by his younger son Harshvardhan Varma. His elder son Goutham and wife Mangala died within a span of a few months in 2015.
