= Subodh Kant Sahay =

Indian politician (born 1951)

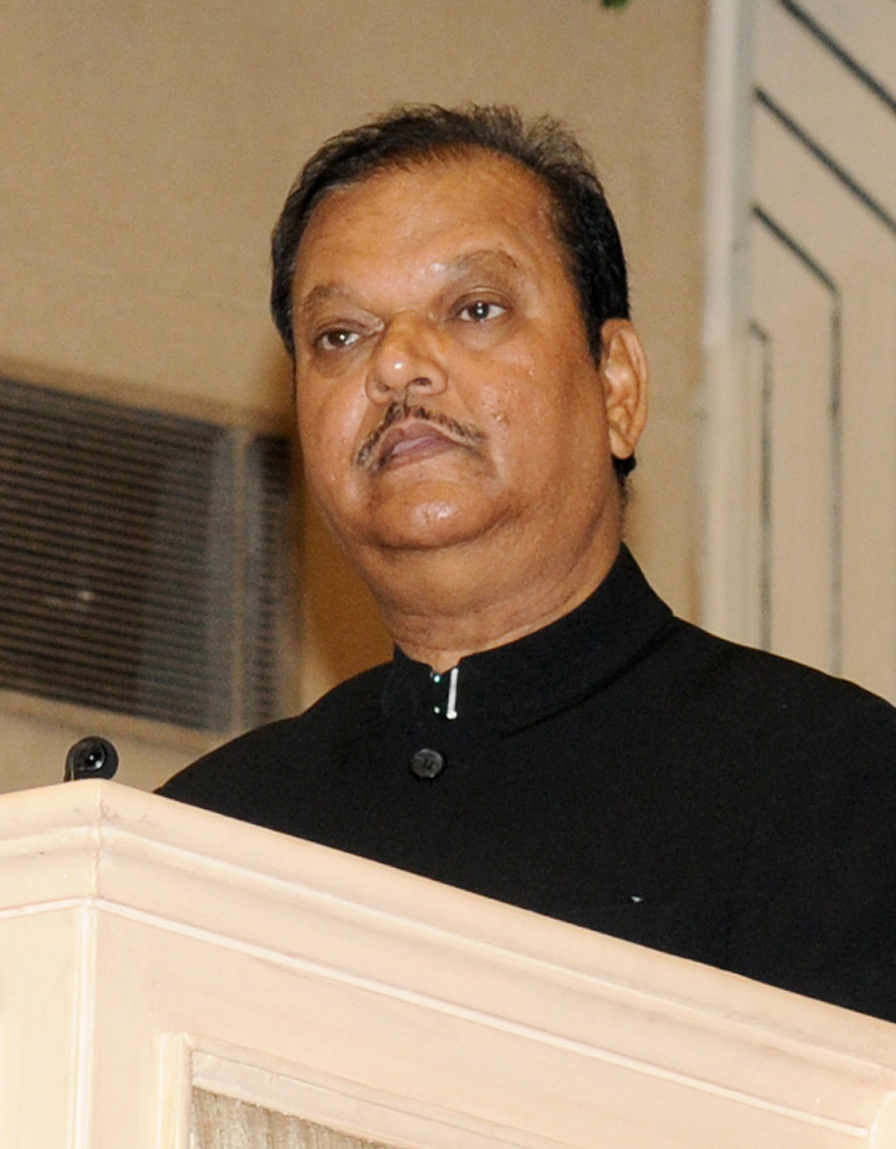
- Subodh Kant Sahay as Minister of Tourism in 2012

Minister of Tourism
- In office 19 January 2011 — 28 October 2012
- Prime Minister: Manmohan Singh
- Preceded by: Selja Kumari
- Succeeded by: Chiranjeevi (As MoS, Independent Charge)

Minister of Food Processing Industries
- In office 23 May 2009 — 19 January 2011
- Prime Minister: Manmohan Singh
- Preceded by: Himself (as MoS, Independent Charge)
- Succeeded by: Sharad Pawar

Minister of State (independent charge), Ministry of Food Processing Industries
- In office 22 May 2004 — 23 May 2009
- Prime Minister: Manmohan Singh
- Preceded by: Rajnath Singh (as Minister)
- Succeeded by: Himself (as Minister)

Member of Parliament, Lok Sabha
- In office 16 May 2004 — 17 May 2014
- Preceded by: Ram Tahal Choudhary
- Succeeded by: Ram Tahal Choudhary
- Constituency: Ranchi
- In office November 1989 — June 1991
- Preceded by: Shiv Prasad Sahu
- Succeeded by: Ram Tahal Choudhary

Personal details
- Born: 11 June 1951 (age 75) Latehar, Bihar, India
- Party: Indian National Congress (1989–present)
- Other political affiliations: Janata Dal (till 1989)
- Spouse: Rekha Sahay
- Children: Yashashwini Sahay
- As of 25 September, 2006

Subodh Kant Sahay (Hindi: सुबोध कांत सहाय; born 11 June 1951) is an Indian politician. He served as three term MP (Lok Sabha) of India. He represented the Ranchi constituency of Jharkhand and is a member of the Indian National Congress (INC) political party. He had been holding important portfolios. He was the Cabinet Minister for Tourism until 28 Oct 2012. He is referred as one of the closest to former Prime Minister Dr. Manmohan Singh and former UPA Chairperson Smt. Sonia Gandhi. According to sources, Sonia Gandhi knew him for his truth and hard work. He was the Minister for Home in V.P. Singh government. Sahay was asked to resign in 2012 from his ministerial post by Manmohan Singh in light of favoring his brother in allocation of coal mine blocks in the infamous Coal Scam.

== Early life ==
Subodh Kant Sahay was born on 11 June 1951 in a religious Chitraguptavanshi Ambastha Kayastha family in Latehar, Bihar (now Jharkhand) to Shri. Brijdeo Sahay and Smt. Indrani Devi. He did his B.Sc. and LL.B. at A N College, Patna and Ranchi University. He has been involved in social and welfare activities since student days and organized several National and State Level programs for mobilization of youth, working for the upliftment of the downtrodden, deprived and minority communities.

== Political career ==
Subodh Kant Sahay was actively involved in the Non-Aligned Student and Youth Organization (NASYO). He participated in Jai Prakash Movement of 70s and was groomed under the tutelage of Janta party stalwarts like Chandrashekhar Singh, Satyendra Narayan Sinha & Thakur Prasad. Upon behest of Bihar Janta party president Sinha, he was placed as a candidate from Hatia, a seat he won and made his electoral debut in assembly. He was Member of Preparatory Committee, World Youth Festival; General Secretary, (i) Yuva Janata for three years; (ii) Janata Party for two years; (iii) Janata Dal for 6 months; Working President Yuva Janta for two years; President Yuva Janata for three years. He started his political career from Hatia, Ranchi.

He had been re-elected as the MP from Ranchi again in the elections in May 2009. Congress had managed to win only one seat from Ranchi out of 14 seats and only 3 seats from Bihar out of 40 seats. Sahay served as Minister of State (Independent Charge) for Food Processing Industries in the First Manmohan Singh Cabinet from 2004 to 2009. On the second Congress victory in the 2009 elections which saw Manmohan Singh continue as Prime Minister, Sahay was elevated to Cabinet rank holding the same Food Processing Industries portfolio.

During the ministry shuffle in January 2011 he was given Cabinet Minister for Ministry of Tourism (India).

== Personal life ==
Subodh Kant Sahay is married to Rekha Sahay, who is a famous theatre personality. They have a daughter named Yashaswini Sahay.

== Position held ==
- 1978-1989 Speaker, Bihar Legislative Assembly (three terms)
- President, Public Accounts Committee, Bihar Legislative Assembly (four years)
- President, Committee of Privileges, Bihar Legislative Assembly (two years)
- Vice President, Library Committee, Bihar Legislative Assembly (four years)
- 1989 Elected to 9th Lok Sabha
- President, Committee on Petitions, Bihar Legislative Assembly (three years)
- April 1990 – November 1990 Union Minister, Home Affairs, Govt. of India
- November 1990 – June 1991 Union Minister of State (Independent Charge), Information & Broadcasting & Home Affairs, Govt. of India
- 2004 Re-elected to 14th Lok Sabha (2nd term)
- 2004 Union Minister of State (Independent Charge), Food & Food Processing Industries
- 2006 Cabinet Minister, Food Processing
- 2011 Cabinet Minister, Ministry of Tourism (India)
- 2011 to 28 Oct 2012: Union Minister for Tourism.

Political offices
Unknown	Minister of Food Processing Industries unknown	Incumbent
