= DRDO light tank =

Tracked amphibious light tank

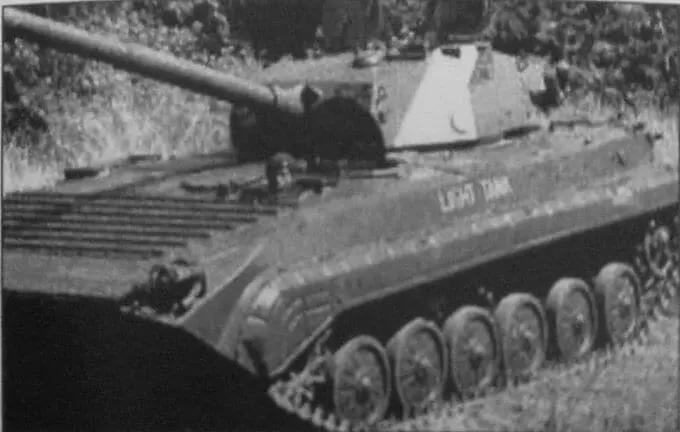
DRDO Light Tank BMP-1 variant

The DRDO light tank or BMP-1 light tank is a tracked amphibious light tank developed in India by DRDO to carry high-caliber weapons without sacrificing mobility. It is based on the "Sarath" chassis, a licensed variant of the Soviet BMP-1. It was built by the Ordnance Factory Medak with a French GIAT TS-90 turret and 105 mm gun. The project was ultimately shelved due to lack of interest from the army.

== Development ==
The "Design and Development of Light Tank on BMP-I" project approved in 1983 was intended to be completed in 1986. It never reached completion but continued in production and trials until 1996 at a total cost of ₹4.53 crore (₹2.91 through foreign exchange), well beyond its estimated ₹2.54 crore. The army, which had inspired the project with a 1976 GSQR, determined in July 1985 that a light tank on BMP was not needed. However, they continued to provide feedback leading in 1988 to 105mm turrets being implemented rather than the planned 90mm turrets. In May 1993, a year after the project left the Combat Vehicles Research and Development Establishment, Avadi, to come under the governance of Vehicle Research and Development Establishment, Ahmednagar, the Army again announced that the light tank was unnecessary. Nevertheless, firing trials continued until August 1996, despite the February 1994 recommendation of the scientific advisor to the Defence Minister to close the project.

== Capabilities ==
- Crew: 3 men for turret
- Main Gun: 105 mm semi-automatic with muzzle brake
- Turret: Aluminium alloy with 12.7 AP protection level
- Ammunition: APFSDS, APDS, HESH
- Fire Control System (FCS): COTAC semi-automatic
- Stowing capacity: Main gun–42 rounds
  - (turret–10 rounds)
  - (ammunition compartment–32 rounds)
- Accurate ranging by Laser Range Finder (LRF)
- Low-light level TV for commander and gunner
- Panoramic sight for Commander
- Amphibious capabilities

== See also ==
- Zorawar LT - another light tank project of India manufactured in 2024
- Abhay IFV
