= Sanjay Seth (Jharkhand politician) =

Indian politician (born 1959)

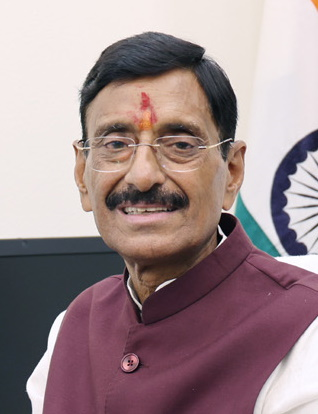

Minister of State for Defence
- Incumbent
- Assumed office 9 June 2024
- Prime Minister: Narendra Modi
- Minister: Rajnath Singh
- Preceded by: Ajay Bhatt

Member of Parliament, Lok Sabha
- Incumbent
- Assumed office 23 May 2019
- Preceded by: Ram Tahal Choudhary
- Constituency: Ranchi

Personal details
- Born: 25 August 1959 (age 67)
- Party: Bharatiya Janata Party
- Spouse: Smt. Neeta Seth
- Children: Aishwar Seth (son) Dipti Seth (daughter)
- Education: Ranchi University
- Profession: Politician

Sanjay Seth (born 25 August 1959; Hindi pronunciation: [sən.d͡ʒəj seːʈʰ]) is an Indian politician from Bharatiya Janata Party who serves as the Minister of State for Defence in the Modi Government. He is a Member of Parliament, Lok Sabha from Ranchi, Jharkhand since 2019.

== Positions held ==
Sanjay Seth has held a range of positions throughout his career. In June 2024, he was elected to the 18th Lok Sabha and currently serves as the Union Minister of State in the Ministry of Defence since June 2024. He has been a Member of the Committee on Subordinate Legislation since October 9, 2019, and a Member of the Standing Committee on Communications and Information Technology since September 13, 2019. Additionally, since July 31, 2019, he has served as a Member of the Committee on Welfare of Other Backward Classes.

Previously, Sanjay Seth was elected to the 17th Lok Sabha in May 2019. He also held the position of Chairman of the Jharkhand State Khadi and Village Industries Board from 2016 to 2019. His early career involved significant involvement in banking and industry, having served as a Member of the Local Board of the State Bank of India for two terms from 1999 to 2005, and as President of the Federation of Jharkhand Chamber of Commerce and Industries in 1999-2000.

== Personal life ==
He was born into a Punjabi family and completed his education from Ranchi University. He later married Neeta Seth and has one son, Aishwar Seth who is married to Gargi Malkani, a renowned dancer, and a daughter Dipti Seth.

== See also ==
- Third Modi ministry
