= 2024 Jharkhand Legislative Assembly election =

- 13–20 November 2024

All 81 seats in the Jharkhand Legislative Assembly 41 seats needed for a majority
- Opinion polls
- Turnout: 68.34% (▲2.96 pp)
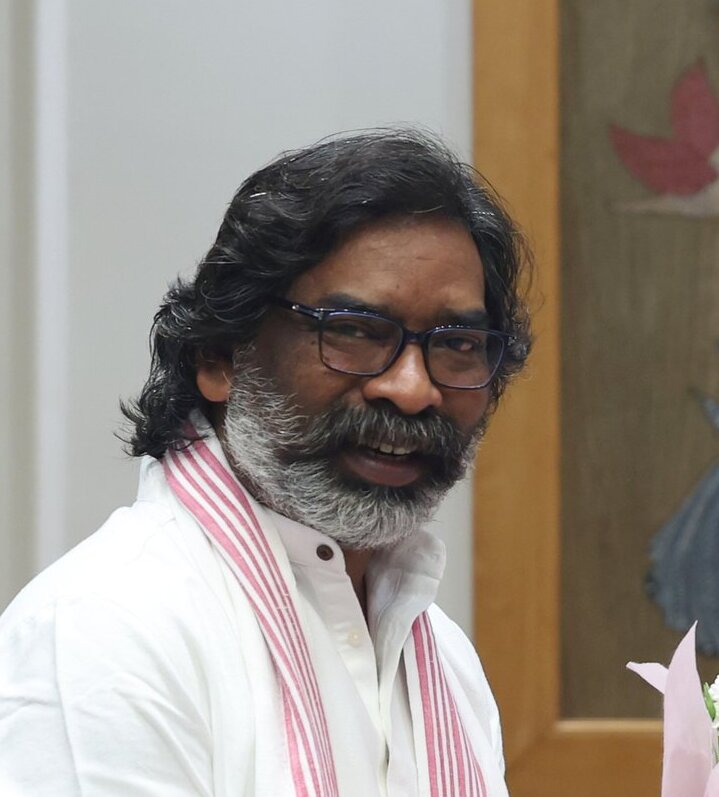

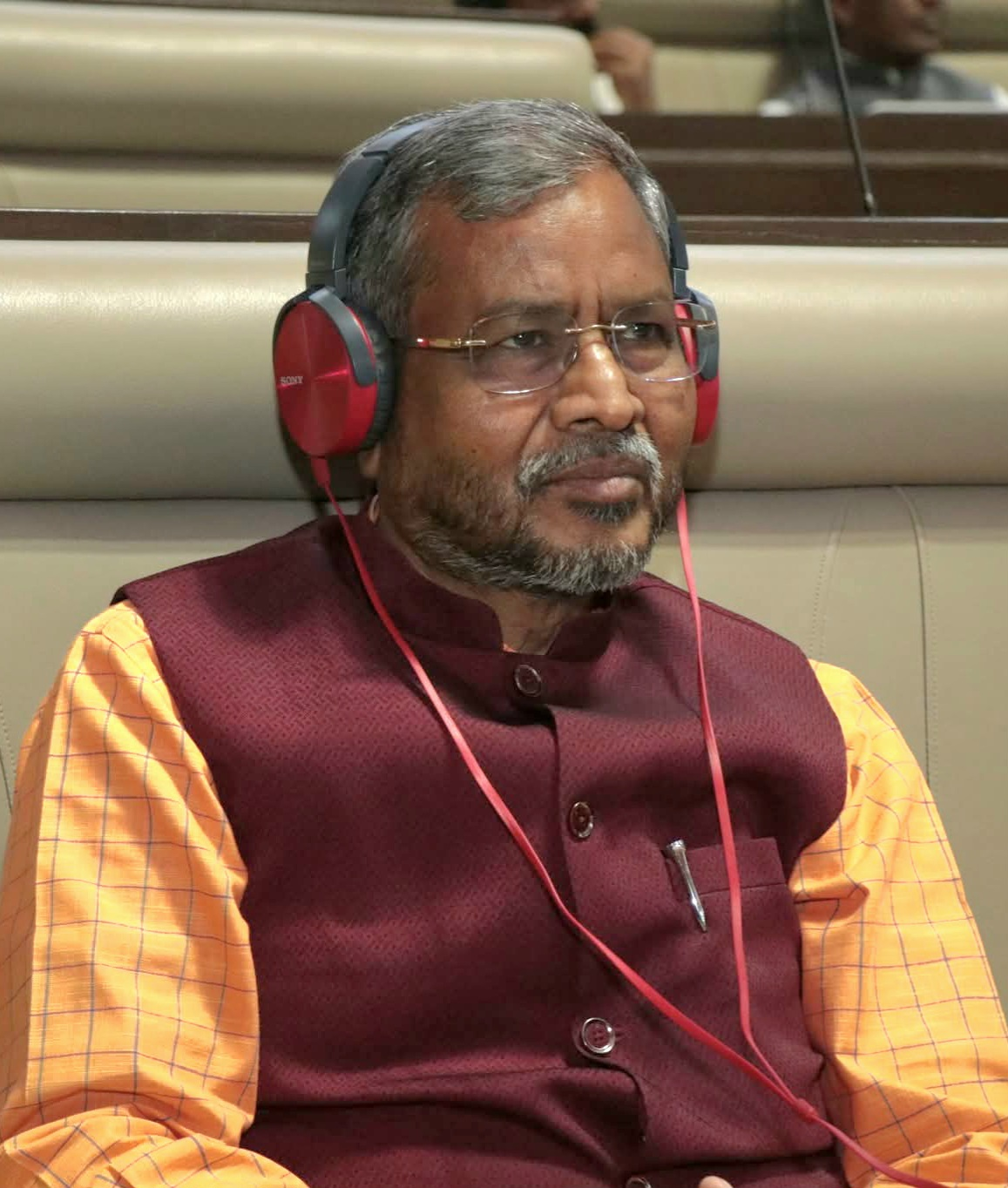

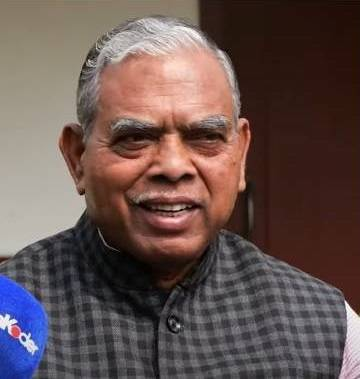
| | Majority party | Minority party | Third party |
|---|---|---|---|
| Leader | Hemant Soren | Babulal Marandi | Keshav Mahto Kamlesh |
| Party | JMM | BJP | INC |
| Alliance | MGB | NDA | MGB |
| Leader since | 2024 | 2020 | 2024 |
| Leader's seat | Barhait (won) | Dhanwar (won) | Did not contest |
| Last election | 18.72%, 30 seats | 33.37%, 25 seats | 13.88%, 16 seats |
| Seats won | 34 | 21 | 16 |
| Seat change | ▲4 | ▼4 | Steady |
| Popular vote | 4,183,281 | 5,921,474 | 2,776,805 |
| Percentage | 23.44% | 33.18% | 15.56% |
| Swing | ▲4.72 pp | ▼0.19 pp | ▲1.68 pp |
| Alliance seats | 56 | 24 | 56 |
| Seat change | ▲8 | ▼3 | ▲8 |
- Constituencies of the Jharkhand Legislative Assembly

Chief Minister before election
Hemant Soren
JMM
Chief Minister after election
Hemant Soren
JMM

The 2024 Jharkhand Legislative Assembly election was held in three phases from 13 to 20 November 2024 to elect all 81 members of the Jharkhand Legislative Assembly. The counting of votes was done on 24 November 2024. The Jharkhand Mukti Morcha won 34 seats, securing 23.44% of the popular vote and its alliance, Mahagathbandhan (INDIA Bloc) including the Congress, CPI(ML)L and RJD won 56 seats, securing 44.37% of the popular vote. The Bharatiya Janata Party won 21 seats, securing 33.18% of the popular vote and its alliance, NDA won 24 seats, securing 38.14% of the popular vote.

== Background ==
The tenure of 5th Jharkhand Assembly was scheduled to end on 5 January 2025. The previous assembly elections were held in November–December 2019. The coalition of Jharkhand Mukti Morcha, Indian National Congress and Rashtriya Janata Dal formed the state government, with Hemant Soren becoming the Chief Minister.

== Schedule ==
| Poll event | Phase | |
| Poll event | I | II |
|---|---|---|
| Notification date | 18 October | 22 October |
| Last date for filing nomination | 25 October 2024 | 29 October 2024 |
| Scrutiny of nomination | 28 October | 30 October |
| Last date for withdrawal of nomination | 30 October | 1 November |
| Date of poll | 13 November | 20 November |
| Date of counting of votes | 23 November | |
| No. of constituencies | 43 | 38 |

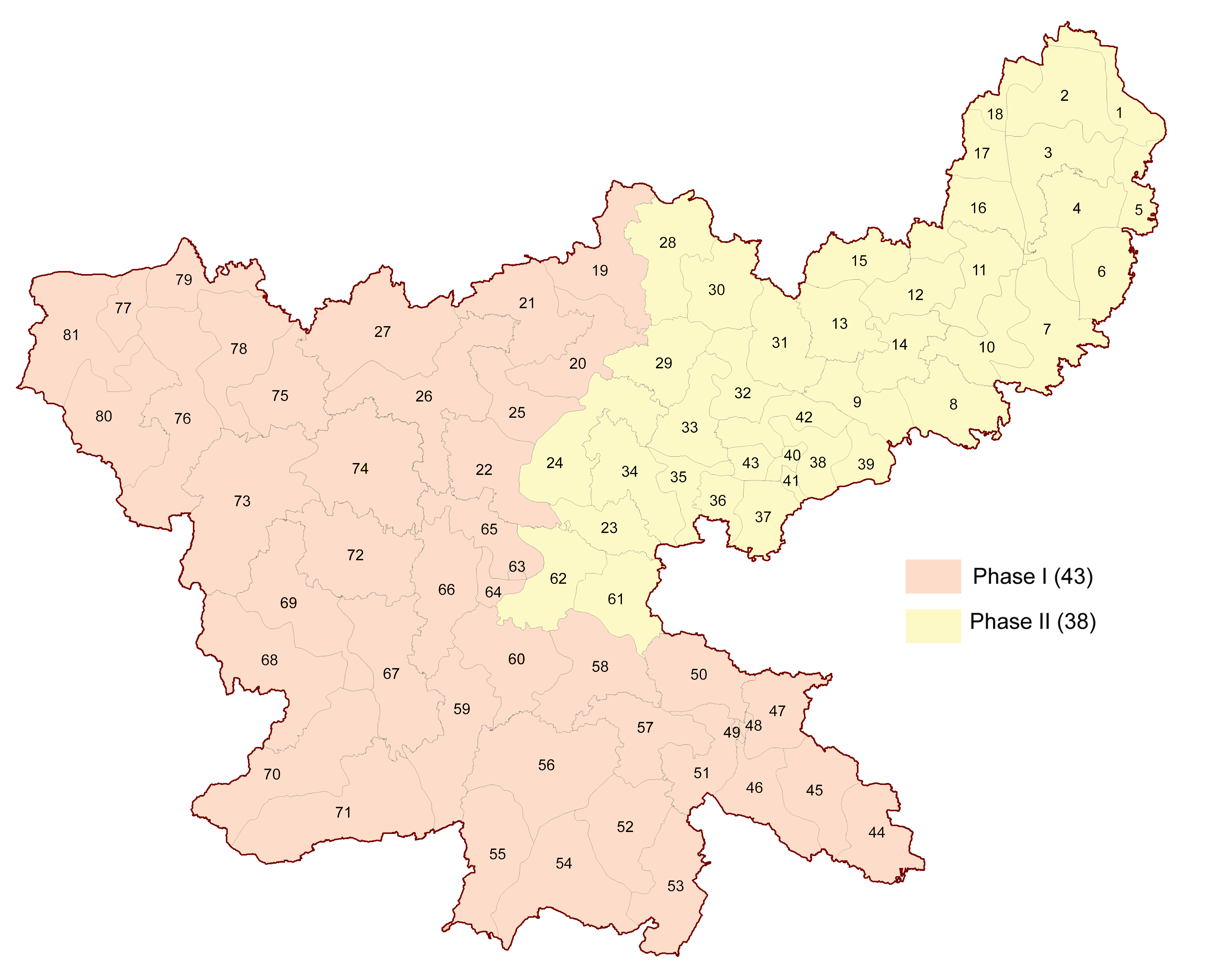
Jharkhand Assembly Phase I and II (2024 Legislative Assembly Election)

== Issues ==
=== Polarisation campaign ===
The Bharatiya Janata Party's campaign focused on religious polarisation and ran a high decibel campaign on claims of "infiltration" by Bangladeshis. The party pushed the narratives of love jihad and land jihad with the claim that "infiltrators" were marrying tribal women and taking over tribal lands causing fall in the tribal population. The campaign characterised Muslims as infiltrators.

One video advertisement depicted a "horde of Muslims" including children moving into the house of a Middle-class family sporting a JMM flag was pulled down later by the ECI upon receiving complaints but after it had been widely circulated on social media. The video advertisement continued to be available on the BJP Jharkhand's verified Whatsapp channel and pushed by Twitter accounts which regularly engage in disinformation.

According to ground reports, even people who said they would vote BJP were skeptical of these claims, and it had caused apprehensions against the campaign particularly among tribals in the Kolhan region for reasons of impact on communal amity and being cast as part of the broader Hindu community. These claims were described as a bogey by civil society organisations which attempted to counter the narrative on the ground by bringing data to people that the fall in tribal population is not large and caused by factors like out-of-state migration of tribals for jobs.

=== Tribal Land Issues ===
Land rights of tribals continued to remain an core issue for the election. The previous BJP government led by Chief Minister Raghubar Das had introduced the policy of "land banks" in 2016 after failing to dilute the SPT and CNT Acts due to protests by tribals in which one person was killed in police firing. The land banks policy combined with the dilution of protections for tribals in the LARR Act by the Raghubar Das government in 2013 had led to increasing occurrences of takeover of tribal land by corporations and contractors over the years.

The BJP moved away from its usual strategy of pitting Christian and non-Christian tribals and instead to appeal to tribals attempted to portray Muslims as the "diku", a term generally used by tribals to refer to moneylenders, traders and administrators coming from outside the state and belonging to dominant caste groups. The party relied on Arjun Munda and Madhu Koda in tribal areas but their leaders faced significant pressure over the land issue.

Questions were also raised against the incumbent JMM over the issue. JMM had near the end introduced a bill to repeal the policy after urging from their coalition partner CPI(ML)L but the Governor had not given his assent to it. JMM campaigned on a platform of tribal culture, land and identity including a pledge to implement land registers to determine domicile status based on a 1932 survey.

=== Populist Schemes ===
Election campaigns have focused heavily on populist welfare schemes. The JMM government’s Mukhyamantri Maiya Samman Yojana, which provides Rs 1,000 per month to women, was countered by the BJP's Gogo-Didi Yojana, promising Rs 2,100. In response, the JMM increased its scheme’s payout to Rs 2,500, effective December 2024. The BJP has also pledged subsidized LPG cylinders, monthly stipends for unemployed graduates and postgraduates, and extensive job creation programs.

=== State vs. Centre on Fund Allocation ===
The JMM has accused the BJP-led Central government of withholding funds owed to the state, with Chief Minister Hemant Soren demanding the release of Rs 1.36 trillion in dues from coal companies. Soren has emphasized that the demand is for rightful state funds, not a special grant.

=== Corruption Allegations ===
Corruption charges have taken center stage, with BJP leaders highlighting Soren’s alleged involvement in a land-related money laundering case. The JMM has countered these accusations by asserting that the BJP is targeting Soren unfairly because he is a tribal leader.

== Voting ==
In the first phase of voting on 13 November 2024, electorates exercised their franchise across 43 Assembly constituencies spread over 15 districts contested by 638 candidates. The overall voting percentage was 66.65%. While 69.04% of women voters came out to press the EVM button, the percentage for men was 64.27% while just 31.02% of the third gender voted. In 37 of the 43 constituencies that voted in the first phase, the female voters had a higher turnout than males.

The maximum voting percentage was recorded in the Kharsawan Assembly with 77.32%. The next two seats were Baharagora (76.15%) and Lohardaga (73.21%). However, Ranchi saw the lowest polling with just 51.5% of the electorate participating in the election process.

The second phase on 20 November saw voting taking place in 38 Assembly seats. The number of candidates is 528. The polling percentage in 38 constituencies of Jharkhand was 68.45%.

== Parties and alliances ==
=== Mahagathbandhan (INDIA Bloc) ===
Mahagathbandhan (INDIA Bloc)

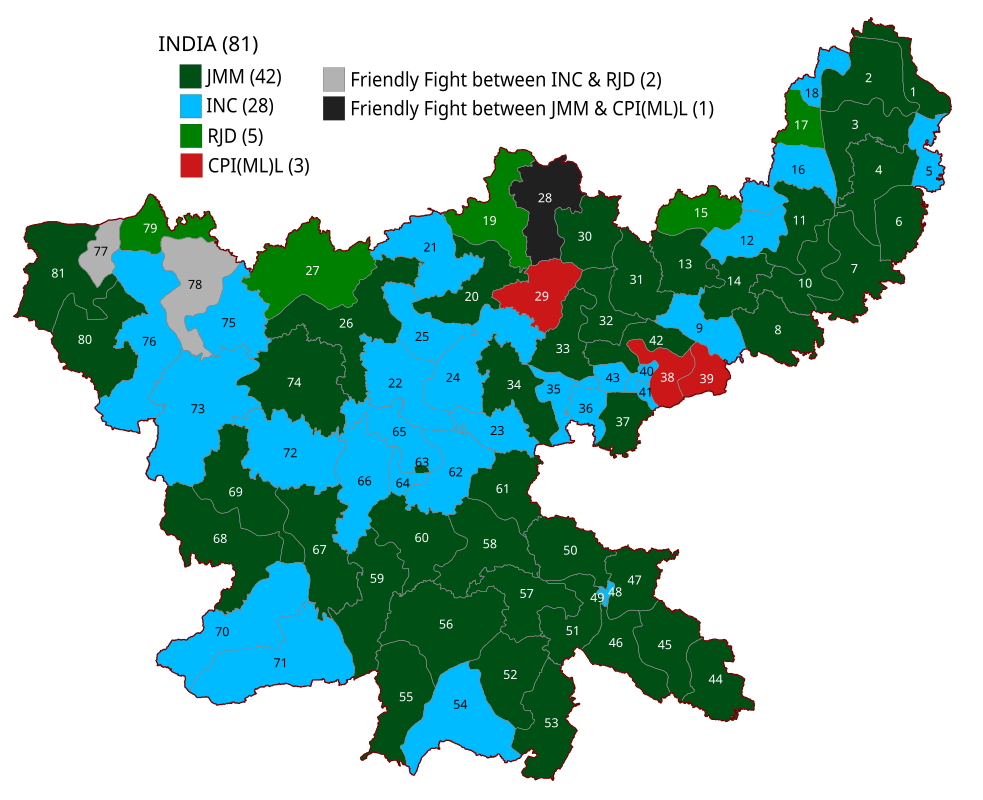
Seat sharing of Mahagathbandhan for 2024 Jharkhand Assembly election

| Party | Flag | Symbol | Leader | Seats contested |
|---|---|---|---|---|
| Jharkhand Mukti Morcha | | | Hemant Soren | 43 (Note: JMM and CPI(ML)L had friendly contest on Dhanwar constituency.) |
| Indian National Congress | | | Rameshwar Oraon | 30 (Note: Congress and RJD had friendly contests on Chhatarpur and Bishrampur constituencies.) |
| Rashtriya Janata Dal | | | Ram Kumar | 7 |
| Communist Party of India (Marxist–Leninist) Liberation | | | Manoj Bhakt | 4 |

=== National Democratic Alliance ===
National Democratic Alliance

Seat sharing of NDA

| Party | Flag | Symbol | Leader | Seats contested |
|---|---|---|---|---|
| Bharatiya Janata Party | | | Babulal Marandi | 68 |
| All Jharkhand Students Union | | | Sudesh Mahto | 10 |
| Janata Dal (United) | | | Khiru Mahto | 2 |
| Lok Janshakti Party (Ram Vilas) | | | Birendra Prasad Pradhan | 1 |

=== Others ===
| Party | Flag | Symbol | Leader | Seats contested |
|---|---|---|---|---|
| Bahujan Samaj Party | | | Mayawati | 81 |
| Jharkhand Loktantrik Krantikari Morcha | | | Jairam Kumar Mahato | 68 |
| Jharkhand Party | | | Ajit Kumar | 16 |
| Communist Party of India | | | Mahendra Pathak | 15 |
| Azad Samaj Party (Kanshi Ram) | | | Chandrashekhar Azad | 14 |
| Socialist Unity Centre of India (Communist) | | | Robin Samajpati | 14 |
| Samajwadi Party | | | Akhilesh Yadav | 12 |
| Communist Party of India (Marxist) | | | Prakash Viplav | 9 |
| Jharkhand People's Party | | | Surya Singh Besra | 8 |
| All India Forward Bloc | | | Arun Mondal | 7 |
| All India Majlis-e-Ittehadul Muslimeen | | | N/A | 7 |
| Nationalist Congress Party | | | N/A | 24 |
| Bharat Adivasi Party | | | Prem Shankar Shahi Munda | 19 |
| Rashtriya Jankranti Morcha | | | Abdul Mobin Rizvi | 5 |

== Candidates ==
| Voting Date | District | Constituency | | | | | |
| Voting Date | District | Constituency | | MGB | | NDA | |
| 20 November 2024 | Sahebganj | 1 | Rajmahal | JMM | M.T. Raja | BJP | Anant Kumar Ojha |
| 20 November 2024 | Sahebganj | 2 | Borio (ST) | JMM | Dhananjay Soren | BJP | Lobin Hembrom |
| 20 November 2024 | Sahebganj | 3 | Barhait (ST) | JMM | Hemant Soren | BJP | Gamliyel Hembrom |
| 20 November 2024 | Pakur | 4 | Litipara (ST) | JMM | Hemlal Murmu | BJP | Babudhan Murmu |
| 20 November 2024 | Pakur | 5 | Pakur | INC | Nishat Alam | AJSU | Azhar Islam |
| 20 November 2024 | Pakur | 6 | Maheshpur (ST) | JMM | Stephen Marandi | BJP | Navneet Hembrom |
| 20 November 2024 | Dumka | 7 | Sikaripara (ST) | JMM | Alok Soren | BJP | Paritosh Soren |
| 20 November 2024 | Jamtara | 8 | Nala | JMM | Rabindra Nath Mahato | BJP | Madhav Chandra Mahto |
| 20 November 2024 | Jamtara | 9 | Jamtara | INC | Irfan Ansari | BJP | Sita Soren |
| 20 November 2024 | Dumka | 10 | Dumka (ST) | JMM | Basant Soren | BJP | Sunil Soren |
| 20 November 2024 | Dumka | 11 | Jama (ST) | JMM | Louis Marandi | BJP | Suresh Murmu |
| 20 November 2024 | Dumka | 12 | Jarmundi | INC | Badal Patralekh | BJP | Devendra Kunwar |
| 20 November 2024 | Deoghar | 13 | Madhupur | JMM | Hafizul Hasan | BJP | Ganga Narayan Singh |
| 20 November 2024 | Deoghar | 14 | Sarath | JMM | Uday Shankar Singh | BJP | Randhir Kumar Singh |
| 20 November 2024 | Deoghar | 15 | Deoghar (SC) | RJD | Suresh Paswan | BJP | Narayan Das |
| 20 November 2024 | Godda | 16 | Poreyahat | INC | Pradeep Yadav | BJP | Devendra Nath Singh |
| 20 November 2024 | Godda | 17 | Godda | RJD | Sanjay Prasad Yadav | BJP | Amit Kumar Mandal |
| 20 November 2024 | Godda | 18 | Mahagama | INC | Dipika Pandey Singh | BJP | Ashok Kumar Bhagat |
| 13 November 2024 | Kodarma | 19 | Kodarma | RJD | Subhash Yadav | BJP | Dr. Neera Yadav |
| 13 November 2024 | Hazaribagh | 20 | Barkatha | JMM | Janki Yadav | BJP | Amit Kumar Yadav |
| 13 November 2024 | Hazaribagh | 21 | Barhi | INC | Arun Sahu | BJP | Manoj Yadav |
| 13 November 2024 | Ramgarh | 22 | Barkagaon | INC | Amba Prasad Sahu | BJP | Roshan Lal Choudhary |
| 20 November 2024 | Ramgarh | 23 | Ramgarh | INC | Mamta Devi | AJSU | Sunita Choudhary |
| 20 November 2024 | Hazaribagh | 24 | Mandu | INC | Jai Prakash Patel | AJSU | Nirmal Mahto |
| 13 November 2024 | Hazaribagh | 25 | Hazaribagh | INC | Munna Singh | BJP | Pradip Prasad |
| 13 November 2024 | Chatra | 26 | Simaria (SC) | JMM | Manoj Chandra | BJP | Ujjwal Das |
| 13 November 2024 | Chatra | 27 | Chatra (SC) | RJD | Rashmi Prakash | LJP(RV) | Janardan Paswan |
| 20 November 2024 | Giridih | 28 | Dhanwar | CPI(ML)L | Raj Kumar Yadav | BJP | Babulal Marandi |
| 20 November 2024 | Giridih | 28 | Dhanwar | JMM | Nizamuddin Ansari | BJP | Babulal Marandi |
| 20 November 2024 | Giridih | 29 | Bagodar | CPI(ML)L | Vinod Kumar Singh | BJP | Nagendra Mahto |
| 20 November 2024 | Giridih | 30 | Jamua (SC) | JMM | Kedar Hazra | BJP | Manju Devi |
| 20 November 2024 | Giridih | 31 | Gandey | JMM | Kalpana Soren | BJP | Muniya Devi |
| 20 November 2024 | Giridih | 32 | Giridih | JMM | Sudivya Kumar | BJP | Nirbhay Kumar Shahabadi |
| 20 November 2024 | Giridih | 33 | Dumri | JMM | Baby Devi | AJSU | Yashoda Devi |
| 20 November 2024 | Bokaro | 34 | Gomia | JMM | Yogendra Prasad | AJSU | Lambodar Mahto |
| 20 November 2024 | Bokaro | 35 | Bermo | INC | Kumar Jaimangal | BJP | Ravindra Kumar Pandey |
| 20 November 2024 | Bokaro | 36 | Bokaro | INC | Shweta Singh | BJP | Biranchi Narayan |
| 20 November 2024 | Bokaro | 37 | Chandankiyari (SC) | JMM | Uma Kant Rajak | BJP | Amar Kumar Bauri |
| 20 November 2024 | Dhanbad | 38 | Sindri | CPI(ML)L | Bablu Mahato | BJP | Tara Devi |
| 20 November 2024 | Dhanbad | 39 | Nirsa | CPI(ML)L | Arup Chatterjee | BJP | Aparna Sengupta |
| 20 November 2024 | Dhanbad | 40 | Dhanbad | INC | Ajay Dubey | BJP | Raj Sinha |
| 20 November 2024 | Dhanbad | 41 | Jharia | INC | Purnima Niraj Singh | BJP | Ragini Singh |
| 20 November 2024 | Dhanbad | 42 | Tundi | JMM | Mathura Prasad Mahato | BJP | Vikash Mahato |
| 20 November 2024 | Dhanbad | 43 | Baghmara | INC | Jaleshwar Mahato | BJP | Shatrughan Mahto |
| 13 November 2024 | East Singhbhum | 44 | Baharagora | JMM | Samir Mohanty | BJP | Dineshanand Goswami |
| 13 November 2024 | East Singhbhum | 45 | Ghatsila (ST) | JMM | Ramdas Soren | BJP | Babulal Soren |
| 13 November 2024 | East Singhbhum | 46 | Potka (ST) | JMM | Sanjib Sardar | BJP | Meera Munda |
| 13 November 2024 | East Singhbhum | 47 | Jugsalai (SC) | JMM | Mangal Kalindi | AJSU | Ram Chandra Sahis |
| 13 November 2024 | East Singhbhum | 48 | Jamshedpur East | INC | Ajoy Kumar | BJP | Purnima Das Sahu |
| 13 November 2024 | East Singhbhum | 49 | Jamshedpur West | INC | Banna Gupta | JD(U) | Saryu Roy |
| 13 November 2024 | Seraikela Kharsawan | 50 | Ichagarh | JMM | Sabita Mahato | AJSU | Harelal Mahato |
| 13 November 2024 | Seraikela Kharsawan | 51 | Seraikella (ST) | JMM | Ganesh Mahali | BJP | Champai Soren |
| 13 November 2024 | West Singhbhum | 52 | Chaibasa (ST) | JMM | Deepak Birua | BJP | Geeta Balmuchu |
| 13 November 2024 | West Singhbhum | 53 | Majhgaon (ST) | JMM | Niral Purty | BJP | Barkunwar Gagrai |
| 13 November 2024 | West Singhbhum | 54 | Jaganathpur (ST) | INC | Sona Ram Sinku | BJP | Geeta Koda |
| 13 November 2024 | West Singhbhum | 55 | Manoharpur (ST) | JMM | Jagat Majhi | AJSU | Dinesh Chandra Boipai |
| 13 November 2024 | West Singhbhum | 56 | Chakradharpur (ST) | JMM | Sukhram Oraon | BJP | Shashibhushan Samad |
| 13 November 2024 | Seraikela Kharsawan | 57 | Kharsawan (ST) | JMM | Dashrath Gagrai | BJP | Sonaram Bodra |
| 13 November 2024 | Ranchi | 58 | Tamar (ST) | JMM | Vikash Kumar Munda | JD(U) | Gopal Krishna Patar |
| 13 November 2024 | Khunti | 59 | Torpa (ST) | JMM | Sudeep Guria | BJP | Koche Munda |
| 13 November 2024 | Khunti | 60 | Khunti (ST) | JMM | Ram Surya Munda | BJP | Nilkanth Singh Munda |
| 20 November 2024 | Ranchi | 61 | Silli | JMM | Amit Mahato | AJSU | Sudesh Mahto |
| 20 November 2024 | Ranchi | 62 | Khijri (ST) | INC | Rajesh Kachhap | BJP | Ram Kumar Pahan |
| 13 November 2024 | Ranchi | 63 | Ranchi | JMM | Mahua Maji | BJP | Chandreshwar Prasad Singh |
| 13 November 2024 | Ranchi | 64 | Hatia | INC | Ajay Nath Sahdeo | BJP | Navin Jaiswal |
| 13 November 2024 | Ranchi | 65 | Kanke (SC) | INC | Suresh Kumar Baitha | BJP | Jitu Charan Ram |
| 13 November 2024 | Ranchi | 66 | Mandar (ST) | INC | Shilpi Neha Tirkey | BJP | Sunny Toppo |
| 13 November 2024 | Gumla | 67 | Sisai (ST) | JMM | Jiga Susaran Horo | BJP | Arun Oraon |
| 13 November 2024 | Gumla | 68 | Gumla (ST) | JMM | Bhushan Tirkey | BJP | Sudarshan Bhagat |
| 13 November 2024 | Gumla | 69 | Bishunpur (ST) | JMM | Chamra Linda | BJP | Sameer Oraon |
| 13 November 2024 | Simdega | 70 | Simdega (ST) | INC | Bhushan Bara | BJP | Shradhanand Besra |
| 13 November 2024 | Simdega | 71 | Kolebira (ST) | INC | Naman Bixal Kongari | BJP | Sujan Jojo |
| 13 November 2024 | Lohardaga | 72 | Lohardaga (ST) | INC | Rameshwar Oraon | AJSU | Niru Shanti Bhagat |
| 13 November 2024 | Latehar | 73 | Manika (ST) | INC | Ramchandra Singh | BJP | Harikrishna Singh |
| 13 November 2024 | Latehar | 74 | Latehar (SC) | JMM | Baidyanath Ram | BJP | Prakash Ram |
| 13 November 2024 | Palamu | 75 | Panki | INC | Lal Suraj | BJP | Kushwaha Shashi Bhushan Mehta |
| 13 November 2024 | Palamu | 76 | Daltonganj | INC | Krishna Nand Tripathi | BJP | Alok Kumar Chaurasiya |
| 13 November 2024 | Palamu | 77 | Bishrampur | INC | Sudhir Kumar Chandravanshi | BJP | Ramchandra Chandravanshi |
| 13 November 2024 | Palamu | 77 | Bishrampur | RJD | Naresh Prasad Singh | BJP | Ramchandra Chandravanshi |
| 13 November 2024 | Palamu | 78 | Chhatarpur (SC) | INC | Radha Krishna Kishore | BJP | Pushpa Devi Bhuiyan |
| 13 November 2024 | Palamu | 78 | Chhatarpur (SC) | RJD | Vijay Ram | BJP | Pushpa Devi Bhuiyan |
| 13 November 2024 | Palamu | 79 | Hussainabad | RJD | Sanjay Kumar Singh Yadav | BJP | Kamlesh Kumar Singh |
| 13 November 2024 | Garhwa | 80 | Garhwa | JMM | Mithilesh Kumar Thakur | BJP | Satyendra Nath Tiwari |
| 13 November 2024 | Garhwa | 81 | Bhawanathpur | JMM | Anant Pratap Deo | BJP | Bhanu Pratap Shahi |

== Post-poll surveys ==
| Polling agency | | | | Lead |
| Polling agency | NDA | MGB | Others | Lead |
|---|---|---|---|---|
| Axis My India | 17–27 | 49–59 | 1–6 | MGB |
| People's Insight | 42 | 33 | 6 | NDA |
| Chanakya Strategies | 45–50 | 35–38 | 3–5 | NDA |
| Dainik Bhaskar | 37–40 | 36–39 | 0–2 | Hung |
| Electoral Edge | 32 | 42 | 7 | MGB |
| Matrize | 42–47 | 25–30 | 1–4 | NDA |
| P Marq | 31–40 | 37–47 | 6–8 | MGB |
| Times Now – JVC | 40–44 | 30–40 | 1 | NDA |
| People's Pulse | 44–53 | 25–37 | 5–9 | NDA |

According to a Lokniti post-poll survey, the INDIA alliance's Maiya Samman Scheme, which initially provided ₹1,000 and later increased to ₹2,500, garnered support from 47% of registered women voters, particularly in rural areas. In contrast, the BJP's Gogo Didi Scheme, offering ₹2,100, found greater appeal among urban women voters. Overall, women showed stronger backing for the INDIA alliance (45%) compared to the BJP (38%), with rural women (48%) and tribal women (60%) favoring INDIA significantly. The BJP, however, performed better among urban and non-tribal women voters. A notable outcome was the BJP securing only one ST-reserved seat, reflecting tribal dissatisfaction attributed to issues such as changes in tenancy laws, messaging perceived as undermining tribal identity, and Hemant Soren's incarceration. Women voter turnout was remarkably high at 70.46% (91.16 lakh), surpassing men's turnout of 65% (85.64 lakh), with the gender gap widening compared to the previous Lok Sabha elections.

== Results ==
=== Results by alliance or party ===
| 56 | 24 | 1 |
| MGB | NDA | JLKM |

| 34 | 16 | 4 | 2 | 21 | 1 | 1 | 1 | 1 |
| JMM | INC | RJD | CPI(ML)L | BJP | AJSU | JD(U) | LJP(RV) | JLKM |

Party wise Vote Share
1. BJP (33.2%)
2. JMM (23.4%)
3. INC (15.6%)
4. JLKM (6.20%)
5. AJSU (3.54%)
6. RJD (3.44%)
7. Others (14.6%)
Party wise seats
1. JMM (42.0%)
2. BJP (25.9%)
3. INC (19.8%)
4. RJD (4.92%)
5. CPI(ML)L (2.46%)
6. AJSU (1.23%)
7. JD(U) (1.23%)
8. LJP(RV) (1.23%)
9. JLKM (1.23%)
Alliance-wise seats
1. MGB (69.1%)
2. NDA (29.6%)
3. JLKM (1.23%)

| Alliance/ Party | | Popular vote | | | Seats | | |
| Alliance/ Party | | Votes | % | ±pp | Contested | Won | +/− |
|---|---|---|---|---|---|---|---|
| MGB | JMM | 4,183,281 | 23.44 | ▲4.72 | 43 | 34 | ▲4 |
| MGB | INC | 2,776,805 | 15.56 | ▲1.68 | 30 | 16 | Steady |
| MGB | RJD | 613,880 | 3.44 | ▲0.69 | 7 | 4 | ▲3 |
| MGB | CPI(ML)L | 337,062 | 1.89 | ▲0.74 | 4 | 2 | ▲1 |
| MGB | Total | 7,911,028 | 44.33 | ▲8.98 | 81 | 56 | ▲8 |
| NDA | BJP | 5,921,474 | 33.18 | ▼0.19 | 68 | 21 | ▼4 |
| NDA | AJSU | 632,186 | 3.54 | ▼4.56 | 10 | 1 | ▼1 |
| NDA | JD(U) | 145,040 | 0.81 | ▲0.07 | 2 | 1 | ▲1 |
| NDA | LJP(RV) | 109,019 | 0.61 | New | 1 | 1 | New |
| NDA | Total | 6,807,719 | 38.14 | ▼4.68 | 81 | 24 | ▼3 |
| JLKM | | 1,092,178 | 6.20 | New | 68 | 1 | New |
| Other parties | | 455,743 | 3.67 | | | 0 | ▼4 |
| Independents | | 1,126,753 | 6.39 | | | 0 | ▼2 |
| NOTA | | 226,431 | 1.27 | | | | |
| Total | | 17,619,852 | 100% | – | 81 | 81 | – |

=== Results by phase ===
| District | Seats | | | |
| District | Seats | MGB | NDA | JLM |
| 1 | 43 | 27 | 16 | 0 |
| 2 | 38 | 29 | 8 | 1 |
| Total | 81 | 56 | 24 | 1 |

=== Results by district ===
| District | Seats | | | |
| District | Seats | MGB | NDA | JLM |
| Sahebganj | 3 | 3 | —N/a | —N/a |
| Pakur | 3 | 3 | —N/a | —N/a |
| Dumka | 4 | 3 | 1 | —N/a |
| Jamtara | 2 | 2 | —N/a | —N/a |
| Deoghar | 3 | 3 | —N/a | —N/a |
| Godda | 3 | 3 | —N/a | —N/a |
| Kodarma | 1 | —N/a | 1 | —N/a |
| Hazaribagh | 4 | —N/a | 4 | —N/a |
| Ramgarh | 2 | 1 | 1 | —N/a |
| Chatra | 2 | —N/a | 2 | —N/a |
| Giridih | 6 | 2 | 3 | 1 |
| Bokaro | 4 | 4 | —N/a | —N/a |
| Dhanbad | 6 | 3 | 3 | —N/a |
| East Singhbhum | 6 | 4 | 2 | —N/a |
| Seraikela Kharsawan | 3 | 2 | 1 | —N/a |
| West Singhbhum | 5 | 5 | —N/a | —N/a |
| Ranchi | 7 | 5 | 2 | —N/a |
| Khunti | 2 | 2 | —N/a | —N/a |
| Gumla | 3 | 3 | —N/a | —N/a |
| Simdega | 2 | 2 | —N/a | —N/a |
| Lohardaga | 1 | 1 | —N/a | —N/a |
| Latehar | 2 | 1 | 1 | —N/a |
| Palamu | 5 | 3 | 2 | —N/a |
| Garhwa | 2 | 1 | 1 | —N/a |
| Total | 81 | 56 | 24 | 1 |

=== Results by constituency ===
| District | Constituency | | Winner | | | | Runner-up | | | | Margin | |
| District | No. | Name | Candidate | Party | Votes | % | Candidate | Party | Votes | % | Votes | % |
|---|---|---|---|---|---|---|---|---|---|---|---|---|
| Sahebganj | 1 | Rajmahal | Md. Tajuddin | JMM | 1,40,176 | 53.67 | Anant Kumar Ojha | BJP | 96,744 | 37.04 | 43,432 | 16.63 |
| Sahebganj | 2 | Borio (ST) | Dhananjay Soren | JMM | 97,317 | 50.79 | Lobin Hembrom | BJP | 78,044 | 40.73 | 19,273 | 10.06 |
| Sahebganj | 3 | Barhait (ST) | Hemant Soren | JMM | 95,612 | 58.95 | Gamliyel Hembrom | BJP | 55,821 | 34.42 | 39,791 | 24.53 |
| Pakur | 4 | Litipara (ST) | Hemlal Murmu | JMM | 88,469 | 53.97 | Babudhan Murmu | BJP | 61,720 | 37.65 | 26,749 | 16.32 |
| Pakur | 5 | Pakur | Nisat Alam | INC | 1,55,827 | 52.27 | Azhar Islam | AJSU | 69,798 | 23.41 | 86,029 | 28.86 |
| Pakur | 6 | Maheshpur (ST) | Stephen Marandi | JMM | 1,14,924 | 59.63 | Navneet Anthony Hembrom | BJP | 53,749 | 27.89 | 61,175 | 31.74 |
| Dumka | 7 | Sikaripara (ST) | Alok Kumar Soren | JMM | 1,02,199 | 58.63 | Paritosh Soren | BJP | 61,025 | 35.01 | 41,174 | 23.62 |
| Jamtara | 8 | Nala | Rabindra Nath Mahato | JMM | 92,702 | 47.09 | Madhav Chandra Mahato | BJP | 82,219 | 41.76 | 10,483 | 5.33 |
| Jamtara | 9 | Jamtara | Irfan Ansari | INC | 1,33,266 | 54.62 | Sita Soren | BJP | 89,590 | 36.72 | 43,676 | 17.90 |
| Dumka | 10 | Dumka (ST) | Basant Soren | JMM | 95,685 | 51.33 | Sunil Soren | BJP | 81,097 | 43.50 | 14,588 | 7.83 |
| Dumka | 11 | Jama (ST) | Lois Marandi | JMM | 76,424 | 46.89 | Suresh Murmu | BJP | 70,686 | 43.37 | 5,738 | 3.52 |
| Dumka | 12 | Jarmundi | Devendra Kunwar | BJP | 94,892 | 48.73 | Badal Patralekh | INC | 77,346 | 39.72 | 17,546 | 9.01 |
| Deoghar | 13 | Madhupur | Hafizul Hasan | JMM | 1,43,953 | 50.97 | Ganga Narayan Singh | BJP | 1,23,926 | 43.88 | 20,027 | 7.09 |
| Deoghar | 14 | Sarath | Uday Shankar Singh | JMM | 1,35,219 | 54.32 | Randhir Kumar Singh | BJP | 97,790 | 39.28 | 37,429 | 15.04 |
| Deoghar | 15 | Deoghar (SC) | Suresh Paswan | RJD | 1,56,079 | 53.53 | Narayan Das | BJP | 1,16,358 | 39.91 | 39,721 | 13.62 |
| Godda | 16 | Poreyahat | Pradeep Yadav | INC | 1,17,842 | 52.90 | Devendranath Singh | BJP | 83,712 | 37.58 | 34,130 | 15.32 |
| Godda | 17 | Godda | Sanjay Prasad Yadav | RJD | 1,09,487 | 49.56 | Amit Kumar Mandal | BJP | 88,016 | 39.84 | 21,471 | 9.72 |
| Godda | 18 | Mahagama | Dipika Pandey Singh | INC | 1,14,069 | 51.03 | Ashok Kumar | BJP | 95,424 | 42.69 | 18,645 | 8.34 |
| Kodarma | 19 | Kodarma | Neera Yadav | BJP | 86,734 | 33.69 | Subhash Yadav | RJD | 80,919 | 31.43 | 5,815 | 2.26 |
| Hazaribagh | 20 | Barkatha | Amit Kumar Yadav | BJP | 82,221 | 32.77 | Janki Prasad Yadav | JMM | 78,561 | 31.31 | 3,660 | 1.46 |
| Hazaribagh | 21 | Barhi | Manoj Yadav | BJP | 1,13,274 | 51.09 | Arun Sahu | INC | 63,983 | 28.86 | 49,291 | 22.23 |
| Ramgarh | 22 | Barkagaon | Roshan Lal Choudhary | BJP | 1,24,468 | 46.85 | Amba Prasad Sahu | INC | 93,075 | 35.03 | 31,393 | 11.82 |
| Ramgarh | 23 | Ramgarh | Mamta Devi | INC | 89,818 | 34.51 | Sunita Choudhary | AJSU | 83,028 | 31.90 | 6,790 | 3.51 |
| Hazaribagh | 24 | Mandu | Nirmal Mahto | AJSU | 90,871 | 31.85 | Jai Prakash Bhai Patel | INC | 90,640 | 31.77 | 231 | 0.08 |
| Hazaribagh | 25 | Hazaribagh | Pradip Prasad | BJP | 1,39,458 | 51.91 | Munna Singh | INC | 95,981 | 35.73 | 43,477 | 16.18 |
| Chatra | 26 | Simaria (SC) | Kumar Ujjwal | BJP | 1,11,906 | 44.47 | Manoj Kumar Chandra | JMM | 1,07,905 | 42.88 | 4,001 | 1.59 |
| Chatra | 27 | Chatra (SC) | Janardan Paswan | LJP(RV) | 1,09,019 | 40.58 | Rashmi Prakash | RJD | 90,618 | 33.73 | 18,401 | 6.85 |
| Giridih | 28 | Dhanwar | Babulal Marandi | BJP | 1,06,296 | 45.35 | Nizam Uddin Ansari | JMM | 70,858 | 30.23 | 35,438 | 15.12 |
| Giridih | 29 | Bagodar | Nagendra Mahto | BJP | 1,27,501 | 50.22 | Vinod Kumar Singh | CPI(ML)L | 94,884 | 37.37 | 32,617 | 12.85 |
| Giridih | 30 | Jamua (SC) | Manju Kumari | BJP | 1,17,532 | 53.40 | Kedar Hazra | JMM | 84,901 | 38.58 | 32,631 | 15.12 |
| Giridih | 31 | Gandey | Kalpana Soren | JMM | 1,19,372 | 50.51 | Muniya Devi | BJP | 1,02,230 | 43.26 | 17,142 | 7.25 |
| Giridih | 32 | Giridih | Sudivya Kumar Sonu | JMM | 94,042 | 45.28 | Nirbhay Shahbadi | BJP | 90,204 | 43.43 | 3,838 | 1.85 |
| Giridih | 33 | Dumri | Jairam Kumar Mahato | JLKM | 94,496 | 41.80 | Baby Devi | JMM | 83,551 | 36.96 | 10,945 | 4.84 |
| Bokaro | 34 | Gomia | Yogendra Prasad | JMM | 95,170 | 42.19 | Puja Kumari | JLKM | 59,077 | 26.19 | 36,093 | 16.00 |
| Bokaro | 35 | Bermo | Kumar Jaimangal Singh | INC | 90,246 | 40.34 | Jairam Kumar Mahato | JLKM | 60,871 | 27.21 | 29,375 | 13.13 |
| Bokaro | 36 | Bokaro | Shwettaa Singh | INC | 1,33,438 | 42.34 | Biranchi Narayan | BJP | 1,26,231 | 40.05 | 7,207 | 2.29 |
| Bokaro | 37 | Chandankiyari (SC) | Umakant Rajak | JMM | 90,027 | 42.56 | Arjun Rajwar | JLKM | 56,294 | 26.61 | 33,733 | 15.95 |
| Dhanbad | 38 | Sindri | Chandradeo Mahato | CPI(ML)L | 1,05,136 | 39.64 | Tara Devi | BJP | 1,01,688 | 38.34 | 3,488 | 1.30 |
| Dhanbad | 39 | Nirsa | Arup Chatterjee | CPI(ML)L | 1,04,855 | 43.74 | Aparna Sengupta | BJP | 1,03,047 | 42.98 | 1,808 | 0.76 |
| Dhanbad | 40 | Dhanbad | Raj Sinha | BJP | 1,36,336 | 53.90 | Ajay Dubey | INC | 87,595 | 34.63 | 48,741 | 19.27 |
| Dhanbad | 41 | Jharia | Ragini Singh | BJP | 87,892 | 51.47 | Purnima Niraj Singh | INC | 73,381 | 42.97 | 14,511 | 8.50 |
| Dhanbad | 42 | Tundi | Mathura Prasad Mahato | JMM | 95,527 | 41.29 | Vikash Mahato | BJP | 69,924 | 30.22 | 25,603 | 11.07 |
| Dhanbad | 43 | Baghmara | Shatrughan Mahto | BJP | 87,529 | 43.85 | Jaleshwar Mahato | INC | 68,847 | 34.49 | 18,682 | 9.36 |
| East Singhbhum | 44 | Baharagora | Samir Mohanty | JMM | 96,870 | 50.65 | Dineshananda Goswami | BJP | 78,745 | 41.17 | 18,125 | 9.48 |
| East Singhbhum | 45 | Ghatsila (ST) | Ramdas Soren | JMM | 98,356 | 51.50 | Babulal Soren | BJP | 75,910 | 39.75 | 22,446 | 11.75 |
| East Singhbhum | 46 | Potka (ST) | Sanjib Sardar | JMM | 1,20,322 | 51.97 | Meera Munda | BJP | 92,420 | 39.92 | 27,902 | 12.05 |
| East Singhbhum | 47 | Jugsalai (SC) | Mangal Kalindi | JMM | 1,21,290 | 48.26 | Ram Chandra Sahis | AJSU | 77,845 | 30.97 | 43,445 | 17.29 |
| East Singhbhum | 48 | Jamshedpur East | Purnima Sahu | BJP | 1,07,191 | 54.39 | Ajoy Kumar | INC | 64,320 | 32.63 | 42,871 | 21.76 |
| East Singhbhum | 49 | Jamshedpur West | Saryu Roy | JD(U) | 1,03,631 | 46.74 | Banna Gupta | INC | 95,768 | 43.19 | 7,863 | 3.55 |
| Seraikela Kharsawan | 50 | Ichaghar | Sabita Mahato | JMM | 77,552 | 33.90 | Hare Lal Mahato | AJSU | 51,029 | 22.31 | 26,523 | 11.59 |
| Seraikela Kharsawan | 51 | Seraikella (ST) | Champai Soren | BJP | 1,19,379 | 44.27 | Ganesh Mahali | JMM | 98,932 | 36.69 | 20,447 | 7.58 |
| West Singhbhum | 52 | Chaibasa (ST) | Deepak Birua | JMM | 1,07,367 | 64.89 | Geeta Balmuchu | BJP | 42,532 | 25.70 | 64,835 | 39.19 |
| West Singhbhum | 53 | Majhgaon (ST) | Niral Purty | JMM | 94,163 | 60.96 | Barkuwar Gagrai | BJP | 34,560 | 22.37 | 59,603 | 38.59 |
| West Singhbhum | 54 | Jaganathpur (ST) | Sona Ram Sinku | INC | 57,065 | 40.89 | Geeta Koda | BJP | 49,682 | 35.60 | 7,383 | 5.29 |
| West Singhbhum | 55 | Manoharpur (ST) | Jagat Majhi | JMM | 73,034 | 51.53 | Dinesh Chandra Boipai | AJSU | 41,078 | 28.98 | 31,956 | 22.55 |
| West Singhbhum | 56 | Chakradharpur (ST) | Sukhram Oraon | JMM | 58,639 | 40.64 | Shashibhushan Samad | BJP | 49,329 | 34.19 | 9,310 | 6.45 |
| Seraikela Kharsawan | 57 | Kharsawan (ST) | Dashrath Gagrai | JMM | 85,772 | 47.24 | Sonaram Bodra | BJP | 53,157 | 29.28 | 32,615 | 17.96 |
| Ranchi | 58 | Tamar (ST) | Vikash Kumar Munda | JMM | 65,655 | 40.28 | Gopal Krishna Patar | JD(U) | 41,409 | 25.40 | 24,246 | 14.88 |
| Khunti | 59 | Torpa (ST) | Sudeep Gudhiya | JMM | 80,887 | 59.76 | Koche Munda | BJP | 40,240 | 29.73 | 40,647 | 30.03 |
| Khunti | 60 | Khunti (ST) | Ram Surya Munda | JMM | 91,721 | 57.38 | Nilkanth Singh Munda | BJP | 49,668 | 31.07 | 42,053 | 26.31 |
| Ranchi | 61 | Silli | Amit Mahto | JMM | 73,169 | 41.91 | Sudesh Mahto | AJSU | 49,302 | 28.24 | 23,867 | 13.67 |
| Ranchi | 62 | Khijri (ST) | Rajesh Kachhap | INC | 1,24,049 | 47.11 | Ram Kumar Pahan | BJP | 94,984 | 36.07 | 29,065 | 11.04 |
| Ranchi | 63 | Ranchi | Chandreshwar Prasad Singh | BJP | 1,07,290 | 53.91 | Mahua Maji | JMM | 85,341 | 42.88 | 21,949 | 11.03 |
| Ranchi | 64 | Hatia | Navin Jaiswal | BJP | 1,52,949 | 49.16 | Ajay Nath Shahdeo | INC | 1,38,326 | 44.46 | 14,623 | 4.70 |
| Ranchi | 65 | Kanke (SC) | Suresh Kumar Baitha | INC | 1,33,499 | 43.47 | Dr. Jitu Charan Ram | BJP | 1,32,531 | 43.16 | 968 | 0.31 |
| Ranchi | 66 | Mandar (ST) | Shilpi Neha Tirkey | INC | 1,35,936 | 49.01 | Sunny Toppo | BJP | 1,13,133 | 40.79 | 22,803 | 8.22 |
| Gumla | 67 | Sisai (ST) | Jiga Susaran Horo | JMM | 1,06,058 | 55.09 | Arun Kumar Oraon | BJP | 67,069 | 34.84 | 38,989 | 20.25 |
| Gumla | 68 | Gumla (ST) | Bhushan Tirkey | JMM | 84,974 | 51.54 | Sudarshan Bhagat | BJP | 58,673 | 35.59 | 26,301 | 15.95 |
| Gumla | 69 | Bishunpur (ST) | Chamra Linda | JMM | 1,00,366 | 49.64 | Samir Oraon | BJP | 67,580 | 33.43 | 32,756 | 16.21 |
| Simdega | 70 | Simdega (ST) | Bhushan Bara | INC | 75,392 | 44.13 | Shradhanand Besra | BJP | 66,164 | 38.73 | 9,228 | 5.40 |
| Simdega | 71 | Kolebira (ST) | Naman Bixal Kongari | INC | 75,376 | 51.86 | Sujan JoJo | BJP | 38,345 | 26.38 | 37,031 | 25.48 |
| Lohardaga | 72 | Lohardaga (ST) | Rameshwar Oraon | INC | 1,13,507 | 53.06 | Neru Shanti Bhagat | BJP | 78,837 | 36.85 | 34,670 | 16.21 |
| Latehar | 73 | Manika (ST) | Ramchandra Singh | INC | 74,946 | 42.50 | Harikrishna Singh | BJP | 58,092 | 32.94 | 16,854 | 9.56 |
| Latehar | 74 | Latehar (SC) | Prakash Ram | BJP | 98,063 | 44.74 | Baidyanath Ram | JMM | 97,628 | 44.54 | 434 | 0.20 |
| Palamu | 75 | Panki | Kushwaha Shashi Bhushan Mehta | BJP | 75,991 | 35.19 | Devendra Kumar Singh | Ind | 66,195 | 30.66 | 9,796 | 4.53 |
| Palamu | 76 | Daltonganj | Alok Kumar Chaurasiya | BJP | 1,02,175 | 38.43 | Krishna Nand Tripathi | INC | 1,01,285 | 38.10 | 890 | 0.33 |
| Palamu | 77 | Bishrampur | Naresh Prasad Singh | RJD | 74,338 | 32.34 | Ramchandra Chandravanshi | BJP | 59,751 | 25.99 | 14,587 | 6.35 |
| Palamu | 78 | Chhatarpur (SC) | Radha Krishna Kishore | INC | 71,857 | 36.52 | Pushpa Devi | BJP | 71,121 | 36.15 | 736 | 0.37 |
| Palamu | 79 | Hussainabad | Sanjay Kumar Singh Yadav | RJD | 81,476 | 41.98 | Kamlesh Kumar Singh | BJP | 47,112 | 24.27 | 34,364 | 17.71 |
| Garhwa | 80 | Garhwa | Satyendra Nath Tiwari | BJP | 1,33,109 | 45.40 | Mithilesh Kumar Thakur | JMM | 1,16,356 | 39.68 | 16,753 | 5.72 |
| Garhwa | 81 | Bhawanathpur | Anant Pratap Deo | JMM | 1,46,265 | 48.49 | Bhanu Pratap Sahi | BJP | 1,24,803 | 41.37 | 21,462 | 7.12 |

== Reactions ==
Prime Minister Narendra Modi extended his congratulations to the Jharkhand Mukti Morcha (JMM) on its electoral victory, to which Chief Minister Hemant Soren responded with gratitude, thanking the Prime Minister for his wishes. Chief Minister Hemant Soren lauded the state's democratic engagement. Soren also expressed gratitude to the people for their overwhelming support and underscored the cultural and political vision encapsulated in the phrase "Abua Raj, Abua Sarkar" (our state, our government), which he asserted as a commitment to the ideals of self-reliance and local empowerment.

Following the Jharkhand Assembly election results, incidents of violence and vandalism come up, signaling the presence of deep political divides. A person named Imam Mirza in Mohammadpur village was alleged by the BJP to have been attacked by JMM workers for supporting BJP. In Barkagaon, the Congress candidate Amba Prasad alleged that her car came under attack from supporters of the newly elected BJP MLA Roshan Lal Choudhary after the result. Prasad showed images of her car with a bashed in windshield to support her assertion and questioned their motives.

== See also ==
- 2024 elections in India
- Elections in Jharkhand
- Government of Jharkhand
- Jharkhand Legislative Assembly
- List of chief ministers of Jharkhand
- List of deputy chief ministers of Jharkhand
- Politics of Jharkhand
- 2024 Maharashtra Legislative Assembly election
