= 5th Jharkhand Assembly =

Unicameral legislature of the India state of Jharkhand

5th Jharkhand Legislative Assembly

Type
- Type: Unicameral
- Houses: Jharkhand Legislative Assembly
- Term limits: 5 years

History
- Founded: 2019
- Disbanded: 2024
- Preceded by: 4th Jharkhand Assembly
- Succeeded by: 6th Jharkhand Assembly

Leadership
- Speaker: Rabindra Nath Mahato, JMM since 7 January 2020
- Leader of the House (Chief Minister): Hemant Soren, JMM since 02 July 2024
- Leader of the Opposition: Amar Kumar Bauri, BJP since 16 October 2023

Structure
- Seats: 82 (81+1 Nominated)
- Political groups: Government (45) INDIA (45): JMM (26); INC (17); CPI(ML)L (1); RJD (1); Official Opposition (30) NDA (30): BJP (26); AJSU (3); JD (U) (1); Nominated (1) NOM (1) Vacant (6) Vacant (6)
- Length of term: 2019-2024

Elections
- Voting system: First past the post
- Last election: 30 November - 20 December 2019
- Next election: November - December 2024

Meeting place
- Jharkhand Vidhansabha, Kute village, Ranchi

Website
- jharkhandvidhansabha.nic.in

The 5th Jharkhand Legislative Assembly was constituted after the 2019 Jharkhand Legislative Assembly election. It is the unicameral state legislature of Jharkhand.

== Members of Legislative Assembly ==
District	No.	Constituency	Name	Party	Alliance	Remarks
Sahebganj	1	Rajmahal	Anant Kumar Ojha	Bharatiya Janata Party	NDA	
Sahebganj	2	Borio	Lobin Hembrom	Jharkhand Mukti Morcha	MGB	Disqualified on 25 July 2024
Sahebganj	2	Borio	Vacant			
Sahebganj	3	Barhait	Hemant Soren	Jharkhand Mukti Morcha	MGB	Chief Minister
Pakur	4	Litipara	Dinesh William Marandi	Jharkhand Mukti Morcha	MGB	
Pakur	5	Pakur	Alamgir Alam	Indian National Congress	MGB	Cabinet Minister (Parliamentary Affairs, Rural development)
Pakur	6	Maheshpur	Stephen Marandi	Jharkhand Mukti Morcha	MGB	
Dumka	7	Sikaripara	Nalin Soren	Jharkhand Mukti Morcha	MGB	
Dumka	7	Sikaripara	Vacant - Won in 2024 Indian general election to Dumka Lok Sabha Constituency			
Jamtara	8	Nala	Rabindra Nath Mahato	Jharkhand Mukti Morcha	MGB	Speaker of the Jharkhand Legislative Assembly
Jamtara	9	Jamtara	Irfan Ansari	Indian National Congress	MGB	Cabinet Minister (Rural Development, Rural Works and Panchayati Raj)
Dumka	10	Dumka	Basant Soren	Jharkhand Mukti Morcha	MGB	
Dumka	11	Jama	Sita Soren	Bharatiya Janata Party	NDA	
Dumka	12	Jarmundi	Badal Patralekh	Indian National Congress	MGB	Cabinet Minister (Agriculture, Animal husbandry and cooperatives)
Deoghar	13	Madhupur	Haji Hussain Ansari	Jharkhand Mukti Morcha	MGB	Died
Deoghar	13	Madhupur	Hafizul Hasan	Jharkhand Mukti Morcha	MGB	Cabinet Minister (Tourism, Arts, Culture, Sports, Youth Affairs Minority and backward Welfare. (Minority affairs)
Deoghar	14	Sarath	Randhir Kumar Singh	Bharatiya Janata Party	NDA	
Deoghar	15	Deoghar	Narayan Das	Bharatiya Janata Party	NDA	
Godda	16	Poreyahat	Pradeep Yadav	Jharkhand Vikas Morcha		Switched from JVM (P) to INC
Godda	16	Poreyahat	Pradeep Yadav	Indian National Congress	MGB	Switched from JVM (P) to INC
Godda	17	Godda	Amit Kumar Mandal	Bharatiya Janata Party	NDA	
Godda	18	Mahagama	Dipika Pandey Singh	Indian National Congress	MGB	
Koderma	19	Kodarma	Dr. Neera Yadav	Bharatiya Janata Party	NDA	
Hazaribagh	20	Barkatha	Amit Kumar Yadav	Bharatiya Janata Party	NDA	Switched from Independent to BJP.
Hazaribagh	21	Barhi	Umashankar Akela	Indian National Congress	MGB	
Ramgarh	22	Barkagaon	Amba Prasad	Indian National Congress	MGB	
Ramgarh	23	Ramgarh	Mamta Devi	Indian National Congress	MGB	Disqualified on 26 December 2022
Ramgarh	23	Ramgarh	Sunita Choudhary	All Jharkhand Students Union	NDA	Won in 2023 bypoll after disqualification of sitting MLA
Hazaribagh	24	Mandu	Jai Prakash Bhai Patel	Bharatiya Janata Party	NDA	Disqualified on 25 July 2024
Hazaribagh	24	Mandu	Vacant			
Hazaribagh	25	Hazaribagh	Manish Jaiswal	Bharatiya Janata Party	NDA	Won in 2024 Indian general election to Hazaribagh Lok Sabha Constituency
Hazaribagh	25	Hazaribagh	Vacant			
Chatra	26	Simaria	Kishun Kumar Das	Bharatiya Janata Party	NDA	
Chatra	27	Chatra	Satyanand Bhogta	Rashtriya Janata Dal"	MGB	Cabinet Minister
Giridih	28	Dhanwar	Babulal Marandi	Bharatiya Janata Party	NDA	JVM (P) merged into BJP
Giridih	29	Bagodar	Vinod Kumar Singh	Communist Party of India (Marxist–Leninist) Liberation	MGB	
Giridih	30	Jamua	Kedar Hazra	Bharatiya Janata Party	NDA	
Giridih	31	Gandey	Sarfaraz Ahmad	Jharkhand Mukti Morcha	MGB	Resigned on 1 January 2024
Giridih	31	Gandey	Kalpana Soren	Jharkhand Mukti Morcha	MGB	Won in 2024 Bypoll
Giridih	32	Giridih	Sudivya Kumar	Jharkhand Mukti Morcha	MGB	
Giridih	33	Dumri	Jagarnath Mahto	Jharkhand Mukti Morcha	MGB	Died on 6 April 2023
Giridih	33	Dumri	Baby Devi	Jharkhand Mukti Morcha	MGB	Won in 2023 Bypoll
Bokaro	34	Gomia	Lambodar Mahto	All Jharkhand Students Union	NDA	
Bokaro	35	Bermo	Kumar Jaimangal	Indian National Congress	MGB	
Bokaro	36	Bokaro	Biranchi Narayan	Bharatiya Janata Party	NDA	
Bokaro	37	Chandankiyari	Amar Kumar Bauri	Bharatiya Janata Party	NDA	Leader of Opposition (LoP)
Dhanbad	38	Sindri	Indrajit Mahato	Bharatiya Janata Party	NDA	
Dhanbad	39	Nirsa	Aparna Sengupta	Bharatiya Janata Party	NDA	
Dhanbad	40	Dhanbad	Raj Sinha	Bharatiya Janata Party	NDA	
Dhanbad	41	Jharia	Purnima Niraj Singh	Indian National Congress	MGB	
Dhanbad	42	Tundi	Mathura Prasad Mahato	Jharkhand Mukti Morcha	MGB	
Dhanbad	43	Baghmara	Dulu Mahato	Bharatiya Janata Party	NDA	Won in 2024 Indian general election to Dhanbad Lok Sabha Constituency
Dhanbad	43	Baghmara	Vacant			
East Singhbhum	44	Baharagora	Samir Kr. Mohanty	Jharkhand Mukti Morcha	MGB	
East Singhbhum	45	Ghatsila	Ramdas Soren	Jharkhand Mukti Morcha	MGB	Cabinet Minister
East Singhbhum	46	Potka	Sanjib Sardar	Jharkhand Mukti Morcha	MGB	
East Singhbhum	47	Jugsalai	Mangal Kalindi	Jharkhand Mukti Morcha	MGB	
East Singhbhum	48	Jamshedpur East	Saryu Roy	Janata Dal (United)	NDA	
East Singhbhum	49	Jamshedpur West	Banna Gupta	Indian National Congress	MGB	Cabinet Minister
Seraikela Kharsawan	50	Ichaghar	Sabita Mahato	Jharkhand Mukti Morcha	MGB	
Seraikela Kharsawan	51	Seraikella	Champai Soren	Bharatiya Janata Party	NDA	Switched from JMM to BJP
West Singhbhum	52	Chaibasa	Deepak Birua	Jharkhand Mukti Morcha	MGB	
West Singhbhum	53	Majhgaon	Niral Purty	Jharkhand Mukti Morcha	MGB	
West Singhbhum	54	Jaganathpur	Sona Ram Sinku	Indian National Congress	MGB	
West Singhbhum	55	Manoharpur	Joba Majhi	Jharkhand Mukti Morcha	MGB	Won in 2024 Indian general election to Singhbum Lok Sabha Constituency
West Singhbhum	55	Manoharpur	Vacant			
West Singhbhum	56	Chakradharpur	Sukhram Oraon	Jharkhand Mukti Morcha	MGB	
Seraikela Kharsawan	57	Kharsawan	Dasrath Gagrai	Jharkhand Mukti Morcha	MGB	
Ranchi	58	Tamar	Vikash Kumar Munda	Jharkhand Mukti Morcha	MGB	
Khunti	59	Torpa	Koche Munda	Bharatiya Janata Party	NDA	
Khunti	60	Khunti	Nilkanth Singh Munda	Bharatiya Janata Party	NDA	
Ranchi	61	Silli	Sudhesh Kumar Mahto	All Jharkhand Students Union	NDA	
Ranchi	62	Khijri	Rajesh Kachhap	Indian National Congress	MGB	
Ranchi	63	Ranchi	Chandreshwar Prasad Singh	Bharatiya Janata Party	NDA	
Ranchi	64	Hatia	Navin Jaiswal	Bharatiya Janata Party	NDA	
Ranchi	65	Kanke	Sammari Lal	Bharatiya Janata Party	NDA	
Ranchi	66	Mandar	Bandhu Tirkey	Jharkhand Vikas Morcha		Disqualified on 8 April 2022
Ranchi	66	Mandar	Shilpi Neha Tirkey	Indian National Congress	MGB	Won in 2022 bypoll after disqualification of sitting MLA
Gumla	67	Sisai	Jiga Susaran Horo	Jharkhand Mukti Morcha	MGB	
Gumla	68	Gumla	Bhushan Tirkey	Jharkhand Mukti Morcha	MGB	
Gumla	69	Bishunpur	Chamra Linda	Jharkhand Mukti Morcha	MGB	
Simdega	70	Simdega	Bhushan Bara	Indian National Congress	MGB	
Simdega	71	Kolebira	Naman Bixal Kongari	Indian National Congress	MGB	
Lohardaga	72	Lohardaga	Rameshwar Oraon	Indian National Congress	MGB	Cabinet Minister
Latehar	73	Manika	Ramachandra Singh	Indian National Congress	MGB	
Latehar	74	Latehar	Baidyanath Ram	Jharkhand Mukti Morcha	MGB	
Palamu	75	Panki	Kushwaha Shashi Bhusan Mehta	Bharatiya Janata Party	NDA	
Palamu	76	Daltonganj	Alok Kumar Chaurasiya	Bharatiya Janata Party	NDA	
Palamu	77	Bishrampur	Ramachandra Chandravanshi	Bharatiya Janata Party	NDA	
Palamu	78	Chhatarpur	Pushpa Devi	Bharatiya Janata Party	NDA	
Palamu	79	Hussainabad	Kamlesh Kumar Singh	Bhartiya Janata Party	NDA	Switched from NCP to BJP
Garhwa	80	Garhwa	Mithilesh Kumar Thakur	Jharkhand Mukti Morcha	MGB	Cabinet Minister
Garhwa	81	Bhawanathpur	Bhanu Pratap Shahi	Bharatiya Janata Party	NDA	
	82	Nominated	Glen Joseph Galstaun	Nominated		

== See also ==
- List of chief ministers of Jharkhand
- List of constituencies of the Jharkhand Legislative Assembly
- List of deputy chief ministers of Jharkhand
- List of speakers of the Jharkhand Legislative Assembly
- List of leaders of the opposition in the Jharkhand Legislative Assembly
