= 2014 Jharkhand Legislative Assembly election =

- 3 March 2014

81 seats of Jharkhand Legislative Assembly 41 seats needed for a majority
- Turnout: 66.53% (▲9.56%)
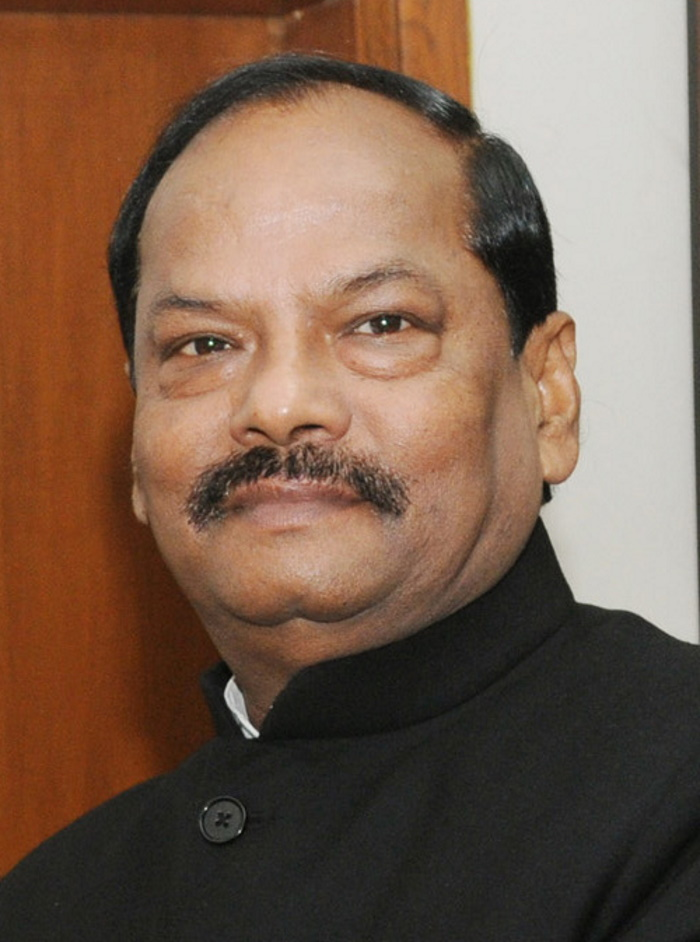

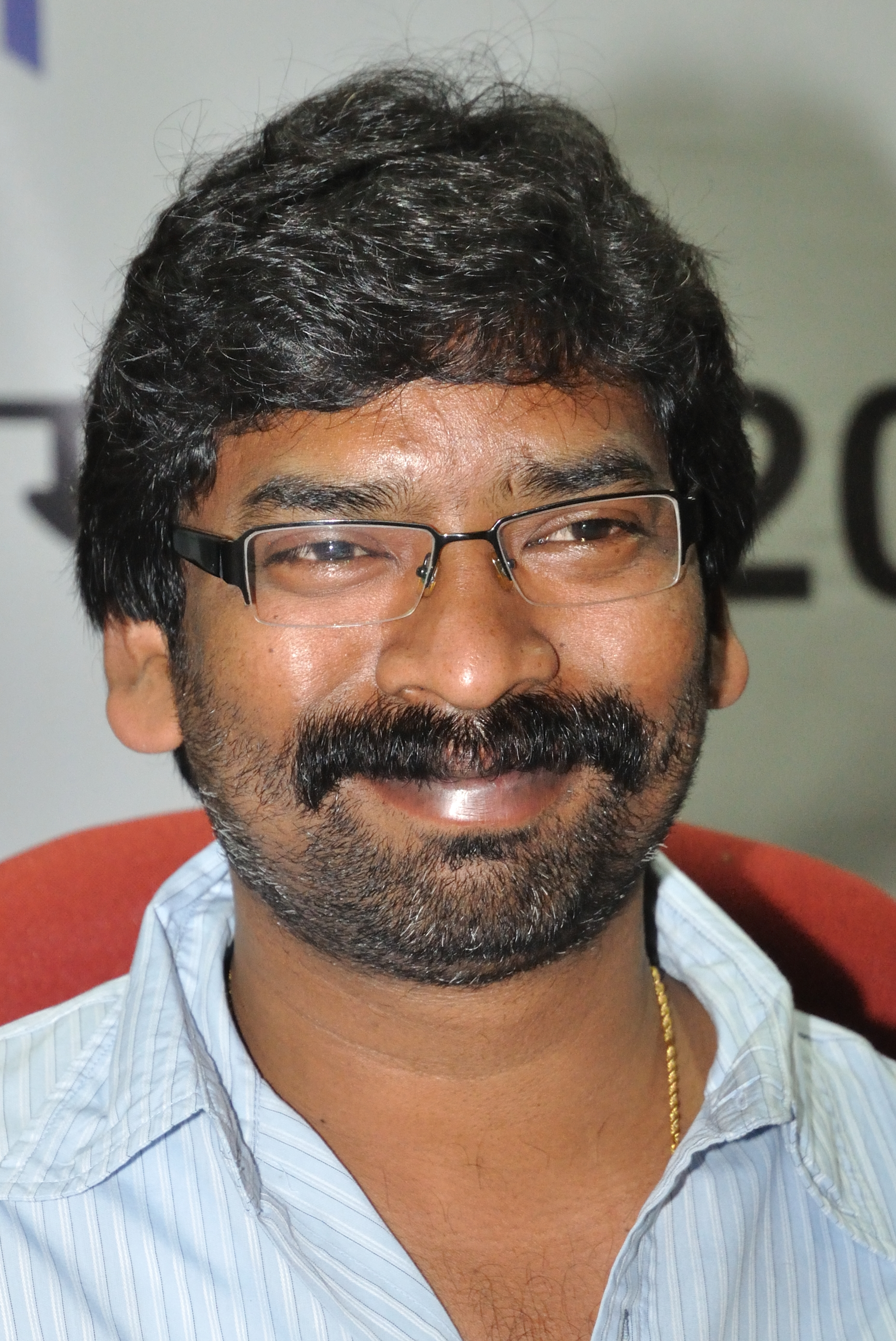

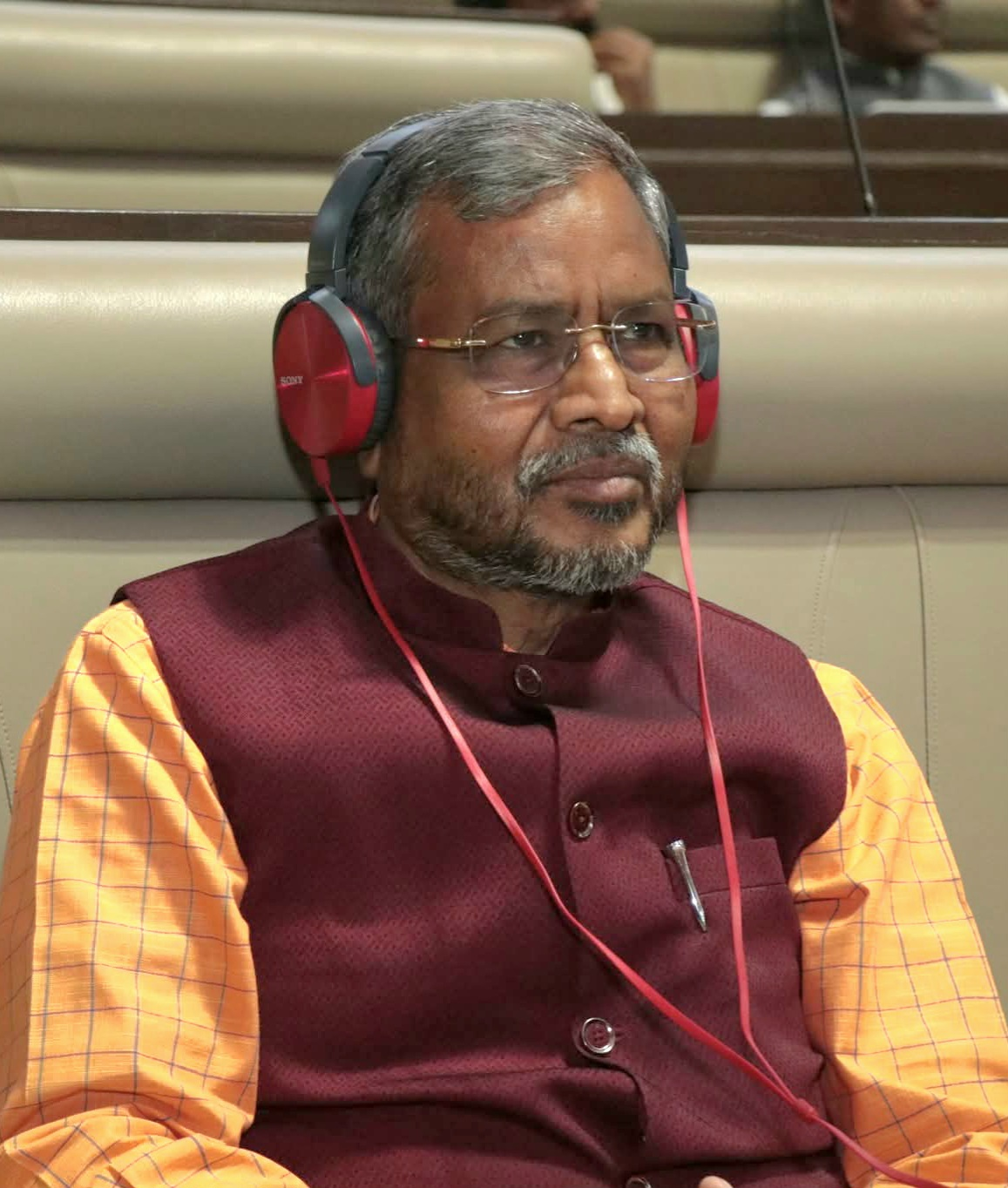

	Majority party	Minority party
Leader	Raghubar Das	Hemant Soren
Party	BJP	JMM
Alliance	NDA
Leader's seat	Jamshedpur East (won)	Barhait (won); Dumka (lost)
Last election	18	18
Seats won	37	19
Seat change	▲19	▲1
Popular vote	43,34,728	28,32,921
Percentage	31.26%	20.43%
Swing	▲11.08%	▲5.23%
	Third party	Fourth party
Leader	Babulal Marandi	Sukhdeo Bhagat
Party	JVM(P)	INC
Leader's seat	Giridih (lost); Dhanwar (lost)	Lohardaga (won)
Last election	11	14
Seats won	8	6
Seat change	▼3	▼8
Popular vote	13,85,080	14,50,640
Percentage	9.99%	10.46%
Swing	▲1.00%	▼5.70%
- Seatwise map of the election results

- Structure of the Jharkhand Legislative Assembly after the election
Chief Minister before election
Hemant Soren
JMM
Elected Chief Minister
Raghubar Das
BJP

The 2014 Jharkhand Legislative Assembly election (Hindi: झारखण्ड विधानसभा चुनाव) was held on 5 phases between 25 November and 20 December 2014 to elect the members of the 4th Jharkhand Legislative Assembly. Results were announced on December 23, 2014. The Bharatiya Janata Party (BJP) won the elections securing 37 seats and defeating The Indian National Congress (INC) and its major allies Rashtriya Janata Dal, Janata Dal (United) and Jharkhand Mukti Morcha (JMM).

The term of the legislative assembly of Jharkhand ended on January 20, 2014. The Chief Election Commissioner announced five-phased assembly elections to be held in Jharkhand along with Jammu and Kashmir beginning January 20.Voter-verified paper audit trail (VVPAT) along with EVMs were used in 7 of the 81 assembly seats. The seven seats were from Jamshedpur East, Jamshedpur West, Bokaro, Dhanbad, Ranchi, Kanke and Hatia.

== Parties and Alliances ==
Party/Alliance		Flag	Electoral symbol	Leader	Seats contested
NDA	Bharatiya Janata Party			Raghubar Das	72
NDA	All Jharkhand Students Union			Sudesh Mahto	8
NDA	Lok Janshakti Party				1
Jharkhand Mukti Morcha				Hemant Soren	79
Jharkhand Vikas Morcha (Prajatantrik)				Babulal Marandi	73
Indian National Congress				Sukhdeo Bhagat	62
Other Parties	Bahujan Samaj Party				61
Other Parties	Rashtriya Janata Dal				19
Other Parties	Trinamool Congress				10
Other Parties	Jharkhand Party				19

== Voting ==
The five stages of the elections were held as follows:

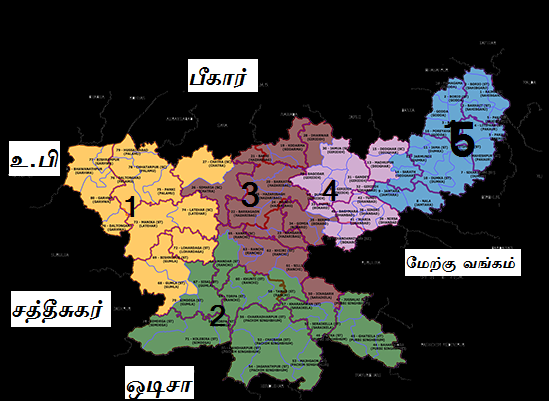
Voting stages

Date	Seats	Turnout
25 November	13	61.92%
2 December	20	65.46%
9 December	17	61%
14 December	15	61.65%
20 December	16	71.25%
Total	81	66.03%

== Results ==
Parties and Coalitions	Popular vote			Seats		
Parties and Coalitions	Vote	%	+/-	Contested	Won	+/-
Bharatiya Janata Party	4,334,728	31.26	▲11.08	72	37	▲19
Jharkhand Mukti Morcha	2,832,921	20.43	▲5.23	79	19	▲1
Jharkhand Vikas Morcha (Prajatantrik)	1,385,080	9.99	▲1.00	73	8	▼3
Indian National Congress	1,450,640	10.46	▼5.7	62	6	▼8
All Jharkhand Students Union	510,277	3.68	▼1.44	8	5	Steady
Bahujan Samaj Party	252,033	1.82		61	1	▲1
Communist Party of India (Marxist–Leninist) Liberation	210,446	1.52		39	1	Steady
Jharkhand Party	153,483	1.11		19	1	Steady
Marxist Co-ordination Committee	141,853	1.02		13	1	Steady
Jai Bharat Samanta Party	110,029	0.79		19	1	Steady
Nav Jawan Sangharsh Morcha	68,121	0.49		9	1	▲1
Rashtriya Janata Dal	433,429	3.13		19	0	▼5
Janata Dal (United)	133,815	0.96		11	0	▼2
Independents	927,840	6.69		363	0	▼2
None of the above	235,039	1.69		81	0	
Total	13,868,225	100.00		1217	81	±0
Valid votes	13,868,225	99.97				
Invalid votes	4,816	0.03				
Votes cast / turnout	13,873,041	66.53				
Abstentions	6,979,767	33.47				
Registered voters	20,852,808					

=== Results by Districts ===
District	Seats						
District	Seats	BJP	JMM	JVM	INC	AJS	OTH
Sahebganj	3	2	1	—N/a	—N/a	—N/a	—N/a
Pakur	3	—N/a	2	—N/a	1	—N/a	—N/a
Dumka	4	1	2	—N/a	1	—N/a	—N/a
Jamtara	2	—N/a	1	—N/a	1	—N/a	—N/a
Deoghar	3	2	—N/a	1	—N/a	—N/a	—N/a
Godda	3	2	—N/a	1	—N/a	—N/a	—N/a
Kodarma	1	1	—N/a	—N/a	—N/a	—N/a	—N/a
Hazaribagh	4	1	1	1	1	—N/a	—N/a
Ramgarh	2	—N/a	—N/a	—N/a	1	1	—N/a
Chatra	2	1	—N/a	1	—N/a	—N/a	—N/a
Giridih	6	4	1	—N/a	—N/a	—N/a	1
Bokaro	4	2	1	1	—N/a	—N/a	—N/a
Dhanbad	6	4	—N/a	—N/a	—N/a	1	1
East Singhbhum	6	4	1	—N/a	—N/a	1	—N/a
Seraikela Kharsawan	3	1	2	—N/a	—N/a	—N/a	—N/a
West Singhbhum	5	—N/a	4	—N/a	—N/a	—N/a	1
Ranchi	7	4	1	1	—N/a	1	—N/a
Khunti	2	1	1	—N/a	—N/a	—N/a	—N/a
Gumla	3	2	1	—N/a	—N/a	—N/a	—N/a
Simdega	2	1	—N/a	—N/a	—N/a	—N/a	1
Lohardaga	1	—N/a	—N/a	—N/a	—N/a	1	—N/a
Latehar	2	1	—N/a	1	—N/a	—N/a	—N/a
Palamu	5	2	—N/a	1	1	—N/a	1
Garhwa	2	1	—N/a	—N/a	—N/a	—N/a	1
Total	81	37	19	8	6	5	6

== Results by constituency ==
Constituency		Winner				Runner Up				Margin	%
#	Name	Candidate	Party	Votes	%	Candidate	Party	Votes	%	Margin	%
1	Rajmahal	Anant Kumar Ojha	BJP	77,481	39.71	Md. Tajuddin	JMM	76,779	39.35	702	0.36
2	Borio (ST)	Tala Marandi	BJP	57,565	36.39	Lobin Hembrom	JMM	56,853	35.94	712	0.45
3	Barhait (ST)	Hemant Soren	JMM	62,515	46.18	Hemlal Murmu	BJP	38,428	28.38	24,087	17.80
4	Littipara (ST)	Dr. Anil Murmu	JMM	67,194	45.93	Simon Marandi	BJP	42,111	28.78	25,083	17.15
5	Pakur	Alamgir Alam	INC	83,338	35.41	Akil Akhtar	JMM	65,272	27.74	18,066	7.67
6	Maheshpur (ST)	Stephen Marandi	JMM	51,866	32.25	Devidhan Tudu	BJP	45,710	28.42	6,156	3.83
7	Shikaripara (ST)	Nalin Soren	JMM	61,901	42.05	Paritosh Soren	JVM	37,400	25.41	24,501	16.64
8	Nala	Rabindra Nath Mahato	JMM	56,131	33.70	Satya Nand Jha	BJP	49,116	29.49	7,015	4.21
9	Jamtara	Irfan Ansari	INC	67,486	35.18	Birendra Mandal	BJP	58,349	30.42	9,137	4.76
10	Dumka (ST)	Louis Marandi	BJP	69,760	44.65	Hemant Soren	JMM	64,846	41.51	4,914	3.14
11	Jama (ST)	Sita Soren	JMM	53,250	39.80	Suresh Murmu	BJP	50,944	38.08	2,306	1.72
12	Jarmundi	Badal Patralekh	INC	43,981	28.83	Hari Narayan Ray	JMM	41,273	27.05	2,708	1.78
13	Madhupur	Raj Paliwar	BJP	74,325	37.34	Hazi Hussain Ansari	JMM	67,441	33.88	6,884	3.46
14	Sarath	Randhir Kumar Singh	JVM	62,717	33.78	Uday Shankar Singh	BJP	48,816	26.29	13,901	7.49
15	Deoghar (SC)	Narayan Das	BJP	92,022	42.42	Suresh Paswan	RJD	46,870	21.60	45,152	20.82
16	Poreyahat	Pradeep Yadav	JVM	64,036	35.51	Devendranath Singh	BJP	52,878	29.33	11,158	6.18
17	Godda	Raghu Nandan Mandal	BJP	87,158	48.71	Sanjay Prasad Yadav	RJD	52,672	29.44	34,486	19.27
18	Mahagama	Ashok Kumar	BJP	70,635	39.28	Shahid Iqbal	JVM	39,075	21.73	31,560	17.55
19	Kodarma	Dr. Neera Yadav	BJP	84,874	42.88	Annpurna Devi	RJD	71,349	36.05	13,525	6.83
20	Barkatha	Janki Prasad Yadav	JVM	63,336	32.53	Amit Kumar Yadav	BJP	55,129	28.31	8,207	4.22
21	Barhi	Manoj Yadav	INC	57,818	33.14	Umashankar Akela	BJP	50,733	29.08	7,085	4.06
22	Barkagaon	Nirmala Devi	INC	61,817	29.24	Roshan Lal Chaudhary	AJSU	61,406	29.05	411	0.19
23	Ramgarh	Chandra Prakash Ch.	AJSU	98,987	49.06	Shahzada Anwar	INC	45,169	22.39	53,818	26.67
24	Mandu	Jai Prakash Bhai Patel	JMM	78,499	34.38	Kumar Mahesh Singh	BJP	71,487	31.31	7,012	3.07
25	Hazaribagh	Manish Jaiswal	BJP	89,675	44.46	Pradip Prasad	IND	62,546	31.01	27,129	13.45
26	Simaria (SC)	Ganesh Ganjhu	JVM	67,404	36.50	Sujeet Kumar Bharati	BJP	51,764	28.03	15,640	8.47
27	Chatra (SC)	Jay Prakash Singh	BJP	69,745	38.34	Satyanand Bhogta	JVM	49,169	27.03	20,576	11.31
28	Dhanwar	Raj Kumar Yadav	CPI(ML)	50,634	28.66	Babulal Marandi	JVM	39,922	22.59	10,712	6.07
29	Bagodar	Nagendra Mahto	BJP	74,898	38.97	Vinod Kumar Singh	CPI(ML)	70,559	36.72	4,339	2.25
30	Jamua (SC)	Kedar Hazra	BJP	56,027	35.32	Satya Narayan Das	JVM	32,927	20.76	23,100	14.56
31	Gandey	Jai Prakash Verma	BJP	48,838	28.90	Salkhan Soren	JMM	38,559	22.81	10,279	6.09
32	Giridih	Nirbhay Shahabadi	BJP	57,450	38.34	Sudivya Kumar	JMM	47,517	31.71	9,933	6.63
33	Dumri	Jagarnath Mahto	JMM	77,984	45.05	Lalchand Mahto	BJP	45,503	26.29	32,481	18.76
34	Gomia	Yogendra Prasad	JMM	97,799	55.25	Madhav Lal Singh	BJP	60,285	34.06	37,514	21.19
35	Bermo	Yogeshwar Mahto	BJP	80,489	42.99	Rajendra Prasad Singh	INC	67,876	36.26	12,613	6.73
36	Bokaro	Biranchi Narayan	BJP	1,14,321	43.38	Samresh Singh	IND	41,678	15.82	72,643	27.56
37	Chandankyari (SC)	Amar Kumar Bauri	JVM	81,925	51.18	Umakant Rajak	AJSU	47,761	29.83	34,164	21.35
38	Sindri	Fulchand Mandal	BJP	58,623	29.01	Anand Mahato	MCO	52,075	25.77	6,548	3.24
39	Nirsa	Arup Chatterjee	MCO	51,581	25.65	Ganesh Mishra	BJP	50,546	25.14	1,035	0.51
40	Dhanbad	Raj Sinha	BJP	1,32,091	58.17	Mannan Mallick	INC	79,094	34.83	52,997	23.34
41	Jharia	Sanjeev Singh	BJP	74,062	48.14	Niraj Singh	INC	40,370	26.24	33,692	21.90
42	Tundi	Raj Kishore Mahato	AJSU	55,466	31.41	Mathura Prasad Mahato	JMM	54,340	30.78	1,126	0.63
43	Baghmara	Dulu Mahato	BJP	86,603	51.65	Jaleshwar Mahato	JD(U)	56,980	33.99	29,623	17.66
44	Baharagora	Kunal Sarangi	JMM	57,973	35.78	Dineshananda Goswami	BJP	42,618	26.30	15,355	9.48
45	Ghatsila (ST)	Laxman Tudu	BJP	52,506	32.48	Ramdas Soren	JMM	46,103	28.52	6,403	3.96
46	Potka (ST)	Maneka Sardar	BJP	68,191	36.69	Sanjib Sardar	JMM	61,485	33.08	6,706	3.61
47	Jugsalai (SC)	Ram Chandra Sahis	AJSU	82,302	40.28	Mangal Kalindi	JMM	57,257	28.02	25,045	12.26
48	Jamshedpur East	Raghubar Das	BJP	1,03,427	61.48	Anand Bihari Dubey	INC	33,270	19.78	70,157	41.70
49	Jamshedpur West	Saryu Roy	BJP	95,346	49.86	Banna Gupta	INC	84,829	44.36	10,517	5.50
50	Ichagarh	Sadhu Charan Mahato	BJP	75,634	42.65	Sabita Mahato	JMM	33,384	18.82	42,250	23.83
51	Saraikella (ST)	Champai Soren	JMM	94,746	45.40	Ganesh Mahali	BJP	93,631	44.86	1,115	0.54
52	Chaibasa (ST)	Deepak Birua	JMM	68,801	48.70	Jyoti Bhramar Tubid	BJP	34,086	24.13	34,715	24.57
53	Majhganon (ST)	Niral Purty	JMM	45,272	35.27	Madhu Kora	JBSP	34,090	26.56	11,182	8.71
54	Jaganathpur (ST)	Geeta Kora	JBSP	48,546	42.84	Mangal Singh Suren	BJP	23,935	21.12	24,611	21.72
55	Manoharpur (ST)	Joba Manjhi	JMM	57,558	45.16	Gurucharan Nayak	BJP	40,989	32.16	16,569	13.00
56	Chakradharpur (ST)	Shashibhushan Samad	JMM	64,396	52.38	Navami Oraon	BJP	37,948	30.86	26,448	21.52
57	Kharasawan (ST)	Dashrath Gagrai	JMM	72,002	49.15	Arjun Munda	BJP	60,036	40.99	11,966	8.16
58	Tamar (ST)	Vikash Kumar Munda	AJSU	57,428	42.87	Gopal Krishna Patar	IND	31,422	23.46	26,006	19.41
59	Torpa (ST)	Paulus Surin	JMM	32,003	30.77	Koche Munda	BJP	31,960	30.73	43	0.04
60	Khunti (ST)	Nilkanth Singh Munda	BJP	47,032	39.25	Jidan Horo	JMM	25,517	21.30	21,515	17.95
61	Silli	Amit Mahto	JMM	79,747	55.71	Sudesh Mahto	AJSU	50,007	34.93	29,740	20.78
62	Khijri (ST)	Ramkumar Pahan	BJP	94,581	52.48	Sundri Devi	INC	29,669	16.46	64,912	36.02
63	Ranchi	C. P. Singh	BJP	95,760	64.38	Mahua Maji	JMM	36,897	24.81	58,863	39.57
64	Hatia	Navin Jaiswal	JVM	88,228	40.45	Seema Sharma	BJP	80,210	36.77	8,018	3.68
65	Kanke (SC)	Dr. Jitu Charan Ram	BJP	1,15,702	55.73	Suresh Kumar Baitha	INC	55,898	26.92	59,804	28.81
66	Mandar (ST)	Gangotri Kujur	BJP	54,200	28.50	Bandhu Tirkey	AITC	46,595	24.50	7,605	4.00
67	Sisai (ST)	Dinesh Oraon	BJP	44,472	31.02	Jiga Susaran Horo	JMM	41,879	29.21	2,593	1.81
68	Gumla (ST)	Shivshankar Oraon	BJP	50,473	38.89	Bhushan Tirkey	JMM	46,441	35.78	4,032	3.11
69	Bishunpur (ST)	Chamra Linda	JMM	55,851	37.95	Samir Oraon	BJP	45,008	30.58	10,843	7.37
70	Simdega (ST)	Vimla Pradhan	BJP	45,343	33.38	Menon Ekka	JKP	42,149	31.03	3,194	2.35
71	Kolebira (ST)	Anosh Ekka	JKP	48,978	39.59	Manoj Nagesiya	BJP	31,835	25.74	17,143	13.85
72	Lohardaga (ST)	Kamal Kishore Bhagat	AJSU	56,920	38.81	Sukhdeo Bhagat	INC	56,328	38.41	592	0.40
73	Manika (ST)	Harikrishna Singh	BJP	31,583	24.70	Ramchandra Singh	RJD	30,500	23.86	1,083	0.84
74	Latehar (SC)	Prakash Ram	JVM	71,189	44.45	Brajmohan Ram	BJP	44,402	27.72	26,787	16.73
75	Panki	Bidesh Singh	INC	41,175	26.23	Shashi Bhushan Mehta	IND	39,180	24.96	1,995	1.27
76	Daltonganj	Alok Chaurasiya	JVM	59,202	29.78	Krishna Nand Tripathi	INC	54,855	27.60	4,347	2.18
77	Bishrampur	R. Chandravanshi	BJP	37,974	22.70	Anju Singh	IND	24,064	14.39	13,910	8.31
78	Chattarpur (SC)	Radha Krishna Kishore	BJP	43,805	30.62	Manoj Kumar	RJD	37,943	26.52	5,862	4.10
79	Hussainabad	Shivpujan Mehta	BSP	57,275	37.00	Kamlesh Kumar Singh	NCP	29,523	19.07	27,752	17.93
80	Garhwa	Satyendra Nath Tiwari	BJP	75,196	36.95	Girinath Singh	RJD	53,441	26.26	21,755	10.69
81	Bhawanathpur	Bhanu Pratap Sahi	NSAM	58,908	27.80	Anant Pratap Deo	BJP	56,247	26.54	2,661	1.26

== Government formation ==
Raghubar Das was sworn in as the 10th chief minister of Jharkhand on 28 December 2014.

On 11 February 2015 six Jharkhand Vikas Morcha (P) MLAs joined the BJP a day after petitioning the Speaker to allow them to sit alongside ruling BJP-led coalition members in the state Assembly.

Naveen Jaiswal (Hatia), Amar Kumar Bauri (Chandankiyari), Ganesh Ganju (Simeria), Alok Kumar Chourasia (Daltonganj), Randhir Singh (Sarath) and Janki Yadav (Barkatha) joined the party at Jharkhand Bhavan in Delhi.

== Bypolls (2014-2019) ==
S.No	Date	Constituency	MLA before election	Party before election	Elected MLA	Party after election
72	14 December 2015	Lohardaga	Kamal Kishore Bhagat	All Jharkhand Students Union	Sukhdeo Bhagat	Indian National Congress
75	16 May 2016	Panki	Bidesh Singh	Indian National Congress	Devendra Kumar Singh	Indian National Congress
17	16 May 2016	Godda	Raghu Nandan Mandal	Bharatiya Janata Party	Amit Kumar Mandal	Bharatiya Janata Party
4	9 April 2017	Litipara	Dr. Anil Murmu	Jharkhand Mukti Morcha	Simon Marandi	Jharkhand Mukti Morcha
34	28 May 2018	Gomia	Yogendra Prasad	Jharkhand Mukti Morcha	Babita Devi	Jharkhand Mukti Morcha
61	28 May 2018	Silli	Amit Kumar	Jharkhand Mukti Morcha	Seema Devi	Jharkhand Mukti Morcha
71	20 December 2018	Kolebira	Anosh Ekka	Jharkhand Party	Naman Bixal Kongari	Indian National Congress

== See also ==
- 2014 elections in India
