= Jamshedpur West Assembly constituency =

Constituency of the Jharkhand legislative assembly in India

Coordinates: 22.793°N 86.112°E

Jamshedpur West
- Constituency No. 49 for the Jharkhand Legislative Assembly

Constituency details
- Country: India
- Region: East India
- State: Jharkhand
- District: East Singhbhum
- Lok Sabha constituency: Jamshedpur
- Established: 1967
- Total electors: 357,169
- Reservation: None

Member of Legislative Assembly
- 5th Jharkhand Legislative Assembly
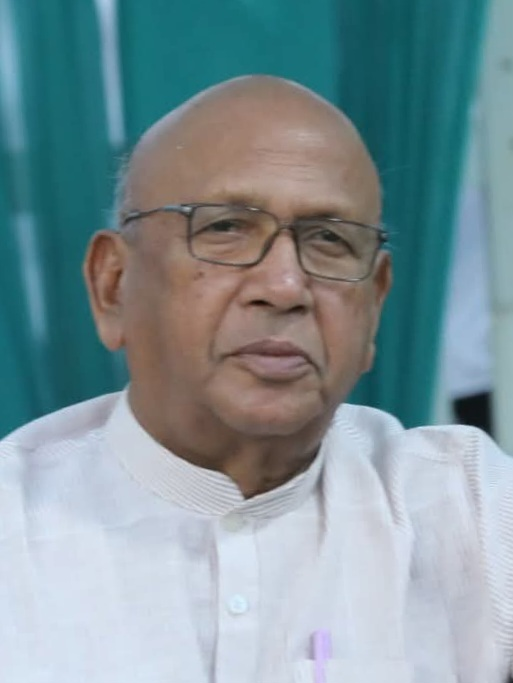
- Incumbent Saryu Roy
- Party: JD(U)
- Alliance: NDA
- Elected year: 2024
- Preceded by: Banna Gupta; INC

Jamshedpur West is one of the assembly constituencies which make up Jamshedpur Lok Sabha seat in the Indian state of Jharkhand. Saryu Roy from Janata Dal (United) is the current MLA of this constituency.

Most successful parties after separate Jharkhand state.
1. BJP (40.0%)
2. INC (40.0%)
3. JD(U) (20.0%)

== Overview ==
According to the Delimitation of Parliamentary and Assembly Constituencies Order, 2008 of the Election Commission of India, Jamshedpur West Assembly constituency covers Jamshdepur Notified Area (excluding ward numbers 20 and 23 to 40). Jamshedpur West Assembly constituency is a part of Jamshedpur (Lok Sabha constituency).

== Members of the Legislative Assembly ==
Year	Name	Party
Bihar Legislative Assembly
Before 1967: see Jamshedpur Assembly constituency
1967	C. Vyas	Indian National Congress
1969	Sunil Mukherjee	Communist Party of India
1972	Ram Avatar Singh	Communist Party of India
1977	Mohd. Ayub Khan	Janata Party
1980	Md. Samsuddin Khan	Indian National Congress (I)
1985	Mrigendra Pratap Singh	Bharatiya Janata Party
1990	Md. Hasan Rizvi	Jharkhand Mukti Morcha
1995	Mrigendra Pratap Singh	Bharatiya Janata Party
2000	Mrigendra Pratap Singh	Bharatiya Janata Party
Jharkhand Legislative Assembly
2005	Saryu Roy	Bharatiya Janata Party
2009	Banna Gupta	Indian National Congress
2014	Saryu Roy	Bharatiya Janata Party
2019	Banna Gupta	Indian National Congress
2024	Saryu Roy	Janata Dal (United)

== Election results ==
=== Assembly election 2024 ===
2024 Jharkhand Legislative Assembly election: Jamshedpur West
Party	Candidate	Votes	%	±%
JD(U)	Saryu Roy	103,631	46.74	New
INC	Banna Gupta	95,768	43.19	▼7.09
AIMIM	Rashid Hussain	4,787	2.16	▼2.00
Independent	Shambhu Nath Choudhary	2,280	1.03	New
Independent	Vikas Singh	2,247	1.01	New
NOTA	None of the Above	1,561	0.70	▼0.28
Margin of victory		7,863	3.55	▼8.19
Turnout		2,21,722	57.29	▲3.40
Registered electors		3,86,988		▲8.35
JD(U) gain from INC		Swing	▼3.54	

=== Assembly election 2019 ===
2019 Jharkhand Legislative Assembly election: Jamshedpur West
Party	Candidate	Votes	%	±%
INC	Banna Gupta	96,778	50.28	▲5.93
BJP	Devendra Nath Singh	74,195	38.55	▼11.30
AIMIM	Reyaz Sharif	8,005	4.16	New
Independent	Naresh Kumar Tandiya	2,949	1.53	New
AAP	Shambhu Nath Choudhary	1,905	0.99	New
AJSU	Brijesh Singh	1,768	0.92	New
JVM(P)	Pankaj Kumar	1,040	0.54	▼0.39
NOTA	None of the Above	1,892	0.98	▲0.36
Margin of victory		22,583	11.73	▲6.23
Turnout		1,92,476	53.89	▼5.78
Registered electors		3,57,169		▲11.42
INC gain from BJP		Swing	▲0.43	

=== Assembly election 2014 ===
2014 Jharkhand Legislative Assembly election: Jamshedpur West
Party	Candidate	Votes	%	±%
BJP	Saryu Roy	95,346	49.85	▲7.24
INC	Banna Gupta	84,829	44.35	▼0.94
JMM	Upendra Singh	2,899	1.52	▼5.00
JVM(P)	Firoz Khan	1,776	0.93	New
BSP	Mahmood Ali	1,120	0.59	New
NOTA	None of the Above	1,200	0.63	New
Margin of victory		10,517	5.50	▲2.81
Turnout		1,91,278	59.67	▲17.52
Registered electors		3,20,568		▲10.00
BJP gain from INC		Swing	▲4.55	

=== Assembly election 2009 ===
2009 Jharkhand Legislative Assembly election: Jamshedpur West
Party	Candidate	Votes	%	±%
INC	Banna Gupta	55,638	45.29	▲32.17
BJP	Saryu Roy	52,341	42.61	▲10.32
JMM	Mohan Karmakar	8,002	6.51	New
RJD	Firoz Khan	2,030	1.65	▼2.15
Margin of victory		3,297	2.68	▼5.96
Turnout		1,22,839	42.15	▼5.85
Registered electors		2,91,414		▼4.75
INC gain from BJP		Swing	▲13.00	

=== Assembly election 2005 ===
2005 Jharkhand Legislative Assembly election: Jamshedpur West
Party	Candidate	Votes	%	±%
BJP	Saryu Roy	47,428	32.29	▼12.83
SP	Banna Gupta	34,733	23.65	▲3.04
LJP	Hedayatullah Khan	34,124	23.23	New
INC	Ayesha Ahmad	19,269	13.12	▼7.58
RJD	Mrigendra Pratap Singh	5,588	3.80	New
AITC	Ashok Ku Patro	1,131	0.77	New
Independent	Siya Sharan Sharma	1,122	0.76	New
Margin of victory		12,695	8.64	▼15.78
Turnout		1,46,865	48.00	▲1.06
Registered electors		3,05,950		▲31.16
BJP hold		Swing	▼12.83	

=== Assembly election 2000 ===
2000 Bihar Legislative Assembly election: Jamshedpur West
Party	Candidate	Votes	%	±%
BJP	Mrigendra Pratap Singh	49,413	45.13	New
INC	Shamsudin Khan	22,669	20.70	New
SP	Banna Gupta	22,568	20.61	New
JMM	Syed Naushad	10,849	9.91	New
SJP(R)	Ayub Khan	1,444	1.32	New
SS	Deepak Kumar Agrawal	1,004	0.92	New
Independent	Sekhar Bhusan Nag	647	0.59	New
Margin of victory		26,744	24.42	
Turnout		1,09,499	47.30	
Registered electors		2,33,258		
BJP win (new seat)				

== See also ==
- Vidhan Sabha
- List of states of India by type of legislature
- Jamshedpur East Assembly constituency
- Jamshedpur Assembly constituency
