= Saryu Roy =

Indian politician

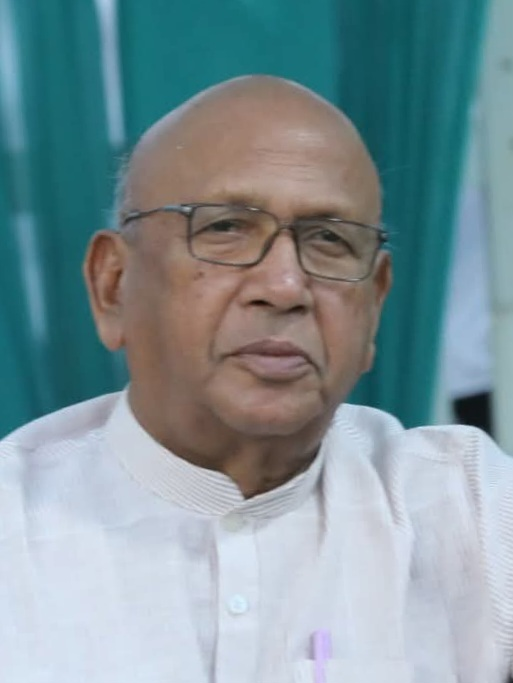

Member of Jharkhand Legislative Assembly
- Incumbent
- Assumed office 23 November 2024
- Preceded by: Banna Gupta
- Constituency: Jamshedpur West
- In office 2014–2019
- Preceded by: Banna Gupta
- Succeeded by: Banna Gupta
- Constituency: Jamshedpur West
- In office 23 December 2019 – 23 November 2024
- Preceded by: Raghubar Das
- Succeeded by: Purnima Das Sahu
- Constituency: Jamshedpur East
- In office 2005–2009
- Preceded by: Mrigendra Pratap Singh
- Succeeded by: Banna Gupta
- Constituency: Jamshedpur West

Cabinet Minister, Government of Jharkhand
- In office 2014–2019
- Chief Minister: Raghubar Das
- Ministries: Ministry of Parliamentary Affairs, Food, Public Distribution and Consumer Affairs

Personal details
- Born: 16 July 1951 (age 75) Buxar, Bihar, India
- Party: Janata Dal (United) (2024-present)
- Other political affiliations: Independent (2019-2024); Bharatiya Janata Party (until 2019)
- Education: Patna University
- Occupation: Politician
- Website: Official Website

Saryu Roy (born 16 July 1951) is an Indian politician, who was formerly a BJP leader in Bihar and Jharkhand. He left BJP before 2019 assembly elections in Jharkhand, and won as an independent from Jamshedpur East, defeating the incumbent Chief Minister Raghubar Das.

== Career ==
He served as a Minister of Food and Supply Department in the BJP led government in the state of Jharkhand. He was elected to Jharkhand assembly in December 2014 from Jamshedpur-West constituency for the second time after defeating his nearest rival Banna Gupta by a margin of over 10,000 votes.

He was first elected as an MLA from Jamshedpur-West constituency in 2005. He lost the 2009 assembly seat by a narrow margin of around 3000 votes to the then INC candidate Banna Gupta. Prior to this, in the undivided Bihar he served as an MLC for a six-year term from 1998 to 2004.

On 4 August 2024, he joined Janata Dal (United) in the presence of Sanjay Kumar Jha in Patna. He was elected as an MLA from Jamshedpur-West constituency in 2024 on JD(U) ticket.

== Electoral history ==
=== Legislative Assembly elections ===
Year	Constituency	Party	Votes	%	Result
2005	Jamshedpur West	BJP	47,428	32.29	Won
2009	Jamshedpur West	BJP	52,341	42.61	Lost
2014	Jamshedpur West	BJP	95,346	49.85	Won
2019	Jamshedpur East	Independent	73,945	42.59	Won
2024	Jamshedpur West	JD(U)	103,631	46.74	Won
