= Ram Avatar Singh =

Indian politician

Ram Avatar Singh (died 23 December 2011) was an Indian politician and leader of Communist Party of India. He represented Jamshedpur constituency from 1962 to 1967 and Jamshedpur West constituency from 1972 to 1977.
