= Panki Assembly constituency =

Constituency of the Jharkhand legislative assembly in India

Coordinates: 24.036°N 84.477°E

Panki
- Constituency No. 75 for the Jharkhand Legislative Assembly

Constituency details
- Country: India
- Region: East India
- State: Jharkhand
- District: Palamu district
- Established: 2000
- Reservation: None

Member of Legislative Assembly
- 5th Jharkhand Legislative Assembly
- Incumbent Kushwaha Shashi Bhushan Mehta
- Party: BJP
- Elected year: 2024

Panki Assembly constituency is an assembly constituency in the Indian state of Jharkhand. Panki city is situated on Daltonganj to Balumath State highway, in the district Palamu Jharkhand.

== Members of the Legislative Assembly ==
Election	Name	Party
Bihar Legislative Assembly
Before 1962: Constituency did not exist
1962	Lal Jagdhatri Nath Shah Deo	Swatantra Party
1967	Ramdeo Ram	Bharatiya Jana Sangh
1969	Ramdeo Ram	Bharatiya Jana Sangh
1972	Naldeo Ram	Indian National Congress
1977	Mohan Singh	Janata Party
1980	Sankteshwar Singh	Indian National Congress
1985	Sankteshwar Singh	Indian National Congress
1990	Madhu Singh	Independent politician
1995	Sankteshwar Singh	Independent politician
2000	Madhu Singh	Samata Party
Jharkhand Legislative Assembly
2005	Bidesh Singh (Note: Bidesh Singh died of cardiac arrest on 28 March 2016.)	Rashtriya Janata Dal
2009	Bidesh Singh	Independent politician
2014	Bidesh Singh	Indian National Congress
2016^	Devendra Kumar Singh	Indian National Congress
2019	Kushwaha Shashi Bhushan Mehta	Bharatiya Janata Party

^by-election

== Election results ==
=== Assembly election 2024 ===
2024 Jharkhand Legislative Assembly election: Panki
Party	Candidate	Votes	%	±%
BJP	Kushwaha Shashi Bhushan Mehta	75,991	35.19%	▼17.19
Independent	Devendra Kumar Singh	66,195	30.66%	New
INC	Lal Suraj	27,446	12.71%	▼18.76
ASP(KR)	Mumtaj Ahmad Khan	22,990	10.65%	New
Independent	Binod Kumar	6,121	2.83%	New
BSP	Jitendra Kumar	2,702	1.25%	▲0.04
Independent	Ritesh Kumar Gupta	2,189	1.01%	New
NOTA	None of the Above	3,921	1.82%	▲0.99
Margin of victory		9,796	4.54%	▼16.37
Turnout		2,15,928	66.18%	▼0.46
Registered electors		3,26,288		▲22.22
BJP hold		Swing	▼17.19	

=== Assembly election 2019 ===
2019 Jharkhand Legislative Assembly election: Panki
Party	Candidate	Votes	%	±%
BJP	Kushwaha Shashi Bhushan Mehta	93,184	52.38%	▲29.02
INC	Devendra Kumar Singh	55,994	31.47%	▼5.05
Independent	Mumtaz Ahmad Khan	9,419	5.29%	New
Independent	Sumit Kumar Yadav	4,243	2.39%	New
Independent	Rajan Kumar	3,496	1.97%	New
CPI	Puranchand Saw	2,786	1.57%	▼0.46
BSP	Md. Alam	2,163	1.22%	New
NOTA	None of the Above	1,475	0.83%	▼2.11
Margin of victory		37,190	20.90%	▲18.60
Turnout		1,77,902	66.64%	▲4.78
Registered electors		2,66,961		▲7.05
BJP gain from INC		Swing	▲15.85	

=== Assembly by-election 2016 ===
2016 Jharkhand Legislative Assembly by-election: Panki
Party	Candidate	Votes	%	±%
INC	Devendra Kumar Singh	56,343	36.53%	▲10.32
JMM	Kushwaha Shashi Bhushan Mehta	52,785	34.22%	▲19.66
BJP	Lal Suraj	36,028	23.36%	▲4.86
CPI	Kavita Singh	3,129	2.03%	▲0.53
Independent	Mudrika Oraon	1,712	1.11%	New
Independent	Bina Bhuiya	1,428	0.93%	New
Independent	Dhananjay Singh	1,371	0.89%	New
NOTA	Nota	4,530	2.94%	New
Margin of victory		3,558	2.31%	▲1.04
Turnout		1,54,257	63.67%	▼3.46
Registered electors		2,49,380		▲3.66
INC hold		Swing	▲10.32	

=== Assembly election 2014 ===
2014 Jharkhand Legislative Assembly election: Panki
Party	Candidate	Votes	%	±%
INC	Bidesh Singh	41,175	26.20%	New
Independent	Kushwaha Shashi Bhushan Mehta	39,180	24.93%	New
BJP	Amit Kumar Tiwari	29,058	18.49%	New
JMM	Lal Suraj	22,882	14.56%	▲12.54
Independent	Paras Thakur	3,595	2.29%	New
Independent	Jayram Oraon	3,110	1.98%	New
CPI	Manajrul Haque	2,358	1.50%	New
Margin of victory		1,995	1.27%	▼16.92
Turnout		1,57,148	65.32%	▲6.68
Registered electors		2,40,584		▲26.93
INC gain from Independent		Swing	▼8.40	

=== Assembly election 2009 ===
2009 Jharkhand Legislative Assembly election: Panki
Party	Candidate	Votes	%	±%
Independent	Bidesh Singh	38,458	34.60%	New
JD(U)	Madhu Singh	18,240	16.41%	▲12.83
Independent	Shashi Bhushan Prakash Mehta	11,297	10.16%	New
RJD	Keshwar Yadav	8,772	7.89%	▼23.50
AJSU	Iftekhar Ahmed Khan	8,015	7.21%	New
Communist Party of India (Marxist Leninist) Liberation	Kavita Singh	6,921	6.23%	▼10.37
JMM	Surendra Yadav	2,248	2.02%	▼1.20
Margin of victory		20,218	18.19%	▲3.40
Turnout		1,11,140	58.64%	▲1.58
Registered electors		1,89,543		▼21.70
Independent gain from RJD		Swing	▲3.21	

=== Assembly election 2005 ===
2005 Jharkhand Legislative Assembly election: Panki
Party	Candidate	Votes	%	±%
RJD	Bidesh Singh	43,350	31.39%	▲24.70
Communist Party of India (Marxist Leninist) Liberation	Vishwanath Singh	22,928	16.60%	▲7.04
Independent	Madhu Singh	16,729	12.11%	New
JD(U)	Ramdeo Prasad Yadav	4,943	3.58%	New
JMM	Ishwari Prasad	4,447	3.22%	New
BSP	Rajdeo Ravidas	2,741	1.98%	▼5.44
LJSP	Shashi Bhushan Prakash Mehta	2,591	1.88%	New
Margin of victory		20,422	14.79%	▲14.73
Turnout		1,38,102	57.05%	▲12.62
Registered electors		2,42,063		▲55.77
RJD gain from SAP		Swing	▲6.63	

=== Assembly election 2000 ===
2000 Bihar Legislative Assembly election: Panki
Party	Candidate	Votes	%	±%
SAP	Madhu Singh	17,095	24.76%	New
Independent	Videsh Singh	17,058	24.70%	New
INC	Sankateshwar Singh	7,205	10.43%	New
Communist Party of India (Marxist Leninist) Liberation	Vishwanath Singh	6,601	9.56%	New
BSP	Ganesh Mahato	5,129	7.43%	New
RJD	Paramdeo Singh	4,622	6.69%	New
Independent	Md. Alam	4,250	6.16%	New
Margin of victory		37	0.05%	
Turnout		69,047	45.67%	
Registered electors		1,55,397		
SAP win (new seat)				

== See also ==
- Vidhan Sabha
- Jharkhand Legislative Assembly
- List of states of India by type of legislature
- Panki, Jharkhand
- List of constituencies of the Jharkhand Legislative Assembly
