= Jamshedpur Assembly constituency =

Former constituency of the Bihar legislative assembly in India

Coordinates: 22.799°N 86.215°E

Jamshedpur
- Former constituency for the Bihar Legislative Assembly

Constituency details
- Country: India
- Region: East India
- State: Bihar
- Lok Sabha constituency: Jamshedpur
- Established: 1952
- Abolished: 1967

Jamshedpur Assembly constituency was one of the assembly constituencies which made up Jamshedpur Lok Sabha seat in the Indian state of Bihar (now in Jharkhand).

== Members of the Legislative Assembly ==
Election	Name	Party
1952	Sheo Chandrika Prasad	Indian National Congress
1957	Kedar Das	Communist Party of India
1962	Ram Avatar Singh	Communist Party of India

This constituency was split as East and West segments from 1967 onwards. So, for Elections after 1962, please see Jamshedpur East Assembly constituency and Jamshedpur West Assembly constituency

== See also ==
- Jamshedpur East Assembly constituency
- Jamshedpur West Assembly constituency
- List of states of India by type of legislature
- Vidhan Sabha
