= Purnima Sahu =

Indian politician (born 1994)

Purnima Sahu Das
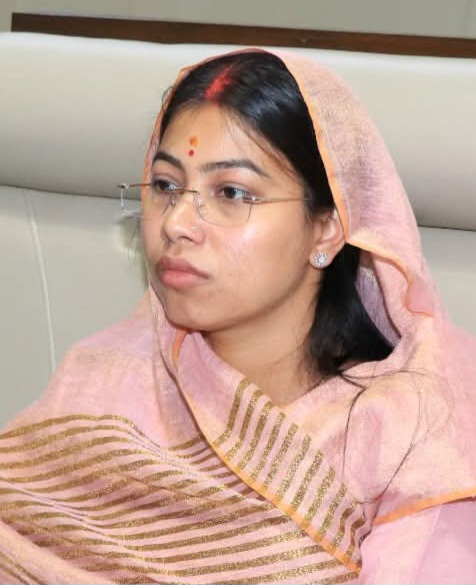

Member of the Jharkhand Legislative Assembly
- Incumbent
- Assumed office 2024
- Constituency: Jamshedpur East

Personal details
- Born: Purnima Sahu; 1994 Chhattisgarh, India
- Party: Bharatiya Janata Party
- Spouse: Lalit Kumar Das
- Relatives: Raghubar Das (father-in-law)
- Education: Graduate, Post-Graduate Diploma
- Alma mater: Gurukul Mahila Mahabidyalaya, Raipur
- Occupation: Politician

Purnima Sahu Das (born 1994) is an Indian politician from Jharkhand. She is a member of the Jharkhand Legislative Assembly from Jamshedpur East Assembly constituency in East Singhbhum district. She won the 2024 Jharkhand Legislative Assembly election, representing the Bharatiya Janata Party.

== Early life and education ==
Sahu was born in Chhattisgarh and is the daughter in law of Raghubar Das, former chief minister of Jharkhand. She married Lalit Kumar Das, the son of Raghubar Das. She is a graduate, and she also did a post-graduate diploma in 2017 at Gurukul Mahila Mahabidyalaya, Raipur.

== Career ==
Sahu was elected in her debut election in the Jamshedpur East Assembly constituency representing Bharatiya Janata Party in the 2024 Jharkhand Legislative Assembly election. She polled 1,07,191 votes and defeated her nearest rival, Ajoy Kumar of the Indian National Congress, by a margin of 42,871 votes.
