= Kedar Das =

Indian politician

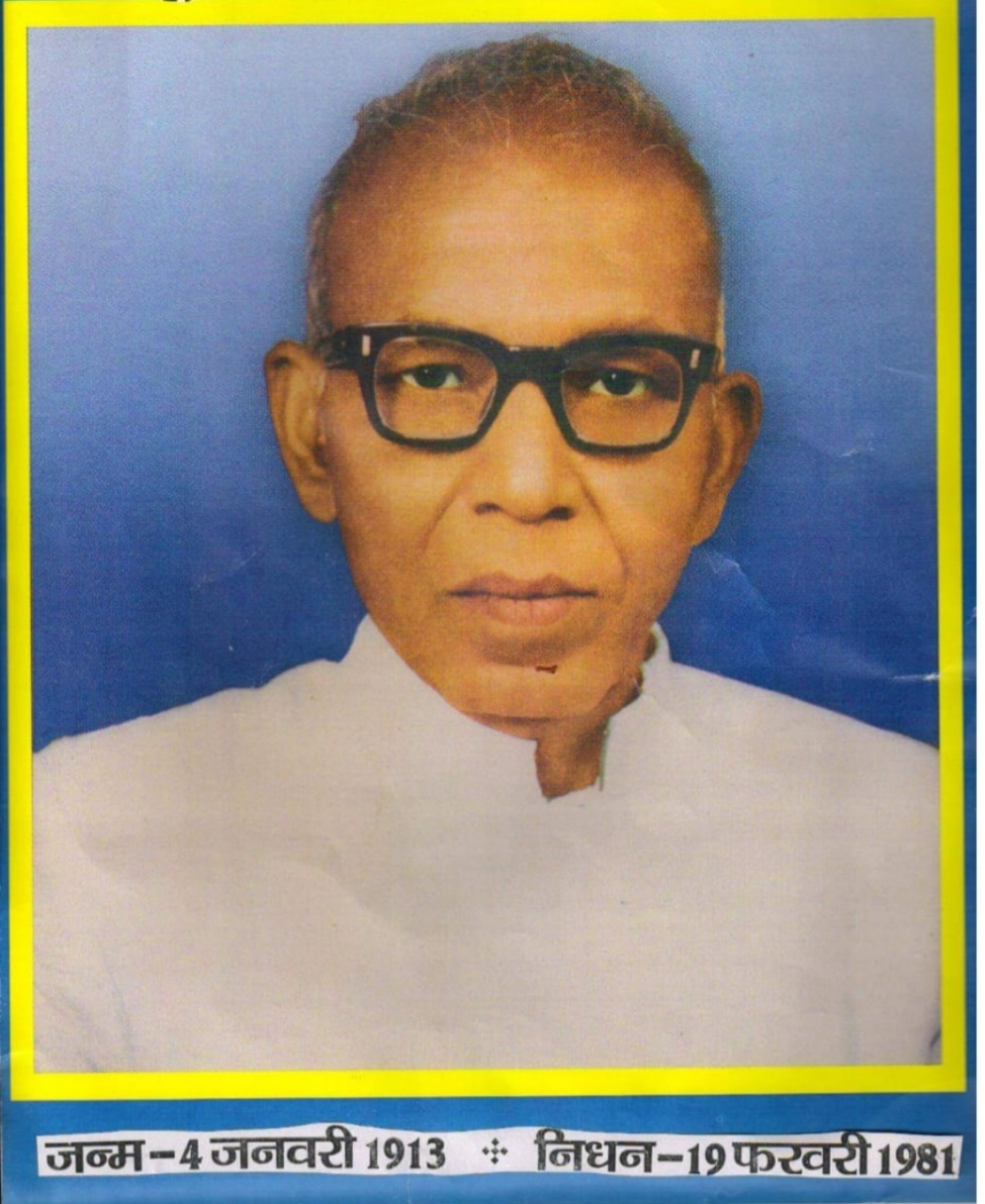
Portrait of Kedar Das at the AITUC Bihar office (Kedar Bhawan), Patna

Kedar Das was an Indian politician and leader of Communist Party of India. He represented Jamshedpur constituency from 1957 to 1962 and Jamshedpur East constituency from 1969 to 1977. The Kedar Das Institute for Labour and Social Studies, a social research institute based in Patna, is named in his honour.

A book titled Kedar Das and the Labour Movement, edited by Anish Ankur, was released on 19 June 2025 at Janshakti Bhawan, Patna, chronicling his life and contributions to the labour movement.
