= Kedar Das Institute for Labour and Social Studies =

Labour and social studies research institute in Patna, India

- केदार दास श्रम एवं समाज अध्ययन संस्थान
- Purpose: Research, training and awareness on labour and social issues
- Headquarters: Kedar Bhawan, Adalatganj Patna, Bihar, India
- Key people: Naveen Chandra (Secretary-General)

Kedar Das Institute for Labour and Social Studies (KDILSS) is a social research institute based in Patna, Bihar, India. The institute conducts research, training programs, and public awareness activities related to labour rights, social policies, and community issues.The institute is named after Kedar Das. a prominent trade union leader from Jamshedpur associated with the Communist movement. Chaturanan Mishra, a trade union leader, former president of the All India Trade Union Congress (AITUC) and former Union minister, served as the Founder General Secretary of the institute. Naveen Chandra is the current General Secretary of the institute. Its headquarters is located at Kedar Bhawan, Adalatganj Patna.

The institute has organized several training programs, workshops, and seminars. In collaboration with the Tata Institute of Social Sciences (TISS), it has conducted training programs for trade union organizers. The institute has also participated in public discussions on education, budget, and social policy issues.

As part of the centenary celebrations of the Russian Revolution, the institute hosted a talk by Norwegian sociologist and Marxist thinker Prof. Alf Gunvald Nilsen on the topic “Right-wing Populism and the Crisis of Neo-liberalism” at Patna. The event was attended by prominent communist leaders, social activists, and intellectuals from the region, providing a platform for discussion on labour and social issues.
