= Dinanath Pandey =

Indian politician (died 2019)

Bihar Legislative Assembly
- In office 1977–1985
- Preceded by: Kedar Das
- Succeeded by: Darayus Nariman
- Constituency: Jamshedpur East
- In office 1990–1995
- Preceded by: Darayus Nariman
- Succeeded by: Raghubar Das
- Constituency: Jamshedpur East

Personal details
- Born: 1933/34
- Died: 11 January 2019 (aged 85)
- Party: Bharatiya Janata Party

Dinanath Pandey was an Indian politician belonging to Bharatiya Janata Party. He was elected as a member of the Bihar Legislative Assembly from Jamshedpur East in 1977, 1980 and 1990. He died on 11 January 2019 at the age of 85.
