= Jamshedpur East Assembly constituency =

Vidhan Sabha constituency in Jharkhand

Coordinates: 22.814°N 86.274°E

Jamshedpur East
- Constituency No. 48 for the Jharkhand Legislative Assembly

Constituency details
- Country: India
- Region: East India
- State: Jharkhand
- District: East Singhbhum
- Lok Sabha constituency: Jamshedpur
- Established: 1967
- Total electors: 304,972
- Reservation: None

Member of Legislative Assembly
- 5th Jharkhand Legislative Assembly
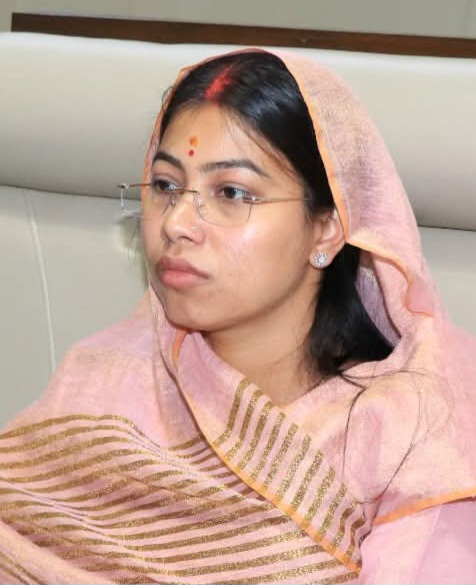
- Incumbent Purnima Das Sahu
- Party: BJP
- Alliance: NDA
- Elected year: 2024

Jamshedpur East Assembly constituency is one of the assembly constituencies which make up Jamshedpur Lok Sabha seat in the Indian state of Jharkhand.

Most successful parties after separate Jharkhand state.
1. BJP (80.0%)
2. Independent (20.0%)

== Overview ==
According to the Delimitation of Parliamentary and Assembly Constituencies Order, 2008 of the Election Commission of India, Jamshedpur East Assembly constituency covers ward numbers 20 and 23 to 40 in Jamshdepur Notified Area. Jamshedpur East (Vidhan Sabha constituency) is a part of Jamshedpur (Lok Sabha constituency).

== Members of Legislative Assembly ==
Election	Name	Party
Bihar Legislative Assembly
Before 1967: see Jamshedpur Assembly constituency
1967	M. J. Akhauri	Indian National Congress
1969	Kedar Das	Communist Party of India
1972	Kedar Das	Communist Party of India
1977	Dina Nath Pandey	Janata Party
1980	Dina Nath Pandey	Bharatiya Janata Party
1985	Darayus Nariman	Indian National Congress
1990	Dina Nath Pandey	Bharatiya Janata Party
1995	Raghubar Das	Bharatiya Janata Party
2000	Raghubar Das	Bharatiya Janata Party
Jharkhand Legislative Assembly
2005	Raghubar Das	Bharatiya Janata Party
2009	Raghubar Das	Bharatiya Janata Party
2014	Raghubar Das	Bharatiya Janata Party
2019	Saryu Roy	Independent
2024	Purnima Sahu	Bharatiya Janata Party

== Election results ==
=== Assembly election 2024 ===
2024 Jharkhand Legislative Assembly election: Jamshedpur East
Party	Candidate	Votes	%	±%
BJP	Purnima Sahu	107,191	54.39%	▲20.91
INC	Ajoy Kumar	64,320	32.63%	▲21.70
Independent	Shiv Shankar Singh	15,471	7.85%	New
JLKM	Tarun Kumar Dey	1,909	0.97%	New
NOTA	None of the Above	1,259	0.64%	▼0.06
Margin of victory		42,871	21.75%	▲12.63
Turnout		1,97,096	58.59%	▲1.66
Registered electors		3,36,423		▲10.31
BJP gain from Independent		Swing	▲11.79	

=== Assembly election 2019 ===
2019 Jharkhand Legislative Assembly election: Jamshedpur East
Party	Candidate	Votes	%	±%
Independent	Saryu Roy	73,945	42.59%	New
BJP	Raghubar Das	58,112	33.47%	▼27.99
INC	Gourav Vallabh	18,976	10.93%	▼8.84
JVM(P)	Abhay Singh	11,772	6.78%	▼5.59
Independent	Gopal Lohar	2,425	1.40%	New
Independent	Banty Kumar Singh	959	0.55%	New
Independent	Dharmendra Kumar Singh	925	0.53%	New
NOTA	None of the Above	1,211	0.70%	▼0.30
Margin of victory		15,833	9.12%	▼32.57
Turnout		1,73,618	56.93%	▼3.97
Registered electors		3,04,972		▲10.37
Independent gain from BJP		Swing	▼18.87	

=== Assembly election 2014 ===
2014 Jharkhand Legislative Assembly election: Jamshedpur East
Party	Candidate	Votes	%	±%
BJP	Raghubar Das	103,427	61.46%	▲11.17
INC	Anand Bihari Dubey	33,270	19.77%	New
JVM(P)	Abhay Singh	20,815	12.37%	▼17.36
JMM	Kamaljeet Kaur Gill	3,987	2.37%	▼1.99
Independent	Manjeet Singh	881	0.52%	New
NOTA	None of the Above	1,674	0.99%	New
Margin of victory		70,157	41.69%	▲21.13
Turnout		1,68,271	60.90%	▲15.75
Registered electors		2,76,309		▲11.69
BJP hold		Swing	▲11.17	

=== Assembly election 2009 ===
2009 Jharkhand Legislative Assembly election : Jamshedpur East
Party	Candidate	Votes	%	±%
BJP	Raghubar Das	56,165	50.29%	▼2.67
JVM(P)	Abhay Singh	33,202	29.73%	New
Independent	Anand Bihari Dubey	10,944	9.80%	New
JMM	Pramod Lal	4,864	4.36%	New
Independent	Sanjay Kumar Thakur	1,184	1.06%	New
AJSU	Ashok Kumar Pandey	934	0.84%	New
RJD	Rajendra Kumar Singh	916	0.82%	▼1.51
Margin of victory		22,963	20.56%	▲5.60
Turnout		1,11,682	45.14%	▲0.43
Registered electors		2,47,387		▼10.02
BJP hold		Swing	▼2.67	

=== Assembly election 2005 ===
2005 Jharkhand Legislative Assembly election: Jamshedpur East
Party	Candidate	Votes	%	±%
BJP	Raghubar Das	65,116	52.96%	▼10.94
INC	Ramashray Prasad	46,718	38.00%	▲17.66
RJD	Indrajit Singh Kalra	2,867	2.33%	▼6.55
SP	E. Shashi Kumar	1,547	1.26%	New
LJP	Tarkeshwar Tiwary	1,034	0.84%	New
Independent	Shiv Prasann Pandey	991	0.81%	New
JPP	Alpana Bose	908	0.74%	New
Margin of victory		18,398	14.96%	▼28.60
Turnout		1,22,947	44.72%	▼5.33
Registered electors		2,74,948		▲24.98
BJP hold		Swing	▼10.94	

=== Assembly election 2000 ===
2000 Bihar Legislative Assembly election: Jamshedpur East
Party	Candidate	Votes	%	±%
BJP	Raghubar Das	70,358	63.90%	New
INC	K. P. Singh	22,395	20.34%	New
RJD	Radhe Prasad Yadav	9,785	8.89%	New
JMM	Shailendra Singh	4,854	4.41%	New
CPI	Shankar Dayal Singh	1,818	1.65%	New
Margin of victory		47,963	43.56%	
Turnout		1,10,109	50.50%	
Registered electors		2,19,997		
BJP win (new seat)				

== See also ==
- Vidhan Sabha
- List of states of India by type of legislature
- Jamshedpur West Assembly constituency
- Jamshedpur Assembly constituency
