= Mrigendra Pratap Singh =

Indian politician

Mrigendra Pratap Singh was an Indian politician who served as Speaker and Member of Jharkhand Legislative Assembly from Jamshedpur West Assembly constituency and Minister of Finance in Cabinet of Jharkhand.

== Personal life ==
He was the child of Harihar Singh and elder brother of Amrendra Pratap Singh. He died on 24 March 2005, at Tata Main Hospital.
