= Pradip Prasad =

Indian politician

Member of the Jharkhand Legislative Assembly

Pradip Prasad (born 1974) is an Indian politician from Jharkhand. He is an MLA from Hazaribagh Assembly constituency in Hazaribagh District. He won the 2024 Jharkhand Legislative Assembly election, representing the Bharatiya Janata Party.

== Early life and education ==
Prasad is from Hazaribagh, Jharkhand. He is the son of Bhagirath Prasad. He completed his B.A. Honours in 1989 at St. Columba's College, Hazaribagh, which is affiliated with Ranchi University, Ranchi.

== Career ==
Prasad won from Hazaribagh Assembly constituency representing the Bharatiya Janata Party in the 2024 Jharkhand Legislative Assembly election. He polled 1,39,458 votes and defeated his nearest rival, Munna Singh of the Indian National Congress, by a margin of 43,477 votes. He first contested the 2014 Jharkhand Legislative Assembly election as an independent but lost to Manish Jaiswal of the BJP by a margin of 27,129 votes. In 2014, he polled 62,546 votes against Jaiswal's 89,675 votes.
