= Raghubar Das =

Indian politician (born 1955)

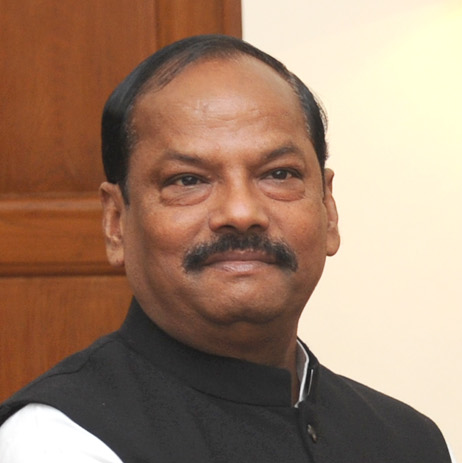
- Das in 2021

27th Governor of Odisha
- In office 31 October 2023 – 2 January 2025
- Chief Minister: Naveen Patnaik; Mohan Charan Majhi
- Preceded by: Ganeshi Lal
- Succeeded by: Kambhampati Hari Babu

6th Chief Minister of Jharkhand
- In office 28 December 2014 – 29 December 2019
- Governor: Syed Ahmed; Droupadi Murmu
- Preceded by: Hemant Soren
- Succeeded by: Hemant Soren

Deputy Chief Minister of Jharkhand
- In office 30 December 2009 – 29 May 2010 Serving with Sudesh Mahto
- Chief Minister: Shibu Soren
- Preceded by: President's rule
- Succeeded by: President's rule

Member of Jharkhand Legislative Assembly
- In office 1995 – 23 December 2019
- Preceded by: Dinanath Pandey
- Succeeded by: Saryu Rai
- Constituency: Jamshedpur East

Personal details
- Born: 3 May 1955 (age 71) Rajnandgaon, Madhya Pradesh (present-day Chhattisgarh), India
- Party: Bharatiya Janata Party
- Spouse: Rukmini Devi
- Children: 2
- Education: Jamshedpur Co-operative College, Jamshedpur; Ranchi University

Raghubar Das (born 3 May 1955) is an Indian politician who has served as the 6th chief minister of Jharkhand from 2014 to 2019. He also later served as 26th governor of Odisha since 2023 until 2025. He is a member of the Bharatiya Janata Party (BJP) and has twice served as the president of BJP Jharkhand.

A former employee of Tata Steel, he served as the member of legislative assembly five times, he represented Jamshedpur East from 1995 to 2019. He also served as the deputy chief minister and the urban development minister during the BJP-led government in the state. At one point during his tenure, he was imprisoned. He is the first chief minister of the state to have completed a full term.

== Early life ==
He was born on 3 May 1955 to Chavan Ram in Boirdih village of Chhuriya tehsil in Rajnandgaon district. He graduated from Bhalubasa Harijan High School and completed B.Sc. from Jamshedpur Cooperative College. He also studied law from the same college and acquired LLB degree. After studies, he joined Tata Steel as a legal professional. He is a former Rashtriya Swayamsevak Sangh functionary.

== Political career ==
Das was involved in politics since his college days. He participated in Jayprakash Narayan-led Total Revolution movement in the state. He was arrested and imprisoned in Gaya and was again imprisoned during the Emergency imposed by Indira Gandhi. Subsequently, Das joined the Janata Party in 1977.

Later he joined Bharatiya Janata Party (BJP) as a founding member in 1980. He participated in the first National Committee meeting of BJP in Mumbai in 1980. He was appointed the chief of unit of Sitaramdera in Jamshedpur. Later he served as the city chief secretary and the vice-president of Jamshedpur, BJP secretary and then became the vice-president.

He was elected as the member of Bihar Legislative Assembly in 1995 from Jamshedpur East. He again won from the same constituency five times. He was appointed a chief of BJP in Jharkhand in 2004. The BJP won 30 seats in Jharkhand Legislative Assembly election, 2005. He also served as the Urban Development Minister during the NDA government in 2005 under Arjun Munda as the chief minister. He also led the 2009 Indian general election in the state. He held the office of deputy chief minister of Jharkhand state from 30 December 2009 to 29 May 2010, when Shibu Soren was the chief minister.

He was also appointed the vice-president in the National Committee of BJP on 16 August 2014. He has shown assets to the tune of around Rs. 21 lakh. When BJP secured majority in 2014 Jharkhand Legislative Assembly election, he became the sixth and the first non-tribal chief minister of the state on 28 December 2014.

In the 2019 Jharkhand Legislative Assembly election elections held in December, BJP under his leadership managed to win only 25 seats out of 81 assembly seats against the JMM alliance and had to resign. He lost to Saryu Rai, an ex-leader of BJP, who was an independent candidate from the Jamshedpur east constituency with more than 15,000 votes.

In October 2023, Das was appointed Governor of Odisha. In December 2024, Das resigned as the governor of Odisha, indicating a political comeback after the defeat of the BJP in the 2024 Jharkhand Legislative Assembly election.

== Electoral history ==
=== Legislative Assembly elections ===
Year	Constituency	Party	Votes	%	Result
1995	Jamshedpur East	BJP	26,880	22.10	Won
2000	Jamshedpur East	BJP	70,358	63.90	Won
2005	Jamshedpur East	BJP	65,116	52.96	Won
2009	Jamshedpur East	BJP	56,165	50.29	Won
2014	Jamshedpur East	BJP	103,427	61.46	Won
2019	Jamshedpur East	BJP	58,112	33.47	Lost

Preceded by Hemant Soren	Chief Minister of Jharkhand; 28 December 2014 – 23 December 2019	Succeeded by Hemant Soren
Preceded by Ganeshi Lal	Governor of Odisha; 31 October 2023 – December 2024	Succeeded by Hari Babu Kambhampati
