= Dashrath Gagrai =

Indian politician

- Citizenship: India
- Occupation: Politician
- Years active: 2014-present
- Political party: Jharkhand Mukti Morcha

Dashrath Gagrai is an Indian politician from the state of Jharkhand who is a member of the Jharkhand Legislative Assembly. He represents the Kharsawan assembly constituency of Seraikela Kharsawan district.

== Political career ==
In the 2014 Jharkhand Legislative Assembly election, Dashrath contested from Kharsawan Assembly constituency as a Jharkhand Mukti Morcha candidate. In this election, he got a total of 72,002 votes and was elected to the 4th Jharkhand Legislative Assembly. He defeated his nearest rival Arjun Munda of the Bharatiya Janata Party by 11,966 votes. He served in this assembly from 2014 to 2019.

In the 2019 Jharkhand Legislative Assembly election, Dashrath contested from Kharsawan Assembly constituency as a Jharkhand Mukti Morcha candidate. In this election, he got a total of 73,341 votes and was elected to the 5th Jharkhand Legislative Assembly. He defeated his nearest rival Jawahar Lal Banra of the Bharatiya Janata Party by 22,795 votes. He has been serving in this assembly since 2019.

== Electoral statistics ==
Year	Constituency	Votes	%	Result	Ref
2014	Kharsawan	72,002	49.15	Won	
2019	Kharsawan	73,341	48.15	Won	
