= Niral Purty =

Indian politician

Member of the Jharkhand Legislative Assembly

Niral Purty is an Indian politician and an MLA elected from Majhgaon block of Jharkhand state as a member of Jharkhand Mukti Morcha 2019.

== Electoral performance ==
2019 Jharkhand Legislative Assembly election: Majhgaon
Party	Candidate	Votes	%	±%
JMM	Niral Purty	67,750	51.58%	▲16.31
BJP	Bhupendra Pingua	20,558	15.65%	▼6.92
Bhartiya Azad Sena	Barkuwar Gagrai	13,502	10.28%	New
AJSU	Nandlal Birua	7,653	5.83%	New
Independent	Madhav Chandra Kunkal	5,170	3.94%	New
JVM(P)	Joseph Purty	2,660	2.03%	▼2.48
Independent	Ashok Birua	2,259	1.72%	New
NOTA	None of the Above	669	0.51%	▼2.15
Margin of victory		47,192	35.93%	▲27.22
Turnout		1,31,352	68.08%	▼5.12
Registered electors		1,92,939		▲10.04
JMM hold		Swing	▲16.31	

2014 Jharkhand Legislative Assembly election: Majhgaon
Party	Candidate	Votes	%	±%
JMM	Niral Purty	45,272	35.27%	▲9.89
JBSP	Madhu Kora	34,090	26.56%	▲17.79
BJP	Barkuwar Gagrai	28,969	22.57%	▼13.01
JVM(P)	Sukhdeo Biruli	5,777	4.50%	New
INC	Devendra Nath Champia	4,652	3.62%	▼6.08
JPP	Subhash Chandra Pingua	2,383	1.86%	New
BSP	Vinay Kumar Pingua	2,073	1.62%	New
NOTA	None of the Above	3,408	2.66%	New
Margin of victory		11,182	8.71%	▼1.48
Turnout		1,28,346	73.20%	▲5.65
Registered electors		1,75,337		▲22.02
JMM gain from BJP		Swing	▼0.30	

2009 Jharkhand Legislative Assembly election: Majhgaon
Party	Candidate	Votes	%	±%
BJP	Barkuwar Gagrai	34,534	35.58%	▼3.17
JMM	Niral Purty	24,644	25.39%	▼19.35
INC	Anil Kumar Buriuly	9,416	9.70%	New
JBSP	Roshan Pat Pingua	8,513	8.77%	New
Independent	Sukhdeo Biruli	4,145	4.27%	New
UGDP	Chandra Mohan Birua	3,552	3.66%	New
Independent	Lankeshwar Tamsoy	2,752	2.84%	New
Margin of victory		9,890	10.19%	▲4.20
Turnout		97,069	67.55%	▲4.92
Registered electors		1,43,692		▲3.70
BJP gain from JMM		Swing	▼9.16	

2005 Jharkhand Legislative Assembly election: Majhgaon
Party	Candidate	Votes	%	±%
JMM	Niral Purty	38,827	44.74%	▲21.80
BJP	Barkuwar Gagrai	33,626	38.74%	▲5.50
RJD	Goberdhan Nayak	4,006	4.62%	▼3.49
BSP	Manoher Sinku	2,666	3.07%	▲0.67
AJSU	Jaipal Singh Bodra	2,567	2.96%	New
Independent	Harish Chandra Alda	2,126	2.45%	New
Jharkhand Party	Gopal Sirka	1,594	1.84%	New
Margin of victory		5,201	5.99%	▼4.31
Turnout		86,788	62.63%	▲2.79
Registered electors		1,38,565		▲9.53
JMM gain from BJP		Swing	▲11.50	

2000 Bihar Legislative Assembly election: Majhgaon
Party	Candidate	Votes	%	±%
BJP	Badkunwar Gagrai	25,163	33.24%	New
JMM	Niral Purty	17,364	22.94%	New
INC	Devendra Nath Champia	14,537	19.20%	New
RJD	Gobardhan Nayak	6,133	8.10%	New
Independent	Chitrsen Sinku	3,487	4.61%	New
Independent	Amar Kalundia	2,444	3.23%	New
BSP	Radha Kishan Birua	1,820	2.40%	New
Margin of victory		7,799	10.30%	
Turnout		75,699	61.95%	
Registered electors		1,26,505		
BJP win (new seat)				
