= Lambodar Mahto =

Indian politician

Member of the Jharkhand Legislative Assembly for Gomia

Personal details
- Citizenship: Indian

Lambodar Mahto is an Indian politician and former bureaucrat from Jharkhand. He is a general secretary of All Jharkhand Students Union (AJSU) Party. He was a member of Jharkhand Legislative Assembly from Gomia Constituency. He had also served in Jharkhand Administrative Service.

== Education ==
Ph.D from RU in 2012, MBA from Sikkim Manipal University in 2013.
