= Kushwaha Shashi Bhushan Mehta =

Indian politician

Member of Jharkhand Legislative Assembly
- Incumbent
- Assumed office 2019
- Preceded by: Devendra Kumar Singh
- Constituency: Panki

Personal details
- Party: Bharatiya Janata Party
- Occupation: Politician

Kushwaha Shashi Bhushan Mehta, also known as S.B.P. Mehta, is an Indian politician and an MLA elected from Panki Assembly constituency of Jharkhand state as a member of Bharatiya Janata Party in 2019 and 2024.

In 2024, he was made the candidate of Bharatiya Janata Party once again from the Panki Assembly constituency, which he retained successfully after defeating independent candidate Devendra Kumar Singh, the runner-up. He defeated Singh with a margin of 9,796 votes. The Indian National Congress candidate Lal Suraj was the second runner-up.

Mehta was associated with the Jharkhand Mukti Morcha political party before joining BJP. He owns the Oxford Group of Institutions— a chain of schools spread across Ranchi and Palamu, which includes Oxford Public School of Ranchi. He was the main accused in the murder of Suchitra Mishra, the warden of Oxford Public School in Ranchi, of which he was director at the time. However, he was acquitted later in this case.
