= Vikash Kumar Munda =

Indian politician

Member of the Jharkhand Legislative Assembly

Vikash Kumar Munda is an Indian politician. Munda is a member of the Jharkhand Legislative Assembly from the Tamar constituency in Ranchi district. He is the son of former minister Ramesh Singh Munda.
