= Mangal Kalindi =

Indian politician

Member of the Jharkhand Legislative Assembly

Mangal Kalindi is an Indian politician and member of the Jharkhand Mukti Morcha. Kalindi is a member of the Jharkhand Legislative Assembly from the Jugsalai constituency in East Singhbhum district.
