= Banna Gupta =

Indian politician

Minister of Health, Government of Jharkhand
- In office 28 January 2020 – 28 November 2024
- Preceded by: Ramchandra Chandravanshi

Member of the Jharkhand Legislative Assembly
- In office 2019 – 2024

Personal details
- Party: Indian National Congress

Banna Gupta is an Indian politician from Jharkhand, India and was a Member of Jharkhand Legislative Assembly. He was the Health Minister of Jharkhand. He was also a minister in Hemant Soren cabinet.
