= Munda ministry =

Munda ministry may refer to these cabinets headed by Indian politician Arjun Munda as chief minister of Jharkhand:

- First Munda ministry (2003–2005)
- Second Munda ministry (2005–2006)
- Third Munda ministry (2010–2013)
