= Second Munda ministry =

- Ministry of Jharkhand
- 2005–2006
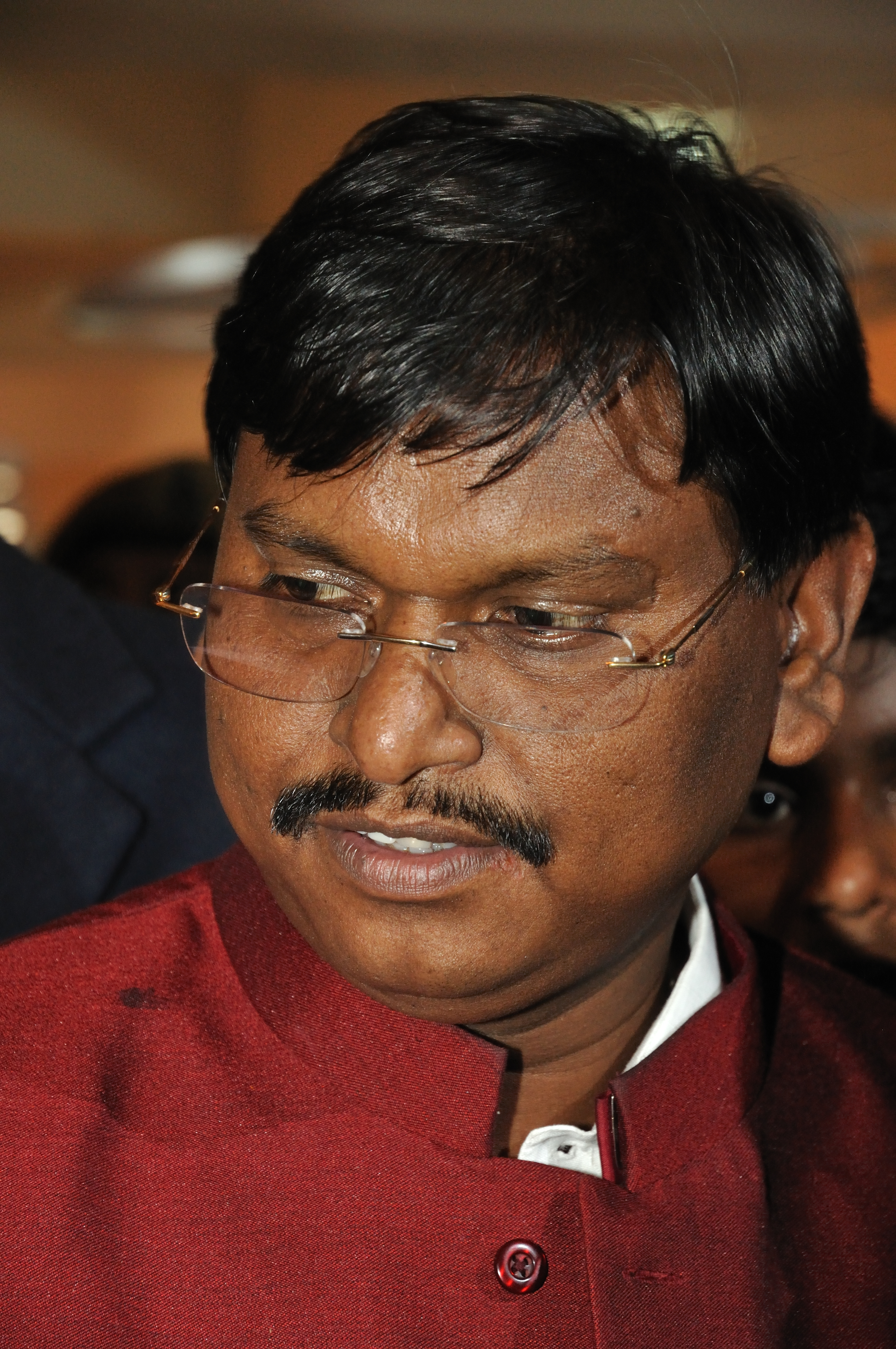
- Arjun Munda, Hon'ble Chief Minister of Jharkhand
- Date formed: 12 March 2005
- Date dissolved: 14 September 2006

People and organisations
- Head of state: Hon'ble Governor of Jharkhand Syed Sibtey Razi
- Head of government: Arjun Munda
- No. of ministers: 11
- Total no. of members: 11
- Member parties: Bharatiya Janata Party; All Jharkhand Students Union
- Status in legislature: Coalition
- Opposition party: Indian National Congress; Jharkhand Mukti Morcha

History
- Election: 2009
- Outgoing election: 2005
- Legislature term: 5 years
- Predecessor: First Shibu Soren ministry
- Successor: Madhu Koda ministry

This is a list of minister from Arjun Munda cabinets starting from 12 March 2005 – 8 September 2006. Arjun Munda is the leader of Bharatiya Janata Party was sworn in the Chief Ministers of Jharkhand in 12 March 2005. Here is the list of the ministers of his ministry.

Arjun Munda along with five Independent MLAs, took oath of office on 12 March and on 29 March, two ministers from Bharatiya Janata Party, two minister from Janata Dal (United) and one from minister from Nationalist Congress Party who switched over to the Bharatiya Janata Party before swearing in.

== Ministers ==
SI No.	Name	Constituency	Department	Party
1.	Arjun Munda; Chief Minister	Kharsawan		BJP
2.	Sudesh Mahto	Silli		AJSU
3.	Chandra Prakash Choudhary	Ramgarh		AJSU
4.	Enos Ekka	Kolebira		IND
5.	Madhu Koda	Jaganathpur		IND
6.	Harinarain Rai	Jarmundi		IND
7.	Raghubar Das	Jamshedpur East		BJP
8.	Pradeep Yadav	Poreyahat		BJP
9.	Radha Krishna Kishore	Chhatarpur		JDU
10.	Ramesh Singh Munda	Tamar		JDU
11.	Kamlesh Kumar Singh	Hussainabad		NCP

== Ministers by Party ==
Representation of cabinet ministers by party
1. Bharatiya Janata Party (27.0%)
2. Independent politician (27.0%)
3. All Jharkhand Students Union (18.0%)
4. Janata Dal (United) (18.0%)
5. Nationalist Congress Party (10.0%)

Party	Cabinet Ministers	Total Ministers
Bharatiya Janata Party	3	3
All Jharkhand Students Union	2	2
Janata Dal (United)	2	2
Nationalist Congress Party	1	1
Independent politician	3	3

== See also ==
- Government of Jharkhand
- Jharkhand Legislative Assembly
- Arjun Munda first ministry
- Arjun Munda third ministry
