= Third Munda ministry =

- Ministry of Jharkhand
- 2010 - 2013
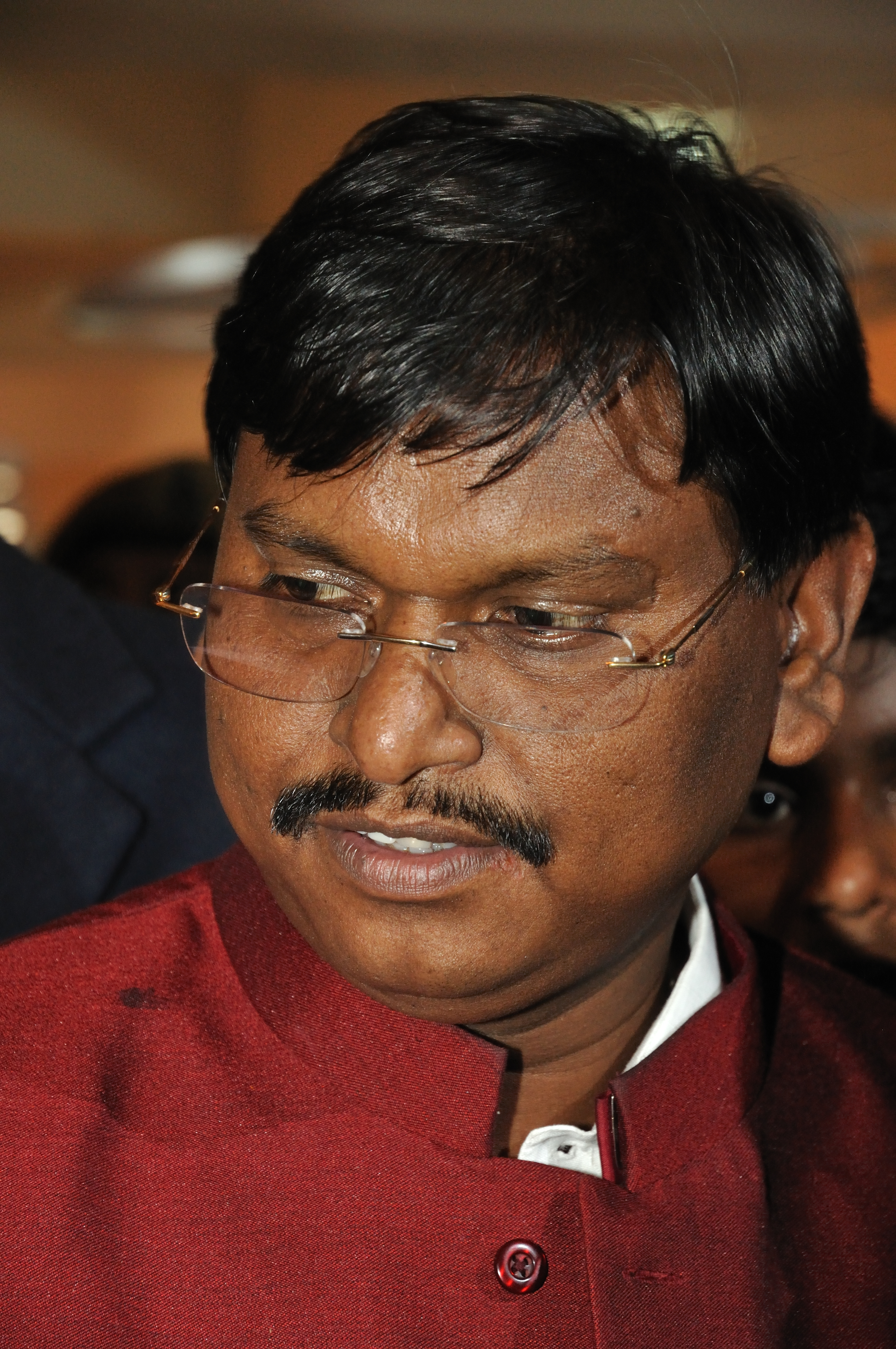
- Arjun Munda, Hon'ble Chief Minister of Jharkhand
- Date formed: 11 September 2010
- Date dissolved: 18 January 2013

People and organisations
- Head of state: Hon'ble Governor of Jharkhand M. O. H. Farook
- Head of government: Arjun Munda
- No. of ministers: 11
- Total no. of members: 11
- Member parties: Bharatiya Janata Party; All Jharkhand Students Union; Jharkhand Mukti Morcha; Janata Dal (United)
- Status in legislature: Coalition
- Opposition party: Indian National Congress

History
- Election: 2014
- Outgoing election: 2009
- Legislature term: 5 years
- Predecessor: President's rule
- Successor: President's rule

This is a list of ministers from Arjun Munda cabinets from 11 September 2010 to 18 January 2013. Arjun Munda is the leader of Bharatiya Janata Party was sworn in the Chief Ministers of Jharkhand on 11 September 2010. Here is the list of the ministers of his ministry.

Arjun Munda along with two ministers, took an oath of office on 11 September, one minister from Jharkhand Mukti Morcha and one from minister from All Jharkhand Students Union.

On 8 October 2010 the cabinet was expanded with introduction of three ministers from the Bharatiya Janata Party, four ministers from Jharkhand Mukti Morcha and one minister each from All Jharkhand Students Union and Janata Dal (United).

== Ministers ==
| SI No. | Name | Constituency | Department | Party |
|---|---|---|---|---|
| 1. | Arjun Munda; Chief Minister | Kharsawan | Minister of Home, Road and Public Relations and Departments or subjects not specifically allotted to any other Minister | BJP |
| 2. | Sudesh Mahto | Silli | Deputy Chief Minister, Minister of Panchayati Raj and Rural Development | AJSU |
| 3. | Hemant Soren | Dumka | Deputy Chief Minister, Minister of Mining, Sports and Finance | JMM |
| 4. | Baidyanath Ram | Latehar | Minister of Human Resource Development department | BJP |
| 5. | Satyanand Jha | Nala | Agriculture; Industry; Animal Husbandry | BJP |
| 6. | Hussain Ansari | Madhupur | Welfare; Cooperative | JMM |
| 7. | Mathura Prasad Mahato | Tundi | Land Reform; Food | JMM |
| 8. | Hemlal Murmu | Barhait | Health and Family Welfare | JMM |
| 9. | Champai Soren | Seraikella | Science and Technology; Labour; Housing | JMM |
| 10. | Gopal Krishna Patar | Tamar | Emergency department | JDU |
| 11. | Chandra Prakash Chaudhary | Ramgarh | Emergency department | AJSU |
| 12. | Vimla Pradhan | Simdega | Social Welfare; Women and Child Development; Tourism | BJP |
| 13. | Shyam Nandan Sahay | Hatia | Water Resource | BJP |

== Ministers by Party ==
Representation of cabinet ministers by party
1. Bharatiya Janata Party (39.0%)
2. Jharkhand Mukti Morcha (39.0%)
3. All Jharkhand Students Union (15.0%)
4. Janata Dal (United) (7.00%)

| Party | Cabinet Ministers | Total Ministers |
|---|---|---|
| Bharatiya Janata Party | 5 | 5 |
| Jharkhand Mukti Morcha | 5 | 5 |
| All Jharkhand Students Union | 2 | 2 |
| Janata Dal (United) | 1 | 1 |

== See also ==
- Government of Jharkhand
- Jharkhand Legislative Assembly
- Arjun Munda second ministry
- Arjun Munda first ministry
