= Marandi ministry =

Ministers in Government of Jharkhand headed by Chief Minister Babulal Marandi

- Ministry of the State of Jharkhand
- Date formed: 15 November 2000
- Date dissolved: 13 March 2003

People and organisations
- Head of state: Prabhat Kumar
- Head of government: Babulal Marandi
- Total no. of members: 26
- Member parties: BJP; Samata Party; JD(U); UGDP; Independent
- Status in legislature: Majority 45 / 81 (56%)
- Opposition party: JMM
- Opposition leader: Stephen Marandi , JMM

History
- Outgoing election: 2000
- Legislature term: 5 years (Unless sooner dissolved)
- Successor: First Munda ministry

This is a list of minister from Babulal Marandi cabinets starting from 15 November 2000 – 18 March 2003. Babulal Marandi is the leader of Bharatiya Janata Party was sworn in the Chief Ministers of Jharkhand on 15 November 2000. This is the first Council of Ministers in Jharkhand.

== Ministers ==
SI No.	Name	Constituency	Department	Party
1.	Babulal Marandi; Chief Minister	Ramgarh	Jharkhand Cabinet Secretariat and Coordination, Information and Public Relations, Home Affairs, Personnel and Administrative Reforms and Official Language, Civil Aviation, Planning Development, Institutional Finance and Program Implementation, Registration, Information Technology, Cooperation, Assistance and Rehabilitation, Medical, Education and all those departments, which is not allotted to anyone	BJP
2.	Lalchand Mahto	Dumri	Department of Energy	JDU
3.	Samresh Singh	Bokaro	Department of Science and Technology	Independent
4.	Yamuna Singh	Manika	Department of Forest and Environment	BJP
5.	Deo Dayal	Hazaribagh	Department of Agriculture	BJP
6.	Mrigendra Pratap Singh	Jamshedpur West	Department of Commercial Taxes and National Savings	BJP
7.	Ramji Lal Sarda	Hatia	Department of Law	BJP
8.	Devidhan Besra	Maheshpur	Department of Food Supply, Commerce, Fisheries and Animal Husbandry	BJP
9.	Raghubar Das	Jamshedpur East	Department of Labour, Employment and Training	BJP
10.	Arjun Munda	Kharsawan	Department of Welfare (including Minority Welfare)	BJP
11.	Pashupati Nath Singh	Dhanbad	Department of Industry	BJP
12.	Sadhanu Bhagat	Lohardaga	Department of Building Construction and Transport	BJP
13.	Joba Majhi	Manoharpur	Department of Tourism, Women and Child Welfare and Housing	UGDP
14.	Madhu Singh	Panki	Department of Revenue and Land Reforms	SP
15.	Ramchandra Keshri	Bhawanathpur	Department of Water Resources and Parliamentary Affairs	SP
16.	Chandra Mohan Prasad	Giridih	Department of Human Resources	BJP
17.	Pradeep Yadav	Poreyahat	Department of Rural Development	BJP
18.	Ravindra Kumar Ray	Dhanwar	Department of Mines and Geology	BJP
19.	Baidyanath Ram	Latehar	Department of Sports, Arts, Culture and Youth Affairs	BJP
20.	Ramesh Singh Munda	Tamar	Department of Excise and Prohibition	SP
21.	Bacha Singh	Jharia	Department of Urban Development	SP
22.	Sudarshan Bhagat	Gumla	Department of Human Resources (Minister of State)	BJP
23.	Jaleshwar Mahato	Baghmara	Department of Public Health and Engineering	SP
24.	Nilkanth Singh Munda	Khunti	Department of Road Construction (Minister of State)	BJP
25.	Madhu Koda	Jagannathpur	Department of Rural Engineering Organization	BJP
26.	Dinesh Sarangi	Baharagora	Department of Health and Family Welfare	BJP

== Ministers by Party ==
Representation of cabinet ministers by party
1. Bharatiya Janata Party (69.0%)
2. Samata Party (19.0%)
3. United Goans Democratic Party (4.00%)
4. Janata Dal (United) (4.00%)
5. Independent politician (4.00%)

Party	Cabinet Ministers	Total Ministers
Bharatiya Janata Party	18	18
Samata Party	5	5
United Goans Democratic Party	1	1
Janata Dal (United)	1	1
Independent politician	1	1
