= First Munda ministry =

- Ministry of Jharkhand
- 2003–2005
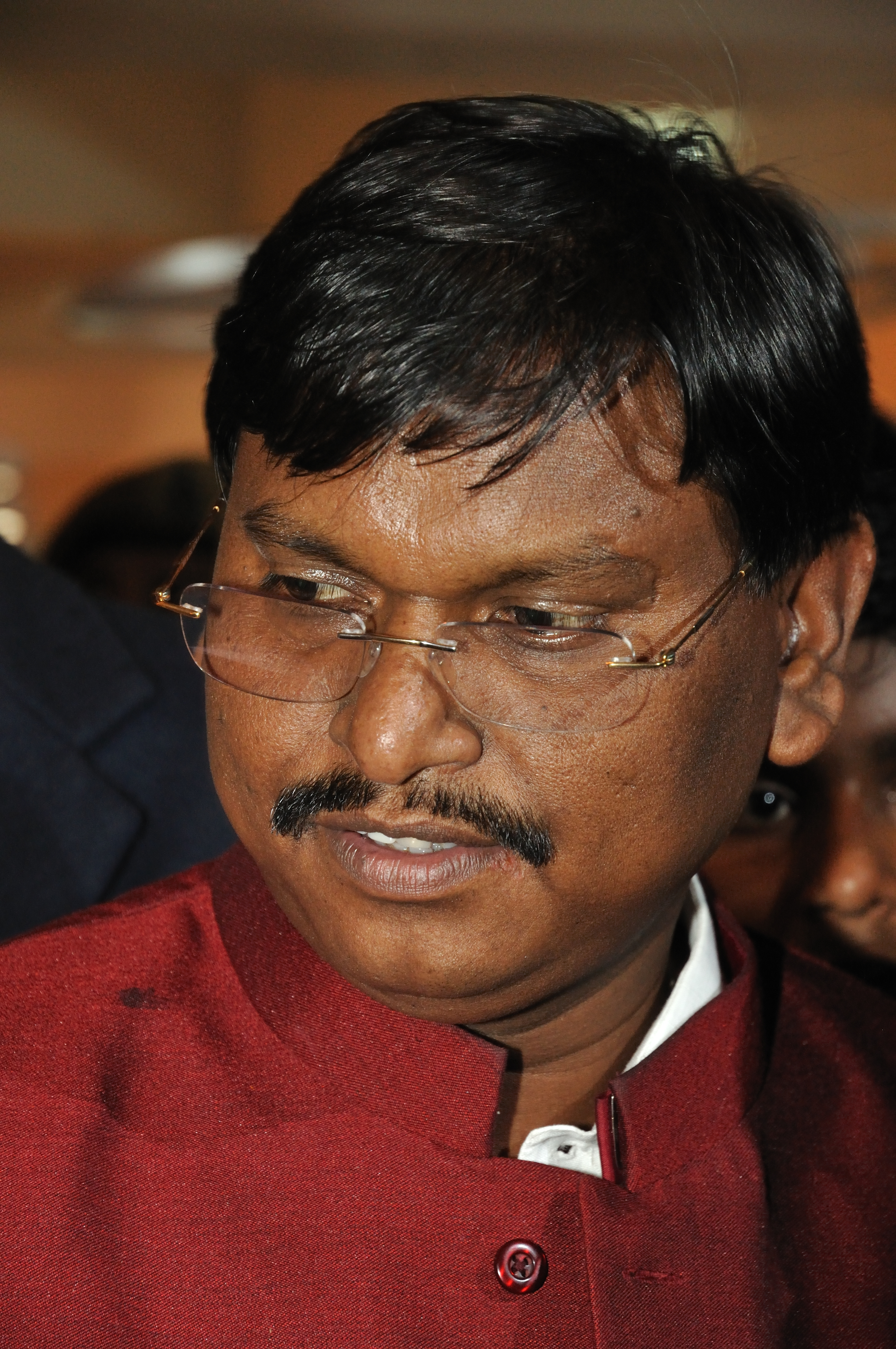
- Arjun Munda, Hon'ble Chief Minister of Jharkhand
- Date formed: 18 March 2003
- Date dissolved: 2 March 2005

People and organisations
- Head of state: Hon'ble Governor of Jharkhand M. Rama Jois
- Head of government: Arjun Munda
- No. of ministers: 26
- Total no. of members: 26
- Member parties: Bharatiya Janata Party; All Jharkhand Students Union
- Status in legislature: Majority 40 / 79 (51%)
- Opposition party: Indian National Congress; Jharkhand Mukti Morcha

History
- Election: 2009
- Outgoing election: 2005
- Legislature term: 5 years
- Predecessor: Babulal Marandi ministry
- Successor: First Shibu Soren ministry

This is a list of ministers from Arjun Munda's cabinets, which lasted from 18 March 2003 – 2 March 2005. Arjun Munda, leader of Bharatiya Janata Party, was sworn in as the Chief Minister of Jharkhand on 18 March 2003. Below is the list of ministers who served in his ministry.

On 18 March, Arjun Munda, along with five ministers, took the oath of office. The cabinet included one minister from Bharatiya Janata Party, one minister from Jharkhand Vananchal Congress and two from the All Jharkhand Students Union, and one Independent.

== Ministers ==
SI No.	Name	Constituency	Department	Party
1.	Arjun Munda; Chief Minister	Kharsawan	Cabinet Secretariat; Cabinet Coordination; Home; Public Relations; Personnel; Raj Bhasha; Administrative Reforms; Institutional Finance; Programme Implementation; Relief & Rehabilitation; Mines & Geology; Law; Fisheries; Animal Husbandry; unallocated departments	BJP
2.	Mrigendra Pratap Singh	Jamshedpur West	Finance; Parliamentary Affairs	BJP
3.	Pashupati Nath Singh	Dhanbad	Human Resources Development	BJP
4.	Yamuna Singh	Manika	Forest; Environment	BJP
5.	Raghubar Das	Jamshedpur East	Building Construction	BJP
6.	Dev Dyal Kushwaha	Hazaribagh	Food, Civil Supplies & Cooperatives	BJP
7.	Ramji Lal Sarda	Hatia	Commercial Taxes & National Savings	BJP
8.	Devidhan Basra	Maheshpur	Agriculture	BJP
9.	Chandra Mohan Prasad	Giridih	Rural Development	BJP
10.	Sudesh Mahto	Silli	Road Construction	UGDP
11.	Joba Majhi	Manoharpur	Tourism; Social Welfare; Housing	UGDP
12.	Lalchand Mahto	Dumri	Energy	JD(U)
13.	Baidyanath Ram	Latehar	Excise; Prohibition	JD(U)
14.	Samresh Singh	Bokaro	Science & Technology; Information Technology	IND
15.	Madhavlal Singh	Gomia	Transport	IND

== Ministers by Party ==
Representation of cabinet ministers by party
1. Bharatiya Janata Party (57.7%)
2. Samata Party (19.2%)
3. United Goans Democratic Party (7.70%)
4. Janata Dal (United) (7.70%)
5. Independent politician (7.70%)

Party	Cabinet Ministers	Minister of state	Total Ministers
Bharatiya Janata Party	13	2	15
Samata Party	5	–	5
United Goans Democratic Party	2	–	2
Janata Dal (United)	2	–	2
Independent politician	2	–	2

== See also ==
- Government of Jharkhand
- Jharkhand Legislative Assembly
- Second Arjun Munda ministry
- Arjun Munda third ministry
