= Suresh Kumar Baitha =

Indian politician

Member of the Jharkhand Legislative Assembly
- Incumbent
- Assumed office 23 November 2024
- Preceded by: Sammari Lal
- Constituency: Kanke

Personal details
- Political party: Indian National Congress
- Profession: Politician

Suresh Kumar Baitha is an Indian politician from Jharkhand. He is a member of the Jharkhand Legislative Assembly from 2024, representing Kanke Assembly constituency as a member of the Indian National Congress.

== See also ==
- List of chief ministers of Jharkhand
- Maharashtra Legislative Assembly
