= Kanke Assembly constituency =

Constituency of the Jharkhand legislative assembly in India

Coordinates: 23.437°N 85.322°E

Kanke
- Constituency No. 65 for the Jharkhand Legislative Assembly

Constituency details
- Country: India
- Region: East India
- State: Jharkhand
- District: Ranchi
- Lok Sabha constituency: Ranchi
- Established: 2000
- Total electors: 415,081
- Reservation: SC

Member of Legislative Assembly
- 5th Jharkhand Legislative Assembly
- Incumbent Suresh Kumar Baitha
- Party: INC
- Alliance: MGB
- Elected year: 2024

Kanke Assembly constituency is an assembly constituency in the Indian state of Jharkhand.

Most successful parties after separate Jharkhand state.
1. BJP (80.0%)
2. INC (20.0%)

== Members of the Legislative Assembly ==
Election	Member	Party
Bihar Legislative Assembly
Before 1967: Constituency did not exist
1967	J. N. Choubey	Jan Kranti Dal
1969	Ram Tahal Chaudhary	Bharatiya Jana Sangh
1972	Ram Tahal Chaudhary	Bharatiya Jana Sangh
1977	Hira Ram Toofani	Janata Party
1980	Ram Ratan Ram	Indian National Congress
1985	Hari Ram	Indian National Congress
1990	Ram Chandra Baitha	Bharatiya Janata Party
1995	Ram Chandra Baitha	Bharatiya Janata Party
2000	Ram Chandra Nayak	Bharatiya Janata Party
Jharkhand Legislative Assembly
2005	Ram Chandra Baitha	Bharatiya Janata Party
2009	Ram Chandra Baitha	Bharatiya Janata Party
2014	Dr. Jitu Charan Ram	Bharatiya Janata Party
2019	Sammari Lal	Bharatiya Janata Party
2024	Suresh Kumar Baitha	Indian National Congress

== Election results ==
=== Assembly election 2024 ===
2024 Jharkhand Legislative Assembly election: Kanke
Party	Candidate	Votes	%	±%
INC	Suresh Kumar Baitha	133,499	43.47%	▲8.30
BJP	Dr. Jitu Charan Ram	1,32,531	43.16%	▼0.88
JLKM	Phuleshwar Baitha	25,965	8.46%	New
CPI	Santosh Kumar Rajak	3,157	1.03%	New
NOTA	None of the Above	3,588	1.17%	▼0.13
Margin of victory		968	0.32%	▼8.55
Turnout		3,07,093	63.74%	▲2.48
Registered electors		4,81,815		▲16.08
INC gain from BJP		Swing	▼0.57	

=== Assembly election 2019 ===
2019 Jharkhand Legislative Assembly election: Kanke
Party	Candidate	Votes	%	±%
BJP	Sammari Lal	111,975	44.04%	▼11.65
INC	Suresh Kumar Baitha	89,435	35.17%	▲8.27
AJSU	Ramjeet Ganjhu	29,127	11.46%	New
JVM(P)	Kamlesh Ram	10,391	4.09%	New
JD(U)	Ashok Kumar Nag	1,678	0.66%	New
LJP	Shankar Prasad	1,549	0.61%	New
Rashtriya Jaihind Party	Santosh Kumar	1,442	0.57%	New
NOTA	None of the Above	3,313	1.30%	▼0.07
Margin of victory		22,540	8.86%	▼19.92
Turnout		2,54,259	61.26%	▲1.45
Registered electors		4,15,081		▲19.48
BJP hold		Swing	▼11.65	

=== Assembly election 2014 ===
2014 Jharkhand Legislative Assembly election: Kanke
Party	Candidate	Votes	%	±%
BJP	Dr. Jitu Charan Ram	115,702	55.69%	▲24.39
INC	Suresh Kumar Baitha	55,898	26.90%	▼1.23
JMM	Ashok Kumar Nag	17,411	8.38%	▼2.85
CPI	Subedar Ram	4,735	2.28%	New
AITC	Niranjan Kalindi	1,968	0.95%	New
Independent	Rajesh Rajak	1,630	0.78%	New
Independent	Vijay Ram	1,303	0.63%	New
NOTA	None of the Above	2,851	1.37%	New
Margin of victory		59,804	28.78%	▲25.62
Turnout		2,07,762	59.81%	▲16.21
Registered electors		3,47,392		▲4.77
BJP hold		Swing	▲24.39	

=== Assembly election 2009 ===
2009 Jharkhand Legislative Assembly election: Kanke
Party	Candidate	Votes	%	±%
BJP	Ramchandra Baitha	45,245	31.30%	▼17.29
INC	Suresh Kumar Baitha	40,674	28.14%	New
JMM	Sammari Lal	16,228	11.23%	▼25.47
Independent	Ramjeet Ganjhu	9,335	6.46%	New
AJSU	Shanti Devi	9,091	6.29%	New
Independent	Arjun Kumar Ram	4,559	3.15%	New
Akhil Bharatiya Manav Seva Dal	Ajay Rajak	3,596	2.49%	New
Margin of victory		4,571	3.16%	▼8.74
Turnout		1,44,559	43.60%	▼16.67
Registered electors		3,31,582		▲57.89
BJP hold		Swing	▼17.29	

=== Assembly election 2005 ===
2005 Jharkhand Legislative Assembly election: Kanke
Party	Candidate	Votes	%	±%
BJP	Ramchandra Baitha	61,502	48.59%	▲2.41
JMM	Sammari Lal	46,443	36.69%	▲31.88
Independent	Ramjeet Ganjhu	12,521	9.89%	New
RJD	Ghuran Ram	8,906	7.04%	▼20.02
Independent	Balram Pradhan	3,985	3.15%	New
Independent	Bibhash Chandra Ranjan	3,392	2.68%	New
BSP	Rijhu Nayak	2,230	2.09%	New
Margin of victory		15,059	11.90%	▼7.23
Turnout		1,26,575	60.27%	▲18.22
Registered electors		2,10,012		▼2.90
BJP hold		Swing	▲2.41	

=== Assembly election 2000 ===
2000 Bihar Legislative Assembly election: Kanke
Party	Candidate	Votes	%	±%
BJP	Ram Chandra Nayak	41,994	46.18%	New
RJD	Sammari Lal	24,603	27.05%	New
INC	Vikram Jai Kishore	11,679	12.84%	New
JMM	Vindhyachal Ram	4,372	4.81%	New
NCP	Hari Ram	4,187	4.60%	New
CPI	Chuni Lal Nayak	2,314	2.54%	New
SP	Sarjeev Mirdha	649	0.71%	New
Margin of victory		17,391	19.12%	
Turnout		90,937	42.52%	
Registered electors		2,16,280		
BJP win (new seat)				

== See also ==
- Vidhan Sabha
- List of states of India by type of legislature
