= Ram Surya Munda =

Indian politician

Member of the Jharkhand Legislative Assembly
- Incumbent
- Assumed office 23 November 2024
- Preceded by: Nilkanth Singh Munda
- Constituency: Khunti

Personal details
- Political party: Jharkhand Mukti Morcha
- Profession: Politician

Ram Surya Munda is an Indian politician from Jharkhand. He is a member of the Jharkhand Legislative Assembly from 2024, representing Khunti Assembly constituency as a member of the Jharkhand Mukti Morcha.

== See also ==
- List of chief ministers of Jharkhand
- Jharkhand Legislative Assembly
