= Nilkanth Singh Munda =

Indian politician

Minister of Rural Development & Panchayat Raj Government of Jharkhand
- In office 28 December 2014 – 29 December 2019
- Chief Minister: Raghubar Das
- Succeeded by: Alamgir Alam

Member of Jharkhand Legislative Assembly
- In office 2000–2024
- Preceded by: Sushila Kerketta
- Succeeded by: Ram Surya Munda
- Constituency: Khunti

Nilkanth Singh Munda (born 1968) is an Indian political leader and a 5th term MLA from Khunti constituency. He was a Minister of Parliamentary Affairs and Rural Development in the Government of Jharkhand. He is one of the chief Bharatiya Janata Party leaders in the state.

== Personal life ==
He has five siblings. He is married to Sarita Devi and has two daughters and a son.

== Early life and education ==
He was born in the village of Mahil which is in the district of Khunti on 5 January 1968 to T. Muchirai Munda and Radhika Munda. His father was also a political leader. He passed his matriculation exam in 1984. He completed his graduation in B.A. from Magadha University in 1988.

== Political Journey ==
Munda fought 2000 legislative election from Khunti on BJP’s ticket and became an MLA. He also won the Vidhan Sabha Elections in 2005, 2009, and 2014. He was given the charge of the Land Revenue by the previous Jharkhand Government and was working as the Minister of Parliamentary Affairs and Rural Development.
