= Jharkhand Legislative Assembly =

Unicameral legislature of the Indian state of Jharkhand

- 6th Jharkhand Assembly

Type
- Type: Unicameral
- Term limits: 5 years

History
- Founded: 22 November 2000 (25 years ago)
- Preceded by: Bihar Legislative Assembly

Leadership
- Speaker: Rabindra Nath Mahato, JMM since 6 January 2020
- Leader of the House (Chief Minister): Hemant Soren, JMM since 28 November 2024
- Leader of the Opposition: Babulal Marandi, BJP since 6 March 2025

Structure
- Seats: 81
- Political groups: Government (55) MGB (55): JMM (33); INC (16); RJD (4); CPI(ML)L (2); Opposition (25) NDA (24): BJP (21); AJSU (1); JD(U) (1); LJP(RV) (1); Others (1): JLKM (1); Vacant (1): Vacant (1)

Elections
- Voting system: First past the post
- Last election: 13 - 20 November 2024
- Next election: 2029

Meeting place
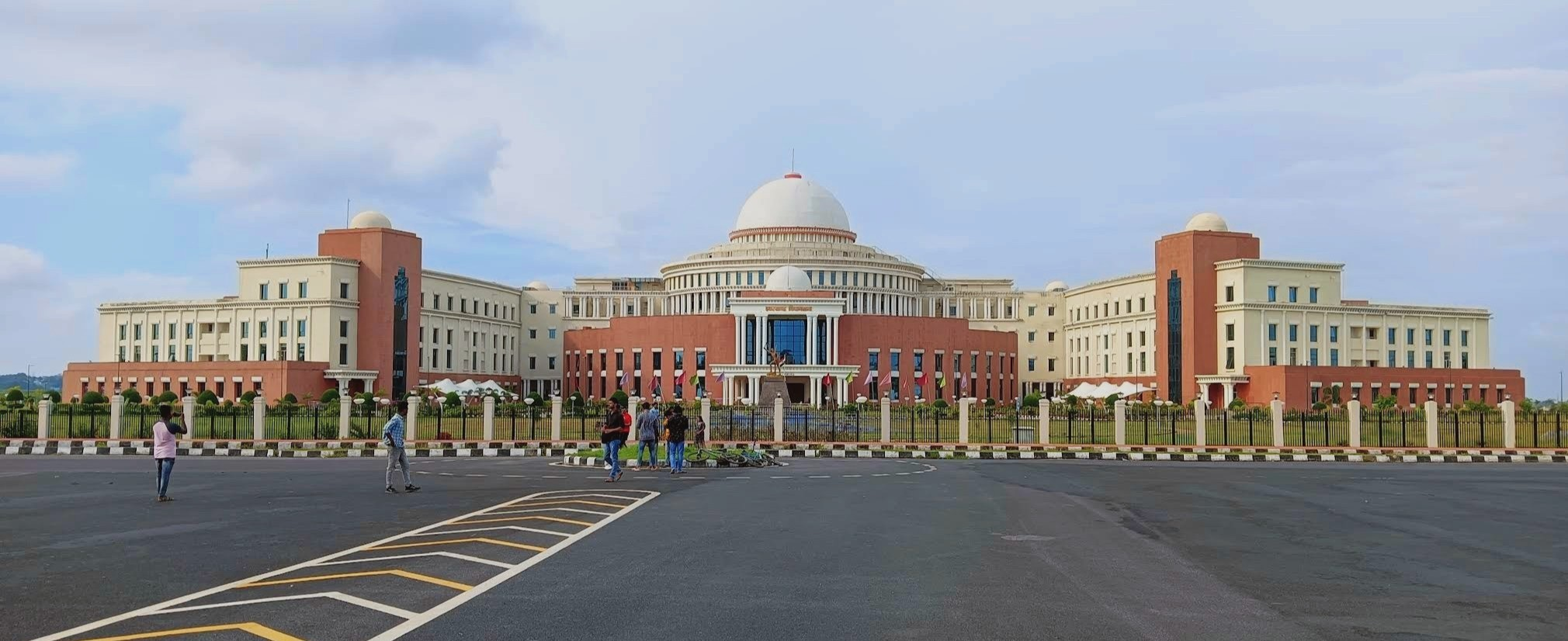
- Vidhan Sabha Bhavan, Ranchi, Jharkhand, India

Website
- jhla.neva.gov.in

The Jharkhand Legislative Assembly, commonly known as the Jharkhand Vidhan Sabha, is the unicameral state legislature of Jharkhand state in India. The seat of the Legislative Assembly is at Ranchi, the capital of the state.

== List of assemblies ==
Assembly (election)	Chief Minister	Term			Party (Note: This column only names the chief minister's party. The state government he headed may have been a complex coalition of several parties and independents; these are not listed here.)
1st (Note: The first Legislative Assembly of Jharkhand was constituted by the MLAs elected in the 2000 Bihar Legislative Assembly election, whose constituencies were in the newly formed Jharkhand.) (2000 election)	Babulal Marandi	15 November 2000	18 March 2003	2 years, 123 days	Bharatiya Janata Party
1st (2000 election)	Arjun Munda	18 March 2003	2 March 2005	1 year, 349 days	Bharatiya Janata Party
2nd (2005 election)	Shibu Soren	2 March 2005	12 March 2005	10 days	Jharkhand Mukti Morcha
2nd (2005 election)	Arjun Munda	12 March 2005	18 September 2006	1 year, 190 days	Bharatiya Janata Party
2nd (2005 election)	Madhu Koda	18 September 2006	27 August 2008	1 year, 343 days	Independent
2nd (2005 election)	Shibu Soren	27 August 2008	19 January 2009	145 days	Jharkhand Mukti Morcha
	Vacant (Note: President's rule may be imposed when the "government in a state is not able to function as per the Constitution", which often happens because no party or coalition has a majority in the assembly. When President's rule is in force in a state, its council of ministers stands dissolved. The office of chief minister thus lies vacant, and the administration is taken over by the governor, who functions on behalf of the central government. At times, the legislative assembly also stands dissolved.) (President's rule)	19 January 2009	30 December 2009	345 days	N/A
3rd (2009 election)	Shibu Soren	30 December 2009	1 June 2010	153 days	Jharkhand Mukti Morcha
3rd (2009 election)	Vacant (President's rule)	1 June 2010	11 September 2010	102 days	N/A
3rd (2009 election)	Arjun Munda	11 September 2010	18 January 2013	2 years, 129 days	Bharatiya Janata Party
3rd (2009 election)	Vacant (President's rule)	18 January 2013	13 July 2013	176 days	N/A
3rd (2009 election)	Hemant Soren	13 July 2013	28 December 2014	1 year, 168 days	Jharkhand Mukti Morcha
4th (2014 election)	Raghubar Das	28 December 2014	29 December 2019	5 years, 1 day	Bharatiya Janata Party
5th (2019 election)	Hemant Soren	29 December 2019	2 February 2024	4 years, 35 days	Jharkhand Mukti Morcha
5th (2019 election)	Champai Soren	2 February 2024	4 July 2024	153 days	Jharkhand Mukti Morcha
5th (2019 election)	Hemant Soren	4 July 2024	28 November 2024	147 days	Jharkhand Mukti Morcha
6th (2024 election)	Hemant Soren	28 November 2024	Incumbent	1 year, 357 days	Jharkhand Mukti Morcha

== Composition ==
Alliance	Political party	No. of MLAs	Leader of the party
Government; MGB; Seats: 56	Jharkhand Mukti Morcha	34	Hemant Soren (Chief Minister)
Government; MGB; Seats: 56	Indian National Congress	16	Keshav Mahto Kamlesh
Government; MGB; Seats: 56	Rashtriya Janata Dal	4	Sanjay Prasad Yadav
Government; MGB; Seats: 56	Communist Party of India (Marxist–Leninist) Liberation	2	Arup Chatterjee
Opposition; NDA; Seats: 24	Bharatiya Janata Party	21	Babulal Marandi (Leader of the Opposition)
Opposition; NDA; Seats: 24	All Jharkhand Students Union	1	Sudesh Mahato
Opposition; NDA; Seats: 24	Janata Dal (United)	1	Saryu Roy
Opposition; NDA; Seats: 24	Lok Janshakti Party (Ram Vilas)	1	Janardan Paswan
Others; Seats: 1	Jharkhand Loktantrik Krantikari Morcha	1	Jairam Kumar Mahato
Total		81	

== Members of Legislative Assembly ==
District	No.	Constituency	Name	Party	Alliance	Remarks
Sahebganj	1	Rajmahal	Mohammad Tajuddin	JMM	MGB	
Sahebganj	2	Borio	Dhananjay Soren	JMM	MGB	
Sahebganj	3	Barhait	Hemant Soren	JMM	MGB	Chief Minister
Pakur	4	Litipara	Hemlal Murmu	JMM	MGB	
Pakur	5	Pakur	Nisat Alam	INC	MGB	
Pakur	6	Maheshpur	Stephen Marandi	JMM	MGB	
Dumka	7	Sikaripara	Alok Kumar Soren	JMM	MGB	
Jamtara	8	Nala	Rabindra Nath Mahato	JMM	MGB	Speaker
Jamtara	9	Jamtara	Irfan Ansari	INC	MGB	Cabinet minister
Dumka	10	Dumka	Basant Soren	JMM	MGB	
Dumka	11	Jama	Louis Marandi	JMM	MGB	
Dumka	12	Jarmundi	Devendra Kunwar	BJP	NDA	
Deoghar	13	Madhupur	Hafizul Hasan	JMM	MGB	Cabinet minister
Deoghar	14	Sarath	Uday Shankar Singh	JMM	MGB	
Deoghar	15	Deoghar	Suresh Paswan	RJD	MGB	
Godda	16	Poreyahat	Pradeep Yadav	INC	MGB	
Godda	17	Godda	Sanjay Prasad Yadav	RJD	MGB	Cabinet minister
Godda	18	Mahagama	Dipika Pandey Singh	INC	MGB	Cabinet minister
Koderma	19	Kodarma	Neera Yadav	BJP	NDA	
Hazaribagh	20	Barkatha	Amit Kumar Yadav	BJP	NDA	
Hazaribagh	21	Barhi	Manoj Kumar Yadav	BJP	NDA	
Ramgarh	22	Barkagaon	Roshan Lal Choudhary	BJP	NDA	
Ramgarh	23	Ramgarh	Mamta Devi	INC	MGB	
Hazaribagh	24	Mandu	Nirmal Mahto	AJSU	NDA	
Hazaribagh	25	Hazaribagh	Pradip Prasad	BJP	NDA	
Chatra	26	Simaria	Kumar Ujjwal	BJP	NDA	
Chatra	27	Chatra	Janardan Paswan	LJP(RV)	NDA	
Giridih	28	Dhanwar	Babulal Marandi	BJP	NDA	Leader of Opposition
Giridih	29	Bagodar	Nagendra Mahto	BJP	NDA	
Giridih	30	Jamua	Manju Kumari	BJP	NDA	
Giridih	31	Gandey	Kalpana Soren	JMM	MGB	
Giridih	32	Giridih	Sudivya Kumar	JMM	MGB	Cabinet minister
Giridih	33	Dumri	Jairam Kumar Mahato	JLKM	None	
Bokaro	34	Gomia	Yogendra Prasad	JMM	MGB	Cabinet minister
Bokaro	35	Bermo	Kumar Jaimangal Singh	INC	MGB	
Bokaro	36	Bokaro	Shwettaa Singh	INC	MGB	
Bokaro	37	Chandankiyari	Umakant Rajak	JMM	MGB	
Dhanbad	38	Sindri	Bablu Mahato	CPI(ML)L	MGB	
Dhanbad	39	Nirsa	Arup Chatterjee	CPI(ML)L	MGB	
Dhanbad	40	Dhanbad	Raj Sinha	BJP	NDA	
Dhanbad	41	Jharia	Ragini Singh	BJP	NDA	
Dhanbad	42	Tundi	Mathura Prasad Mahato	JMM	MGB	
Dhanbad	43	Baghmara	Shatrughan Mahto	BJP	NDA	
East Singhbhum	44	Baharagora	Samir Mohanty	JMM	MGB	
East Singhbhum	45	Ghatsila	Ramdas Soren	JMM	MGB	Died on 15 August 2025
East Singhbhum	45	Ghatsila	Somesh Soren	JMM	MGB	Elected in 2025 by-election
East Singhbhum	46	Potka	Sanjib Sardar	JMM	MGB	
East Singhbhum	47	Jugsalai	Mangal Kalindi	JMM	MGB	
East Singhbhum	48	Jamshedpur East	Purnima Sahu	BJP	NDA	
East Singhbhum	49	Jamshedpur West	Saryu Roy	JD(U)	NDA	
Seraikela Kharsawan	50	Ichagarh	Sabita Mahato	JMM	MGB	
Seraikela Kharsawan	51	Seraikella	Champai Soren	BJP	NDA	
West Singhbhum	52	Chaibasa	Deepak Birua	JMM	MGB	Cabinet minister
West Singhbhum	53	Majhgaon	Niral Purty	JMM	MGB	
West Singhbhum	54	Jaganathpur	Sona Ram Sinku	INC	MGB	
West Singhbhum	55	Manoharpur	Jagat Majhi	JMM	MGB	
West Singhbhum	56	Chakradharpur	Sukhram Oraon	JMM	MGB	
Seraikela Kharsawan	57	Kharsawan	Dashrath Gagrai	JMM	MGB	
Ranchi	58	Tamar	Vikash Kumar Munda	JMM	MGB	
Khunti	59	Torpa	Sudeep Gudhiya	JMM	MGB	
Khunti	60	Khunti	Ram Surya Munda	JMM	MGB	
Ranchi	61	Silli	Amit Mahto	JMM	MGB	
Ranchi	62	Khijri	Rajesh Kachhap	INC	MGB	
Ranchi	63	Ranchi	C. P. Singh	BJP	NDA	
Ranchi	64	Hatia	Navin Jaiswal	BJP	NDA	
Ranchi	65	Kanke	Suresh Kumar Baitha	INC	MGB	
Ranchi	66	Mandar	Shilpi Neha Tirkey	INC	MGB	Cabinet minister
Gumla	67	Sisai	Jiga Susaran Horo	JMM	MGB	
Gumla	68	Gumla	Bhushan Tirkey	JMM	MGB	
Gumla	69	Bishunpur	Chamra Linda	JMM	MGB	Cabinet minister
Simdega	70	Simdega	Bhushan Bara	INC	MGB	
Simdega	71	Kolebira	Naman Bixal Kongari	INC	MGB	
Lohardaga	72	Lohardaga	Rameshwar Oraon	INC	MGB	
Latehar	73	Manika	Ramachandra Singh	INC	MGB	
Latehar	74	Latehar	Prakash Ram	BJP	NDA	
Palamu	75	Panki	Shashi Bhushan Mehta	BJP	NDA	
Palamu	76	Daltonganj	Alok Chaurasiya	BJP	NDA	
Palamu	77	Bishrampur	Naresh Prasad Singh	RJD	MGB	
Palamu	78	Chhatarpur	Radha Krishna Kishore	INC	MGB	Cabinet minister
Palamu	79	Hussainabad	Sanjay Kumar Yadav	RJD	MGB	
Garhwa	80	Garhwa	Satyendra Nath Tiwari	BJP	NDA	
Garhwa	81	Bhawanathpur	Anant Pratap Deo	JMM	MGB	

== Speakers of Legislative Assembly ==
No.	Name	Constituency	Term			Assembly	Party
1	Inder Singh Namdhari	Daltonganj	22 November 2000	29 March 2004	3 years, 128 days	1st	Janata Dal (United)
Acting	Bagun Sumbrai	Chaibasa	29 March 2004	29 May 2004	61 days	1st	Indian National Congress
(1)	Inder Singh Namdhari	Daltonganj	4 June 2004	11 August 2004	68 days	1st	Janata Dal (United)
2	Mrigendra Pratap Singh	Jamshedpur West	18 August 2004	11 January 2005	146 days	1st	Bharatiya Janata Party
Acting	Saba Ahmad	Tundi	12 January 2005	1 March 2005	48 days	1st	Rashtriya Janata Dal
(1)	Inder Singh Namdhari	Daltonganj	15 March 2005	14 September 2006	1 year, 183 days	2nd	Janata Dal (United)
3	Alamgir Alam	Pakur	20 October 2006	26 December 2009	3 years, 67 days	2nd	Indian National Congress
4	Chandreshwar Prasad Singh	Ranchi	6 January 2010	19 July 2013	3 years, 194 days	3rd	Bharatiya Janata Party
5	Shashank Shekhar Bhokta	Sarath	25 July 2013	23 December 2014	1 year, 151 days	3rd	Jharkhand Mukti Morcha
6	Dinesh Oraon	Sisai	7 January 2015	24 December 2019	4 years, 351 days	4th	Bharatiya Janata Party
7	Rabindra Nath Mahato	Nala	6 January 2020	Incumbent	6 years, 318 days	5th	Jharkhand Mukti Morcha
7	Rabindra Nath Mahato	Nala	6 January 2020	Incumbent	6 years, 318 days	6th	Jharkhand Mukti Morcha

== Leaders of the House ==
- ^{†} Died in office
- ^{§} Returned to office after a previous non-consecutive term

#	Portrait	Chief Minister (Birth-Death) Constituency	Election	Term of office			Political party	Ministry
#	Portrait	Chief Minister (Birth-Death) Constituency	Election	From	To	Period	Political party	Ministry
1		Babulal Marandi (born 1958); MLA for Ramgarh	2000 (1st)	15 November 2000	18 March 2003	2 years, 123 days	Bharatiya Janata Party	Marandi
2		Arjun Munda (born 1968); MLA for Kharsawan	2000 (1st)	18 March 2003	2 March 2005	1 year, 349 days	Bharatiya Janata Party	Munda I
3		Shibu Soren (1944–2025); Non-elected	2005 (2nd)	2 March 2005	12 March 2005	10 days	Jharkhand Mukti Morcha	Shibu I
(2)		Arjun Munda (born 1968); MLA for Kharsawan	2005 (2nd)	12 March 2005^{[§]}	18 September 2006	1 year, 190 days	Bharatiya Janata Party	Munda II
4		Madhu Koda (born 1971); MLA for Jaganathpur	2005 (2nd)	18 September 2006	27 August 2008	1 year, 344 days	Independent	Koda
(3)		Shibu Soren (1944–2025); Non-elected	2005 (2nd)	27 August 2008^{[§]}	19 January 2009	145 days	Jharkhand Mukti Morcha	Shibu II
Position vacant (19 January – 30 December 2009); President's rule was imposed during this period (Note: When President's rule is in force in a state, its council of ministers stands dissolved. The office of chief minister thus lies vacant. At times, the legislative assembly also stands dissolved.)
(3)		Shibu Soren (1944–2025); Non-elected	2009 (3rd)	30 December 2009^{[§]}	1 June 2010	153 days	Jharkhand Mukti Morcha	Shibu III
Position vacant (1 June – 11 September 2010); President's rule was imposed during this period
(2)		Arjun Munda (born 1968); MLA for Kharsawan	– (3rd)	11 September 2010^{[§]}	18 January 2013	2 years, 129 days	Bharatiya Janata Party	Munda III
Position vacant (18 January – 13 July 2013); President's rule was imposed during this period
5		Hemant Soren (born 1975); MLA for Dumka	– (3rd)	13 July 2013	28 December 2014	1 year, 168 days	Jharkhand Mukti Morcha	Hemant I
6		Raghubar Das (born 1955); MLA for Jamshedpur East	2014 (4th)	28 December 2014	29 December 2019	5 years, 1 day	Bharatiya Janata Party	Das
(5)		Hemant Soren (born 1975); MLA for Barhait	2019 (5th)	29 December 2019^{[§]}	2 February 2024	4 years, 35 days	Jharkhand Mukti Morcha	Hemant II
7		Champai Soren (born 1956); MLA for Seraikella	2019 (5th)	2 February 2024	3 July 2024	153 days	Jharkhand Mukti Morcha	Champai
(5)		Hemant Soren (born 1975); MLA for Barhait	2019 (5th)	4 July 2024^{[§]}	28 November 2024	2 years, 139 days	Jharkhand Mukti Morcha	Hemant III
(5)		Hemant Soren (born 1975); MLA for Barhait	2024 (6th)	28 November 2024^{[§]}	Incumbent	2 years, 139 days	Jharkhand Mukti Morcha	Hemant IV

== Leaders of the opposition ==
Colour key for parties
Jharkhand Mukti Morcha
Bharatiya Janata Party
Indian National Congress

No	Portrait	Name	Constituency	Term			Assembly (election)	Party
1		Stephen Marandi	Dumka	24 November 2000	10 July 2004	3 years, 229 days	1st (2000 election)	Jharkhand Mukti Morcha
2		Haji Hussain Ansari	Madhupur	2 August 2004	1 March 2005	211 days	1st (2000 election)	Jharkhand Mukti Morcha
3		Sudhir Mahato	Ichagarh	16 March 2005	18 September 2006	1 year, 186 days	2nd (2005 election)	Jharkhand Mukti Morcha
4		Arjun Munda	Kharsawan	4 December 2006	29 May 2009	2 years, 176 days	2nd (2005 election)	Bharatiya Janata Party
5		Rajendra Prasad Singh	Bermo	7 January 2010	18 January 2013	3 years, 11 days	3rd (2009 election)	Indian National Congress
(4)		Arjun Munda	Kharsawan	19 July 2013	23 December 2014	1 year, 157 days	3rd (2009 election)	Bharatiya Janata Party
6		Hemant Soren	Barhait	7 January 2015	28 December 2019	4 years, 355 days	4th (2014 election)	Jharkhand Mukti Morcha
7		Babulal Marandi	Dhanwar	24 February 2020	16 October 2023	3 years, 234 days	5th (2019 election)	Bharatiya Janata Party
8		Amar Kumar Bauri	Chandankiyari	16 October 2023	23 November 2024	1 year, 38 days	5th (2019 election)	Bharatiya Janata Party
(7)		Babulal Marandi	Dhanwar	6 March 2025	Incumbent	1 year, 259 days	6th (2024 election)	Bharatiya Janata Party

== See also ==
- List of chief ministers of Jharkhand
- List of constituencies of the Jharkhand Legislative Assembly
- List of deputy chief ministers of Jharkhand
- List of speakers of the Jharkhand Legislative Assembly
- List of leaders of the opposition in the Jharkhand Legislative Assembly
