= Champai Soren ministry =

Government of Jharkhand, India in 2024

- Ministry of the State of Jharkhand
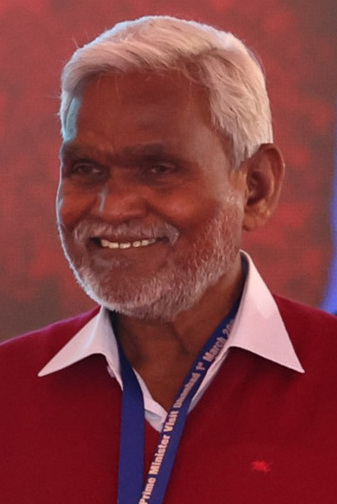
- Champai Soren; Hon'ble Chief Minister of Jharkhand
- Date formed: 2 February 2024
- Date dissolved: 3 July 2024

People and organisations
- Head of state: C. P. Radhakrishnan
- Head of government: Champai Soren
- Total no. of members: 11 (Including Chief Minister)
- Member parties: Government (48); MGB (48): JMM (29); INC (17); RJD (1); CPI(ML)L (1); Opposition; NDA (32): BJP (26); AJSU (3); NCP (1); IND (2); Maha Gathbandhan; INDIA
- Opposition party: NDA
- Opposition leader: Amar Kumar Bauri , BJP

History
- Outgoing election: 2019
- Legislature term: 5 years (Unless sooner dissolved)
- Predecessor: Second Hemant Soren ministry
- Successor: Third Hemant Soren ministry

This is a list of ministers from Champai Soren cabinet starting from 2 February 2024 until 3 July 2024.

== History ==
JMM leader Champai Soren was sworn in as Chief Minister on 2 February 2024 along with two other ministers from INC and RJD. Other INDIA alliance partners pledged support to new Government under Champai Soren.

The ministry was formed after former Chief Minister Hemant Soren resigned from the post amid corruption charges.

Cabinet Expansion took place on 16 February 2024 in raj bhawan 5 JMM MLAs and 3 INC MLAs took oath as ministers including former Chief Minister Hemant Soren younger brother Basant Soren and JMM mla Deepak Birua as new comers.And Joba Majhi was dropped from cabinet.

== Council of Ministers ==
Portfolio	Minister	Took office	Left office	Party
Chief Minister and also in-charge of: Department of Personnel, Administrative Reforms and Official Languages; Department of Home (Prisons); Cabinet Secretariat and Vigilance Department (excluding Parliamentary Affairs); And all other departments not allocated to any Minister.	Champai Soren	2 February 2024	3 July 2024	JMM
Minister of Rural Development; Minister of Rural Works; Minister of Panchayati Raj	Alamgir Alam	16 February 2024	11 June 2024	INC
Minister of Labour, Employment, Training and Skill Development; Minister of Industry	Satyanand Bhogta	16 February 2024	3 July 2024	RJD
Minister of Finance; Minister of Planning and Development; Minister of Commercial Tax; Minister of Food, Public Distribution and Consumer Affairs	Rameshwar Oraon	16 February 2024	3 July 2024	INC
Minister of Scheduled Tribes, Scheduled Castes and Backward Classes Welfare (excluding Minority Welfare); Minister of Transport	Deepak Birua	16 February 2024	3 July 2024	JMM
Minister of Health, Medical Education and Family Welfare; Minister of Disaster Management	Banna Gupta	16 February 2024	3 July 2024	INC
Minister of Agriculture, Animal Husbandry and Co-operation	Badal Patralekh	16 February 2024	3 July 2024	INC
Minister of Drinking Water and Sanitation; Minister of Excise and Prohibition	Mithilesh Kumar Thakur	16 February 2024	3 July 2024	JMM
Minister of Road Construction; Minister of Building Construction; Minister of Water Resources	Basant Soren	16 February 2024	3 July 2024	JMM
Minister of Minority Welfare; Minister of Registrations; Minister of Tourism, Art and Culture, Sports and Youth Affairs	Hafizul Hasan	16 February 2024	3 July 2024	JMM
Minister of Women, Child Development and Social Security	Baby Devi	16 February 2024	3 July 2024	JMM

== Ministers by Party ==
Representation of cabinet ministers by party
1. Jharkhand Mukti Morcha (60.0%)
2. Indian National Congress (30.0%)
3. Rashtriya Janata Dal (10.0%)

Party	Cabinet Ministers	Total Ministers
Jharkhand Mukti Morcha	6	6
Indian National Congress	3	3
Rashtriya Janata Dal	1	1
