= Seraikela Kharsawan district =

- District of Jharkhand
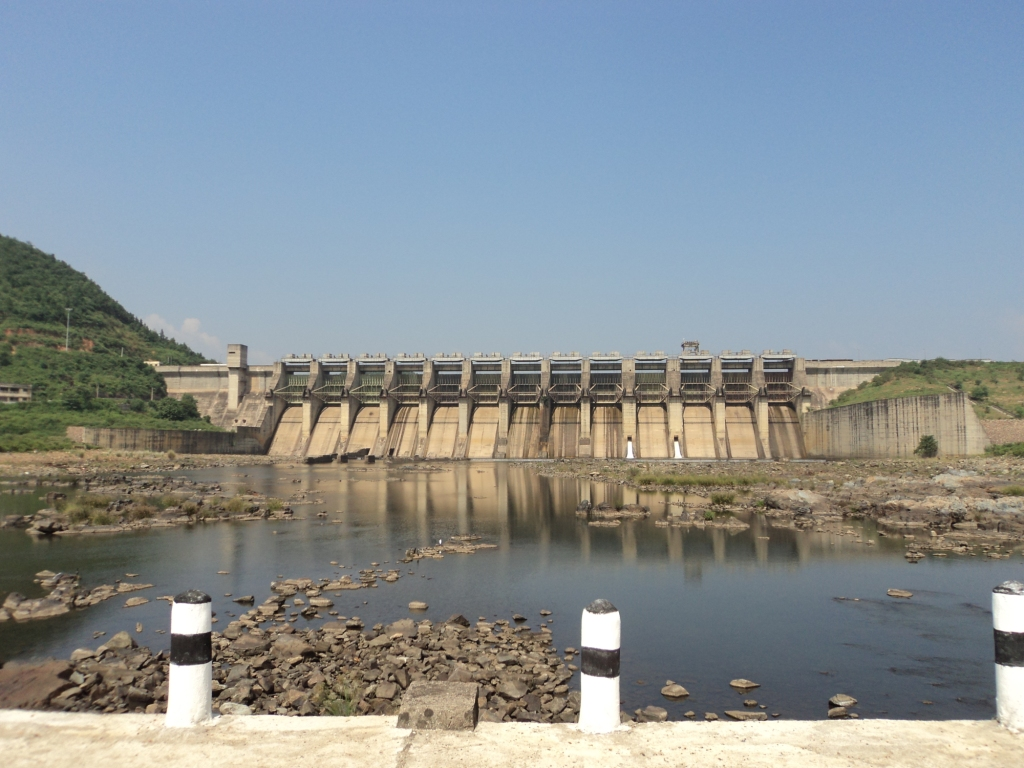
- Chandil Dam
- Interactive map of Seraikela Kharsawan district
- Country: India
- State: Jharkhand
- Division: Kolhan
- Established (as a district): April 4, 2001
- Headquarter: Seraikela

Government
  - Member of Parliament: Kali Charan Munda (INC); Sanjay Seth (BJP); Joba Majhi (JMM)
  - Deputy Commissioner: Ravi Shankar Shukla (IAS)
  - Superintendent of Police: Bimal Kumar (IPS)
  - Vidhan Sabha constituencies: Ichagarh, Seraikella, Kharsawan

Area
  - Total: 2,657 km^{2} (1,026 sq mi)
  - Urban: 69.25 km^{2} (26.74 sq mi)
  - Rural: 2,587.75 km^{2} (999.14 sq mi)

Population (2011)
  - Total: 1,065,056
  - Density: 400.8/km^{2} (1,038/sq mi)
  - Urban: 258,746 (24.29%)
  - Rural: 806,310 (75.71%)
  - Scheduled Castes: 56,195 (5.28%)
  - Scheduled Tribes: 374,642 (35.18%)

Demographic
  - Literacy rate: 67.70 %
  - Sex ratio: 958

Language
  - Official: Hindi
  - Regional: Ho, Mundari, Odia, Bengali and Santali
- Time zone: UTC+05:30 (IST)
- Vehicle registration: JH-22
- Average annual precipitation: 1350 mm
- Lok Sabha constituencies: 3 shared constituency: Ranchi; Singhbhum; Khunti
- Legislative Assembly Constituency: 3 constituency: 50- Ichagarh; 51- Seraikela; 57- Kharsawan
- Website: seraikela.nic.in

Seraikela Kharsawan district is one of the twenty-four districts of Jharkhand state in eastern India. Seraikela town is the district headquarters of Saraikela Kharsawan district . The district is well known for Seraikela Chhau, one of the three distinctive styles of the chhau dance. This district was carved out from West Singhbhum district in 2001. The district was formed from the princely states of Seraikela and Kharaswan, after the independence of India.

== History ==
=== Ruling dynasty ===
Members of the erstwhile royal family of Seraikella, the Singh Deo family (patrons of the Chhau dance), divide their time between The Palace, Seraikella; a 300-year-old heritage palace and historical landmark and their residences in Odisha, West Bengal and abroad. The last ruler of the Seraikella princely state was Aditya Pratap Singh Deo (grandson of HH Maharaja Udit Narayan Singh Deo) and notables of the era include his sons Tikayet Sahib Nrupendra Narayan Singh Deo, Raja Rajendra Narayan Singh Deo (given in adoption to Patna-Bolangir state, former Chief Minister of Odisha), Patayet Sahib Maharaj kumar Bhoopendra Narayan Singh Deo (leading regional politician who supported the popular tribal anti-merger movement with Bihar) and Rajkumar Sudhendra Narayan Singh Deo (Param-Guru of Chhau, a Padma Shri awardee).

The Singh Deo royal family remains active in public life (political, cultural and religious) and act as guardians to the Ma Paudi temple located within the royal residence, host the annual Chau festival at the Seraikella Royal Palace and retain a hold on the region's real-estate and business. Despite their loss of formal title and privileges, they enjoy public support in the area (comprising the former Seraikella state). Notable members of the royal family who remain active in the public eye include Rajkumar Pratap Aditya Singh Deo, Rajkumar Juga Bhanu Singh Deo, Maharajkumar Jairaj Singh Deo and Rajkumar Rajvikram Singh Deo. The District of Seraikela and Kharsawan was formed on 1 April 2001 after being separated from West Singhbhum.

=== Recent events ===
The district is currently a part of the Red Corridor.

== Geography ==
The district is situated between 22°29'26" and 23°09'34" north latitudes and 85°30'14" and 86°15'24" east longitudes.

=== Rivers and lakes ===
Several rivers flow across Seraikela Kharsawan district. Among these Subarnarekha, Kharkai, Korkori are the important ones. Chandil dam is one of the popular and famous waterbodies of the district. It is located near the Chandil town.

== Administration ==
=== Blocks/Mandals ===
Block map of Seraikela Kharsawan district, by subdivision

Seraikela Kharsawan district consists of 09 Blocks. The following are the list of the Blocks in Seraikela Kharsawan district:

- Chandil subdivision
1. Kukru
2. Ichagarh
3. Nimdih
4. Chandil
- Seraikela Sadar subdivision
1. Seraikela
2. Kharsawan
3. Adityapur (Gamharia)
4. Gobindpur (Rajnagar)
5. Kuchai

=== Panchayats and Villages ===
See: List of villages in Seraikela Kharsawan district

== Demographics ==
Historical population

Year	Pop.	±%
1901	190,062	—
1911	212,210	+11.7%
1921	224,453	+5.8%
1931	274,259	+22.2%
1941	327,053	+19.2%
1951	355,319	+8.6%

Year	Pop.	±%
1961	413,188	+16.3%
1971	493,874	+19.5%
1981	560,359	+13.5%
1991	707,175	+26.2%
2001	848,850	+20.0%
2011	1,065,056	+25.5%

Source: Census of India

Religion in Seraikela Kharsawan district (2011)
Religion	Percent
Hinduism	66.57%
Sarna	26.33%
Islam	5.97%
Christianity	0.76%
Other or not stated	1.13%

According to the 2011 census Seraikela Kharsawan district has a population of 1,065,056, roughly equal to the nation of Cyprus or the US state of Rhode Island. This gives it a ranking of 428th in India (out of a total of 640). The district has a population density of 401 inhabitants per square kilometre (1,040/sq mi). Its population growth rate over the decade 2001-2011 was 25.28%. Saraikela Kharsawan has a sex ratio of 958 females for every 1000 males, and a literacy rate of 67.70%. 24.29% of the population lives in urban areas. Scheduled Castes and Scheduled Tribes collectively account for 40.46% (SC 5.28% and ST 35.18%) of the district's total population. The prominent communities in this group, in terms of the district's total population, are Santal (12.19%), Ho (8.37%), Bhumij (6.38%), Munda (4.22%), Bhuiya (1.88%), Oraon (0.99%), Ghasi (0.98%), Dom (0.82%), Mahli (0.66%), Dhobi (0.49%), Kora (0.28%), Chamar/Mochi (0.28%), Lohra (0.24%), and Kol (0.15%). Other communities such as Mal Paharia, Dusadh, Pan, Bauri, Savar, Kharia, Bedia, Hari/Mehtar/Bhangi, Korwa, Rajwar, Pasi, Gond, and Birhor also have populations ranging between one thousand to a hundred.

=== Language ===
Languages of Seraikela-Kharsawan district (2011)
1. Bengali (44.0%)
2. Santali (12.5%)
3. Ho (9.65%)
4. Odia (9.48%)
5. Hindi (6.98%)
6. Mundari (4.76%)
7. Kurmali (3.03%)
8. Urdu (2.83%)
9. Bhojpuri (2.70%)
10. Maithili (1.05%)
11. Other (3.00%)

At the time of the 2011 Census of India, 44.01% of the population in the district spoke Bengali as their first language, 15.62% Santali, 9.65% Ho, 9.48% Odia, 6.98% Hindi, 4.76% Mundari, 2.83% Urdu, 2.7% Bhojpuri and 1.05% Maithili.

The district's official administrative language is Hindi, while Bengali predominates in rural areas. Various tribal languages are spoken across the district, and Odia is the primary language in the western part, historically associated with the former Saraikela State.

== Economy ==
Adityapur Industrial Area is situated in this district. It is one of the biggest industrial area after Noida. It houses many companies like Tata Steel, TAYO Growth Shop, Aadhunik Power Plant etc.

== Politics ==
There are three Vidhan Sabha constituencies in this district: Ichagarh, Seraikela and Kharsawan. These are parts of Ranchi, Singhbhum and Khunti Lok Sabha constituencies respectively.

District	No.	Constituency	Name	Party	Alliance	Remarks	Seraikela Kharsawan	50	Ichagarh	Sabita Mahato	JMM	MGB
51	Seraikella	Champai Soren		BJP	NDA		Seraikela Kharsawan					
Seraikela Kharsawan	57	Kharsawan	Dashrath Gagrai									
