= Champai Soren =

7th Chief Minister of Jharkhand in 2024

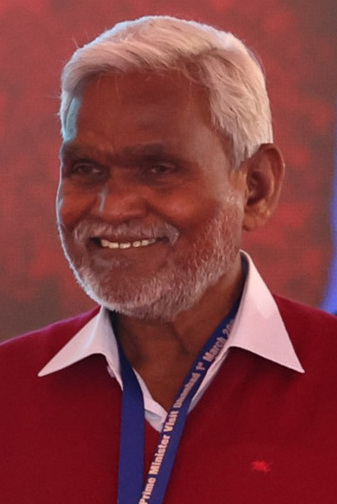
- Soren in 2024

7th Chief Minister of Jharkhand
- In office 2 February 2024 – 3 July 2024
- Governor: C. P. Radhakrishnan
- Preceded by: Hemant Soren
- Succeeded by: Hemant Soren

Leader of the House in Jharkhand Legislative Assembly
- In office 2 February 2024 – 3 July 2024
- Governor: C. P. Radhakrishnan
- Speaker: Rabindra Nath Mahato
- Preceded by: Hemant Soren
- Succeeded by: Hemant Soren

Cabinet Minister Government of Jharkhand
- In office 4 July 2024 – 28 August 2024
- Minister: Water Resources Department; Higher Education; Technical Education
- Governor: C. P. Radhakrishnan Santosh Gangwar
- Chief Minister: Hemant Soren
- In office 29 December 2019 – 31 January 2024
- Minister: Transport; Scheduled Tribe; Scheduled Caste; Minority; Backward Class Welfare
- Governor: Droupadi Murmu; Ramesh Bais
- Chief Minister: Hemant Soren
- In office 11 September 2010 – 18 January 2013
- Minister: Science and Technology; Labour; Housing
- Governor: M. O. H. Farook
- Chief Minister: Arjun Munda
- Deputy Chief Minister: Hemant Soren; Sudesh Mahto

Member of Jharkhand Legislative Assembly
- Incumbent
- Assumed office 27 February 2005
- Preceded by: Anant Ram Tudu
- Constituency: Seraikella

Member of Bihar Legislative Assembly
- In office 1991–2000
- Preceded by: Anant Ram Tudu
- Succeeded by: Anant Ram Tudu
- Constituency: Seraikella

Personal details
- Born: 11 November 1956 (age 69) Seraikela, Bihar, India (present-day Jharkhand)
- Party: Bharatiya Janata Party (2024–present)
- Other political affiliations: Jharkhand Mukti Morcha (1990–2024)
- Occupation: Politician

Champai Soren (born 11 November 1956) is an Indian politician who served as the 7th Chief Minister of Jharkhand from 2 February 2024 to 3 July 2024, following the arrest of former Chief Minister Hemant Soren by the Enforcement Directorate (ED) on allegations of money laundering. He served as a cabinet minister under Hemant Soren both before and after his tenure as Chief Minister.

== Early life and education ==
Soren was born in Jilinggora village in Seraikela Kharsawan district. He is a tribal leader and his father Simal Soren is a farmer. He studied till Grade 10 in a government school before entering politics. He has seven children.

== Career ==
Soren is an eight-time MLA. He was first elected from Seraikella in 1991 and served two-terms in the Bihar Legislative Assembly till 2000. During the separate Jharkhand state movement, he became a member of the Jharkhand Mukti Morcha (JMM). Before joining JMM, he served as an independent MLA. Later, he represented Seraikella assembly constituency in the Jharkhand Legislative Assembly continuously for four terms from 2000 to 2024.

He served as the Cabinet Minister of Transport, Scheduled Tribes and Scheduled Caste & Backward class welfare, Government of Jharkhand in the cabinet of 2nd Hemant Soren ministry from 2019 to 2024. In a sudden turn of events after former Chief Minister Hemant Soren was arrested, he was made the Chief Minister on 2 February 2024.

Hemant Soren once again assumed the office of Chief Minister of Jharkhand after his release from prison in June 2024. Champei Soren left Jharkhand Mukti Morcha after being allegedly humiliated by the party leadership and joined Bharatiya Janata Party in 2024. In August 2025, he was placed under house arrest to prevent law and order issues in view of protests by tribal outfits against land acquisition for a multi-crore state-run health institute.

== Positions held ==
From	To	Position
1991	1995	MLA in the 10th Bihar Assembly from Seraikella (by-poll)
1995	2000	MLA in the 11th Bihar Assembly from Seraikella
2000	2005	MLA in the 1st Jharkhand Assembly from Seraikella
2005	2009	MLA in the 2nd Jharkhand Assembly from Seraikella
2009	2014	MLA in the 3rd Jharkhand Assembly from Seraikella: Cabinet Minister - Science and Technology, Labour and Housing (11 Sep 2010 – 18 Jan 2013); Cabinet Minister - Food and Civil Supplies, Transport (13 July 2013 – 28 Dec 2014)
2014	2019	MLA in the 4th Jharkhand Assembly from Seraikella
2019	2024	MLA in the 5th Jharkhand Assembly from Seraikella: Cabinet Minister - Transport, Scheduled Tribes, Scheduled Caste & Backward class welfare (29 Dec 2019 – 31 Jan 2024); 7th Chief Minister of Jharkhand (2 Feb 2024 – 4 Jul 2024); Cabinet Minister - Water Resources, Higher and Technical Education (4 Jul 2024 – 28 Aug 2024)
2024	Incumbent	MLA in the 6th Jharkhand Assembly from Seraikella

== Electoral history ==
=== Indian general elections ===
Year	Constituency	Party	Votes	%	Result
2019	Jamshedpur	JMM	542	33.00	Lost

=== Legislative Assembly elections ===
Year	Constituency	Party	Votes	%	Result
1991^	Seraikella	JMM			Won
1995	Seraikella	JMM	36,926	31.80	Won
2000	Seraikella	JMM	40,550	37.16	Lost
2005	Seraikella	JMM	61,112	40.81	Won
2009	Seraikella	JMM	57,156	38.34	Won
2014	Seraikella	JMM	94,746	45.40	Won
2019	Seraikella	JMM	111,554	48.58	Won
2024	Seraikella	BJP	11	44.27	Won

^by-election
