= Khunti Assembly constituency =

Constituency of the Jharkhand legislative assembly in India

Coordinates: 23.069°N 85.278°E

Khunti
- Constituency No. 60 for the Jharkhand Legislative Assembly

Constituency details
- Country: India
- Region: East India
- State: Jharkhand
- District: Khunti
- Lok Sabha constituency: Khunti
- Established: 2000
- Total electors: 211,074
- Reservation: ST

Member of Legislative Assembly
- 5th Jharkhand Legislative Assembly
- Incumbent Ram Surya Munda
- Party: JMM
- Alliance: MGB
- Elected year: 2024

Khunti Assembly constituency is an assembly constituency in the Indian state of Jharkhand.

Most successful parties after separate Jharkhand state.
1. BJP (80.0%)
2. JMM (20.0%)

== Members of the Legislative Assembly ==
Election	Member	Party
Bihar Legislative Assembly
1952	Lucas Munda	Jharkhand Party
1957	Bir Singh Munda	Jharkhand Party
1962	Phulchand Kachchap	Janata Party
1967	Tiru Muchirai Munda	Indian National Congress
1969	Tiru Muchirai Munda	Indian National Congress
1972	Tiru Muchirai Munda	Indian National Congress
1977	Khudia Pahan	Janata Party
1980	Samu Pahan	Indian National Congress
1985	Sushila Kerketta	Indian National Congress
1990	Sushila Kerketta	Indian National Congress
1995	Sushila Kerketta	Indian National Congress
2000	Nilkanth Singh Munda	Bharatiya Janata Party
Jharkhand Legislative Assembly
2005	Nilkanth Singh Munda	Bharatiya Janata Party
2009	Nilkanth Singh Munda	Bharatiya Janata Party
2014	Nilkanth Singh Munda	Bharatiya Janata Party
2019	Nilkanth Singh Munda	Bharatiya Janata Party
2024	Ram Surya Munda	Jharkhand Mukti Morcha

== Election results ==
=== Assembly election 2024 ===
2024 Jharkhand Legislative Assembly election: Khunti
Party	Candidate	Votes	%	±%
JMM	Ram Surya Munda	91,721	57.38	▲32.55
BJP	Nilkanth Singh Munda	49,668	31.07	▼13.64
JLKM	Bi Anil Kumar	3,865	2.42	New
BSP	Alok Ritesh Dungdung	2,085	1.30	▲0.11
Independent	Pastar Sanjay Kumar Tirkey	2,057	1.29	New
Independent	Vishwakarma Oraon	1,969	1.23	New
Independent	Durgawati Oreya	1,947	1.22	New
NOTA	None of the Above	3,547	2.22	▼0.64
Margin of victory		42,053	26.31	▲6.42
Turnout		1,59,842	70.79	▲8.06
Registered electors		2,25,809		▲6.98
JMM gain from BJP		Swing	▲12.67	

=== Assembly election 2019 ===
2019 Jharkhand Legislative Assembly election: Khunti
Party	Candidate	Votes	%	±%
BJP	Nilkanth Singh Munda	59,198	44.71	▲5.70
JMM	Sushil Pahan	32,871	24.83	▲3.66
JVM(P)	Dayamani Barla	20,726	15.66	▲12.44
Independent	Masih Charan Munda	6,964	5.26	New
Independent	Pastar Sanjay Kumar Tirkey	1,653	1.25	New
BTP	Meenakshi Munda	1,623	1.23	New
BSP	Soma Kaitha	1,579	1.19	New
NOTA	None of the Above	3,785	2.86	▼0.05
Margin of victory		26,327	19.89	▲2.04
Turnout		1,32,392	62.72	▼0.62
Registered electors		2,11,074		▲10.90
BJP hold		Swing	▲5.70	

=== Assembly election 2014 ===
2014 Jharkhand Legislative Assembly election: Khunti
Party	Candidate	Votes	%	±%
BJP	Nilkanth Singh Munda	47,032	39.01	▲5.27
JMM	Jidan Horo	25,517	21.16	▼12.12
INC	Pushpa Surin	17,544	14.55	▼6.61
Jharkhand Party	Jura Pahan	10,504	8.71	▲7.50
JVM(P)	Jakariyas Tiru	3,874	3.21	New
SP	Madiray Munda	3,660	3.04	New
Rashtriya Deshaj Party	Ram Shankar Oreya	2,450	2.03	New
NOTA	None of the Above	3,512	2.91	New
Margin of victory		21,515	17.84	▲17.39
Turnout		1,20,566	63.34	▲6.29
Registered electors		1,90,333		▲14.26
BJP hold		Swing	▲5.27	

=== Assembly election 2009 ===
2009 Jharkhand Legislative Assembly election: Khunti
Party	Candidate	Votes	%	±%
BJP	Nilkanth Singh Munda	32,067	33.74	▼12.02
JMM	Masi Charan Munda	31,631	33.28	New
INC	Roshan Kumar Surin	20,116	21.17	▼8.14
RJD	Chonhas Khalkho	2,438	2.57	New
Independent	Sudarshan Sanga	2,164	2.28	New
BSP	Marshal Barla	1,649	1.74	▲0.62
Jharkhand Party	Dasay Munda	1,155	1.22	▼10.56
Margin of victory		436	0.46	▼15.99
Turnout		95,043	57.05	▼5.63
Registered electors		1,66,586		▲9.43
BJP hold		Swing	▼12.02	

=== Assembly election 2005 ===
2005 Jharkhand Legislative Assembly election: Khunti
Party	Candidate	Votes	%	±%
BJP	Nilkanth Singh Munda	43,663	45.76	▼0.87
INC	Roshan Kumar Surin	27,963	29.30	▼6.34
Jharkhand Party	Alistair Bodra	11,240	11.78	▼3.23
Independent	Shyam Sundar Kachhap	3,109	3.26	New
Independent	Manjula Oraon	2,788	1.97	New
BSP	Baijnath Singh Munda	1,585	1.12	New
Independent	Vijay Singh Munda	821	0.58	New
Margin of victory		15,700	16.45	▲5.47
Turnout		95,423	62.68	▲7.16
Registered electors		1,52,237		▲16.51
BJP hold		Swing	▼0.87	

=== Assembly election 2000 ===
2000 Bihar Legislative Assembly election: Khunti
Party	Candidate	Votes	%	±%
BJP	Nilkanth Singh Munda	33,828	46.63	New
INC	Sushila Kerketta	25,857	35.64	New
Jharkhand Party	Sanatan Kandir	10,886	15.01	New
RJD	Folen Kujur	1,740	2.40	New
Margin of victory		7,971	10.99	
Turnout		72,547	56.52	
Registered electors		1,30,663		
BJP win (new seat)				

== See also ==
- Vidhan Sabha
- List of states of India by type of legislature
