= Chief Minister of Jharkhand =

Leader of the executive branch of Government of Jharkhand

- Jhārkhaṇḍ Kē Mukhya Mantrī
- Emblem of Jharkhand

- Flag of India

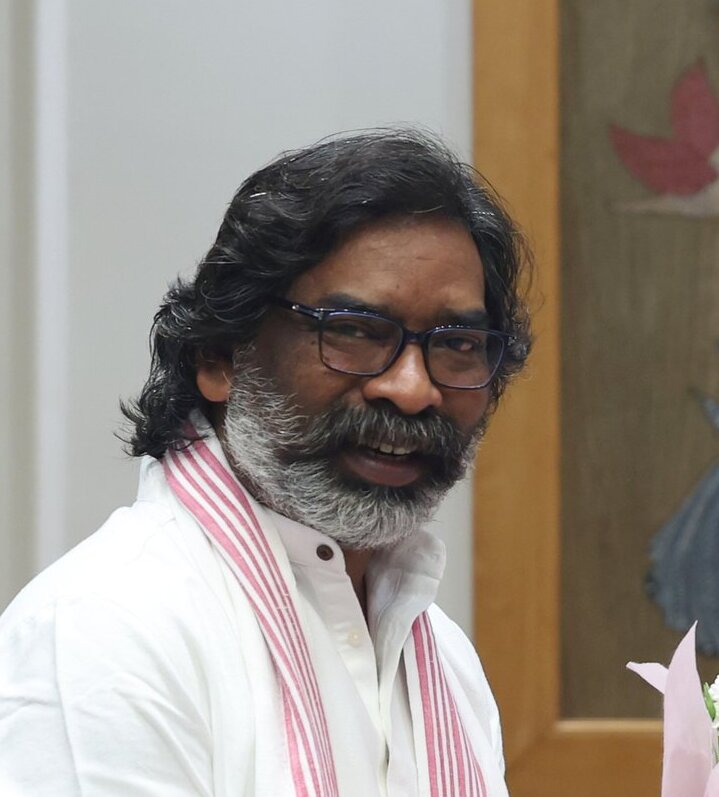
- Incumbent; Hemant Soren since 4 July 2024
- Chief Minister's Office; Government of Jharkhand
- Style: The Honourable
- Type: Head of government
- Status: Leader of the Executive
- Abbreviation: CMoJharkhand
- Member of: State Cabinet; Legislative Assembly
- Reports to: Governor of Jharkhand; Jharkhand Legislative Assembly
- Residence: Jinx, Kanke Road, Ranchi
- Seat: State Secretariat, Ranchi
- Nominator: MLAs of the majority party or alliance
- Appointer: Governor of Jharkhand; by convention based on appointees ability to command confidence in the Jharkhand Legislative Assembly
- Term length: At the confidence of the assembly; Chief minister's term is for 5 years and is subject to no term limits.
- Precursor: Chief Minister of Bihar
- Inaugural holder: Babulal Marandi
- Formation: 15 November 2000 (25 years ago)
- Deputy: Deputy Chief Minister of Jharkhand
- Salary: ₹272,000 (US$2,800)/monthly; ₹3,000,000 (US$31,000)/annually
- Website: cm.jharkhand.gov.in

The Chief Minister of Jharkhand is the chief executive of the Indian state of Jharkhand. In accordance with the Constitution of India, the governor is a state's de jure head, but de facto executive authority rests with the chief minister. Following elections to the Jharkhand Legislative Assembly, the state's governor usually invites the party (or coalition) with a majority of seats to form the government. The governor appoints the chief minister, whose council of ministers are collectively responsible to the assembly. Given the confidence of the assembly, the chief minister's term is for five years and is subject to no term limits.Chief Minister also serves as Leader of the House in the Legislative Assembly.

Seven people have served as the state's chief minister since Jharkhand's formation on 15 November 2000. Half of them, including the inaugural officeholder Babulal Marandi and Arjun Munda, represented the Bharatiya Janata Party (BJP). Hemant Soren, from the JMM, is the longest-serving chief minister. Three chief ministers, Shibu Soren, his son Hemant Soren, and Champai Soren, represented the Jharkhand Mukti Morcha (JMM). Shibu Soren's first term ended in just ten days, as he could not prove that he had the support of a majority of the house and was forced to resign. The state has also been governed by Madhu Koda, one of the few independents to become the chief minister of any state. In between their reigns, the state has also been under President's rule three times. Raghubar Das, of the BJP, was the first non-tribal and first chief minister to complete a full term in the state. Hemant Soren of the Jharkhand Mukti Morcha is the incumbent chief minister.

== Oath as the state chief minister ==
The chief minister serves five years in the office. The following is the oath of the chief minister of state:

I, <Name of Chief Minister>, do swear in the name of God/solemnly affirm that I will bear true faith and allegiance to the Constitution of India as by law established, that I will uphold the sovereignty and integrity of India, that I will faithfully and conscientiously discharge my duties as a Minister for the State of () and that I will do right to all manner of people in accordance with the Constitution and the law without fear or favour, affection or ill-will.

Oath of Secrecy

"I, [Name], do swear in the name of God / solemnly affirm that I will not directly or indirectly communicate or reveal to any person or persons any matter which shall be brought under my consideration or shall become known to me as a Minister for the State of [Name of State] except as may be required for the due discharge of my duties as such Minister."Pad ki Shapath (Oath of Office) "Main, [CM ka Naam], Ishwar ki shapath leta hoon / satyanishtha se pratigyan karta hoon ki main vidhi dwara sthapit Bharat ke Samvidhan ke prati sachi shraddha aur nishtha rakhunga. Main Bharat ki prabhuta aur akhandta akshunn rakhunga. Main [State ka Naam] ke Rajya ke Mukhya Mantri ke roop mein apne kartavyon ka shraddhapoorvak aur shuddh antahkaran se nirvahan karunga, tatha main bhay ya pakshpat, anurag ya dwesh ke bina, sabhi prakar ke logon ke prati Samvidhan aur vidhi ke anusar nyay karunga." B. Gopniyata ki Shapath (Oath of Secrecy) "Main, [CM ka Naam], Ishwar ki shapath leta hoon / satyanishtha se pratigyan karta hoon ki jo vishay [State ka Naam] ke Rajya ke Mukhya Mantri ke roop mein mere vichar ke liye laya jayega athva mujhe gyaat hoga, use kisi vyakti ya vyaktityon ko, tab ke sivay jab ki aise Mukhya Mantri ke roop mein apne kartavyon ke uchit nirvahan ke liye aisa karna apekshit ho, main pratyaksh (directly) ya apratyaksh (indirectly) roop mein sansuchit ya prakat nahi karunga."

== List of the Chief Ministers (2000-present) ==
- ^{†} Died in office
- ^{§} Returned to office after a previous non-consecutive term

#	Portrait	Chief Minister (Birth-Death) Constituency	Election	Term of office			Political party	Ministry
#	Portrait	Chief Minister (Birth-Death) Constituency	Election	From	To	Period	Political party	Ministry
1		Babulal Marandi (born 1958); MLA for Ramgarh	2000 (1st)	15 November 2000	18 March 2003	2 years, 123 days	Bharatiya Janata Party	Marandi
2		Arjun Munda (born 1968); MLA for Kharsawan	2000 (1st)	18 March 2003	2 March 2005	1 year, 349 days	Bharatiya Janata Party	Munda I
3		Shibu Soren (1944–2025); Non-elected	2005 (2nd)	2 March 2005	12 March 2005	10 days	Jharkhand Mukti Morcha	Shibu I
(2)		Arjun Munda (born 1968); MLA for Kharsawan	2005 (2nd)	12 March 2005^{[§]}	18 September 2006	1 year, 190 days	Bharatiya Janata Party	Munda II
4		Madhu Koda (born 1971); MLA for Jaganathpur	2005 (2nd)	18 September 2006	27 August 2008	1 year, 344 days	Independent	Koda
(3)		Shibu Soren (1944–2025); Non-elected	2005 (2nd)	27 August 2008^{[§]}	19 January 2009	145 days	Jharkhand Mukti Morcha	Shibu II
Position vacant (19 January – 30 December 2009); President's rule was imposed during this period (Note: When President's rule is in force in a state, its council of ministers stands dissolved. The office of chief minister thus lies vacant. At times, the legislative assembly also stands dissolved.)
(3)		Shibu Soren (1944–2025); Non-elected	2009 (3rd)	30 December 2009^{[§]}	1 June 2010	153 days	Jharkhand Mukti Morcha	Shibu III
Position vacant (1 June – 11 September 2010); President's rule was imposed during this period
(2)		Arjun Munda (born 1968); MLA for Kharsawan	– (3rd)	11 September 2010^{[§]}	18 January 2013	2 years, 129 days	Bharatiya Janata Party	Munda III
Position vacant (18 January – 13 July 2013); President's rule was imposed during this period
5		Hemant Soren (born 1975); MLA for Dumka	– (3rd)	13 July 2013	28 December 2014	1 year, 168 days	Jharkhand Mukti Morcha	Hemant I
6		Raghubar Das (born 1955); MLA for Jamshedpur East	2014 (4th)	28 December 2014	29 December 2019	5 years, 1 day	Bharatiya Janata Party	Das
(5)		Hemant Soren (born 1975); MLA for Barhait	2019 (5th)	29 December 2019^{[§]}	2 February 2024	4 years, 35 days	Jharkhand Mukti Morcha	Hemant II
7		Champai Soren (born 1956); MLA for Seraikella	2019 (5th)	2 February 2024	3 July 2024	153 days	Jharkhand Mukti Morcha	Champai
(5)		Hemant Soren (born 1975); MLA for Barhait	2019 (5th)	4 July 2024^{[§]}	28 November 2024	2 years, 105 days	Jharkhand Mukti Morcha	Hemant III
(5)		Hemant Soren (born 1975); MLA for Barhait	2024 (6th)	28 November 2024^{[§]}	Incumbent	2 years, 105 days	Jharkhand Mukti Morcha	Hemant IV

== Statistics ==
Fraction of time of holding CMO by party (as of 26 August 2026)
1. Bharatiya Janata Party (51.1%)
2. Jharkhand Mukti Morcha (34.8%)
3. Independent (7.53%)
4. President's Rule (6.62%)

#	Chief Minister	Party	Term of office	
#	Chief Minister	Party	Longest term	Total duration
1	Hemant Soren*	JMM*	4 years, 35 days*	7 years, 308 days*
2	Arjun Munda	BJP	2 years, 129 days	5 years, 307 days
3	Raghubar Das	BJP	5 years, 1 day	5 years, 1 day
4	Babulal Marandi	BJP	2 years, 123 days	2 years, 123 days
5	Madhu Koda	IND	1 year, 343 days	1 year, 343 days
0	President's rule	NONE	345 days	1 year, 258 days
6	Shibu Soren	JMM	153 days	308 days
7	Champai Soren	JMM	153 days	153 days
