= Seraikella Assembly constituency =

Constituency of the Jharkhand legislative assembly in India

Coordinates: 22.700°N 85.929°E

Seraikella
- Constituency No. 51 for the Jharkhand Legislative Assembly

Constituency details
- Country: India
- Region: East India
- State: Jharkhand
- District: Seraikela Kharsawan
- Lok Sabha constituency: Singhbhum
- Established: 2000
- Total electors: 337,174
- Reservation: ST

Member of Legislative Assembly
- 5th Jharkhand Legislative Assembly
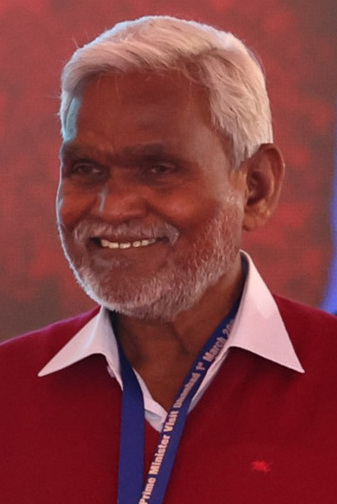
- Incumbent Champai Soren
- Party: BJP
- Alliance: NDA
- Elected year: 2024
- Preceded by: Anant Ram Tudu

Seraikella Assembly constituency is an assembly constituency in the Indian state of Jharkhand.

== Overview ==
According to the Delimitation of Parliamentary and Assembly Constituencies Order, 2008 of the Election Commission of India, Seraikela Assembly constituency covers Seraikella municipality and Govindpur, Pandra, Manik Bazar, Tangrani, Pathanmara, Jordiha, Gurgudia and Badakakda gram panchayats in Seraikella police station, Rajnagar police station (excluding village 98-Dighi) and Adityapur police station. It is a reserved constituency for Scheduled Tribes. Kharsawan (Vidhan Sabha constituency) is part of Singhbhum (Lok Sabha constituency).

== Members of the Legislative Assembly ==
Election	Member	Party
Bihar Legislative Assembly
1952	Mihir Kavi	All India Ganatantra Parishad
1957	Aditya Pratap Singh Deo	Independent politician
1962	Nrupendra Narayan Singh Deo	Independent politician
1967	R.P. Sarangi	Bharatiya Jana Sangh
1969	Banbihari Manto	Independent politician
1972	Shatbhanu Singh Deo	Indian National Congress
1977	Kade Majhi	Janata Party
1980	Kade Majhi	Bharatiya Janata Party
1985	Krishna Mardi	Jharkhand Mukti Morcha
1990	Krishna Mardi	Jharkhand Mukti Morcha
1991^	Champai Soren	Jharkhand Mukti Morcha
1995	Champai Soren	Jharkhand Mukti Morcha
2000	Anant Ram Tudu	Bharatiya Janata Party
Jharkhand Legislative Assembly
2005	Champai Soren	Jharkhand Mukti Morcha
2009	Champai Soren	Jharkhand Mukti Morcha
2014	Champai Soren	Jharkhand Mukti Morcha
2019	Champai Soren	Jharkhand Mukti Morcha
2024	Champai Soren	Bhartiya Janata Party

^by-election

== Election results ==
=== Assembly election 2024 ===
2024 Jharkhand Legislative Assembly election: Seraikella
Party	Candidate	Votes	%	±%
BJP	Champai Soren	119,379	44.27	▲2.51
JMM	Ganesh Mahali	98,932	36.69	▼11.89
JLKM	Prem Mardi	40,056	14.85	New
NOTA	None of the Above	3,482	1.29	▼0.42
Margin of victory		20,447	7.58	▲0.76
Turnout		2,69,654	72.97	▲4.86
Registered electors		3,69,562		▲9.61
BJP gain from JMM		Swing	▼4.31	

=== Assembly election 2019 ===
2019 Jharkhand Legislative Assembly election: Seraikella
Party	Candidate	Votes	%	±%
JMM	Champai Soren	111,554	48.58	▲3.18
BJP	Ganesh Mahali	95,887	41.76	▼3.11
AJSU	Anant Ram Tudu	9,956	4.34	New
BSP	Ravindra Oraon	2,503	1.09	New
API	Bishwa Vijay Mardi	2,074	0.90	New
JVM(P)	Anil Soren	1,985	0.86	▲0.29
JD(U)	Satyanarayan Gond	1,723	0.75	New
NOTA	None of the Above	3,940	1.72	▼0.15
Margin of victory		15,667	6.82	▲6.29
Turnout		2,29,622	68.10	▼3.90
Registered electors		3,37,174		▲16.32
JMM hold		Swing	▲3.18	

=== Assembly election 2014 ===
2014 Jharkhand Legislative Assembly election: Seraikella
Party	Candidate	Votes	%	±%
JMM	Champai Soren	94,746	45.40	▲7.06
BJP	Ganesh Mahali	93,631	44.86	▲8.70
INC	Basko Besra	6,890	3.30	▼7.88
Independent	Hari Oraon	2,368	1.13	New
Independent	Bishu Hembram	1,252	0.60	New
JVM(P)	Sokhen Hembram	1,209	0.58	New
NOTA	None of the Above	3,893	1.87	New
Margin of victory		1,115	0.53	▼1.64
Turnout		2,08,700	72.00	▲6.26
Registered electors		2,89,858		▲27.82
JMM hold		Swing	▲7.06	

=== Assembly election 2009 ===
2009 Jharkhand Legislative Assembly election: Seraikella
Party	Candidate	Votes	%	±%
JMM	Champai Soren	57,156	38.34	▼2.47
BJP	Laxhman Tudu	53,910	36.16	▼4.06
INC	Kalipad Soren	16,668	11.18	New
JBSP	Anant Ram Tudu	7,793	5.23	New
Independent	Hari Orawn	2,092	1.40	New
BSP	Mangal Manjhi	2,031	1.36	New
RJD	Sarita Hembrom	1,654	1.11	▼1.07
Margin of victory		3,246	2.18	▲1.59
Turnout		1,49,082	65.74	▲1.23
Registered electors		2,26,773		▼2.31
JMM hold		Swing	▼2.47	

=== Assembly election 2005 ===
2005 Jharkhand Legislative Assembly election: Seraikella
Party	Candidate	Votes	%	±%
JMM	Champai Soren	61,112	40.81	▲3.66
BJP	Lakxhman Tudu	60,230	40.22	▼4.98
AJSU	Basko Besra	15,096	10.08	New
RJD	Banshi Dhar Majhi	3,265	2.18	▼0.07
Independent	Singu Majhi	2,389	1.60	New
Independent	Rajkumar Sardar	2,311	1.54	New
Independent	Chami Murmu	2,000	1.34	New
Margin of victory		882	0.59	▼7.46
Turnout		1,49,745	64.51	▲8.69
Registered electors		2,32,129		▲18.73
JMM gain from BJP		Swing	▼4.39	

=== Assembly election 2000 ===
2000 Bihar Legislative Assembly election: Seraikella
Party	Candidate	Votes	%	±%
BJP	Anant Ram Tudu	49,333	45.20	New
JMM	Champai Soren	40,550	37.16	New
INC	Mahendra Nath Murmu	10,160	9.31	New
Independent	Durga Tiu	3,204	2.94	New
BSP	Subarmanium Baskey	2,929	2.68	New
RJD	Vishu Hembrom	2,451	2.25	New
Margin of victory		8,783	8.05	
Turnout		1,09,136	56.73	
Registered electors		1,95,509		
BJP win (new seat)				

== See also ==
- Vidhan Sabha
- List of states of India by type of legislature
