= Sammari Lal =

Indian politician

Sammari Lal is an Indian politician and an MLA elected from Kanke block of Jharkhand state as a member of Bharatiya Janata Party 2019.
