= 2009 Jharkhand Legislative Assembly election =

Elections held in 2009

- 25 November – 18 December 2009

81 seats of Jharkhand Legislative Assembly 41 seats needed for a majority
- Turnout: 56.97 (▼0.03)
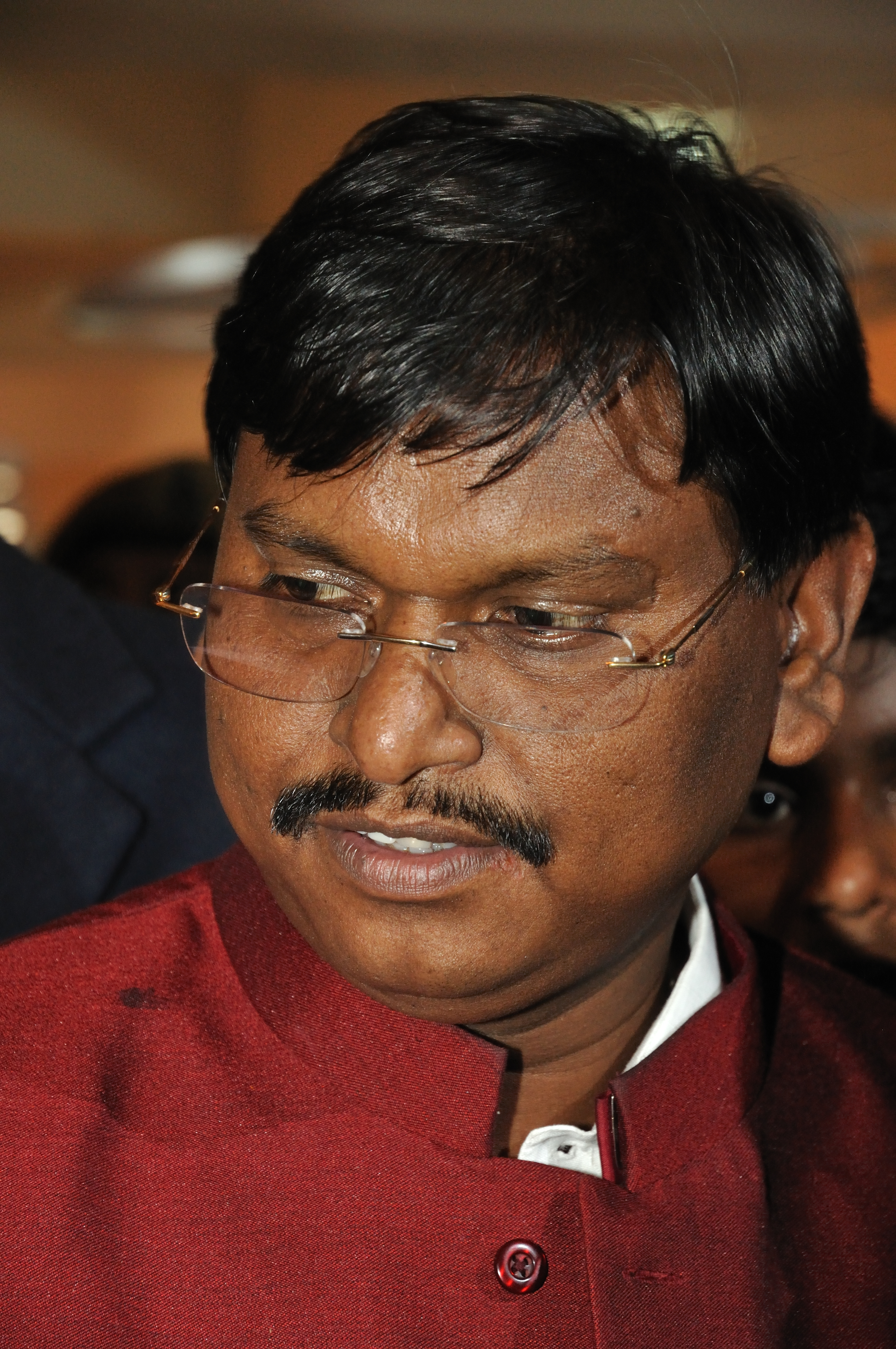

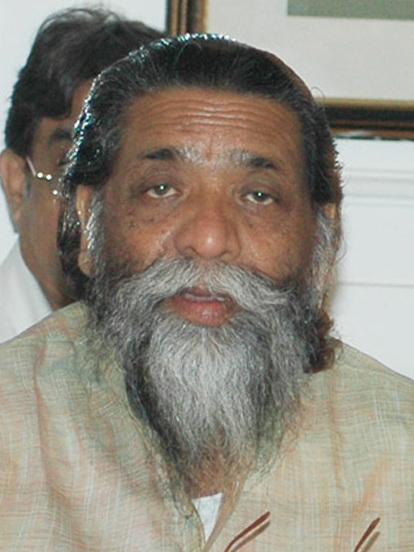

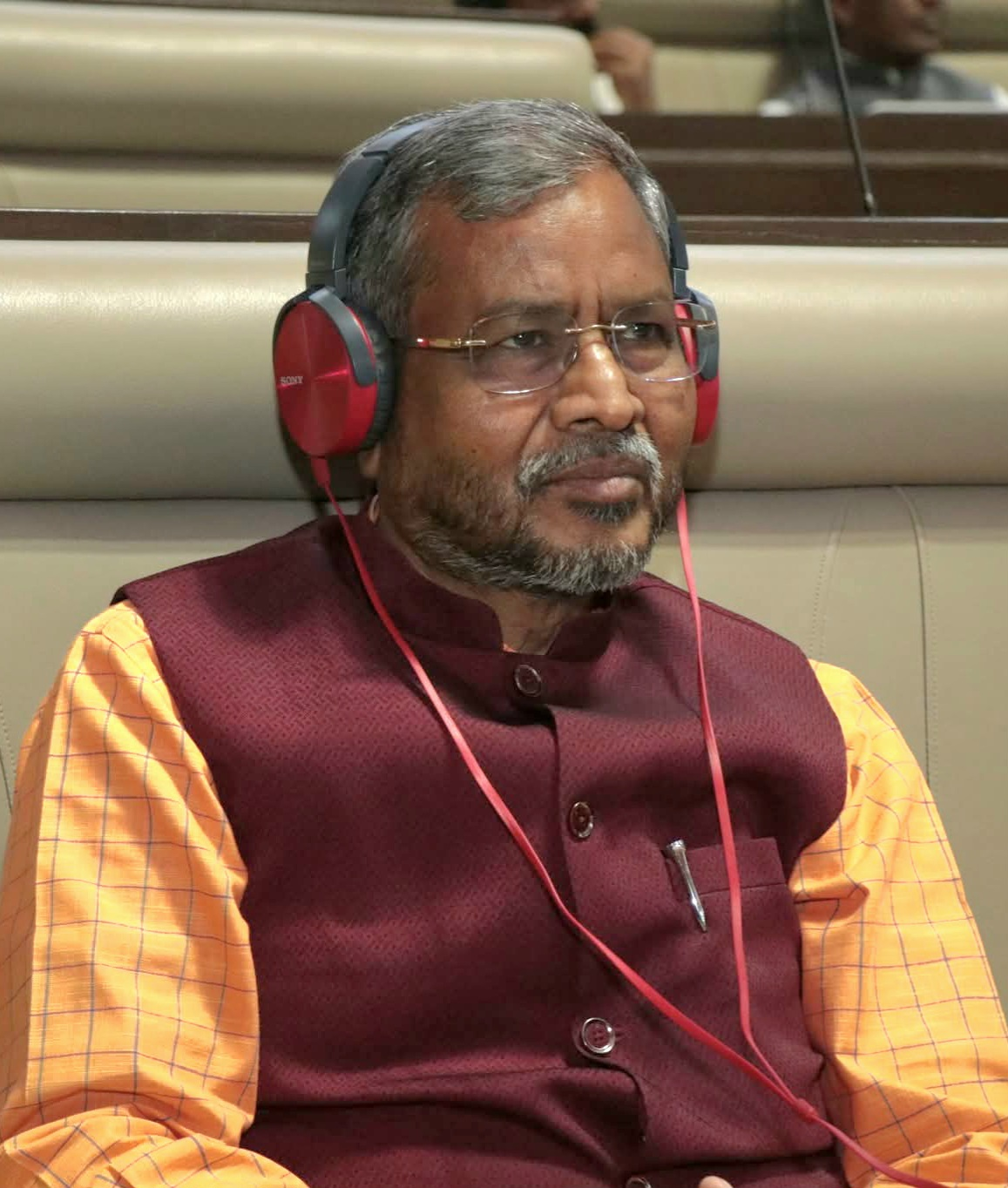

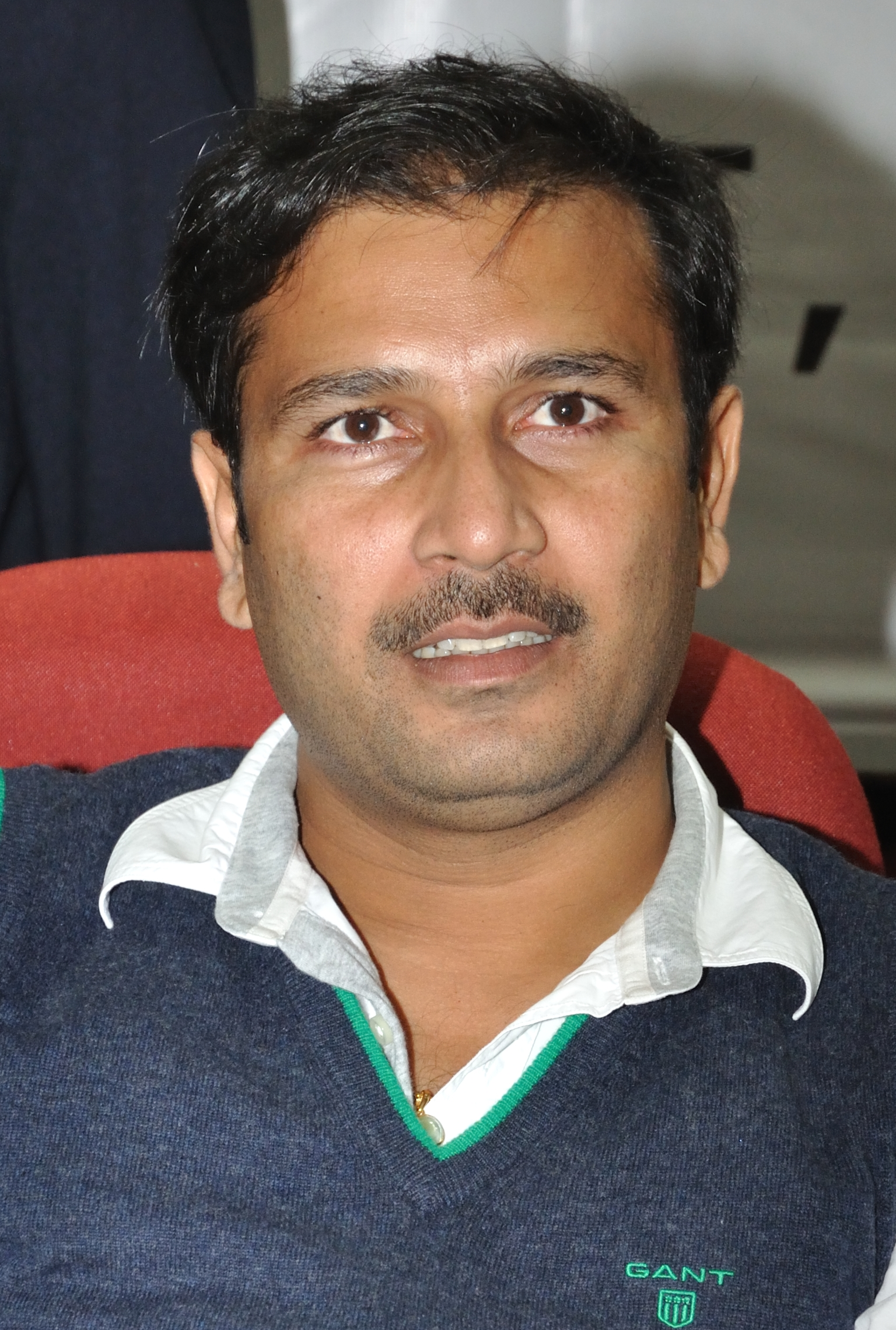

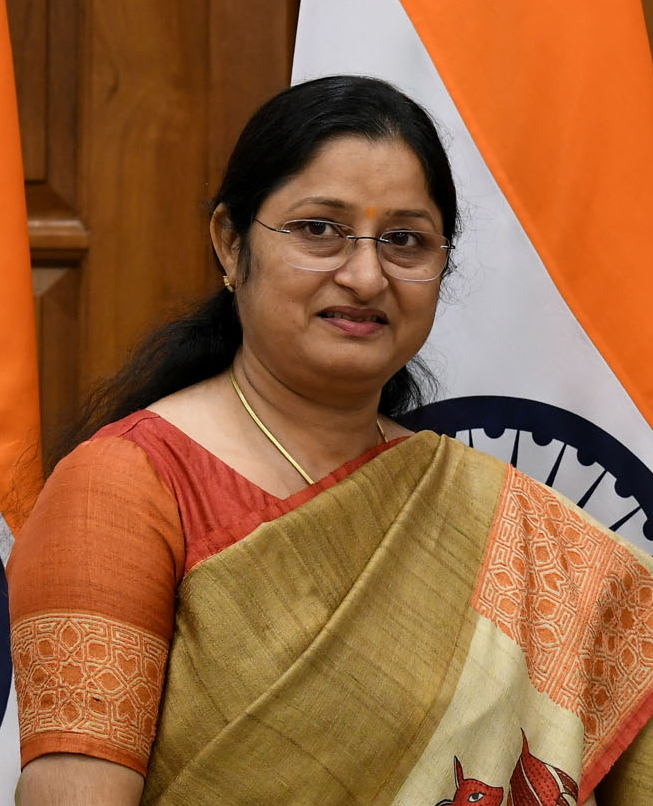
	Majority party	Minority party	Third party
Leader	Arjun Munda	Shibu Soren	Pradeep Kumar Balmuchu
Party	BJP	JMM	INC
Alliance	NDA	UPA	UPA
Leader's seat	Kharsawan (Won in by-poll:2011)	Did Not Contest (Note: Soren was the sitting MP for Dumka)	Ghatsila (lost)
Last election	30	17	9
Seats won	18	18	14
Seat change	▼12	▲1	▲5
Popular vote	2,074,215	1,562,060	1,660,977
Percentage	20.18%	15.20%	16.16%
Swing	▼3.39%	▲0.91%	▲4.11%
	Fourth party	Fifth party	Sixth party
Leader	Babulal Marandi	Sudesh Mahto	Annpurna Devi
Party	JVM(P)	AJSU	RJD
Alliance	UPA	-	UPA
Leader's seat	Did Not Contest (Note: Marandi was the sitting MP for Kodarma)	Silli (Won)	Kodarma (Won)
Last election	New	2	7
Seats won	11	5	5
Seat change	New	▲3	▼2
Popular vote	923,671	526,231	517,324
Percentage	8.99%	5.12%	5.03%
Swing	New	▲2.31%	▼3.45%
- Seatwise map of the election results

- Structure of the Jharkhand Legislative Assembly after the election
Chief Minister before election
Madhu Koda
Independent
Elected Chief Minister
Shibu Soren
JMM

The 2009 Jharkhand Legislative Assembly election resulted in a fragmented assembly, with no single party achieving a clear majority. The Bharatiya Janata Party (BJP) won a plurality winning 18 seats though the Jharkhand Mukti Morcha (JMM) also secured 18 seats but with a lower vote share, while the Indian National Congress won 14 seats. The Jharkhand Vikas Morcha (Prajatantrik) (JVM-P) obtained 11 seats, and several smaller parties, including the All Jharkhand Students’ Union (AJSU) and Rashtriya Janata Dal (RJD), captured a few seats as well.

Shibu Soren of the JMM was able to form a government in December 2009 with support from various smaller parties, including the BJP. However, this coalition government was short-lived; the BJP withdrew its support in June 2010, leading to the government's collapse shortly thereafter .

== Parties and Alliances ==
Party/Alliance		Flag	Symbol	Leader	Seats
NDA	Bharatiya Janata Party			Arjun Munda	67
NDA	Janata Dal (United)			Nitish Kumar	14
UPA	Indian National Congress			Pradeep Kumar Balmuchu	61
UPA	Jharkhand Vikas Morcha (P)			Babulal Marandi	25
Jharkhand Mukti Morcha				Shibu Soren	77
Rashtriya Janata Dal				Lalu Prasad Yadav	56
All Jharkhand Students Union				Sudesh Mahato	54

== Results ==
Party	Votes	%	Seats	+/–
Bharatiya Janata Party	2,074,215	20.18	18	▼12
Jharkhand Mukti Morcha	1,562,060	15.20	18	▲1
Indian National Congress	1,660,977	16.16	14	▲5
Jharkhand Vikas Morcha (Prajatantrik)	923,671	8.99	11	–
All Jharkhand Students Union	526,231	5.12	5	–
Rashtriya Janata Dal	517,324	5.03	5	–
Janata Dal (United)	285,565	2.78	2	–
Communist Party of India (Marxist–Leninist) Liberation	241,436	2.35	1	–
Jharkhand Party	112,821	1.10	1	–
Marxist Co-ordination Committee	112,821	1.10	1	–
Jai Bharat Samanta Party	93,280	0.91	1	–
Jharkhand Janadikhar Manch	74,320	0.72	1	–
Rashtriya Kalyan Paksha	72,401	0.70	1	–
Others	930,876	9.06	0	–
Independent (politician)	1,091,011	10.61	2	–
Total	10,279,009	100.00	81	0
Valid votes	10,279,009	99.98		
Invalid/blank votes	1,993	0.02		
Total votes	10,281,002	100.00		
Registered voters/turnout	18,045,638	56.97		
Source: ECI

== Results by constituency ==
Constituency		Winner				Runner Up				Margin	%
#	Name	Candidate	Party	Votes	%	Candidate	Party	Votes	%	Margin	%
1	Rajmahal	Arun Mandal	BJP	51,277	37.67	Md. Tajuddin	JMM	40,874	30.03	10,403	7.64
2	Borio (ST)	Lobin Hembram	JMM	37,586	32.98	Tala Marandi	BJP	28,546	25.05	9,040	7.93
3	Barhait (ST)	Hemlal Murmu	JMM	40,621	40.04	Vijay Hansdak	IND	20,303	20.01	20,318	20.03
4	Litipara (ST)	Simon Marandi	JMM	29,875	31.45	Anil Murmu	INC	24,478	25.77	5,397	5.68
5	Pakhur	Aquil Akhtar	JMM	62,246	36.80	Alamgir Alam	INC	56,570	33.44	5,676	3.36
6	Maheshpur (ST)	Mistri Soren	JVM(P)	50,746	44.70	Devidhan Tudu	BJP	28,772	25.34	21,974	19.36
7	Shikaripara (ST)	Nalin Soren	JMM	30,474	28.30	Paritosh Soren	JVM(P)	29,471	27.37	1,003	0.93
8	Nala	Satyanand Jha	BJP	38,119	31.38	Rabindra Nath Mahato	JMM	34,171	28.13	3,948	3.25
9	Jamtara	Bishnu Prasad Bhaiya	JMM	62,795	46.60	Furkan Ansari	INC	49,952	37.07	12,843	9.53
10	Dumka (ST)	Hemant Soren	JMM	35,129	30.98	Lois Marandi	BJP	32,460	28.63	2,669	2.35
11	Jama (ST)	Sita Soren	JMM	38,550	39.33	Manoj Kumar Singh	BJP	25,844	26.37	12,706	12.96
12	Jarmundi	Harinarayan Ray	IND	33,512	28.87	Devendra Kunwar	JMM	23,025	19.84	10,487	9.03
13	Madhupur	Hussain Ansari	JMM	47,880	32.45	Shiv Dutt Sharma	JVM(P)	27,412	18.58	20,468	13.87
14	Sarath	Sasank Shekhar Bhokta	JMM	40,282	29.70	Uday Shankar Singh	INC	30,862	22.76	9,420	6.94
15	Deoghar (SC)	Suresh Paswan	RJD	49,602	36.40	Baldeo Das	JVM(P)	31,862	23.38	17,740	13.02
16	Poreyahat	Pradip Yadav	JVM(P)	67,105	48.23	Suraj Mandal	JMM	30,401	21.85	36,704	26.38
17	Godda	Sanjay Prasad Yadav	RJD	43,502	31.09	Raghu Nandan Mandal	BJP	34,747	24.83	8,755	6.26
18	Mahagama	Rajesh Ranjan	INC	43,834	31.16	Ashok Kumar	BJP	35,648	25.34	8,186	5.82
19	Kodarma	Annapurna Devi	RJD	46,922	31.85	Ramesh Singh	JVM(P)	29,639	20.12	17,283	11.73
20	Barkatha	Amit Kumar Yadav	BJP	39,485	27.79	Janki Pr Yadav	JVM(P)	30,117	21.20	9,368	6.59
21	Barhi	Umashankar Akela	BJP	60,044	46.53	Manoj Yadav	INC	51,959	40.27	8,085	6.26
22	Barkagaon	Yogendra Saw	INC	38,683	25.92	Loknath Mahto	BJP	37,319	25.01	1,364	0.91
23	Ramgarh	Chandra Prakash Choudhary	AJSU	61,947	39.64	Shahzada Anwar	INC	36,472	23.34	25,475	16.30
24	Mandhu	Teklal Mahto	JMM	37,198	22.03	Kumar Mahesh Singh	INC	29,220	17.31	7,978	4.72
25	Hazaribagh	Saurabh Narain Singh	INC	66,514	45.18	Deo Dayal	BJP	57,227	38.87	9,287	6.31
26	Simaria (SC)	Jai Prakash Singh Bhogta	JVM(P)	34,007	25.82	Ganesh Ganjhu	JMM	25,982	19.73	8,025	6.09
27	Chatra (SC)	Janardan Paswan	RJD	67,441	50.99	Subedar Paswan	BJP	28,886	21.84	38,555	29.15
28	Dhanwar	Nizamuddin Ansari	JVM(P)	50,392	34.59	Raj Kumar Yadav	CPI(ML)	45,419	31.17	4,973	3.42
29	Bagodar	Vinod Kumar Singh	CPI(ML)	54,436	36.55	Nagendra Mahto	JVM(P)	47,718	32.04	6,718	4.51
30	Jamua (SC)	Chandrika Mahtha	JVM(P)	42,824	33.89	Satya Narayan Das	CPI(ML)	24,297	19.23	18,527	14.66
31	Gandey	Sarfraz Ahmad	INC	39,625	30.23	Salkhan Soren	JMM	31,170	23.78	8,455	6.45
32	Giridih	Nirbhay Kumar Shahabadi	JVM(P)	28,771	26.25	Munna Lal	IND	21,669	19.77	7,102	6.48
33	Dumri	Jagarnath Mahto	JMM	33,960	34.27	Damodar Prasad Mahto	JD(U)	20,292	20.47	13,668	13.80
34	Gomiya	Madhav Lal Singh	INC	31,540	23.39	Yogendra Prasad	AJSU	23,237	17.23	8,303	6.16
35	Bermo	Rajendra Prasad Singh	INC	47,744	34.03	Yogeshwar Mahto	BJP	41,133	29.32	6,611	4.71
36	Bokaro	Samresh Singh	JVM(P)	53,757	26.95	Md. Izrail Ansari	INC	37,452	18.78	16,305	8.17
37	Chandankyari (SC)	Umakant Rajak	AJSU	36,620	30.47	Amar Kumar Bauri	JVM(P)	33,103	27.55	3,517	2.92
38	Sindri	Phul Chand Mandal	JVM(P)	40,048	28.54	Anand Mahato	MCO	36,288	25.86	3,760	2.68
39	Nirsa	Arup Chatterjee	MCO	68,965	43.80	Ashok Kumar Mandal	BJP	33,388	21.20	35,577	22.60
40	Dhanbad	Manan Mallick	INC	55,641	35.03	Raj Kumar Sinha	BJP	54,751	34.47	890	0.56
41	Jharia	Kunti Devi	BJP	49,131	40.52	Suresh Singh	INC	46,115	38.03	3,016	2.49
42	Tundi	Mathura Prasad Mahato	JMM	40,787	30.12	Saba Ahmad	JVM(P)	39,869	29.44	918	0.68
43	Baghmara	Dulu Mahato	JVM(P)	56,026	40.44	Jaleshwar Mahato	JD(U)	36,066	26.03	19,960	14.41
44	Baharagora	Bidyut Baran Mahato	JMM	59,228	43.09	Dinesh Kumar Sarangi	BJP	42,074	30.61	17,154	12.48
45	Ghatshila (ST)	Ramdas Soren	JMM	38,283	30.19	Pradeep Kumar Balmuchu	INC	37,091	29.25	1,192	0.94
46	Potka (ST)	Menaka Sardar	BJP	44,095	33.36	Subodh Singh Sardar	INC	28,385	21.47	15,710	11.89
47	Jugashlai (SC)	Ram Chandra Sahis	AJSU	42,810	28.63	Rakhi Roy	BJP	39,328	26.30	3,482	2.33
48	Jamshedpur East	Raghubar Das	BJP	56,165	50.29	Abhay Singh	JVM(P)	33,202	29.73	22,963	20.56
49	Jamshedpur West	Banna Gupta	INC	55,638	45.29	Saryu Roy	BJP	52,341	42.61	3,297	2.68
50	Ichagarh	Arvind Kumar Singh	JVM(P)	45,465	32.09	Bishwa Ranjan Mahato	AJSU	27,829	19.64	17,636	12.45
51	Saraikella (ST)	Champai Soren	JMM	57,156	38.34	Laxhman Tudu	BJP	53,910	36.16	3,246	2.18
52	Chaibasa (ST)	Deepak Birua	JMM	30,274	29.40	Bagun Sumbrui	INC	22,726	22.07	7,548	7.33
53	Majhganon (ST)	Barkuwar Gagrai	BJP	34,534	35.69	Niral Purty	JMM	24,644	25.47	9,890	10.22
54	Jaganathpur (ST)	Geeta Kora	JBSP	37,145	45.23	Sonaram Birua	BJP	11,405	13.89	25,740	31.34
55	Manoharpur (ST)	Guru Charan Nayak	BJP	27,360	28.16	Navami Oraon	JMM	21,090	21.71	6,270	6.45
56	Chakradharpur (ST)	Laxman Giluwa	BJP	26,984	28.14	Sukhram Oraon	JMM	26,694	27.84	290	0.30
57	Kharasawan (ST)	Mangal Singh Soy	BJP	52,661	47.02	Basko Besra	INC	25,442	22.71	27,219	24.31
58	Tamar (ST)	Gopal Krishna Patar	JD(U)	30,678	34.38	Vikas Kumar Munda	AJSU	29,207	32.73	1,471	1.65
59	Torpa (ST)	Paulus Surin	JMM	34,551	40.78	Koche Munda	BJP	18,752	22.13	15,799	18.65
60	Khunti (ST)	Nilkanth Singh Munda	BJP	32,067	33.74	Masi Charan Munda	JMM	31,631	33.28	436	0.46
61	Silli	Sudesh Kumar Mahto	AJSU	45,673	38.99	Amit Kumar	JVM(P)	37,966	32.41	7,707	6.58
62	Khijri (ST)	Sawna Lakra	INC	41,172	28.71	Ram Kumar Pahan	BJP	38,394	26.77	2,778	1.94
63	Ranchi	Chandreshwar Prasad Singh	BJP	66,161	56.87	Pradeep Tulsyan	INC	39,050	33.57	27,111	23.30
64	Hatia	Gopal S.N. Shahdeo	INC	39,921	26.58	Ram Ji Lal Sharda	BJP	39,896	26.57	25	0.01
65	Kanke (SC)	Ramchandra Baitha	BJP	45,245	31.30	Suresh Baitha	INC	40,674	28.14	4,571	3.16
66	Mandar (ST)	Bandhu Tirkey	JJM (Note: Jharkhand Janadhikar Manch)	58,924	38.06	Deo Kumar Dhan	INC	28,953	18.70	29,971	19.36
67	Sisai (ST)	Geeta Shree Oraon	INC	39,260	34.37	Samir Oraon	BJP	24,319	21.29	14,941	13.08
68	Gumla (ST)	Kamlesh Oraon	BJP	39,555	38.28	Bhushan Tirkey	JMM	27,468	26.58	12,087	11.70
69	Bishunpur (ST)	Chamra Linda	RKP (Note: Rashtriya Krantikari Janata Party)	44,461	36.98	Shiv Kumar Bhagat	INC	27,751	23.08	16,710	13.90
70	Simdega (ST)	Vimla Pradhan	BJP	38,476	33.18	Neil Tirkey	INC	37,363	32.22	1,113	0.96
71	Kolebira (ST)	Anosh Ekka	JKP	28,834	28.87	Mahendra Bhagat	BJP	21,332	21.36	7,502	7.51
72	Lohardaga (ST)	Kamal Kishor Bhagat	AJSU	35,816	30.73	Sukhdeo Bhagat	INC	35,210	30.21	606	0.52
73	Manika (ST)	Harikrishna Singh	BJP	18,645	21.98	Rameshwar Oraon	INC	16,876	19.90	1,769	2.08
74	Latehar (SC)	Baidyanath Ram	BJP	34,522	32.86	Prakash Ram	RJD	34,084	32.44	438	0.42
75	Panki	Bidesh Singh	IND	38,458	34.60	Madhu Singh	JD(U)	18,240	16.41	20,218	18.19
76	Daltonganj	Krishna Nand Tripathi	INC	43,571	29.66	Dileep Singh Namdhari	BJP	39,338	26.78	4,233	2.88
77	Bishrampur	Chandrashekhar Dubey	INC	25,609	20.77	Ramchandra Chandravanshi	RJD	17,257	14.00	8,352	6.77
78	Chattarpur (SC)	Sudha Choudhary	JD(U)	25,854	28.23	Manoj Kumar	JMM	16,108	17.59	9,746	10.64
79	Hussainabad	Sanjay Kumar Singh Yadav	RJD	26,735	23.54	Kushwaha Shiv Pujan Mehta	BSP	23,172	20.40	3,563	3.14
80	Garhwa	Satyendra Nath Tiwari	JVM(P)	50,474	33.64	Girinath Singh	RJD	40,412	26.94	10,062	6.70
81	Bhawanathpur	Anant Pratap Deo	INC	54,690	34.68	Bhanu Pratap Shahi	NSM (Note: Navjawan Sangharsh Morcha)	32,522	20.62	22,168	14.06

== Government Formation ==
A compromise formula was worked out between the BJP-JD(U) Alliance and the JMM. These two groups, with the help of independents and other minor parties, had run the state government, and the president rules the state.

== Bypolls (2009-2014) ==
S.No	Date	Constituency	MLA before election	Party before election	Elected MLA	Party after election
57	10 February 2011	Kharsawan	Mangal Singh Soy	Bharatiya Janata Party	Arjun Munda	Bharatiya Janata Party
24	30 November 2011	Mandu	Tek Lal Mahto	Jharkhand Mukti Morcha	Jai Prakash Bhai Patel	Jharkhand Mukti Morcha
64	12 June 2012	Hatia	Gopal Sharan Nath Shahdeo	Indian National Congress	Navin Jaiswal	All Jharkhand Students Union
