= Kharsawan Assembly constituency =

Electoral district in Jharkhand

Coordinates: 22.782°N 85.821°E

Kharsawan
- Constituency No. 57 for the Jharkhand Legislative Assembly

Constituency details
- Country: India
- Region: East India
- State: Jharkhand
- District: Seraikela Kharsawan
- Lok Sabha constituency: Khunti
- Established: 2000
- Total electors: 209,017
- Reservation: ST

Member of Legislative Assembly
- 6th Jharkhand Legislative Assembly
- Incumbent Dashrath Gagrai
- Party: JMM
- Alliance: MGB
- Elected year: 2024

Kharsawan Assembly constituency is an assembly constituency in the Indian state of Jharkhand.

Most successful parties after separate Jharkhand state.
1. JMM (50.0%)
2. BJP (50.0%)

== Overview ==
As defined in the Delimitation of Parliamentary and Assembly Constituencies Order, 2008, Kharsawan Assembly constituency covers Kharsawan and Kuchai police stations and Seraikella police station (excluding Seraikella municipality and Govindpur, Para, Manik Bazar, Tangrani, Pathanmara, Jordiha Gurugudia and Badakakda gram panchayats), village 98-Dighi in Rajnagar police station, and Bhoya Keadchalam, Domra Parnia, Lota, Thakurgutu, Dopai-Gamhariya, Sarda, Matkamhatu, Khuntpani, Chiru and Rajabasa gram panchayats in Chaibasa Mufassil police station.

The constituency is reserved for members of Scheduled Tribes. Kharsawan Assembly constituency is within Khunti Lok Sabha constituency.

== Members of Legislative Assembly ==
Election	Member	Party
Bihar Legislative Assembly
1952	Ujindra Lal Ho	Jharkhand Party
1957-67: Constituency did not exist
1967	Debilal Matisoy	Bharatiya Jana Sangh
1969	Chandra Mohan Manjhi	Independent politician
1972	Gulab Singh Munda	All India Jharkhand Party
1977	Debilal Matisoy	Janata Party
1980	Debilal Matisoy	Bharatiya Janata Party
1985	Vijay Singh Soy	Independent politician
1990	Vijay Singh Soy	Indian National Congress
1995	Arjun Munda	Jharkhand Mukti Morcha
2000	Arjun Munda	Bharatiya Janata Party
Jharkhand Legislative Assembly
2005	Arjun Munda	Bharatiya Janata Party
2009	Mangal Singh Soy	Bharatiya Janata Party
2011^	Arjun Munda	Bharatiya Janata Party
2014	Dashrath Gagrai	Jharkhand Mukti Morcha
2019	Dashrath Gagrai	Jharkhand Mukti Morcha
2024	Dashrath Gagrai	Jharkhand Mukti Morcha

^by-election

== Election results ==
=== Assembly election 2024 ===
2024 Jharkhand Legislative Assembly election: Kharsawan
Party	Candidate	Votes	%	±%
JMM	Dashrath Gagrai	85,772	47.24	▼0.91
BJP	Sonaram Bodra	53,157	29.28	▼3.91
JLKM	Pandu Ram Haiburu	33,841	18.64	New
Independent	Hiralal Hembrom	1,350	0.74	New
Independent	Sanjay Jarika	1,182	0.65	New
NOTA	None of the Above	3,356	1.85	▲0.79
Margin of victory		32,615	17.96	▲3.00
Turnout		1,81,571	79.81	▲6.94
Registered electors		2,27,503		▲8.84
JMM hold		Swing	▼0.91	

=== Assembly election 2019 ===
2019 Jharkhand Legislative Assembly election: Kharsawan
Party	Candidate	Votes	%	±%
JMM	Dashrath Gagrai	73,341	48.15	▼1.00
BJP	Jawahar Lal Banra	50,546	33.19	▼7.79
AJSU	Sanjay Jarika	9,451	6.21	New
JVM(P)	Ram Honhaga	3,134	2.06	▲0.34
Independent	Hiralal Hembram	2,589	1.70	New
Independent	Bhagwat Prasad Majhi	2,498	1.64	New
JD(U)	Kunvar Sinh Banra	1,742	1.14	New
NOTA	None of the Above	1,614	1.06	▼0.81
Margin of victory		22,795	14.97	▲6.80
Turnout		1,52,311	72.87	▼4.89
Registered electors		2,09,017		▲10.94
JMM hold		Swing	▼1.00	

=== Assembly election 2014 ===
2014 Jharkhand Legislative Assembly election: Kharsawan
Party	Candidate	Votes	%	±%
JMM	Dashrath Gagrai	72,002	49.15	New
BJP	Arjun Munda	60,036	40.98	▼14.36
INC	Chhotray Kisku	4,927	3.36	New
JVM(P)	Pradhan Pasingh Gundua	2,523	1.72	New
Jharkhand Party	Mangilal Purty	1,639	1.12	New
JBSP	Kande Ram Kurli	993	0.68	New
Independent	Lalji Ram Tiu	852	0.58	New
NOTA	None of the Above	2,746	1.87	New
Margin of victory		11,966	8.17	▼7.45
Turnout		1,46,499	77.76	▲5.66
Registered electors		1,88,397		▲21.64
JMM gain from BJP		Swing	▼6.19	

=== Assembly by-election 2011 ===
2011 Jharkhand Legislative Assembly by-election: Kharsawan
Party	Candidate	Votes	%	±%
BJP	Arjun Munda	61,801	55.34	▲8.33
	Dashrath Gagrai	44,355	39.72	New
Independent	Hari Orawn	1,843	1.65	New
Communist Party of India (Marxist Leninist) Liberation	Bahadur Oraon	1,177	1.05	New
Independent	K. Ram Kurli	1,057	0.95	New
Independent	M. S. Hembram	849	0.76	New
Independent	M. S. Jamuda	589	0.53	New
Margin of victory		17,446	15.62	▼8.68
Turnout		1,11,671	72.10	▼0.42
Registered electors		1,54,880		▲0.28
BJP hold		Swing	▲8.33	

=== Assembly election 2009 ===
2009 Jharkhand Legislative Assembly election: Kharsawan
Party	Candidate	Votes	%	±%
BJP	Mangal Singh Soy	52,661	47.02	▼21.41
INC	Basko Besra	25,442	22.71	▲4.92
JBSP	Chhotray Kisku	9,906	8.84	New
Rashtriya Deshaj Party	Nitima Bodra Bari	6,035	5.39	New
Independent	Kande Ram Kurli	3,574	3.19	New
BSP	Kujuri Honhaga	2,051	1.83	▲0.55
Independent	Bhagwat Prasad Majhi	1,984	1.77	New
Margin of victory		27,219	24.30	▼26.33
Turnout		1,12,007	72.52	▲5.93
Registered electors		1,54,453		▼5.91
BJP hold		Swing	▼21.41	

=== Assembly election 2005 ===
2005 Jharkhand Legislative Assembly election: Kharsawan
Party	Candidate	Votes	%	±%
BJP	Arjun Munda	74,797	68.43	▲17.65
INC	Kunti Soy	19,453	17.80	▼17.39
Independent	Shiv Charan Hansda	4,841	4.43	New
Independent	Sagu Charan Hembram	2,569	2.35	New
BSP	Gora Purti	1,395	1.28	▼0.10
Jharkhand Party	Bhagwat Prasad Majhi	1,305	1.19	New
Independent	Shankar Bandra	783	0.72	New
Margin of victory		55,344	50.63	▲35.04
Turnout		1,09,308	66.59	▲5.39
Registered electors		1,64,155		▲14.58
BJP hold		Swing	▲17.65	

=== Assembly election 2000 ===
2000 Bihar Legislative Assembly election: Kharsawan
Party	Candidate	Votes	%	±%
BJP	Arjun Munda	44,521	50.78	New
INC	Vijay Singh Soy	30,847	35.18	New
JMM	Lal Singh Leyangi	6,771	7.72	New
UGDP	Ashok Kumar Tiu	2,490	2.84	New
BSP	Budhan Singh Hembrom	1,207	1.38	New
RJD	Lakhi Ram Majhi	549	0.63	New
Independent	Jag Mohan Soy	504	0.57	New
Margin of victory		13,674	15.60	
Turnout		87,679	62.89	
Registered electors		1,43,272		
BJP win (new seat)				

== See also ==
- Vidhan Sabha
- List of states of India by type of legislature
