= Arjun Munda =

Indian politician (b. 1968)

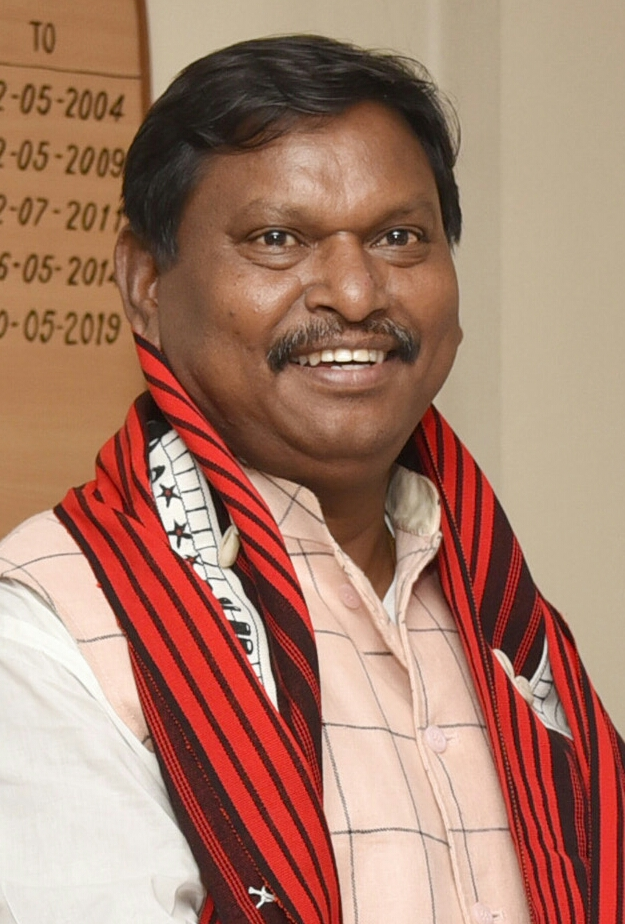

Union Minister of Agriculture and Farmer's Welfare
- In office 7 December 2023 – 11 June 2024
- Prime Minister: Narendra Modi
- Preceded by: Narendra Singh Tomar
- Succeeded by: Shivraj Singh Chauhan

Minister of Tribal Affairs
- In office 30 May 2019 – 11 June 2024
- Prime Minister: Narendra Modi
- Preceded by: Jual Oram
- Succeeded by: Jual Oram

2nd Chief Minister of Jharkhand
- In office 11 September 2010 – 8 January 2013
- Preceded by: Shibu Soren
- Succeeded by: Hemant Soren
- In office 12 March 2005 – 14 September 2006
- Preceded by: Shibu Soren
- Succeeded by: Madhu Koda
- In office 18 March 2003 – 2 March 2005
- Preceded by: Babulal Marandi
- Succeeded by: Shibu Soren

Member of Parliament, Lok Sabha
- In office 23 May 2019 – 5 June 2024
- Preceded by: Karia Munda
- Succeeded by: Kali Charan Munda
- Constituency: Khunti

President, Archery Association of India
- Incumbent
- Assumed office 30 May 2019
- Preceded by: Vijay Kumar Malhotra

Member of Jharkhand Legislative Assembly for Kharsawan Constituency
- In office 2011 - 2014
- Preceded by: Mangal Singh Soy
- Succeeded by: Dashrath Gagrai
- In office 15 November 2000 — 23 December 2009
- Preceded by: office established
- Succeeded by: Mangal Singh Soy

Member of Bihar Legislative Assembly
- In office 1995 — 15 November 2000
- Succeeded by: office abolished
- Constituency: Kharsawan

Personal details
- Born: 3 May 1968 (age 58) Krangajhar, Jamshedpur, Bihar (now Jharkhand), India
- Party: Bharatiya Janata Party (2000–present); Jharkhand Mukti Morcha (1980–2000)
- Spouse: Meera Munda
- Children: 3
- Website: arjunmunda.in

Arjun Munda (born 3 May 1968; Hindi pronunciation: [əɾd͡ʒʊn̪ mʊɳɖaː]) is an Indian politician. He is a member of the Bharatiya Janata Party, a former Chief Minister of the Indian state of Jharkhand and the former Minister of Tribal Affairs and Minister of Agriculture and Farmers' Welfare in the Second Modi ministry. He has also served as a member of parliament, having been elected to the 15th Lok Sabha from the Jamshedpur constituency in the 2009 parliamentary elections. The BJP has appointed him as one of the general secretary of the party.

He lost his seat to Dashrath Gagrai of Jharkhand Mukti Morcha by 11,966 votes in Kharasawan in a 2014 state assembly election.

== Early life ==
Arjun Munda was born on 3 May 1968 in Khrangajhar, Jamshedpur to Ganesh and Saira Munda. After completing high school education in the Jamshedpur area, he graduated from Ranchi University and went on to earn a PG Diploma in Social Sciences from Indira Gandhi National Open University.

== Political career ==
Munda began his political career in his teens during early 1980s when he joined the Jharkhand movement spearheaded by Jharkhand Mukti Morcha (JMM) which sought to create a separate state for tribals from the southern regions of Bihar. A believer in the welfare of indigenous people of his region, Munda felt passionate about the issue and took an active part in the movement. Soon his political influence grew due to his inclusive philosophy and he was elected to the Bihar Legislative Assembly from Kharsawan constituency in 1995 on a JMM ticket.

The National Democratic Alliance (NDA) strongly espoused the cause of Jharkhand and ran on a promise to create the state. Munda was attracted to the aspects of selfless nation building and sacrifice in the ideology of the Bharatiya Janata Party (BJP). He believed in its policy of championing the cause of Jharkhand and joined the BJP. He was elected again to the Bihar Assembly in 2000 elections on a BJP ticket from his old constituency of Kharsawan. After Jharkhand's formation, he was elected to the Jharkhand Assembly from the same constituency in 2005 and again in the 2011 by-election after assuming responsibility as the Chief Minister in September 2010.

When the NDA government came to power in 1999 under the leadership of Atal Bihari Vajpayee, it kept its promise and created Jharkhand along with Uttarakhand and Chhattisgarh. Munda became the Tribal Welfare Minister in the 1st Babulal Marandi-led NDA coalition government of Jharkhand, which was carved out from Bihar on 15 November 2000. As welfare minister, he crafted many policies and programs to ameliorate a lot of the poor and downtrodden. His vision, his work ethic, and his performance matrix soon catapulted him to the top leadership grade and his popularity and support base soared meteorically. His inclusive philosophy and his commitment to Jharkhand's high growth and development made him chief minister in 2003 at the young age of 35 when he was chosen as the consensus candidate to lead the state in the aftermath of Babulal Marandi's divisive domicile policy. He sworn as mla after vacated his seat

He took the oath as union minister in Narendra Modi's second cabinet on 30 May 2019 and became the Minister of Tribal Affairs.

Electoral history of Munda
Year	House	Constituency	Party	Votes	%	Result
2024	Lok Sabha	Khunti	BJP	361,972	38.64	Lost
2019	Lok Sabha	Khunti	BJP	382,638	45.97	Won
2009	Lok Sabha	Jamshedpur	BJP	319,620	45.30	Won
2014	Jharkhand Legislative Assembly	Kharsawan	BJP	60,036	40.98	Lost
2011^	Jharkhand Legislative Assembly	Kharsawan	BJP	61,801	55.34	Won
2005	Jharkhand Legislative Assembly	Kharsawan	BJP	74,797	68.43	Won
2000	Jharkhand Legislative Assembly	Kharsawan	BJP	44,521	50.78	Won
1995	Bihar Legislative Assembly	Kharsawan	JMM	27,164	34.50	Won

^by-election

== Major achievements ==
Arjun Munda defused the tension that was created due to the "Domicile movement" in 2001–2002 and insisted that every citizen of India had the fundamental right granted by the Indian Constitution to live and work in any part of the country.

During his tenure, Jharkhand got the 1st Lokayukta and the State successfully conducted the 34th National Games in 2011.

A 32-year-long jinx was broken when Jharkhand scripted history by conducting panchayat elections and empowered PRIs for participatory governance.

His government introduced an e-tender system in government contracts to bring transparency and efficiency and to provide equal opportunity in the procurement process.

He also took initiatives for setting up of new power plants with a view to making Jharkhand a power surplus state.

He introduced some of the famous welfare schemes and programs that were later emulated by other Indian states, such as:

- Kanyadan Yojana: To provide assistance in solemnising marriages of girls from underprivileged classes.
- Mukhya Mantri Ladli Laxmi Yojana: To promote welfare of girls born to a BPL family and APL families having an annual income of less than Rs. 72,000, her education and safe motherhood.
- Aapka-cm: The Grievance Management System was established to enable people to communicate directly with their CM and voice their grievances to the State leadership for prompt consideration and redressal.
- Mukhya Mantri Dal Bhat Yojna: To provide wholesome food and nutrition to the poorest sections of society. Under this scheme, BPL families get dal, bhat and sabji for Rs 5 at railway stations, bus stands, hospitals and public places.
- Free Laptop/Tablet: To prepare the youth to face challenges of the 21st century, tablets were to be given to students passing matriculation examinations under Yuwa Kaushal Vikas Scheme launched in 2013.

== Personal life ==
An avid golfer, Munda is also interested in promoting archery at national and international levels. He plays flute and almost all tribal musical instruments widely used in the area. He has 3 sons.

Munda is a multi-linguist who speaks English, Hindi, Bengali, Odia, Santhali, Mundari, Ho, Oraon.

Lok Sabha
Preceded by Kariya Munda	Member of Parliament for Khunti; 2019 – Present	Succeeded by Incumbent
Political offices
Preceded by Babulal Marandi	Chief Minister of Jharkhand; 18 March 2003 – 2 March 2005	Succeeded by Shibu Soren
Preceded by Shibu Soren	Chief Minister of Jharkhand; 12 March 2005 – 8 September 2006	Succeeded by Madhu Koda
Preceded by President's rule	Chief Minister of Jharkhand; 11 September 2010 – 8 January 2013	Succeeded by President's rule
Preceded by Jual Oram	Minister of Tribal Affairs; 30 May 2019 – Present	Succeeded by Incumbent
Preceded by Narendra Singh Tomar	Minister of Agriculture and Farmers' Welfare; 7 December 2023 – 9 June 2024	Succeeded by Shivraj Singh Chouhan
