= Narayanpur =

Narayanpur or Narayanapur may refer to:

== India ==
=== Bihar ===
- Narayanpur, Bhagalpur district
- Narayanpur, Bhojpur district
- Narayanpur, Darbhanga district
- Narayanpur, Jagdishpur district
- Narayanpur, Saran district
  - Narayanpur, Manjhi block
  - Narayanpur (234040), Parsa block
  - Narayanpur, Taraiya block

=== Uttar Pradesh ===
- Narayanpur, Dih, Raebareli, Uttar Pradesh
- Narayanpur, Maharajganj, Raebareli, Uttar Pradesh
- Narayanpur, Shivgarh, Uttar Pradesh
- Narayanpur, Unchahar, Uttar Pradesh

=== Other states ===
- Narayanpur, Assam
- Narayanpur, Chhattisgarh
  - Narayanpur district, Chhattisgarh
- Narayanpur, Kashmir, Jammu district, Jammu & Kashmir
- Narayanpur, Jamtara district, Jharkhand
  - Narayanpur block, an administrative division in Jamtara district, Jharkhand
- Narayanpur, Karnataka
- Narayanapur, Bidar, Bidar district, Karnataka
- Narayanpur, Pune, Maharashtra
- Narayanapur, Nalgonda, Bhuvanagiri district, Telangana
- Narayanapur, Ranga Reddy, Telangana
- Narayanpur, Kolkata, West Bengal
- Narayanpur, Namkhana, South 24 Parganas district, West Bengal
- Narayanpur, Purba Bardhaman, West Bengal

== Nepal ==
- Narayanpur, Sarlahi, Janakpur
- Narayanpur, Chitwan, Narayani
- Narayanpur, Rapti, Lumbini Province
- Narayanpur, Kailali, Sudurpashchim Pradesh

== Other uses ==
- Narayanpur (Vidhan Sabha constituency), a legislative assembly constituency of Chhattisgarh state in India
- Basava Sagara, previously known as Narayanpur Dam, across the Krishna River in Karnataka State, India

== See also ==
- Narainpur (disambiguation)
- Narayanpur Bad, Uttar Pradesh, India
- Narayanapura, Karnataka, India
- Narayanapuram (disambiguation)
