= Jamtara (disambiguation) =

Jamtara is a city and a notified area in Jamtara district in the Indian state of Jharkhand.

Jamtara may also refer to:

- Jamtara district, one of the 24 districts of Jharkhand, India; centered on the city
  - Jamtara Sadar subdivision, in Jamtara district, Jharkhand, India
    - Jamtara block, a community development block in Jamtara district, Jharkhand, India
  - Jamtara (Vidhan Sabha constituency), Jharkhand Legislative Assembly
  - Jamtara College, undergraduate college in the city of Jamtara, Jharkhand, India
  - Jamtara – Sabka Number Ayega, an Indian crime drama web television series set in the city of Jamtara
- Jamtara, Bardhaman, in West Bengal state, India
- Jamtara, Giridih, a census town in Giriidh district, Jharkhand, India
