= Karmatanr (community development block) =

Karmatar Karmatar Vidyasagar
- Community development block
- Coordinates: 24°5′2″N 86°42′8″E
- Country: India
- State: Jharkhand
- District: Jamtara

Government
  - Type: Federal democracy

Area
  - Total: 175.00 km^{2} (67.57 sq mi)
- Elevation: 201 m (659 ft)

Population (2011)
  - Total: 115,266
  - Density: 658.66/km^{2} (1,705.9/sq mi)

Languages
  - Official: Hindi, Urdu

Literacy (2011)
  - Total literates: 53,844 (58.16%)
- Time zone: UTC+5:30 (IST)
- PIN: 815352 (Karmatar)
- Telephone/STD code: 06433
- Vehicle registration: JH-21
- Lok Sabha constituency: Dumka
- Vidhan Sabha constituency: Jamtara and Sarath
- Website: jamtara.nic.in

Karmatar is a community development block that forms an administrative division in the Jamtara Sadar subdivision of the Jamtara district, Jharkhand state, India. It is located 15 km from Jamtara, the district headquarter.

== History ==
Ishwar Chandra Vidyasagar, the scholar-social reformer and a key figure in the Bengal Renaissance, came to Karmatar in 1873 and spent more than 18 years of his life here. In 1974, the railway station at Karmatar was renamed Vidyasagar.

== Geography ==
Karmatar is located at 24°5′2″N 86°42′8″E.

Jamtara district in the south-eastern part of Santhal Parganas is a rolling upland tract. The Barakar separates it from the Chota Nagpur Plateau and the Ajay, flows in from Deoghar district in the west, drains the district, forms the border between Jharkhand and West Bengal for some distance and flows into West Bengal in the east.

Karmatanr CD block is bounded by Margomunda, Karon and Sarath CD blocks in Deoghar district on the north, Jamtara CD block on the east, and Narayanpur CD block on the south and west.

Karmatanr CD block has an area of 175.00 km^{2}.Karmatanr police station serves this block. Headquarters of this CD block is at Karmatanr.

Karmatar CD block has 18 panchayats and 151 villages.

Panchayats of Karmatar CD block are: Alagchuan, Bagber, Baradaha, Barmundi, Birajpur, Dumariya, Karmatanr, Kuruwa, Mattanr, Mohanpur, Nawadih, Phofnad, Sikarposni, Sitakatta, Subdidih, Tarabahal, Tarkojori and Tetulbandha.

== Demographics ==
=== Population ===
As per the 2011 Census of India Karmatanr CD block had a total population of 115,266, of which 109,398 were rural and 5,868 were urban. There were 58,937 (51%) males and 56,329 (49%) females. Population below 6 years was 22,693. Scheduled Castes numbered 7,737 (6.71%) and Scheduled Tribes numbered 21,767 (18.88%).

Census town in Karmatanr CD block is (2011 census figure in brackets): Karmatanr (5,868).

Large village (with 4,000+ population) in Karmatanr CD block is (2011 census figure in brackets): Karua (4,031).

=== Literacy ===
As of 2011 census, CD block Wise Primary Census Abstract Data the total number of literates in Karmatar Vidyasagar CD Block was 53,844 (58.16% of the population over 6 years) out of which 33,798 (63%) were males and 20,046 (37%) were females. The gender disparity (the difference between female and male literacy rates) was 26%.

See also – List of Jharkhand districts ranked by literacy rate

Literacy in CD Blocks of
Jamtara district
Narayanpur – 55.72%
Karmatanr – 58.16%
Jamtara – 66.31%
Nala – 64.63%
Fatehpur – 65.66%
Kundhit – 63.64%
Source: 2011 Census: CD Block Wise
Primary Census Abstract Data

=== Language and religion ===
Religions in Karmatand block (2011)
Religion	Percent
Hinduism	48.97%
Islam	42.81%
Sarna	7.54%
Christianity	0.60%
Other or not stated	0.08%

Languages of Karmatand block (2011)
1. Khortha (67.1%)
2. Santali (18.3%)
3. Urdu (8.32%)
4. Bengali (3.63%)
5. Hindi (1.77%)
6. Others (0.93%)

At the time of the 2011 census, 67.09% of the population spoke Khortha, 18.26% Santali, 8.32% Urdu, 3.63% Bengali and 1.77% Hindi as their first language.

== Rural poverty ==
60-70% of the population of Jamtara district were in the BPL category in 2004–2005, being in the same category as Ranchi and Dumka districts. Rural poverty in Jharkhand declined from 66% in 1993–94 to 46% in 2004–05. In 2011, it has come down to 39.1%.

== Economy ==
=== Livelihood ===
Livelihood
in Karmatanr CD block
1. Cultivators (29.6%)
2. Agricultural labourers (51.3%)
3. Household industries (1.79%)
4. Other Workers (17.3%)

In Karmatanr CD block in 2011, amongst the class of total workers, cultivators numbered 13,727 and formed 29.62%, agricultural labourers numbered 23,787 and formed 51.33%, household industry workers numbered 828 and formed 1.79% and other workers numbered 7,998 and formed 17.26%. Total workers numbered 48,098 and formed 41.73% of the total population. Non-workers numbered 67,168 and formed 58.27% of total population.

Note: In the census records a person is considered a cultivator, if the person is engaged in cultivation/ supervision of land owned. When a person who works on another person's land for wages in cash or kind or share, is regarded as an agricultural labourer. Household industry is defined as an industry conducted by one or more members of the family within the household or village, and one that does not qualify for registration as a factory under the Factories Act. Other workers are persons engaged in some economic activity other than cultivators, agricultural labourers and household workers. It includes factory, mining, plantation, transport and office workers, those engaged in business and commerce, teachers and entertainment artistes.

=== Infrastructure ===
There are 145 inhabited villages in Karmatanr CD block. In 2011, 114 villages had power supply. 142 villages had well water (covered/ uncovered), 139 villages had hand pumps, and all villages had drinking water facility. 7 villages had post offices, 7 villages had sub post offices, 5 villages had telephones (land lines), 4 villages had public call offices and 105 villages had mobile phone coverage. 144 villages had pucca (paved) village roads, 6 villages had bus service (public/ private), 2 villages had railway stations, 1 village had autos/ modified autos, and 24 villages had tractors. 5 villages had bank branches, 1 village had agricultural credit societies, 2 villages had cinema/ video halls, 33 villages had public distribution system, 21 villages had weekly haat (market) and 66 villages had assembly polling stations.

=== Backward Regions Grant Fund ===
Jamtara district is listed as a backward region and receives financial support from the Backward Regions Grant Fund. The fund created by the Government of India is designed to redress regional imbalances in development. As of 2012, 272 districts across the country were listed under this scheme. The list includes 21 districts of Jharkhand.

== Transportation ==
The Ranigunj-Kiul section of the Howrah-Delhi main line was in position in 1871. It provided rail link for Karmatar.

== Education ==
Karmatanr CD block had 24 villages with pre-primary schools, 119 villages with primary schools, 51 villages with middle schools, 4 villages with secondary schools, 2 villages with senior secondary schools, 26 villages with no educational facility.
.*Senior secondary schools are also known as Inter colleges in Jharkhand

== Healthcare ==
Karmatanr CD block had 2 villages with primary health centres, 8 villages with primary health subcentres, 7 villages with maternity and child welfare centres, 1 village with veterinary hospital, 2 villages with family welfare centres, 16 villages with medicine shops.
.*Private medical practitioners, alternative medicine etc. not included
