= Fatehpur (community development block) =

- Community development block
- Coordinates: 24°6′56″N 86°59′51″E
- Country: India
- State: Jharkhand
- District: Jamtara

Government
  - Type: Federal democracy

Area
  - Total: 280.44 km^{2} (108.28 sq mi)
- Elevation: 201 m (659 ft)

Population (2011)
  - Total: 89,645
  - Density: 319.66/km^{2} (827.91/sq mi)

Languages
  - Official: Hindi, Urdu

Literacy (2011)
  - Total literates: 49,661 (65.66%)
- Time zone: UTC+5:30 (IST)
- Vehicle registration: JH-21
- Lok Sabha constituency: Dumka
- Vidhan Sabha constituency: Nala
- Website: jamtara.nic.in

Fatehpur is a community development block that forms an administrative division in the Jamtara Sadar subdivision of the Jamtara district, Jharkhand state, India. It is located 27 km from Jamtara, the district headquarters.

== Geography ==
Fatehpur is located at 24°6′56″N 86°59′51″E.

Jamtara district in the south-eastern part of Santhal Parganas is a rolling upland tract. The Barakar separates it from the Chota Nagpur Plateau and the Ajay, flows in from Deoghar district in the west, drains the district, forms the border between Jharkhand and West Bengal for some distance and flows into West Bengal in the east.

Fatehpur CD block is bounded by Sarath and Palojori CD blocks in Deoghar district and Masalia CD block in Dumka district on the north, Kundhit on the east, Nala CD block on the south and Jamtara CD block on the west.

Fatehpur CD block has an area of 280.44 km^{2}.Fatehpur and Bindapathar police stations serve this block. Headquarters of this CD block is at Fatehpur village.

Fatehpur CD block has 15 panchayats and 179 villages.

Panchayats of Fatehpur CD block are: Agaiyasarmundi, Asanberia, Bamandiha, Bandarnacha, Banudih, Bindapathar, Chapuriya, Dhasaniya, Dumaria, Fatehpur, Jamjori, Khamarbad, Palajori, Simaldubi and Simladangal.

== Demographics ==
=== Population ===
As per the 2011 Census of India Fatehpur CD block had a total population of 89,645, all of which were rural. There were 45,546 (51%) males and 44,099 (49%) females. Population below 6 years was 14,008. Scheduled Castes numbered 6,920 (7.72%) and Scheduled Tribes numbered 42,090 (46.95%).

Large village (with 4,000+ population) in Fatehpur CD block is (2011 census figure in brackets): Fatehpur (4,107).

=== Literacy ===
As of 2011 census, the total number of literates in Fatehpur CD Block was 49,661 (65.66% of the population over 6 years) out of which 30,381 (61%) were males and 19,280 (39%) were females. The gender disparity (the difference between female and male literacy rates) was 22%.

See also – List of Jharkhand districts ranked by literacy rate

Literacy in CD Blocks of
Jamtara district
Narayanpur – 55.72%
Karmatanr – 58.16%
Jamtara – 66.31%
Nala – 64.63%
Fatehpur – 65.66%
Kundhit – 63.64%
Source: 2011 Census: CD Block Wise
Primary Census Abstract Data

=== Language and religion ===
Religions in Fatehpur block (2011)
| Religion | Percent |
| Hinduism | 82.02% |
| Sarna | 11.15% |
| Islam | 5.63% |
| Christianity | 1.05% |
| Other or not stated | 0.15% |

Languages of Fatehpur block (2011)
1. Santali (44.1%)
2. Bengali (36.5%)
3. Khortha (12.9%)
4. Malto (1.65%)
5. Hindi (1.61%)
6. Kol (1.51%)
7. Magahi (1.21%)
8. Others (0.49%)

At the time of the 2011 census, 44.06% of the population spoke Santali, 36.54% Bengali, 12.93% Khortha, 1.65% Malto, 1.61% Hindi, 1.51% Kol and 1.21% Magahi as their first language.

== Rural poverty ==
60-70% of the population of Jamtara district were in the BPL category in 2004–2005, being in the same category as Ranchi and Dumka districts. Rural poverty in Jharkhand declined from 66% in 1993–94 to 46% in 2004–05. In 2011, it has come down to 39.1%.

== Economy ==
=== Livelihood ===
Livelihood
in Fatehpur CD block
1. Cultivators (50.1%)
2. Agricultural labourers (34.4%)
3. Household industries (3.73%)
4. Other Workers (11.8%)

In Fatehpur CD block in 2011, amongst the class of total workers, cultivators numbered 22,309 and formed 50.06%, agricultural labourers numbered 15,349 and formed 34.44%, household industry workers numbered 1,663 and formed 3.73% and other workers numbered 5,242 and formed 11.76%. Total workers numbered 44,563 and formed 49.71% of the total population. Non-workers numbered 45,082 and formed 50.29% of total population.

Note: In the census records a person is considered a cultivator, if the person is engaged in cultivation/ supervision of land owned. When a person who works on another person's land for wages in cash or kind or share, is regarded as an agricultural labourer. Household industry is defined as an industry conducted by one or more members of the family within the household or village, and one that does not qualify for registration as a factory under the Factories Act. Other workers are persons engaged in some economic activity other than cultivators, agricultural labourers and household workers. It includes factory, mining, plantation, transport and office workers, those engaged in business and commerce, teachers and entertainment artistes.

=== Infrastructure ===
There are 168 inhabited villages in Fatehpur CD block. In 2011, 116 villages had power supply. 48 villages had tap water (treated/ untreated), 162 villages had well water (covered/ uncovered), 165 villages had hand pumps, and all villages had drinking water facility. 15 villages had post offices, 9 villages had sub post offices, 2 villages had telephones (land lines), 9 villages had public call offices and 115 villages had mobile phone coverage. 168 villages had pucca (paved) village roads, 25 villages had bus service (public/ private), 1 village had railway station, 2 villages had autos/ modified autos, and 50 villages had tractors. 10 villages had bank branches, 43 villages had agricultural credit societies, 2 villages had cinema/ video halls, 5 villages had public library and public reading rooms. 62 villages had public distribution system, 19 villages had weekly haat (market) and 88 villages had assembly polling stations.

=== Backward Regions Grant Fund ===
Jamtara district is listed as a backward region and receives financial support from the Backward Regions Grant Fund. The fund created by the Government of India is designed to redress regional imbalances in development. As of 2012, 272 districts across the country were listed under this scheme. The list includes 21 districts of Jharkhand.

== Transportation ==
Chittaranjan railway station on the Howrah-Delhi main line is 18 km from Fatehpur. The Ajay forms the border between Jamtara district of Jharkhand and Bardhaman district of West Bengal. There is a narrow bridge for use by pedestrians and two wheelers, across the Ajay near Chittaranjan (Simjuri).

== Education ==
Fatehpur CD block had 37 villages with pre-primary schools, 168 villages with primary schools, 64 villages with middle schools, 7 villages with secondary schools, 1 village with senior secondary school, 23 villages with no educational facility.
.*Senior secondary schools and Inter Colleges both offers 11th and 12th standard education in Jharkhand

== Healthcare ==
Fatehpur CD block had 1 village with community health centre, 3 villages with primary health centres, 11 villages with primary health subcentres, 1 village with maternity and child welfare centre, 2 villages with medicine shops.
.*Private medical practitioners, alternative medicine etc. not included
