= Bindapathar =

- Village
- Location in Jharkhand, India Bindapathar (India)
- Coordinates: 24.0001°N 86.9275°E
- Country: India
- State: Jharkhand
- District: Jamtara

Population (2011)
  - Total: 2,156

Languages (*For language details see Fatehpur (community development block)#Language and religion)
  - Official: Bengali, Hindi, Santhali
- Time zone: UTC+5:30 (IST)
- PIN: 815351
- Telephone/ STD code: 06433
- Lok Sabha constituency: Dumka
- Vidhan Sabha constituency: Nala
- Website: jamtara.nic.in

Bindapathar is a village in the Fatehpur CD block in the Jamtara Sadar subdivision of the Jamtara district in the state of Jharkhand in eastern India.

== Geography ==
Cities, towns and locations in the Deoghar, Dumka and Jamtara districts in Santhal Pargana Division
M: Municipality, CT: census town, R: Rural/ Urban centre, D: Dam,
Owing to space constraints in the small map, the actual locations in a larger map may vary slightly

=== Location ===
Bindapathar is located at 24.0001°N 86.9975°E.

=== Overview ===
The map shows a large area, which is a plateau with low hills, except in the eastern portion where the Rajmahal hills intrude into this area and the Ramgarh hills are there. The south-western portion is just a rolling upland. The area is overwhelmingly rural with only small pockets of urbanisation.

Note: The full screen map is interesting. All places marked on the map are linked in the full screen map and one can easily move on to another page of his/her choice. Enlarge the full screen map to see what else is there – one gets railway connections, many more road connections and so on.

=== Area ===
Bindapathar has an area of 600.68 hectares (1,484.3 acres).

== Demographics ==
According to the 2011 Census of India, Bindapathar had a total population of 2,156, of which 1,107 (51%) were males and 1,049 (49%) were females. Population in the age range 0–6 years was 279. The total number of literate persons in Bindapathar was 1,877 (68.73% of the population over 6 years).

== Civic administration ==
=== Police station ===
There is a police station at Bindapathar.

== Education ==
Rajkiyakrit Utkramait High School Bindapathar is a Hindi-medium coeducational institution established in 1954. It has facilities for teaching from class I to class X.
