= Bagdahari =

Bagdahari Bagdehri
- Village
- Location in Jharkhand, India Bagdahari (India)
- Coordinates: 23.886345°N 87.231647°E
- Country: India
- State: Jharkhand
- District: Jamtara

Population (2011)
  - Total: 2,451

Languages (*For language details see Kundhit block#Language and religion)
  - Official: Hindi, Santali language
- Time zone: UTC+5:30 (IST)
- PIN: 815359
- Telephone/ STD code: 06433
- Lok Sabha constituency: Dumka
- Vidhan Sabha constituency: Nala
- Website: jamtara.nic.in

Bagdahari (also known as Bagdehri) is a village in Kundhit CD block in the Jamtara Sadar subdivision of the Jamtara district in the Indian state of Jharkhand.

== Geography ==
Cities, towns and locations in the Deoghar, Dumka and Jamtara districts in Santhal Pargana Division
M: Municipality, CT: census town, R: Rural/ Urban centre, D: Dam,
Owing to space constraints in the small map, the actual locations in a larger map may vary slightly

=== Location ===
Bagdahari is located at 23.886345°N 87.231647°E.

=== Overview ===
The map shows a large area, which is a plateau with low hills, except in the eastern portion where the Rajmahal hills intrude into this area and the Ramgarh hills are there. The south-western portion is just a rolling upland. The area is overwhelmingly rural with only small pockets of urbanisation.

Note: The full screen map is interesting. All places marked on the map are linked in the full screen map and one can easily move on to another page of his/her choice. Enlarge the full screen map to see what else is there – one gets railway connections, many more road connections and so on.

=== Area ===
Bagdahari has an area of 622 hectares (1,540 acres).

== Demographics ==
According to the 2011 Census of India, Bagdahari had a population of 2,451, of which 1,257 (51%) were males and 1,194 (49%) were females. Population in the age range 0–6 years was 296. The total number of literate persons in Bagdahari was 2,155 (73.32% of the population over 6 years).

== Civic administration ==
=== Police station ===
There is a police station at Bagdehri.

== Education ==
Rajkiyakrit High School Bagdahari is a Hindi-medium coeducational institution established in 1954. It has facilities for teaching in classes IX and X.
