= Fatehpur, Jamtara =

Fatehpur
- Village
- Location in Jharkhand, India Fatehpur (India)
- Coordinates: 24.1155°N 86.9975°E
- Country: India
- State: Jharkhand
- District: Jamtara

Population (2011)
  - Total: 4,107

Languages (*For language details see Fatehpur (community development block)#Language and religion)
  - Official: Hindi, Urdu
- Time zone: UTC+5:30 (IST)
- PIN: 814166
- Telephone/ STD code: 06433
- Lok Sabha constituency: Dumka
- Vidhan Sabha constituency: Nala
- Website: jamtara.nic.in

Fatehpur is a village in Fatehpur CD block in the Jamtara Sadar subdivision of the Jamtara district in the Indian state of Jharkhand.

== Geography ==
Cities, towns and locations in the Deoghar, Dumka and Jamtara districts in Santhal Pargana Division
M: Municipality, CT: census town, R: Rural/ Urban centre, D: Dam,
Owing to space constraints in the small map, the actual locations in a larger map may vary slightly

=== Location ===
Fatehpur is located at 24.1155°N 86.9975°E.

=== Overview ===
The map shows a large area, which is a plateau with low hills, except in the eastern portion where the Rajmahal hills intrude into this area and the Ramgarh hills are there. The south-western portion is just a rolling upland. The entire area is overwhelmingly rural with only small pockets of urbanisation.

Note: The full screen map is interesting. All places marked on the map are linked in the full screen map and one can easily move on to another page of his/her choice. Enlarge the full screen map to see what else is there – one gets railway connections, many more road connections and so on.

=== Area ===
Fatehpur has an area of 448.69 hectares (1,108.7 acres).

== Demographics ==
According to the 2011 Census of India, Fatehpur had a total population of 4,107, of which 2,111 (51%) were males and 1,996 (49%) were females. Population in the age range 0–6 years was 606. The total number of literate persons in Fatehpur was 3,501 (73.61% of the population over 6 years).

== Civic administration ==
=== Police station ===
There is a police station at Fatehpur.

=== CD block HQ ===
Headquarters of Fatehpur CD block is at Fatehpur village.

== Education ==
Government High School Fatehpur is a Hindi medium coeducational institution established in 1954. It has facilities for teaching in classes IX and X.

Saraswati Shishu Vidya Mandir is a coeducational institution established on 11 February 1990. It has facilities for teaching from class Shishu Pravesh to class 10th.
