= Kundahit =

- Village
- Location in Jharkhand, India Kundahit (India)
- Coordinates: 23.976345°N 87.158647°E
- Country: India
- State: Jharkhand
- District: Jamtara

Population (2011)
  - Total: 4,107

Languages (*For language details see Kundhit block#Language and religion)
  - Official: Hindi, Urdu
- Time zone: UTC+5:30 (IST)
- PIN: 815359
- Telephone/ STD code: 06433
- Lok Sabha constituency: Dumka
- Vidhan Sabha constituency: Nala
- Website: jamtara.nic.in

Kundahit is a village in Kundhit CD block in the Jamtara Sadar subdivision of the Jamtara district in the Indian state of Jharkhand.

== Geography ==
Cities, towns and locations in the Deoghar, Dumka and Jamtara districts in Santhal Pargana Division
M: Municipality, CT: census town, R: Rural/ Urban centre, D: Dam,
Owing to space constraints in the small map, the actual locations in a larger map may vary slightly

=== Location ===
Kundahit is located at 23.976345°N 87.158647°E.

=== Overview ===
The map shows a large area, which is a plateau with low hills, except in the eastern portion where the Rajmahal hills intrude into this area and the Ramgarh hills are there. The south-western portion is just a rolling upland. The entire area is overwhelmingly rural with only small pockets of urbanisation.

Note: The full screen map is interesting. All places marked on the map are linked in the full screen map and one can easily move on to another page of his/her choice. Enlarge the full screen map to see what else is there – one gets railway connections, many more road connections and so on.

=== Area ===
Kundahit has an area of 285.38 hectares (705.2 acres).

== Demographics ==
According to the 2011 Census of India, Kundahit had a total population of 2,760, of which 1,383 (50%) were males and 1,377 (50%) were females. Population in the age range 0–6 years was 322. The total number of literate persons in Kundahit was 2,438 (76.54% of the population over 6 years).

== Civic administration ==
=== Police station ===
There is a police station at Kundahit.

=== CD block HQ ===
Headquarters of Kundhit CD block is at Kundahit village.

== Education ==
Bhagwat Jha Azad College, affiliated with Sido Kanhu Murmu University, was established in 1981 at Kundahit.

Kasturba Gandhi Balika Vidyalaya, Kundahit, is a Hindi-medium girls only institution established in 2007. It has facilities for teaching from class VI to class XII.

Raj Singh Bihani High School Kundahit is a Hindi-medium coeducational institution established in 1951. It has facilities for teaching in classes IX and XII.

Project Girls’ High School is a Hindi-medium girls only institution established in 1984. It has facilities for teaching in classes IX and X.
