= Edwards English School, Jamtara =

High school in Jharkhand, India

Edwards English School
- Jamtara, Jharkhand, India

Information
- School type: Co-education
- Motto: In God We Trust
- Founded: 1995
- Founder: Bro. A.D. Shenoy
- School board: ICSE
- Principal: Mr. Anthony Reis
- Language: English
- Houses: 4
- Colour
- Nickname: EES
- Website: www.edwardschool.co.in

Edwards English School, Jamtara (informally EES) is an English medium high school affiliated to the Indian Certificate of Secondary Education (ICSE), New Delhi. It is situated in Budhudih village of Jamtara, Jamtara District, Jharkhand. It was established in 1995 by A. D. Shenoy and George Kurien.

== School magazine ==
The Edwardian is an annual collection of school happenings. It has English and Hindi sections and contains reports, speeches, photographs, poems, articles, and case studies of the school.

== Sports ==
The sports curriculum was designed and implemented by Rishikesh Singh and Alfred Francis, who were sports teachers at the school. There are facilities for students and staff consisting of playing fields for football, basketball and a cricket ground.
