= Narayanpur, Jamtara =

Naryanpur
- Village
- Location in Jharkhand, India Naryanpur (India)
- Coordinates: 24.047778°N 86.614778°E
- Country: India
- State: Jharkhand
- District: Jamtara

Population (2011)
  - Total: 2,655

Languages (*For language details see Narayanpur block#Language and religion)
  - Official: Hindi, Urdu
- Time zone: UTC+5:30 (IST)
- PIN: 815352
- Telephone/ STD code: 06433
- Lok Sabha constituency: Dumka
- Vidhan Sabha constituency: Jamtara
- Website: jamtara.nic.in

Narayanpur (also spelled Narainpur) is a village in Narayanpur CD block in the Jamtara Sadar subdivision of the Jamtara district in the Indian state of Jharkhand.

== Geography ==
Cities, towns and locations in the Deoghar, Dumka and Jamtara districts in Santhal Pargana Division
M: Municipality, CT: census town, R: Rural/ Urban centre, D: Dam,
Owing to space constraints in the small map, the actual locations in a larger map may vary slightly

=== Location ===
Narayanpur is located at 24.247778°N 86.614778°E.

=== Overview ===
The map shows a large area, which is a plateau with low hills, except in the eastern portion where the Rajmahal hills intrude into this area and the Ramgarh hills are there. The south-western portion is just a rolling upland. The area is overwhelmingly rural with only small pockets of urbanisation.

Note: The full screen map is interesting. All places marked on the map are linked in the full screen map and one can easily move on to another page of his/her choice. Enlarge the full screen map to see what else is there – one gets railway connections, many more road connections and so on.

=== Area ===
Narayanpur has an area of 222 hectares (550 acres).

== Demographics ==
According to the 2011 Census of India, Naryanpur had a total population of 2,655, of which 1,357 (51%) were males and 1,298 (49%) were females. Population in the age range 0–6 years was 435. The total number of literate persons in Narayanpur was 2,220 (66.89% of the population over 6 years).

== Civic administration ==
=== Police station ===
There is a police station at Narayanpur.

=== CD block HQ ===
Headquarters of Narayanpur CD block is at Narayanpur village.

== Education ==
Kasturba Gandhi Balika Vidyalaya, Narayanpur, is a Hindi-medium girls only institution established in 2005. It has facilities for teaching from class VI to class XII.

Government High School Narayanpur is a Hindi-medium coeducational institution established in 1957. It has facilities for teaching from class IX to class XII.
