= Bewa =

Bewa is a village in Jamtara district of Jharkhand state of India.
