= Jamtara Sadar subdivision =

- Subdivision
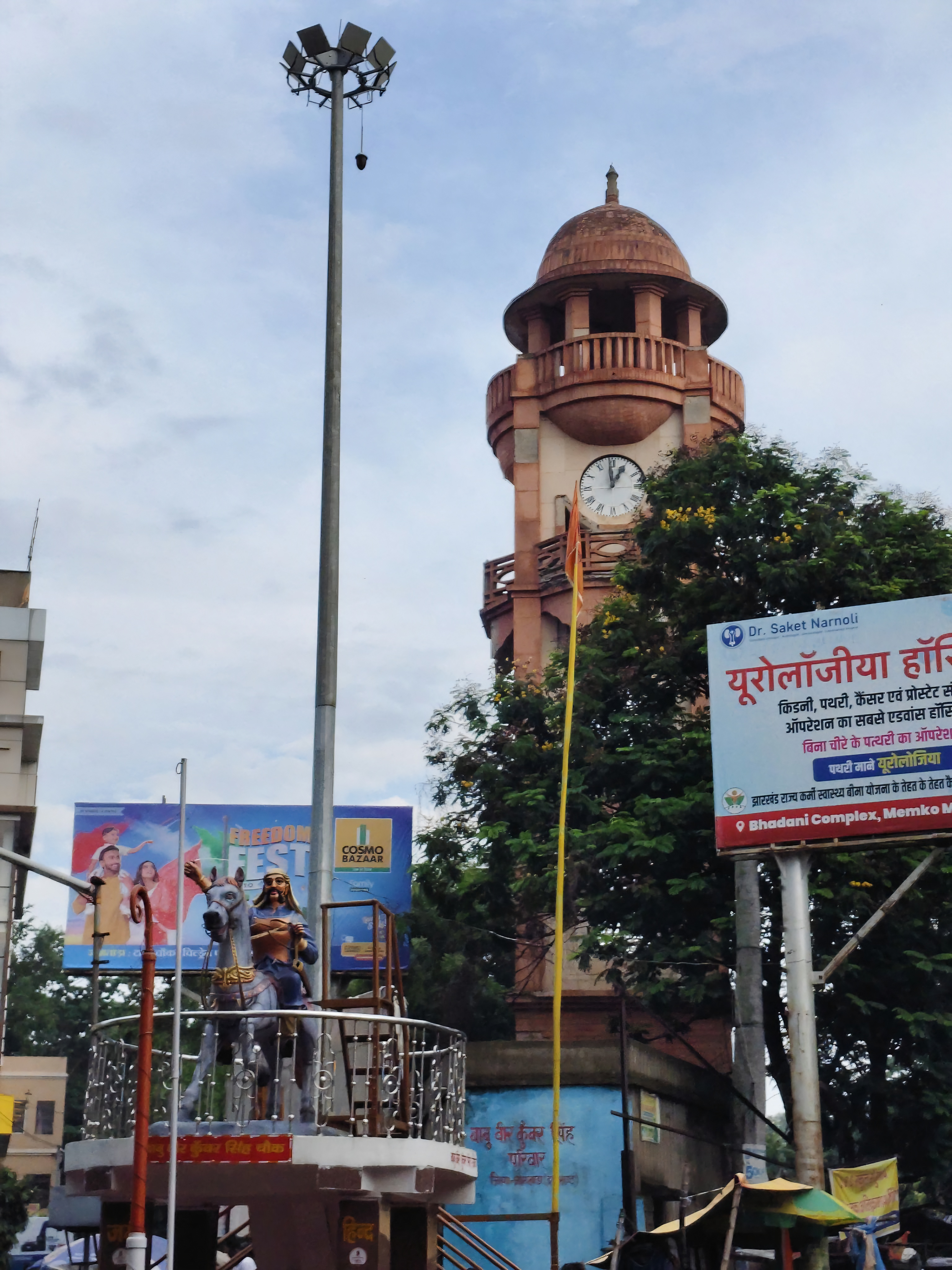
- Clock tower with statue of Veer Kunwar Singh on horseback

- Location in Jharkhand, India Jamtara Sadar subdivision (India)
- Coordinates: 23.9633°N 86.8014°E
- Country: India
- State: Jharkhand
- District: Jamtara
- Headquarters: Jamtara

Area
  - Total: 1,811 km^{2} (699 sq mi)

Population
  - Total: 791,042
  - Density: 436.8/km^{2} (1,131/sq mi)

Languages
  - Official: Hindi, Urdu
- Time zone: IST
- Website: jamtara.nic.in

Jamtara Sadar subdivision is the only administrative subdivision of the Jamtara district in the Santhal Pargana division in the state of Jharkhand, India.

== Overview ==
Jamtara Sadar subdivision in the south-eastern part of Santhal Parganas is a rolling upland tract. The Barakar separates it from the Chota Nagpur Plateau and the Ajay, flows in from Deoghar district in the west, drains the district, forms the border between Jharkhand and West Bengal for some distance and flows into West Bengal in the east.

== History ==
Jamtara subdivision was formed in 1879 as a part of Santhal Parganas district with its headquarters at Dumka. Santhal Parganas district comprised Dumka, Deoghar, Sahibganj, Godda, Pakur and Jamtara subdivisions. In 1983, Deoghar, Sahibganj and Godda subdivisions were given the status of a district, and a result Jamtara subdivision remained in Dumka district. After the formation of Jharkhand, Jamtara subdivision was made a district in 2001.

== Subdivision ==
Jamtara district has only one administrative subdivision:

Subdivision	Headquarters	Area km^{2}	Population (2011)	Rural population % (2011)	Urban population % (2011)
Jamtara Sadar	Jamtara	1,811	791,042	90.42	9.58

== Administrative units ==
Jamtara subdivision has 6 community development blocks, 1,161 total villages, 1,082 inhabited villages, 2 statutory towns and 1 census town. The statutory towns are at Jamtara and Mihijam. The census town is: Karmatanr. The subdivision has its headquarters at Jamtara.

Cities, towns and locations in the Deoghar, Dumka and Jamtara districts in Santhal Pargana Division
M: Municipality, CT: census town, R: Rural/ Urban centre, D: Dam,
Owing to space constraints in the small map, the actual locations in a larger map may vary slightly

== Demographics ==
As per the 2011 Census of India data Jamtara Sadar subdivision, in Jamtara district in 2011, had a total population of 791,042. There were 404,830 (51%) males and 386,212 (49%) females. Scheduled castes numbered 72,885 (9.21%) and scheduled tribes numbered 240,489 (30.40%). Density of population was 437 persons per square km. Literacy rate was 64.59%, male literacy rate was 76.46%, female literacy rate was 52.15%.

See also – List of Jharkhand districts ranked by literacy rate

== Police stations ==
Police stations in Jamtara Sadar subdivision were at:

1. Jamtara
2. Fatehpur
3. Karmatanr
4. Kundahit
5. Nala
6. Narayanpur
7. Mihijam
8. Bagdahari
9. Bindapathar

== Blocks ==
Community development blocks in Jamtara Sadar subdivision are:

CD Block	Headquarters	Area km^{2}	Population (2011)	SC %	ST %	Literacy rate %	NP, CT
Jamtara	Jamtara	329.73	132,600	6.92	45.25	66.30	2
Karmatanr	Karmatanr	175.00	115,266	6.71	18.88	58.16	1
Fatehpur	Fatehpur	280.44	89,645	7.72	46.95	65.66	-
Kundhit	Kundahit	295.63	84,907	15.31	29.81	64.64	-
Nala	Nala	416.67	134,780	12.40	36.08	64.63	-
Narayanpur	Narayanpur	282.80	163,966	5.79	23.47	55.72	-

== Education ==
In 2011, Jamtara Sadar subdivision out of a total 1,082 inhabited villages there were 127 villages with pre-primary schools, 917 villages with primary schools, 403 villages with middle schools, 18 villages with secondary schools, 14 villages with senior secondary schools, 2 villages with general degree colleges, 157 villages with no educational facility.
.*Senior secondary schools are also known as Inter colleges in Jharkhand

=== Institutions ===
The following institutions are located in Jamtara Sadar subdivision:

- Jamtara College was established at Jamtara in 1961.
- Jamtara Mahila Sandhya Mahavidyalaya was established at Jamtara in 1994. It has hostel facilities for 100 scheduled tribe students.
- JJS Degree College was established at Mihijam in 1983.
- Bhagwat Jha Azad College was established at Kundahit in 1981.
- Degree College was established at Nala in 1988.

== Healthcare ==
In 2011, Jamtara Sadar subdivision there were 3 villages with community health centres, 23 villages with primary health centres, 93 villages with primary health subcentres, 53 villages with maternity and child welfare centres, 6 villages with allopathic hospitals, 35 villages with dispensaries, 8 villages with veterinary hospitals, 33 villages with family welfare centres, 141 villages with medicine shops.
.*Private medical practitioners, alternative medicine etc. not included

=== Medical facilities ===
(Anybody having referenced information about location of government/ private medical facilities may please add it here)
