= Vidyasagar railway station =

Railway station in Jharkhand, India

VIDYASAGAR

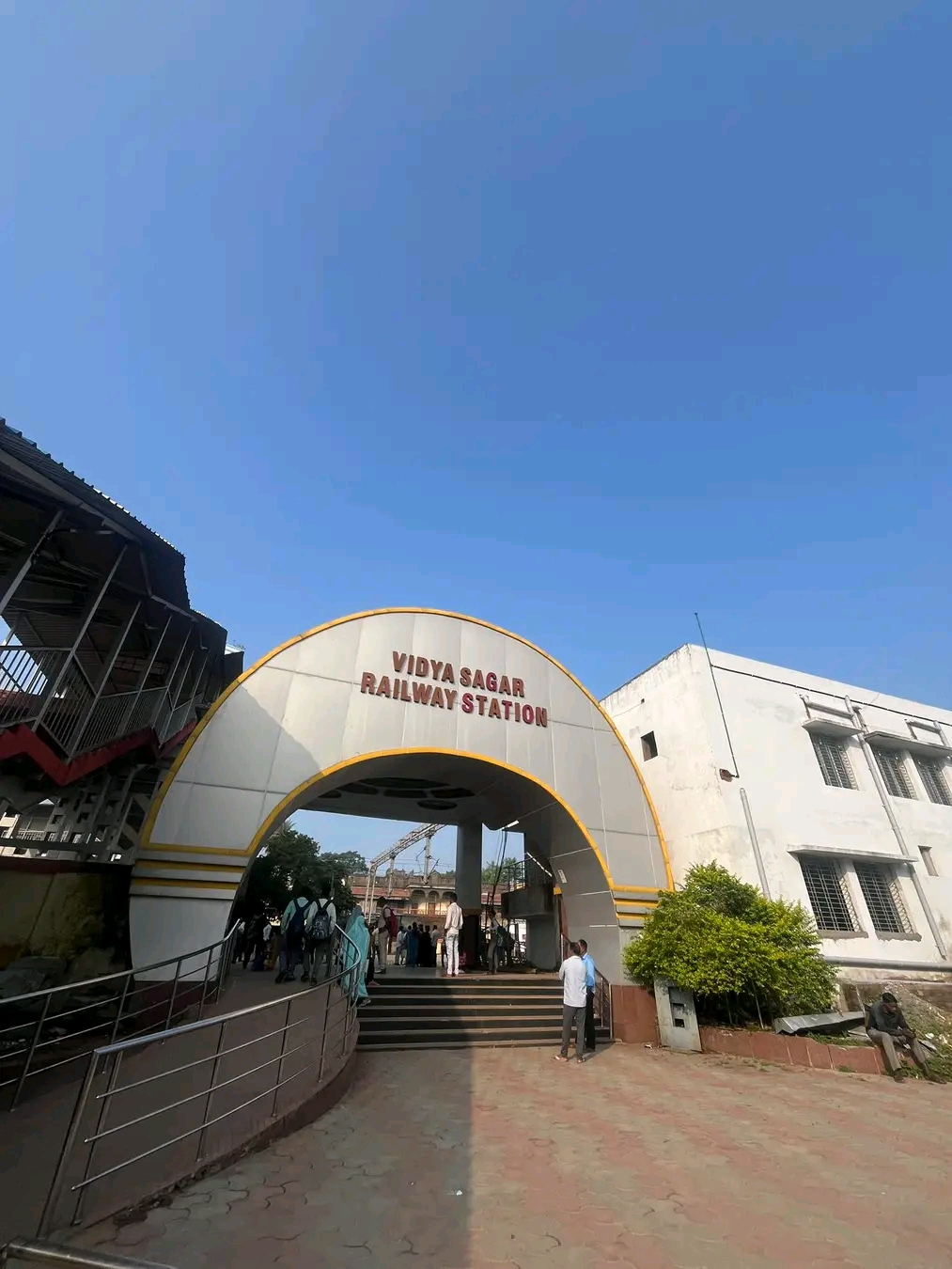
- Entrance view of Vidyasagar railway station

General information
- Location: Karmatar, Jamtara District, Jharkhand; India
- Coordinates: 24.08251°N 86.7043980584°E
- Elevation: 243 metres (797 ft)
- System: Indian Railways station
- Owner: Indian Railways
- Operator: Eastern Railway
- Line: Howrah–Delhi main line
- Platforms: 2
- Tracks: Broad gauge
- Connections: Auto stand, Bus stand

Construction
- Structure type: At grade
- Parking: Available
- Accessible: Available

Other information
- Status: Active
- Station code: VDS
- Zone(s): Eastern Railway
- Division(s): Asansol
- Classification: NSG-5

History
- Electrified: 1996–97
- Former names: East Indian Railway
Route map
Location
- Location within Jharkhand
- Interactive map

Vidyasagar railway station (station code: VDS) is a railway station on the Howrah–Delhi main line in Jamtara district, Jharkhand. It comes under the Asansol railway division of the Eastern Railway zone. The station was earlier known as Karmatanr and was renamed in honour of Ishwar Chandra Vidyasagar, the social reformer and educator who spent many years of his life in this area. The station serves the Karmatar village and its nearby rural areas. The station is also included under the Amrit Bharat Station Scheme for modernization and infrastructure upgrades.

== History ==
In 1974, Vidyasagar railway station was renamed in honour of the Bengali scholar and social reformer Ishwar Chandra Vidyasagar, who spent more than eighteen years of his life from 1873 to 1891 in the region. During his stay at Karmatar, Vidyasagar lived in a residence called Nandan Kanan and dedicated himself to social service and education. He established one of the first schools for Santhal girls, promoted literacy among the local tribal population and ran a free homeopathy clinic for the poor. Because of these activities, Karmatar came to be regarded as his “karma-bhumi” or land of work.

The renaming of the station was the result of efforts by the Bihar-Bengalee Association, which sought to commemorate Vidyasagar’s association with the area. Over time, the station precinct has also been developed with a park, a statue, and an open-air gallery depicting his life and contributions, giving the station a dual role as both a transport hub and a memorial site.

== Facilities ==
The station consists of two platforms for UP and DOWN route trains, connected by a foot overbridge. Basic amenities such as a waiting area, seating, drinking water, and toilets are available for passengers. A booking office and enquiry counter are located at the entrance. The circulating area has been upgraded in recent years with improved access roads and vehicle parking. As part of modernization, the station precinct also features a small park, decorative murals, and a statue of Ishwar Chandra Vidyasagar.

The station has been also selected under the Amrit Bharat Station Scheme for modernization. New facilities under construction include an upgraded station facade, improved passenger amenities and enhanced circulating areas aimed at meeting modern standards of convenience and accessibility for passengers.

== Trains ==
The station has stoppage for both express and suburban trains on the Howrah - New Delhi main line. It provides connectivity to nearby towns as well as major cities across Jharkhand, Bihar and West Bengal. The station also has connectivity for trains running towards Ranchi via Dhanbad.

== See also ==
- Asansol railway division
- Eastern Railway zone
- Howrah–Delhi main line
- Asansol–Patna section
