= Nala block =

Nala
- Community development block
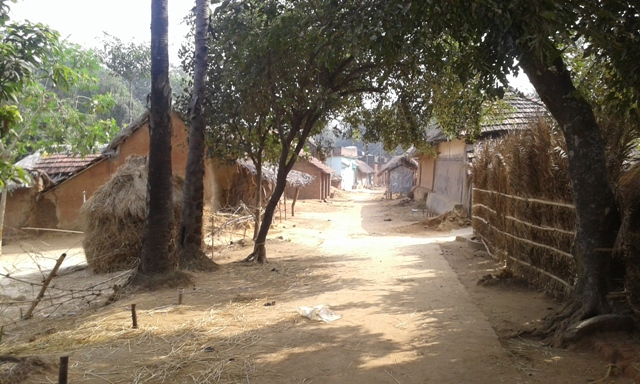
- Basudih Santal para

- Coordinates: 23°55′25″N 87°2′7″E
- Country: India
- State: Jharkhand
- District: Jamtara

Government
  - Type: Federal democracy

Area
  - Total: 416.67 km^{2} (160.88 sq mi)
- Elevation: 201 m (659 ft)

Population (2011)
  - Total: 134,780
  - Density: 323.47/km^{2} (837.78/sq mi)

Languages
  - Official: Santhali ,Hindi, Urdu

Literacy (2011)
  - Total literates: 74,171 (64.63%)
- Time zone: UTC+5:30 (IST)
- Vehicle registration: JH-21
- Lok Sabha constituency: Dumka
- Vidhan Sabha constituency: Nala
- Website: jamtara.nic.in

Nala is a community development block that forms an administrative division in the Jamtara Sadar subdivision of the Jamtara district, Jharkhand state, India. It is located 27 km from Jamtara, the district headquarters.

== Geography ==
Nala is located at 23°55′25″N 87°2′7″E.

Jamtara district in the south-eastern part of Santhal Parganas is a rolling upland tract. The Barakar separates it from the Chota Nagpur Plateau and the Ajay, flows in from Deoghar district in the west, drains the district, forms the border between Jharkhand and West Bengal for some distance and flows into West Bengal in the east.

Nala CD block is bounded by Fatehpur CD block on the north, Kundhit CD block and Khoyrasol CD block in Birbhum district, West Bengal, on the east, Jamuria, Barabani and Salanpur CD blocks in Paschim Bardhaman district, West Bengal, on the south, and Jamtara CD block on the west.

Nala CD block has an area of 416.67 km^{2}.Nala police station serves this block. Headquarters of this CD block is at Nala village.

Nala CD block has 23 panchayats and 251 villages.

Panchayats of Nala CD block are: Afjalpur, Bandardiha, Bararampur, Chaknayapara, Dalabar, Dhobna, Futberia, Geriya, Jamdehi, Kasta, Khaira, Kuldangal, Maheshmunda, Mahulbana, Moralo, Morbasa, Nala, Paikbarh, Pakuria, Panjunia, Saluka, Sripur and Tesjoriya.

== Demographics ==
=== Population ===
As per the 2011 Census of India Nala CD block had a total population of 134,780, all of which were rural. There were 68,771 (51%) males and 66,009 (49%) females. Population below 6 years was 20,014. Scheduled Castes numbered 16,718 (12.40%) and Scheduled Tribes numbered 48,626 (36.08%).

=== Literacy ===
As of 2011 census, the total number of literates in Nala CD Block was 74,171 (64.63% of the population over 6 years) out of which 44,655 (60%) were males and 29,516 (40%) were females. The gender disparity (the difference between female and male literacy rates) was 20%.

See also – List of Jharkhand districts ranked by literacy rate

Literacy in CD Blocks of
Jamtara district
Narayanpur – 55.72%
Karmatanr – 58.16%
Jamtara – 66.31%
Nala – 64.63%
Fatehpur – 65.66%
Kundhit – 63.64%
Source: 2011 Census: CD Block Wise
Primary Census Abstract Data

=== Language and religion ===
Religions in Nala block (2011)
Religion	Percent
Hinduism	93.38%
Islam	3.68%
Sarna	2.16%
Other or not stated	0.78%

Languages of Nala block (2011)
1. Bengali (61.3%)
2. Santali (34.2%)
3. Khortha (1.06%)
4. Others (3.47%)

At the time of the 2011 census, 61.27% of the population spoke Bengali, 34.20% Santali and 1.06% Khortha as their first language.

== Rural poverty ==
60-70% of the population of Jamtara district were in the BPL category in 2004–2005, being in the same category as Ranchi and Dumka districts. Rural poverty in Jharkhand declined from 66% in 1993–94 to 46% in 2004–05. In 2011, it has come down to 39.1%.

== Economy ==
=== Livelihood ===
Livelihood
in Nala CD block
1. Cultivators (34.3%)
2. Agricultural labourers (44.0%)
3. Household industries (4.23%)
4. Other Workers (17.5%)

In Nala CD block in 2011, amongst the class of total workers, cultivators numbered 18,501 and formed 34.33%, agricultural labourers numbered 23,698 and formed 43.97%, household industry workers numbered 2,279 and formed 4.23% and other workers numbered 9,412 and formed 17.47%. Total workers numbered 53,890 and formed 39.98% of the total population. Non-workers numbered 80,890 and formed 60.02% of total population.

Note: In the census records a person is considered a cultivator, if the person is engaged in cultivation/ supervision of land owned. When a person who works on another person's land for wages in cash or kind or share, is regarded as an agricultural labourer. Household industry is defined as an industry conducted by one or more members of the family within the household or village, and one that does not qualify for registration as a factory under the Factories Act. Other workers are persons engaged in some economic activity other than cultivators, agricultural labourers and household workers. It includes factory, mining, plantation, transport and office workers, those engaged in business and commerce, teachers and entertainment artistes.

=== Infrastructure ===
There are 242 inhabited villages in Nala CD block. In 2011, 112 villages had power supply. 5 villages had tap water (treated/ untreated), 217 villages had well water (covered/ uncovered), 236 villages had hand pumps, and all villages had drinking water facility. 20 villages had post offices, 18 villages had sub post offices, 23 villages had telephones (land lines), 21 villages had public call offices and 99 villages had mobile phone coverage. 239 villages had pucca (paved) village roads, 36 villages had bus service (public/ private), 6 villages had railway stations, 10 villages had autos/ modified autos, and 32 villages had tractors. 12 villages had bank branches, 7 villages had agricultural credit societies, 9 villages had cinema/ video halls, 3 villages had public library and public reading rooms. 71 villages had public distribution system, 23 villages had weekly haat (market) and 82 villages had assembly polling stations.

=== Backward Regions Grant Fund ===
Jamtara district is listed as a backward region and receives financial support from the Backward Regions Grant Fund. The fund created by the Government of India is designed to redress regional imbalances in development. As of 2012, 272 districts across the country were listed under this scheme. The list includes 21 districts of Jharkhand.

== Transportation ==
The Ajay forms the border between Jamtara district of Jharkhand and Bardhaman district of West Bengal. There is a bridge at Runakura Ghat. It connects to NH 19 (old numbering NH 2), Asansol city (29 km from Nala) and the collieries around Asansol.

== Education ==
Nala CD block had 19 villages with pre-primary schools, 194 villages with primary schools, 82 villages with middle schools, 13 villages with secondary schools, 8 villages with senior secondary schools, 1 village with general degree college, 47 villages with no educational facility.
.*Senior secondary schools are also known as Inter colleges in Jharkhand

Degree College, affiliated with Sido Kanhu Murmu University, was established in 1988 at Nala.

== Healthcare ==
Nala CD block had 1 village with community health centre, 5 villages with primary health centres, 5 villages with primary health subcentres, 1 village with maternity and child welfare centre, 1 Village with allopathic hospital, 1 village with dispensary, 1 village with veterinary hospital, 2 villages with family welfare centres, 5 villages with medicine shops.
.*Private medical practitioners, alternative medicine etc. not included

=== NGO working in Nala block ===
SANMAT : A Chennai Based NGO/Civil Society named Sanmat working on public health issues & community health. Sanmat is also taking care of MESO Hospital, Nala by providing operation & management support to ITDA. Another program which is being run by Sanmat is to train different SHG and villagers to turn them to economically empowered by creating village level entrepreneurs. Sanmat is also supporting Jharkhand Skill Development Mission as Training Partner.
