= Udalbani =

- Location in Jharkhand, India
- Coordinates: 23.621°N 86.282°E
- Country: India
- State: Jharkhand
- District: Jamtara district

Population (2011)
  - Total: 1,910

Language
  - Official: Hindi
- Time zone: UTC+5:30 (IST)

Udalbani is a village in Jamtara district of Jharkhand state of India. According to the 2011 Census of India, 1910 people lived here.

== See also ==
- Jamtara district
