= Narayanapuram =

Narayanapuram or Narayana Puram may refer to:

- Narayanapuram, Kanchipuram district, a neighbourhood in Tamil Nadu, India
- Narayanapuram, Khammam district, a village in the state of Telangana, India
- Narayanapuram, Krishna district, a village in Bantumilli mandal, Krishna district, Andhra Pradesh, India
- Narayanapuram, Parvathipuram Manyam district, a village in the state of Andhra Pradesh, India
- Narayanapuram, Yadadri Bhuvanagiri district, a village in the state of Telangana, India

== See also ==
- Narayanapur (disambiguation)
- Thirunarayanapuram, a Hindu shrine in Karnataka, India
