= Mihijam =

- Town
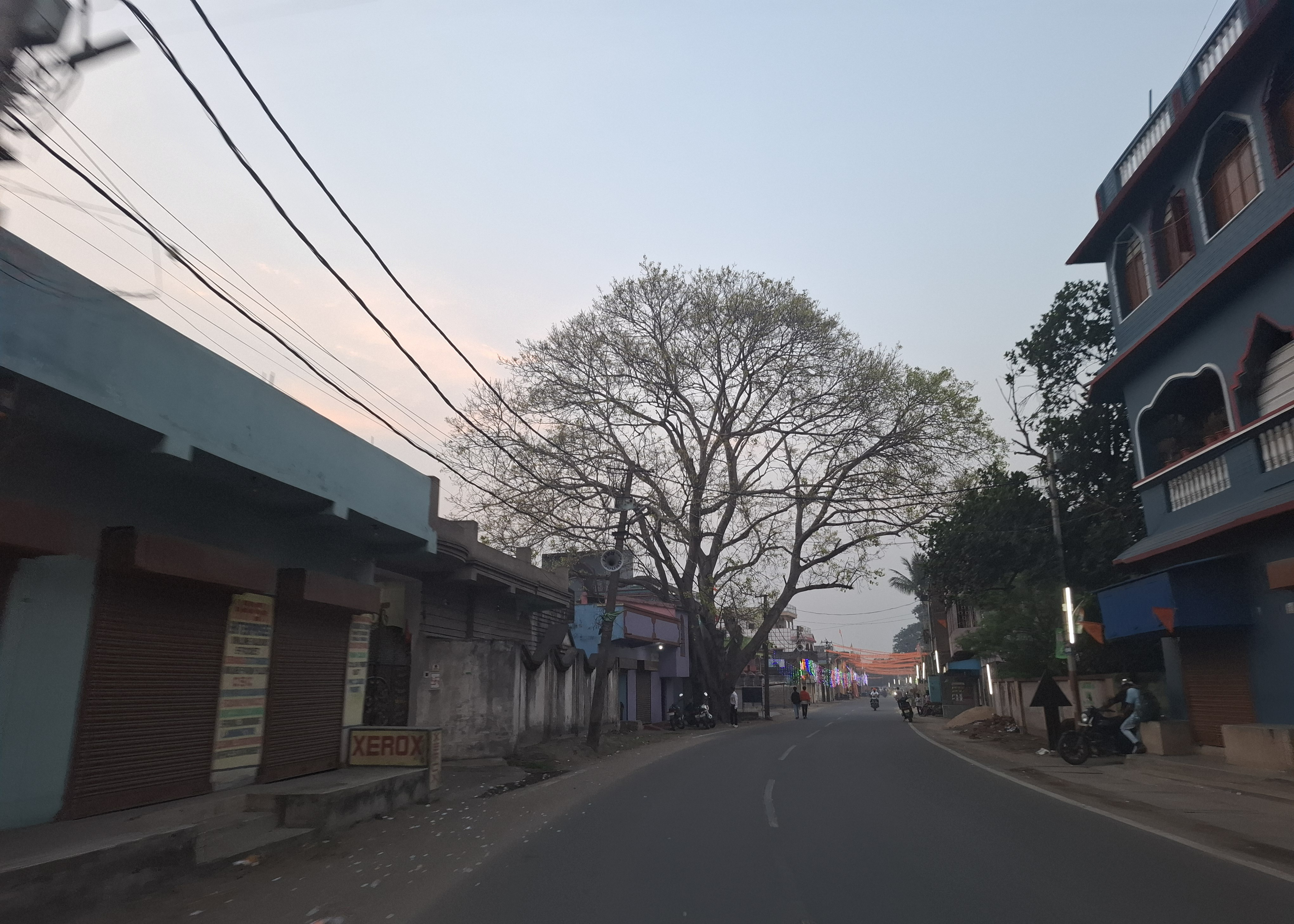
- Mihijam town

- Location in Jharkhand, India Mihijam (India)
- Coordinates: 23°50′50.604″N 86°52′56.224″E
- Country: India
- State: Jharkhand
- District: Jamtara

Population (2011)
  - Total: 40,463

Languages (*For language details see Jamtara block#Language and religion)
  - Official: Hindi, Urdu
- Time zone: UTC+5:30 (IST)
- PIN: 815354
- Vehicle registration: JH 21
- Website: jamtara.nic.in

Mihijam is a town and a notified area in the Jamtara Sadar subdivision of the Jamtara district in the Indian state of Jharkhand.

== Geography ==
Cities, towns and locations in the Deoghar, Dumka and Jamtara districts in Santhal Pargana Division
M: Municipality, CT: census town, R: Rural/ Urban centre, D: Dam,
Owing to space constraints in the small map, the actual locations in a larger map may vary slightly

=== Location ===
Mihijam is located at 23.87°N 86.87°E

=== Overview ===
The map shows a large area, which is a plateau with low hills, except in the eastern portion where the Rajmahal hills intrude into this area and the Ramgarh hills are there. The south-western portion is just a rolling upland. The entire area is overwhelmingly rural with only small pockets of urbanisation.

Note: The full screen map is interesting. All places marked on the map are linked in the full screen map and one can easily move on to another page of his/her choice. Enlarge the full screen map to see what else is there – one gets railway connections, many more road connections and so on.

== History ==
In 1922, Mahendranath Gupta lived in Mihijam for nine months.

== Transport ==
The city has a bus stand in front of the Chittaranjan railway station. The Bus stand hosts many buses either originating or coming from different parts of Jharkhand, Bihar and West Bengal, Further the Chittaranjan Railway Station helps it connect with almost all of the cities in India directly through train service.The railway station was originally named as Mihijam since 1867, when the Raniganj - Kiul railway route was started, later it was renamed as Chittaranjan on 26.01.1950. Nearest domestic airport is Kazi Nazrul Islam Airport Durgapur, 57 kms away.

== Other notable details ==
It is well known for Homeopathy. The Homoeopathic Medical College and Hospital of Mihijam affiliated to Vinoba Bhave University Jamtara, Jharkhand, India was the first Homeopathic college in India and hence it is very popular among students.

=== Languages ===
Languages spoken in Mihijam Town (2011)
1. Hindi (48.0%)
2. Bengali (16.3%)
3. Bhojpuri (8.41%)
4. Magadhi (8.05%)
5. Khortha (7.51%)
6. Santali (4.21%)
7. Others (7.47%)
