= Kundhit block =

Kundhit
- Community development block
- Coordinates: 23°58′6″N 87°9′52″E
- Country: India
- State: Jharkhand
- District: Jamtara

Government
  - Type: Federal democracy

Area
  - Total: 295.63 km^{2} (114.14 sq mi)
- Elevation: 201 m (659 ft)

Population (2011)
  - Total: 84,907
  - Density: 287.21/km^{2} (743.86/sq mi)

Languages
  - Official: Hindi, Urdu, Bengali

Literacy (2011)
  - Total literates: 50,627 (64.64%)
- Time zone: UTC+5:30 (IST)
- Vehicle registration: JH-21
- Lok Sabha constituency: Dumka
- Vidhan Sabha constituency: Nala
- Website: jamtara.nic.in

Kundhit (also spelled as Kundahit) is a community development block that forms an administrative division in the Jamtara Sadar subdivision of the Jamtara district, Jharkhand state, India. It is located 42 km from Jamtara, the district headquarters.

== Geography ==
Kundahit, the block headquarters, is located at 23°58′6″N 87°9′52″E.

Jamtara district in the south-eastern part of Santhal Parganas is a rolling upland tract. The Barakar separates it from the Chota Nagpur Plateau and the Ajay, flows in from Deoghar district in the west, drains the district, forms the border between Jharkhand and West Bengal for some distance and flows into West Bengal in the east.

Kundhit CD block is bounded by Masalia CD block in Dumka district on the north, Khoyrasol and Rajnagar CD blocks in Birbhum district, West Bengal, on the east, Khoyrasol CD block on the south and Nala and Fatehpur CD blocks on the west.

Kundhit CD block has an area of 295.63 km^{2}.Kundahit and Bagdahari police stations serve this block. Headquarters of this CD block is at Kundahit village.

Kundhit CD block has 15 panchayats and 172 villages.

Panchayats of Kundhit CD block are: Amba, Amladehi, Babupur, Bagdehri, Bankatti, Bhailua, Bikrampur, Gaipathar, Garjori, Khajuri, Kundhit, Muraberia, Nagri, Palajori and Sudrakshipur.

== Demographics ==
=== Population ===
As per the 2011 Census of India Kundhit CD block had a total population of 84,907, all of which were rural. There were 43,437 (51%) males and 41,470 (49%) females. Population below 6 years was 11,581. Scheduled Castes numbered 13,002 (15.31%) and Scheduled Tribes numbered 25,309 (29.81%).

=== Literacy ===
As of 2011 census, the total number of literates in Kundhit CD Block was 50,627 (64.64% of the population over 6 years) out of which 29,483 (59%) were males and 20,784 (41%) were females. The gender disparity (the difference between female and male literacy rates) was 18%.

See also – List of Jharkhand districts ranked by literacy rate

Literacy in CD Blocks of
Jamtara district
Narayanpur – 55.72%
Karmatanr – 58.16%
Jamtara – 66.31%
Nala – 64.63%
Fatehpur – 65.66%
Kundhit – 63.64%
Source: 2011 Census: CD Block Wise
Primary Census Abstract Data

=== Language and religion ===
Religions in Kundhit block (2011)
Religion	Percent
Hinduism	86.31%
Islam	7.61%
Sarna	5.58%
Other or not stated	0.50%

Languages of Kundhit block (2011)
1. Bengali (63.0%)
2. Santali (27.5%)
3. Hindi (4.83%)
4. Khortha (2.57%)
5. Others (2.09%)

At the time of the 2011 census, 63.04% of the population spoke Bengali, 27.47% Santali, 4.83% Hindi and 2.57% Khortha as their first language.

== Rural poverty ==
60-70% of the population of Jamtara district were in the BPL category in 2004–2005, being in the same category as Ranchi and Dumka districts. Rural poverty in Jharkhand declined from 66% in 1993–94 to 46% in 2004–05. In 2011, it has come down to 39.1%.

== Economy ==
=== Livelihood ===
Livelihood
in Kundhit CD block
1. Cultivators (32.7%)
2. Agricultural labourers (49.9%)
3. Household industries (4.12%)
4. Other Workers (13.2%)

In Kundhit CD block in 2011, amongst the class of total workers, cultivators numbered 12,769 and formed 32.72%, agricultural labourers numbered 19,484 and formed 49.43%, household industry workers numbered 1,609 and formed 4.12% and other workers numbered 5,159 and formed 13.22%. Total workers numbered 39,021 and formed 45.96% of the total population. Non-workers numbered 45,886 and formed 54.04% of total population.

Note: In the census records a person is considered a cultivator, if the person is engaged in cultivation/ supervision of land owned. When a person who works on another person's land for wages in cash or kind or share, is regarded as an agricultural labourer. Household industry is defined as an industry conducted by one or more members of the family within the household or village, and one that does not qualify for registration as a factory under the Factories Act. Other workers are persons engaged in some economic activity other than cultivators, agricultural labourers and household workers. It includes factory, mining, plantation, transport and office workers, those engaged in business and commerce, teachers and entertainment artistes.

=== Infrastructure ===
There are 156 inhabited villages in Kundhit CD block. In 2011, 108 villages had power supply. 1 village had tap water (treated/ untreated), 154 villages had well water (covered/ uncovered), 153 villages had hand pumps, and all villages had drinking water facility. 11 villages had post offices, 2 villages had sub post offices, 2 villages had telephones (land lines), 14 villages had public call offices and 109 villages had mobile phone coverage. 154 villages had pucca (paved) village roads, 28 villages had bus service (public/ private), 1 village had railway station, 2 villages had autos/ modified autos, and 26 villages had tractors. 6 villages had bank branches, 1 village had agricultural credit society, 2 villages had public library and public reading rooms. 43 villages had public distribution system, 4 villages had weekly haat (market) and 68 villages had assembly polling stations.

=== Backward Regions Grant Fund ===
Jamtara district is listed as a backward region and receives financial support from the Backward Regions Grant Fund. The fund created by the Government of India is designed to redress regional imbalances in development. As of 2012, 272 districts across the country were listed under this scheme. The list includes 21 districts of Jharkhand.

== Education ==
Kundhit CD block had 13 villages with pre-primary schools, 135 villages with primary schools, 53 villages with middle schools, 6 villages with secondary schools, 2 villages with senior secondary schools, 1 village with general degree college, 21 villages with no educational facility.
.*Senior secondary schools are also known as Inter colleges in Jharkhand

Bhagwat Jha Azad College, affiliated with Sido Kanhu Murmu University, was established at Kundahit.

== Healthcare ==
Kundhit CD block had 4 villages with primary health centres, 6 villages with primary health subcentres, 2 villages with maternity and child welfare centres, 1 village with veterinary hospital, 16 villages with medicine shops.
.*Private medical practitioners, alternative medicine etc. not included
