= Karmatanr, Jamtara =

Karmatanr
- Census Town
- Location in Jharkhand, India Karmatanr (India)
- Coordinates: 24.093889°N 86.704222°E
- Country: India
- State: Jharkhand
- District: Jamtara

Population (2011)
  - Total: 5,868

Languages
  - Official: Hindi, Urdu
- Time zone: UTC+5:30 (IST)
- Lok Sabha constituency: Dumka
- Vidhan Sabha constituency: Sarath
- Website: jamtara.nic.in

Karmatanr is a census town in Karmatanr CD block in the Jamtara Sadar subdivision of the Jamtara district in the Indian state of Jharkhand.

== History ==
Ishwar Chandra Vidyasagar, the scholar-social reformer and a key figure in the Bengal Renaissance came to Karmatar in 1873 and spent more than 18 years of his life here. In 1974, the railway station at Karmatar was renamed after him.

== Geography ==
Cities, towns and locations in the Deoghar, Dumka and Jamtara districts in Santhal Pargana Division
M: Municipality, CT: census town, R: Rural/ Urban centre, D: Dam,
Owing to space constraints in the small map, the actual locations in a larger map may vary slightly

=== Location ===
Karmatanr is located at 24.093889°N 86.704222°E.

=== Overview ===
The map shows a large area, which is a plateau with low hills, except in the eastern portion where the Rajmahal hills intrude into this area and the Ramgarh hills are there. The south-western portion is just a rolling upland. The area is overwhelmingly rural with only small pockets of urbanisation.

Note: The full screen map is interesting. All places marked on the map are linked in the full screen map and one can easily move on to another page of his/her choice. Enlarge the full screen map to see what else is there – one gets railway connections, many more road connections and so on.

== Demographics ==
As per the 2011 Census of India, Karmatanr had a total population of 5,868 of which 3,014 (51%) were males and 2,854 (49%) were females. Population below 6 years was 1,031. The total number of literates in Karmatanr was 3,574 (73.89% of the population over 6 years).
