= Rabindra Nath Mahato =

Indian politician

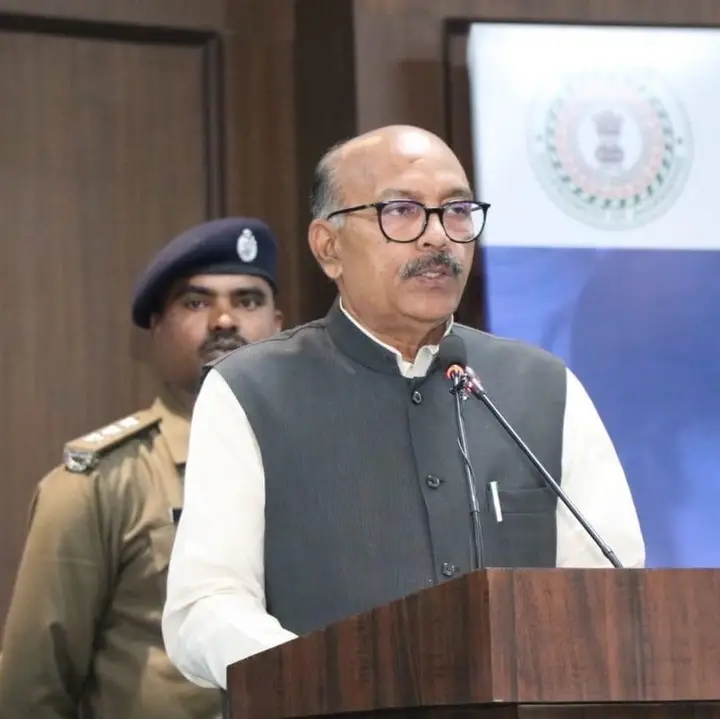
- Speaker of Legislative Assembly

7th Speaker of the Jharkhand Legislative Assembly
- Incumbent
- Assumed office 6 January 2020
- Deputy: Vacant
- Leader of the House: Hemant Soren (current)
- Preceded by: Dinesh Oraon

MLA Jharkhand Legislative Assembly
- Incumbent
- Assumed office December 2014
- Preceded by: Satyanand Jha
- Constituency: Nala
- In office 2005–2009
- Preceded by: Dr. Vishweshwar Khan

Personal details
- Born: 12 January 1960 (age 66) Patanpur Jamtara, Bihar (Now in Jharkhand)
- Party: Jharkhand Mukti Morcha
- Children: 2 Kunal Kanchan Yadav Priyanka
- Parents: Golak Bihari Mahato (father); Roop Manjari Devi (mother)

Rabindra Nath Mahato is an Indian politician. He serves as 7th Speaker of the Jharkhand Legislative Assembly since 2020. He belongs to Jharkhand Mukti Morcha.

== Early life ==
Rabindra Nath Mahato was born in Krishnapur on 12 January 1960 in a Ahir family in his father's hometown of Fatehpur Jamtara in the Indian State of Jharkhand. Rabindra Nath Mahato graduated from Bhagalpur University Bhagalpur. He completed B.ed. from Utkal University Odisha. His father is a retired primary school teacher.

== Political career ==
He started his political career from Barawa, Jamtara Jharkhand as an independent candidate. He contested against 9-time MLA Dr. Vishweshwar Khan and lost that election.

He joined Shibu Soren during Jharkhand Movement and soon due to his leadership quality and personality he became the leader of Jharkhand Mukti Morcha.

Later he won his first election to Jharkhand Legislative Assembly from Nala in 2005 but lost in 2009 before winning again in 2014 and 2019. In the Assembly election of 2019 the JMM along with INC and RJD formed the Government. Mahato was elected as the 7th speaker of Jharkhand Vidhan Sabha. As Speaker he took important measures to improve legislature. The Assembly had been experiencing frequent disruptions, Mahato took opposition leaders on board and utilized the time of debate and discourse. Recently under his direction Jharkhand Vidhan Sabha celebrated its 20th foundation day.

== See also ==
- Jharkhand Mukti Morcha
- Hemant Soren
- Jharkhand Legislative Assembly
