= Narayanpur block =

- Community development block
- Coordinates: 24°2′34″N 86°37′4″E
- Country: India
- State: Jharkhand
- District: Jamtara

Government
  - Type: Federal democracy

Area
  - Total: 282.80 km^{2} (109.19 sq mi)
- Elevation: 250 m (820 ft)

Population (2011)
  - Total: 163,993
  - Density: 579.89/km^{2} (1,501.9/sq mi)

Languages
  - Official: Hindi, Urdu

Literacy (2011)
  - Total literates: 72,725 (55.72%)
- Time zone: UTC+5:30 (IST)
- PIN: 815352 (Narayanpur)
- Telephone/STD code: 06433
- Vehicle registration: JH-21
- Lok Sabha constituency: Dumka
- Vidhan Sabha constituency: Jamtara
- Website: jamtara.nic.in

Narayanpur is a community development block that forms an administrative division in the Jamtara Sadar subdivision in the Jamtara district, Jharkhand state, India. It is located 24 km from Jamtara, the district headquarters.

== Geography ==
Narayanpur is located at 24°2′34″N 86°37′4″E.

Jamtara district in the south-eastern part of Santhal Parganas is a rolling upland tract. The Barakar separates it from the Chota Nagpur Plateau and the Ajay, flows in from Deoghar district in the west, drains the district, forms the border between Jharkhand and West Bengal for some distance and flows into West Bengal in the east.

Narayanpur CD block is bounded by Margomunda CD block in Deoghar district on the north, Karmatanr and Jamtara CD blocks on the east, Tundi and Purbi Tundi CD blocks in Dhanbad district on the south, and Gandey CD block on the west.

Narayanpur CD block has an area of 282.80 km^{2}.Naryanpur police station serves this block. Headquarters of this CD block is at Narayanpur.

Narayanpur CD block has 25 panchayats and 262 villages.

Panchayats of Narayanpur CD block are: Bandarchuan, Bankudih, Borwa, Budhudih, Butberiya, Chadadih Lakhanpur, Champapur, Davakendra, Dewalbari, Dighari, Jhiluwa, Korodoh – 1, Kurta, Madnadih, Manjhaldih, Narayanpur, Narodih, Nawadih, Nayadih, Pabiya, Posta, Roopdih, Sabanpur, Saharpur and Topatarn.

== Demographics ==
=== Population ===
As per the 2011 Census of India Narayanpur CD block had a total population of 163,966, all of which were rural. There were 83,977 (51%) males and 79,989 (49%) females. Population below 6 years was 33,482. Scheduled Castes numbered 9,501 (5.79%) and Scheduled Tribes numbered 38,485 (23.47%).

=== Literacy ===
As of 2011 census, the total number of literates in Narayanpur CD block was 72,725 (55.72% of the population over 6 years) out of which 45,694 (63%) were males and 27,031 (37%) were females. The gender disparity (the difference between female and male literacy rates) was 26%.

See also – List of Jharkhand districts ranked by literacy rate

Literacy in CD Blocks of
Jamtara district
Narayanpur – 55.72%
Karmatanr – 58.16%
Jamtara – 66.31%
Nala – 64.63%
Fatehpur – 65.66%
Kundhit – 63.64%
Source: 2011 Census: CD Block Wise
Primary Census Abstract Data

=== Language and religion ===
Religions in Narayanpur block (2011)
Religion	Percent
Hinduism	50.40%
Islam	41.86%
Sarna	6.84%
Christianity	0.43%
Other or not stated	0.32%

Languages of Narayanpur block (2011)
1. Khortha (57.0%)
2. Santali (23.1%)
3. Urdu (7.83%)
4. Bengali (6.67%)
5. Hindi (4.33%)
6. Others (1.08%)

At the time of the 2011 census, 56.96% of the population spoke Khortha, 23.13% Santali, 7.83% Urdu, 6.67% Bengali and 4.33% Hindi as their first language.

== Rural poverty ==
60-70% of the population of Jamtara district were in the BPL category in 2004–2005, being in the same category as Ranchi and Dumka districts. Rural poverty in Jharkhand declined from 66% in 1993–94 to 46% in 2004–05. In 2011, it has come down to 39.1%.

== Economy ==
=== Livelihood ===
Livelihood
in Narayanpur CD block
1. Cultivators (30.1%)
2. Agricultural labourers (53.0%)
3. Household industries (3.75%)
4. Other Workers (13.1%)

In Narayanpur CD block in 2011, amongst the class of total workers, cultivators numbered 19,390 and formed 30.12%, agricultural labourers numbered 34,154 and formed 53.05%, household industry workers numbered 2,316 and formed 3.75% and other workers numbered 8,418 and formed 13.08%. Total workers numbered 64,378 and formed 39.26% of the total population. Non-workers numbered 99,588 and formed 60.74% of total population.

Note: In the census records a person is considered a cultivator, if the person is engaged in cultivation/ supervision of land owned. When a person who works on another person's land for wages in cash or kind or share, is regarded as an agricultural labourer. Household industry is defined as an industry conducted by one or more members of the family within the household or village, and one that does not qualify for registration as a factory under the Factories Act. Other workers are persons engaged in some economic activity other than cultivators, agricultural labourers and household workers. It includes factory, mining, plantation, transport and office workers, those engaged in business and commerce, teachers and entertainment artistes.

=== Infrastructure ===
There are 247 inhabited villages in Narayanpur CD block. In 2011, 97 villages had power supply. 10 villages had tap water (treated/ untreated), 243 villages had well water (covered/ uncovered), 243 villages had hand pumps, and all villages had drinking water facility. 15 villages had post offices, 5 villages had sub post offices, 5 villages had telephones (land lines), 7 villages had public call offices and 43 villages had mobile phone coverage. 244 villages had pucca (paved) village roads, 65 villages had bus service (public/ private), 2 villages had railway stations, 4 villages had autos/ modified autos, and 17 villages had tractors. 8 villages had bank branches, 73 villages had agricultural credit societies, 2 villages had cinema/ video halls, 5 villages had public library and public reading rooms. 100 villages had public distribution system, 20 villages had weekly haat (market) and 138 villages had assembly polling stations.

=== Backward Regions Grant Fund ===
Jamtara district is listed as a backward region and receives financial support from the Backward Regions Grant Fund. The fund created by the Government of India is designed to redress regional imbalances in development. As of 2012, 272 districts across the country were listed under this scheme. The list includes 21 districts of Jharkhand.

== Education ==
Narayanpur CD block had 8 villages with pre-primary schools, 219 villages with primary schools, 81 villages with middle schools, 1 village with secondary school, 1 village with senior secondary school, 28 villages with no educational facility.
.*Senior secondary schools are also known as Inter colleges in Jharkhand

== Healthcare ==
Narayanpur CD block had 1 village with community health centre, 5 villages with primary health centres, 38 villages with primary health subcentre, 33 villages with maternity and child welfare centres, 11 villages with TB clinics, 3 villages with allopathic hospitals, 34 villages with dispensaries, 5 villages with veterinary hospitals, 26 villages with family welfare centres, 91 villages with medicine shops.
.*Private medical practitioners, alternative medicine etc. not included
