= Jamtara block =

Jamtara
- Community development block
- Coordinates: 23°57′48″N 86°48′5″E
- Country: India
- State: Jharkhand
- District: Jamtara

Government
  - Type: Federal democracy

Area
  - Total: 329.73 km^{2} (127.31 sq mi)
- Elevation: 201 m (659 ft)

Population (2011)
  - Total: 132,600
  - Density: 402.1/km^{2} (1,042/sq mi)

Languages
  - Official: Hindi, Urdu

Literacy (2011)
  - Total literates: 74,330 (66.30%)
- Time zone: UTC+5:30 (IST)
- PIN: 815351 (Jamtara)
- Telephone/STD code: 06433
- Vehicle registration: JH-21
- Lok Sabha constituency: Dumka
- Vidhan Sabha constituency: Jamtara, Sarath
- Website: jamtara.nic.in

Jamtara is a community development block that forms an administrative division in the Jamtara Sadar subdivision of the Jamtara district, Jharkhand state, India.

== Geography ==
Jamtara is located at 23°57′48″N 86°48′5″E.

Jamtara district in the south-eastern part of Santhal Parganas is a rolling upland tract. The Barakar separates it from the Chota Nagpur Plateau and the Ajay, flows in from Deoghar district in the west, drains the district, forms the border between Jharkhand and West Bengal for some distance and flows into West Bengal in the east.

Jamtara CD block is bounded by the Narayanpur and Karmatanr CD blocks on the north, Fatehpur and Nala CD blocks on the east, Salanpur CD block in Paschim Bardhaman district in West Bengal, on the south, and Nirsa CD block in Dhanbad district on the west.

Jamtara CD block has an area of 329.73 km^{2}.Jamtara and Mihijam police stations serve this block. Headquarters of this CD block is at Jamtara.

Jamtara CD block has 22 panchayats and 150 villages.

Panchayats of Jamtara CD block are: Barjora, Bewa, Chalna, Chandradipa, Chengaidih, Duladih, Gopalpur, Jiajori, Kushbhedia, Ladhna, Menjhiya, Pnjaniya, Piyalsola, Ranidih, Shahardal, Shaharpura, Siulibari, Sonbad, Sukhjora, Supaidih and Udalbani.

== Demographics ==
=== Population ===
As per the 2011 Census of India Jamtara CD block had a total population of 132,600, all of which were rural. There were 67,389 (51%) males and 65,211 (49%) females. Population below 6 years was 20,497. Scheduled Castes numbered 9,182 (6.92%) and Scheduled Tribes numbered 60,008 (45.25%).

Nagar parishads in Jamtara CD block are (2011 census figure in brackets): Jamtara (29,415), Mihijam (40,463).

Large villages (with 4,000+ population) in Jamtara CD block are (2011 census figure in brackets): Beoa (4,435), Kusbedia (4,111), Chengaidi (5,754).

=== Literacy ===
As of 2011 census the total number of literates in Jamtara CD Block was 74,330 (66.30% of the population over 6 years) out of which 45,003 (61%) were males and 29,327 (39%) were females. The gender disparity (the difference between female and male literacy rates) was 22%.

See also – List of Jharkhand districts ranked by literacy rate

Literacy in CD Blocks of
Jamtara district
Narayanpur – 55.72%
Karmatanr – 58.16%
Jamtara – 66.31%
Nala – 64.63%
Fatehpur – 65.66%
Kundhit – 63.64%
Source: 2011 Census: CD Block Wise
Primary Census Abstract Data

=== Language and religion ===
Religions in Jamtara block (2011)
Religion	Percent
Hinduism	68.56%
Sarna	15.31%
Islam	14.80%
Christianity	0.85%
Other or not stated	0.48%

Languages of Jamtara block (2011)
1. Santali (30.2%)
2. Bengali (27.0%)
3. Khortha (17.3%)
4. Hindi (15.3%)
5. Magahi (3.11%)
6. Urdu (2.77%)
7. Bhojpuri (2.07%)
8. Others (2.24%)

At the time of the 2011 census, 30.18% of the population spoke Santali, 27.04% Bengali, 17.30% Khortha, 15.29% Hindi, 3.11% Magahi, 2.77% Urdu and 2.07% Bhojpuri as their first language.

== Rural poverty ==
60-70% of the population of Jamtara district were in the BPL category in 2004–2005, being in the same category as Ranchi and Dumka districts. Rural poverty in Jharkhand declined from 66% in 1993–94 to 46% in 2004–05. In 2011, it has come down to 39.1%.

== Economy ==
=== Livelihood ===
Livelihood
in Jamtara CD block
1. Cultivators (33.6%)
2. Agricultural labourers (32.3%)
3. Household industries (3.75%)
4. Other Workers (30.4%)

In Jamtara CD block in 2011, amongst the class of total workers, cultivators numbered 18,546 and formed 33.59%, agricultural labourers numbered 17,845 and formed 32.32%, household industry workers numbered 2,069 and formed 3.75% and other workers numbered 16,755 and formed 30.35%. Total workers numbered 76,681 and formed 37.87% of the total population. Non-workers numbered 125,797 and formed 62.13% of total population.

Note: In the census records a person is considered a cultivator, if the person is engaged in cultivation/ supervision of land owned. When a person who works on another person's land for wages in cash or kind or share, is regarded as an agricultural labourer. Household industry is defined as an industry conducted by one or more members of the family within the household or village, and one that does not qualify for registration as a factory under the Factories Act. Other workers are persons engaged in some economic activity other than cultivators, agricultural labourers and household workers. It includes factory, mining, plantation, transport and office workers, those engaged in business and commerce, teachers and entertainment artistes.

=== Infrastructure ===
There are 124 inhabited villages in Jamtara CD block. In 2011, 109 villages had power supply. 121 villages had well water (covered/ uncovered), 121 villages had hand pumps, and all villages had drinking water facility. 16 villages had post offices, 12 villages had sub post offices, 5 villages had telephones (land lines), 22 villages had public call offices and 74 villages had mobile phone coverage. 121 villages had pucca (paved) village roads, 11 villages had bus service (public/ private), 3 villages had railway stations, 15 villages had autos/ modified autos, and 53 villages had tractors. 3 villages had bank branches, 1 village had agricultural credit society, 3 villages had cinema/ video halls, 3 villages had public library and public reading rooms. 46 villages had public distribution system, 6 villages had weekly haat (market) and 78 villages had assembly polling stations.

=== Backward Regions Grant Fund ===
Jamtara district is listed as a backward region and receives financial support from the Backward Regions Grant Fund. The fund created by the Government of India is designed to redress regional imbalances in development. As of 2012, 272 districts across the country were listed under this scheme. The list includes 21 districts of Jharkhand.

== Transportation ==
The Ranigunj-Kiul section of the Howrah-Delhi main line was in position in 1871. It provided rail link for Jamtara.

== Education ==
Jamtara CD block had 26 villages with pre-primary schools, 112 villages with primary schools, 72 villages with middle schools, 7 villages with secondary schools, 12 villages with no educational facility.

Jamtara College, affiliated with Sido Kanhu Murmu University, was established at Jamtara in 1961.

Jamtara Sandhya Mahila College, affiliated with Sido Kanhu Murmu University, was established at Jamtara.

J.J.S. College, affiliated with Sido Kanhu Murmu University, was established at Mihijam.

The Homeopathic College and Hospital, was established at Mihijam.

== Healthcare ==
Jamtara CD block had 4 villages with primary health centres, 25 villages with primary health subcentres, 9 villages with maternity and child welfare centres, 2 villages with allopathic hospitals, 3 villages with family welfare centres, 11 villages with medicine shops.
.*Private medical practitioners, alternative medicine etc. not included
