= Narainpur =

Narainpur may refer to the following places in India:

- Narayanpur, Chhattisgarh
- Narayanpur district, Chhattisgarh
- Narainpur, a village in Mirzapur District, Uttar Pradesh, India
- Narainpur, a village in Pindra, Varanasi District, Uttar Pradesh
- Narainpur, a village in Kerakat, Jaunpur District, Uttar pradesh

== See also ==
- Narayanpur (disambiguation)
