= Chittaranjan railway station =

Railway station in Jharkhand, India

CHITTARANJAN Mihijam

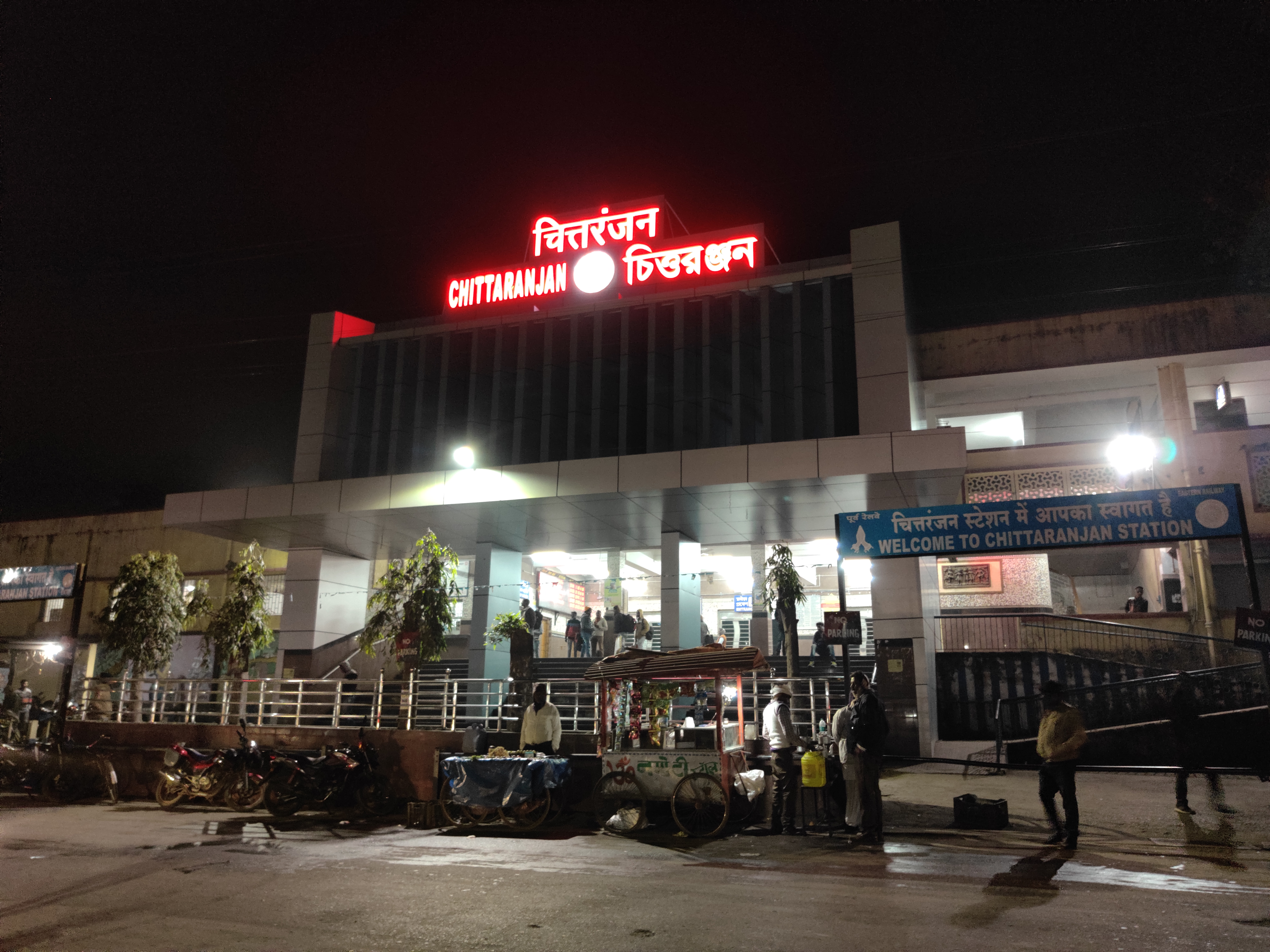
- Chittaranjan railway station building

General information
- Location: Chittaranjan, Jamtara district, Jharkhand; India
- Coordinates: 23°51′24″N 86°52′44″E
- Elevation: 177.74 metres (583.1 ft)
- System: Indian Railways station
- Owner: Indian Railways
- Operator: Eastern Railway
- Line: Howrah–Delhi main line
- Platforms: 3
- Tracks: Broad gauge

Construction
- Structure type: At grade
- Parking: Available

Other information
- Status: Functional
- Station code: CRJ
- Zone(s): Eastern Railway
- Division(s): Asansol

History
- Opened: 1867; 159 years ago
- Rebuilt: Renamed as Chittaranjan in 1950
- Former names: Mihijam
Route map
Location
- Location within Jharkhand Location within India
- Interactive map of Chittaranjan

Chittaranjan railway station, formerly known as Mihijam railway station, station code CRJ, is the railway station in Mihijam, Jamtara district in the Indian state of Jharkhand. Chittaranjan railway station lies on the Howrah–Delhi main line on the Asansol–Patna section. The railway station is named after the Indian freedom fighter, Deshbandhu Chittaranjan Das.

Chittaranjan railway station serves Mihijam and Chittaranjan township. The railway station is located in Mihijam, which is in Jharkhand, whereas the township falls in West Bengal. The Chittaranjan railway station is in Howrah–Delhi main line at a distance of 237 km from Howrah. The nearest major railway junction is Asansol, 25 km away.

== History ==
The earlier name of the station was Mihijam, opened in 1867. When the Chittaranjan Locomotive Works was established at Chittaranjan, the station's name was changed to Chittaranjan on 26 January 1950.

== Facilities ==
The station is rated as NSG-5 category station having an income of 8 crores and above per year. The major facilities available are waiting rooms, retiring room, ramp, dormitory, computerized reservation counter, 2 Wheeler Vehicle parking. The station holds a Premium Lounge for Passengers and a Heritage Art Gallery for History Enthusiasts which depicts History of Indian Railways like feasibility studies and other information in pictorial form along with the description. The station also has free and fast Railwire WiFi.

Also as per the latest reports, escalator installation is planned and construction to start soon after tender. Coach indicators will be installed in coming days. The station has a telephone booth, ATM counter, toilets, tea stall and book stall.

=== Platforms ===
There are 3 platforms here. Platform no. 1 and 2 cater to down trains (Asansol/Dhanbad/Howrah/Sealdah/Kolkata bound trains) though platform no. 2 is predominantly used to the service of Express/Mail/Superfast trains whereas platform no. 1 is also used for EMU local trains, passenger trains, and low-priority express trains. Platform 3 is completely dedicated to up trains (New Delhi/Patna/Jhajha/Jasidih/Amritsar/Barauni/Raxaul bound trains). The platforms are connected by an over-bridge covered on either side to ensure the security of the passengers. Beyond platform no. 3 there is a raised platform for loading and unloading goods. This platform serves freight trains. A total of 5 tracks exist here 4 main + 1-yard track.

== Trains ==
Many passenger and express trains serve Chittaranjan station.

== Nearest airports ==
The nearest airports to Chittaranjan station are:

1. Kazi Nazrul Islam Airport Durgapur 61 kilometres (38 mi)
2. Deoghar Airport, Jharkhand 91 kilometres (57 mi)
3. Birsa Munda Airport, Ranchi 190 kilometres (120 mi)
4. Netaji Subhash Chandra Bose International Airport, Kolkata 233 kilometres (145 mi)
5. Gaya Airport 245 kilometres (152 mi)
6. Lok Nayak Jayaprakash Airport, Patna 296 kilometres (184 mi)

== See also ==
- Chittaranjan Locomotive Works

== Gallery ==
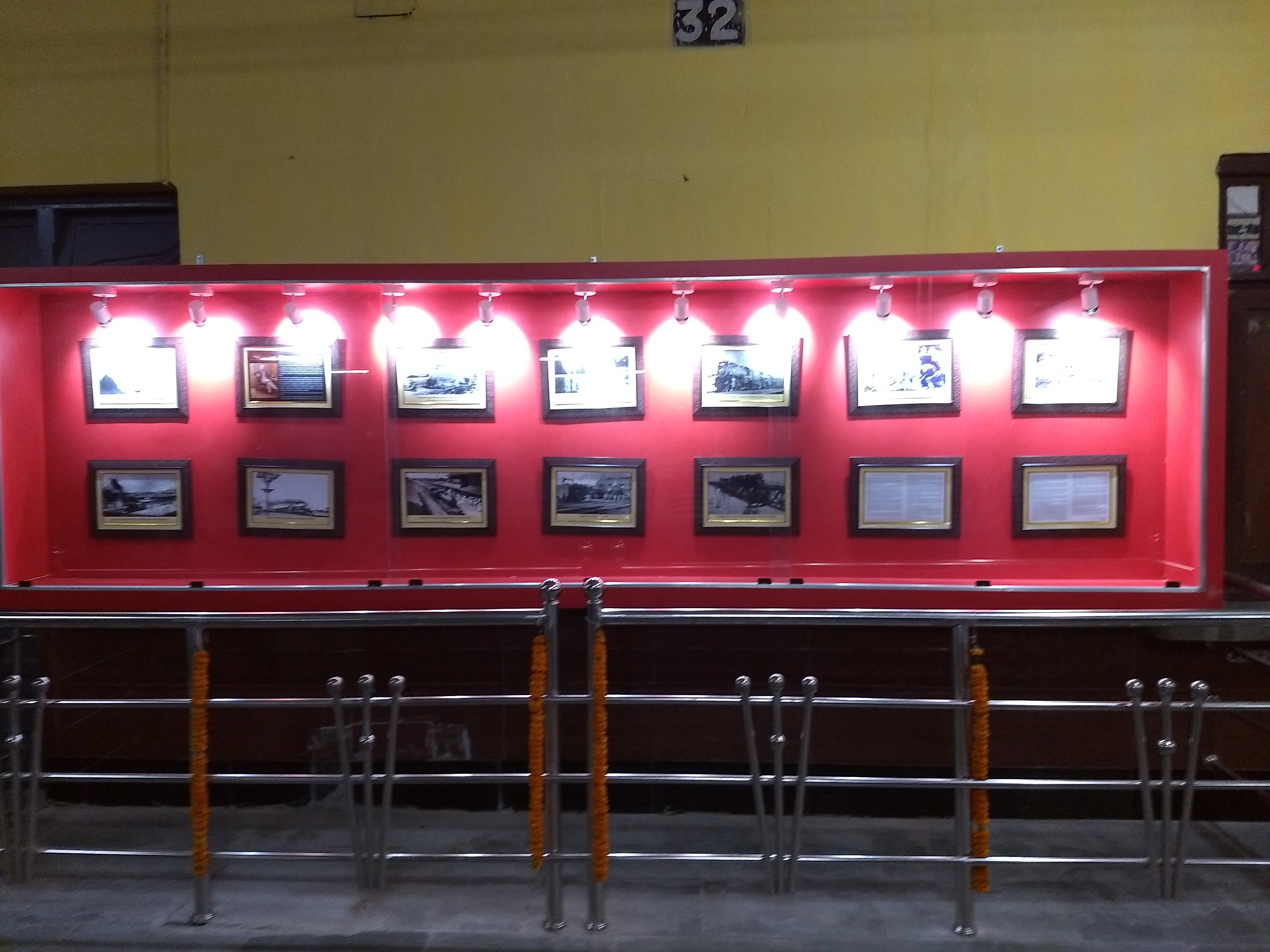

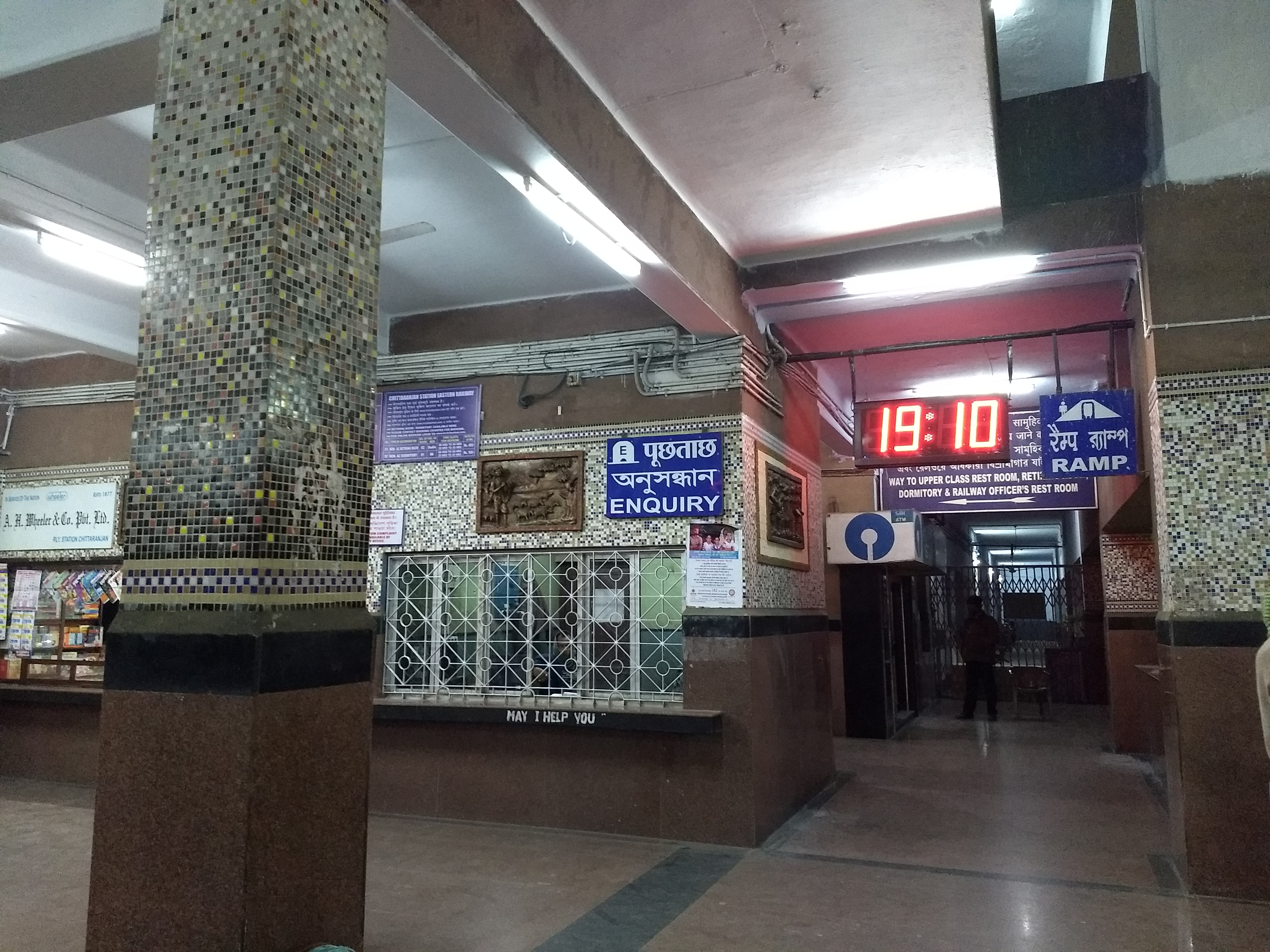

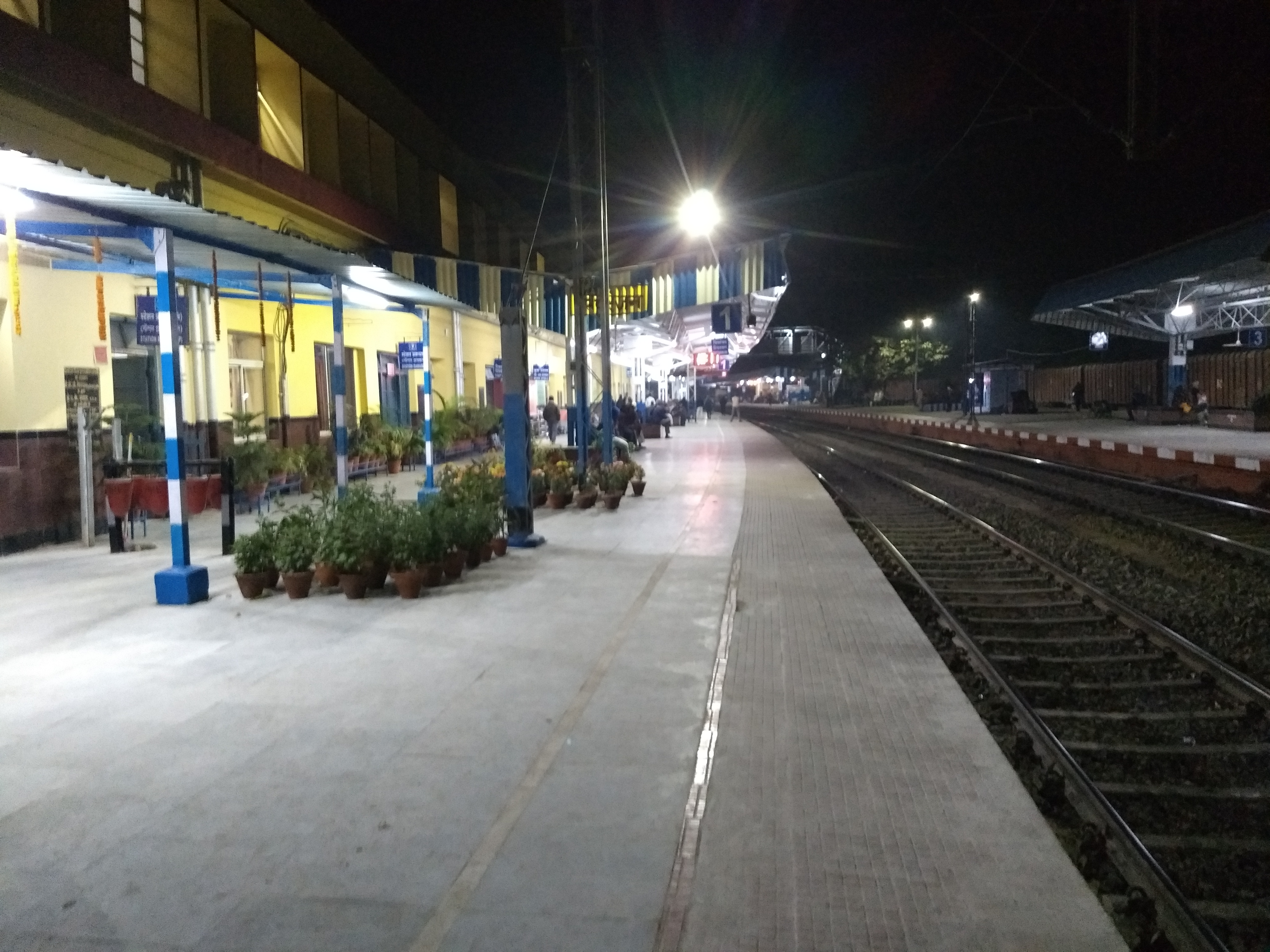

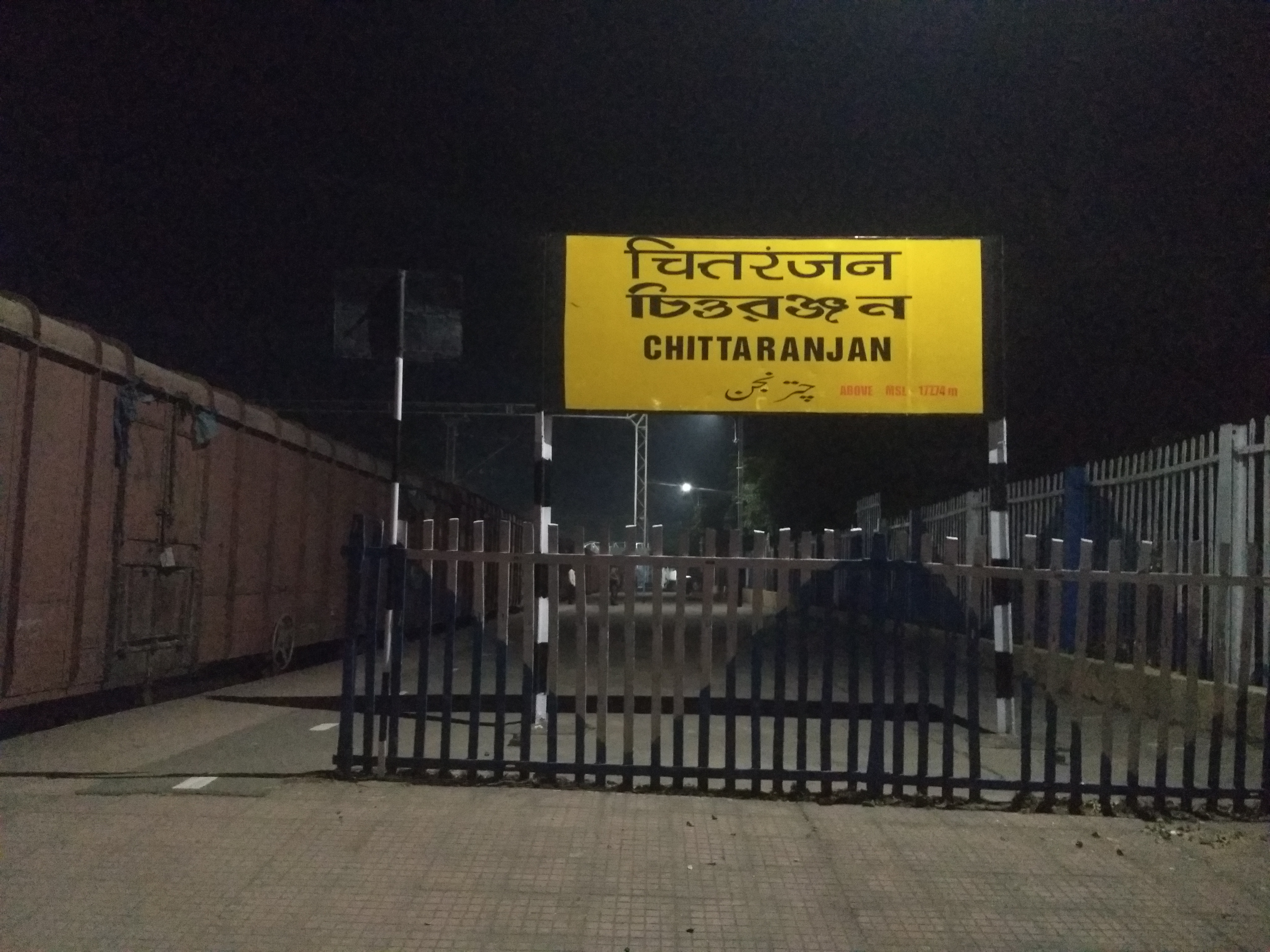
