= Narayanpur, Kailali =

Narayanpur, Seti नारायणपुर
- Village development committee
- Location in Nepal
- Coordinates: 28.47°N 81.08°E
- Country: Nepal
- Province: Sudurpashchim Province
- District: Kailali District

Population (1991)
  - Total: 9,091
- Time zone: UTC+5:45 (Nepal Time)

Narayanpur, Kailali is a village development committee in Kailali District in Sudurpashchim Province of western Nepal. At the time of the 1991 Nepal census it had a population of 9091 living in 1346 individual households.
