= Narayanpur, Manjhi block =

Narayanpur is a village in Manjhi block, Saran district of Bihar, India. As of the 2011 Census of India, it had a population of 586 across 79 households.
