= Narayanpur, Taraiya block =

Coordinates: 25°52′25″N 84°58′40″E

Narayanpur is a village in Taraiya block, Saran district of Bihar, India. As of the 2011 Census of India, it had a population of 6,253 across 1053 households.
