= Narayanpur (234040) =

Village in Bihar

Narayanpur is a village in Parsa block, Saran district of Bihar, India. As of the 2011 Census of India, it had a population of 1,216 across 179 households.
