= Narayanapur, Ranga Reddy =

Narayanapur
- Village
- Country: India
- State: Andhra Pradesh

Languages
  - Official: Telugu
- Time zone: UTC+5:30 (IST)
- Telephone code: 040
- Vehicle registration: AP 26 X XXXX
- Sex ratio: 1:1(approx) ♂/♀

Naraynapur is a village in Rangareddy district n Andhra Pradesh, India. It falls under Shamirpet mandal.
