= Narayanpur, Kashmir =

Narayanpur
- hamlet
- Location in Jammu and Kashmir, India Narayanpur (India)
- Coordinates: 32°28′47″N 74°52′51″E
- Country: India
- State: Jammu and Kashmir
- District: Jammu
- Elevation: 285 m (935 ft)

Population (2011)
  - Total: >100

Languages
  - Official: Urdu
- Time zone: UTC+5:30 (IST)
- Vehicle registration: JK

Narayanpur is a hamlet in Jammu district in the union territory of Jammu and Kashmir, India. It is located less than a kilometer north of the India-Pakistan cease-fire line.
