= Narayanpur, Rapti =

Narayanpur, Dang नारायणपुर
- City
- Location in Nepal
- Coordinates: 28.04°N 82.42°E
- Country: Nepal
- Province: Lumbini Province
- District: Dang Deukhuri District

Population (1991)
  - Total: 8,646
- Time zone: UTC+5:45 (Nepal Time)
- Postal code: 22400

Narayanpur is a town and Village Development Committee in Dang Deokhuri District in Lumbini Province of south-western Nepal. At the time of the 1991 Nepal census it had a population of 8,646 persons living in 1143 individual households. It lies 7 km south of Ghorahi.
