= Jamtara College =

Undergraduate college affiliated to Sido Kanhu Murmu University

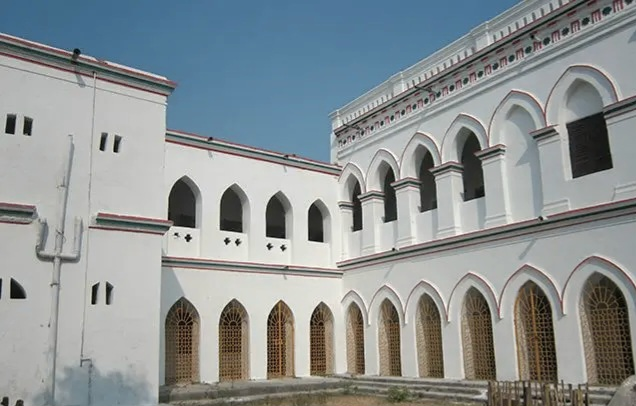
- Type: Undergraduate College
- Established: 1961; 65 years ago
- Accreditation: NAAC
- Affiliations: Sido Kanhu Murmu University
- Principal: Koushal Kumar
- Location: Jamtara, Jharkhand, India; 23.9577°N 86.8060°E
- Campus: Urban
- Website: jamtaracollege.ac.in
- Location within Jharkhand Location within India

Jamtara College, established in 1961, is a Constituent degree college located in Jamtara, Jharkhand. It offers undergraduate courses in arts, commerce and sciences. It is affiliated to Sido Kanhu Murmu University. The college is recognized under section 2(f)and 12(B) of UGC Act and is getting financial assistance for developing infrastructure facilities.

Initially, the college was affiliated on 6 January 1967 to Bhagalpur University (the present Tilka Manjhi Bhagalpur University) of undivided Bihar, and recognised as a constituent unit on 10 December 1980 by the State Government. The Sido Kanhu Murmu University was established on 10 January 1992 by an Act in the Bihar Legislative Assembly. The university was established by amending the Bihar State Universities Act 1976 (Bihar Act 23/1976) on 10 January 1992. The amendment primarily changed the jurisdiction of the Bhagalpur University by bifurcating the six districts of Santhal Parganas which now came under the jurisdiction of the new university; and needless to say, Jamtara College became a constituent unit of this university. After the division of Bihar on 15 November 2000, Jamtara College with its parent University came under administrative jurisdiction of the state of Jharkhand.

The college was established in 1961 having its accommodation in a small room in the then subdivision of Jamtara (now a full-fledged district) with its district headquarter at Dumka. Source has it that the College was also housed later on for years in the JBC+2 School, Jamtara. Ultimately, when the college got its affiliation on 1 June 1967 it was shifted to its own building donated by the legal heirs of Hetampur Estate of Burdwan, West Bengal. The college was also recognized under section 2f and 12B of UGC Act.

With the passage of time, the college added two additional buildings: Science Block Phase-I and Phase-II in order to augment the science faculty and provide better laboratory and lecture theatre. This is expected to be operational very soon. A separate Library Building has been approved by HRDD, Govt. Jharkhand and its construction will be started very soon as the related proceeding for it is in advance stage.

Besides the main campus, the college has additional land mass of 20 acres with ST Welfare Hostel and proposed B.Ed College building at village, Chakri, Jamtara, 2 km from the main college campus. This land was settled in favour of the college in the year by SDO Jamtara.

The proposed Examination Hall with an area of 10,000 sq ft., boys and girls common rooms, computer centre, vehicle and cycle parking shed with financial assistance of RUSA will further enrich existing facility of the college.

== Accreditation ==
Jamtara College is under process of accreditation by the National Assessment and Accreditation Council.
