= Jamtara Assembly constituency =

Assembly constituency in Jharkhand, India

Jamtara
- Constituency No. 9 for the Jharkhand Legislative Assembly

Constituency details
- Country: India
- Region: East India
- State: Jharkhand
- District: Jamtara
- Lok Sabha constituency: Dumka
- Established: 2000
- Total electors: 2,77,191
- Reservation: None

Member of Legislative Assembly
- 6th Jharkhand Legislative Assembly
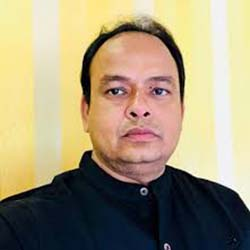
- Incumbent Irfan Ansari
- Party: INC
- Alliance: MGB
- Elected year: 2024

Jamtara is an assembly constituency in the Indian state of Jharkhand.

== Overview ==
Jamtara Assembly constituency covers: Jamtara Police Station (excluding Karmatanr, Sahajpur, Pindari, Lakhanpur, Rataniya, Rampurbhitra and Kajra gram panchayats) and Narayanpur Police Station in Jamtara district.

Jamtara Assembly constituency is part of Dumka (Lok Sabha constituency).

== Members of Legislative Assembly ==
Election	Member	Party
Bihar Legislative Assembly
1952	Shatrughan Besra	Jharkhand Party
1957	Shatrughan Besra	Jharkhand Party
1962	Kali Prasad Singh	Swatantra Party
1967	Shatrughan Besra	Communist Party of India
1969	Kali Prasad Singh	Indian National Congress
1972	Durga Prasad Singh	Indian National Congress
1977	Durga Prasad Singh	Indian National Congress
1980	Arun Kumar Bose	Communist Party of India
1985	Md. Furqan Ansari	Indian National Congress
1990	Md. Furqan Ansari	Indian National Congress
1995	Md. Furqan Ansari	Indian National Congress
2000	Md. Furqan Ansari	Indian National Congress
Jharkhand Legislative Assembly
2005	Bishnu Prased Bhaiya	Bharatiya Janata Party
2009★	Shibu Soren	Jharkhand Mukti Morcha
2009	Bishnu Prased Bhaiya	Jharkhand Mukti Morcha
2014	Irfan Ansari	Indian National Congress
2019	Irfan Ansari	Indian National Congress
2024	Irfan Ansari	Indian National Congress

== Election results ==
=== Assembly Election 2024 ===
2024 Jharkhand Legislative Assembly election: Jamtara
Party	Candidate	Votes	%	±%
INC	Irfan Ansari	133,266	54.62%	▲1.51
BJP	Sita Soren	89,590	36.72%	▲1.84
JLKM	Tarun Ku. Gupta	5,151	2.11%	New
CPI(M)	Lakhan Lal Mandal	3,553	1.46%	New
Independent	Sujit Das	2,487	1.02%	New
BSP	Arif Ansari	1,812	0.74%	New
NOTA	None of the Above	2,849	1.17%	▼0.26
Margin of victory		43,676	17.90%	▼0.34
Turnout		2,44,009	75.93%	▼0.72
Registered electors		3,21,367		▲15.94
INC hold		Swing	▲1.51	

=== Assembly Election 2019 ===
2019 Jharkhand Legislative Assembly election: Jamtara
Party	Candidate	Votes	%	±%
INC	Irfan Ansari	112,829	53.11%	▲17.94
BJP	Birendra Mandal	74,088	34.87%	▲4.46
Independent	Tarun Kumar Gupta	6,219	2.93%	New
AJSU	Chameli Devi	4,780	2.25%	New
Independent	Sanjay Pahan	3,407	1.60%	New
JVM(P)	Abdul Mannan Ansari	1,646	0.77%	New
Independent	Md. Anwar Ansari	1,549	0.73%	New
NOTA	Nota	3,031	1.43%	▼0.66
Margin of victory		38,741	18.24%	▲13.47
Turnout		2,12,451	76.64%	▼1.98
Registered electors		2,77,191		▲13.59
INC hold		Swing	▲17.94	

=== Assembly Election 2014 ===
2014 Jharkhand Legislative Assembly election: Jamtara
Party	Candidate	Votes	%	±%
INC	Irfan Ansari	67,486	35.17%	▼1.9
BJP	Birendra Mandal	58,349	30.41%	▲23.56
JMM	Bishnu Prasad Bhaiya	52,029	27.12%	▼19.48
BSP	Sukhdev Ray	2,293	1.20%	▼0.05
Independent	Rakesh Kumar Lal	1,867	0.97%	New
AITC	Nandgopal Singh	1,321	0.69%	New
Independent	Md. Mustak	1,128	0.59%	New
NOTA	None of the Above	3,996	2.08%	New
Margin of victory		9,137	4.76%	▼9.97
Turnout		1,91,876	78.63%	▲22.92
Registered electors		2,44,034		▲13.57
INC gain from JMM		Swing	▼0.47	

=== Assembly Election 2009 ===
2009 Jharkhand Legislative Assembly election: Jamtara
Party	Candidate	Votes	%	±%
JMM	Bishnu Prasad Bhaiya	62,795	46.60%	▲10.96
INC	Furqan Ansari	49,952	37.07%	New
BJP	Baby Sarkar	9,228	6.85%	▼14.06
RJD	Saryu Pd. Mandal	2,580	1.91%	New
Independent	Lakhindar Murmu	1,827	1.36%	New
BSP	Anwar Hussen	1,552	1.15%	▼2.95
Independent	Buddha Deb Marandi	1,494	1.11%	New
Margin of victory		12,843	9.53%	▲6.77
Turnout		1,34,741	62.21%	▲1.94
Registered electors		2,16,606		▲3.14
JMM gain from BJP		Swing	▲7.59	

=== Assembly By-election 2009 ===
2009 Jharkhand Legislative Assembly by-election: Jamtara
Party	Candidate	Votes	%	±%
JMM	Sibhu Soran	42,668	35.64%	New
BJP	Tarun Kumar Gupta	25,036	20.91%	▼18.11
JVM(P)	Abbu Talib Ansari	13,494	11.27%	New
Independent	Virendar Mandal	8,686	7.26%	New
JD	Md. Riyaz Ahmed	6,909	5.77%	New
BSP	Amar Kumar Dubey	4,907	4.10%	▲0.38
Independent	Mohan Lal Mandal	3,821	3.19%	New
Margin of victory		17,632	14.73%	▲5.20
Turnout		1,19,705	55.71%	▼6.49
Registered electors		2,14,867		▼0.80
JMM hold		Swing	▼10.96	

=== Assembly Election 2005 ===
2005 Jharkhand Legislative Assembly election: Jamtara
Party	Candidate	Votes	%	±%
BJP	Bishnu Prasad Bhaiya	49,387	39.02%	▲7.30
INC	Irfan Ansari	45,895	36.26%	▼3.23
Independent	Birendra Mandal	5,049	3.99%	New
BSP	Siraj Ansari	4,706	3.72%	New
AJSU	Sunil Kumar Hansda	4,038	3.19%	New
Independent	Babu Lal Marandi	3,034	2.40%	New
Independent	Dulal Roy	2,885	2.28%	New
Margin of victory		3,492	2.76%	▼5.01
Turnout		1,26,575	60.27%	▼3.07
Registered electors		2,10,012		▲25.06
BJP gain from INC		Swing	▼0.47	

=== Assembly Election 2000 ===
2000 Bihar Legislative Assembly election: Jamtara
Party	Candidate	Votes	%	±%
INC	Furqan Ansari	42,002	39.49%	New
BJP	Bishnu Prasad Bhaiya	33,738	31.72%	New
JMM	Shyam Lal Hembram	23,541	22.13%	New
CPI(M)	Jay Prakash Mandal	3,578	3.36%	New
CPI	Chintamani Mandal	1,984	1.87%	New
SP	Asit Kumar Mandal	861	0.81%	New
Independent	Shiv Shankar Lal Murmu	667	0.63%	New
Margin of victory		8,264	7.77%	
Turnout		1,06,371	64.06%	
Registered electors		1,67,935		
INC win (new seat)				

== See also ==
- Jamtara block
- Narayanpur block
- List of states of India by type of legislature
