= Nala Assembly constituency =

Nala
- Constituency No. 8 for the Jharkhand Legislative Assembly

Constituency details
- Country: India
- Region: East India
- State: Jharkhand
- District: Jamtara
- Lok Sabha constituency: Dumka
- Established: 2000
- Total electors: 2,23,179
- Reservation: None

Member of Legislative Assembly
- 5th Jharkhand Legislative Assembly
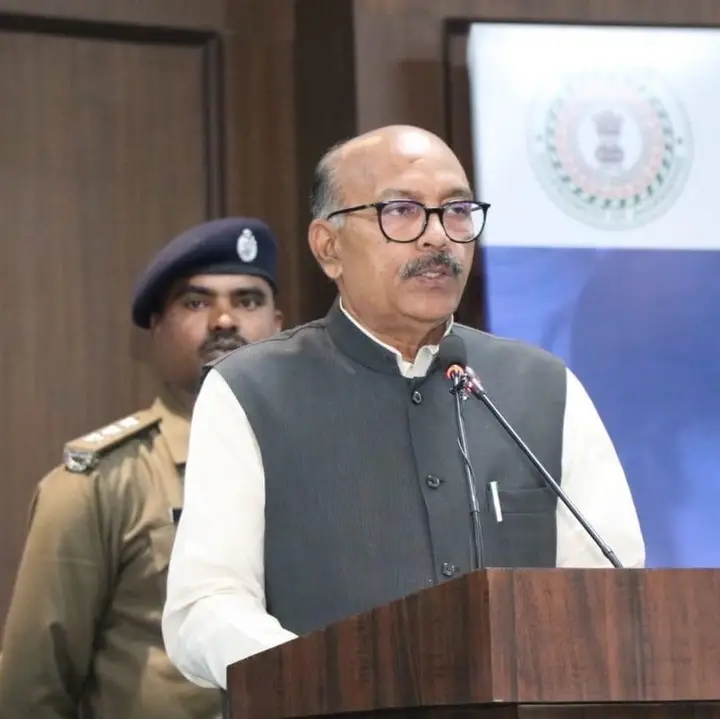
- Incumbent Rabindra Nath Mahato
- Party: JMM
- Alliance: MGB
- Elected year: 2024

Nala Assembly constituency is an assembly constituency in the Indian state of Jharkhand.

== Overview ==
Nala Assembly constituency covers: Nala and Kundahit Police Stations in Jamtara district. There are 242 towns and villages in Nala Block of Jamtara district, Jharkhand.

Nala Assembly constituency is part of Dumka (Lok Sabha constituency).

== Members of Legislative Assembly ==
Election	Member	Party
Bihar Legislative Assembly
Before 1967: Constituency did not exist
1967	Bisheswar Khan	Communist Party of India
1969	Bisheswar Khan	Communist Party of India
1972	Bisheswar Khan	Communist Party of India
1977	Bisheswar Khan	Communist Party of India
1980	Bisheswar Khan	Communist Party of India
1985	Bisheswar Khan	Communist Party of India
1990	Rajkumari Himmatsinghka	Indian National Congress
1995	Bisheswar Khan	Communist Party of India
2000	Bisheswar Khan	Communist Party of India
Jharkhand Legislative Assembly
2005	Rabindra Nath Mahato	Jharkhand Mukti Morcha
2009	Satyanand Jha	Bharatiya Janata Party
2014	Rabindra Nath Mahato	Jharkhand Mukti Morcha
2019	Rabindra Nath Mahato	Jharkhand Mukti Morcha
2024	Rabindra Nath Mahato	Jharkhand Mukti Morcha

== Election results ==
=== Assembly election 2024 ===
2024 Jharkhand Legislative Assembly election: Nala
Party	Candidate	Votes	%	±%
JMM	Rabindra Nath Mahato	92,702	47.09%	▲12.12
BJP	Madhav Chandra Mahato	82,219	41.76%	▲8.80
CPI	Kanai Chandra Malpaharia	6,111	3.10%	▼9.09
Independent	Santosh Hembram	4,371	2.22%	New
Independent	Shanti Gopal Mahato	3,078	1.56%	New
Independent	Sujit Kumar Sarkar	1,494	0.76%	New
JLKM	Raghubir Yadav	1,174	0.60%	New
NOTA	None of the Above	1,626	0.83%	▲0.48
Margin of victory		10,483	5.32%	▲3.32
Turnout		1,96,876	81.13%	▲2.51
Registered electors		2,42,669		▲8.73
JMM hold		Swing	▲12.12	

=== Assembly election 2019 ===
2019 Jharkhand Legislative Assembly election: Nala
Party	Candidate	Votes	%	±%
JMM	Rabindra Nath Mahato	61,356	34.97%	▲1.28
BJP	Satyanand Jha	57,836	32.96%	▲3.48
CPI	Kanai Chandra Malpaharia	21,394	12.19%	▲0.54
AJSU	Madhav Chandra Mahto	16,778	9.56%	New
JVM(P)	Pushpa Soren	2,592	1.48%	▼11.11
LJP	Amit Kumar Chalak	2,020	1.15%	New
Independent	Santosh Hembram	1,769	1.01%	New
NOTA	None of the Above	601	0.34%	▼0.25
Margin of victory		3,520	2.01%	▼2.20
Turnout		1,75,462	78.62%	▼2.00
Registered electors		2,23,179		▲8.00
JMM hold		Swing	▲1.28	

=== Assembly Election 2014 ===
2014 Jharkhand Legislative Assembly election: Nala
Party	Candidate	Votes	%	±%
JMM	Rabindra Nath Mahato	56,131	33.69%	▲5.56
BJP	Satyanand Jha	49,116	29.48%	▼1.90
JVM(P)	Madhav Chandra Mahto	20,970	12.59%	New
CPI	Kanai Chandra Malpaharia	19,416	11.65%	▼4.00
Independent	Tapas Chatarjee	3,388	2.03%	New
CPI(ML)L	Sushil Mohali	2,019	1.21%	New
RJD	Ashok Majee	1,865	1.12%	New
NOTA	None of the Above	991	0.59%	New
Margin of victory		7,015	4.21%	▲0.96
Turnout		1,66,601	80.62%	▲14.20
Registered electors		2,06,648		▲12.99
JMM gain from BJP		Swing	▲2.31	

=== Assembly Election 2009 ===
2009 Jharkhand Legislative Assembly election: Nala
Party	Candidate	Votes	%	±%
BJP	Satyanand Jha	38,119	31.38%	▲2.47
JMM	Rabindra Nath Mahato	34,171	28.13%	▼1.87
CPI	Kanai Chandra Malpaharia	19,014	15.65%	▼8.17
INC	Amita Rakshit	10,048	8.27%	New
AJSU	Praveen Prabhakar	2,475	2.04%	New
Independent	Gour Chandra Yadav	2,246	1.85%	New
AITC	Milan Kumar Ghoshol	1,837	1.51%	New
Margin of victory		3,948	3.25%	▲2.16
Turnout		1,21,478	66.42%	▲9.19
Registered electors		1,82,885		▲1.80
BJP gain from JMM		Swing	▲1.38	

=== Assembly Election 2005 ===
2005 Jharkhand Legislative Assembly election: Nala
Party	Candidate	Votes	%	±%
JMM	Rabindra Nath Mahato	30,847	30.00%	▲7.43
BJP	Satyanand Jha	29,725	28.91%	▲10.17
CPI	Bisheswar Khan	24,493	23.82%	▲0.52
Independent	Sunil Kumar Roy	2,916	2.84%	New
Independent	Praveen Prabhakar	2,866	2.79%	New
BSP	Anjana Ghosh	1,656	1.61%	New
Jharkhand Vikas Dal	Digumber Pd. Sah	1,597	1.55%	New
Margin of victory		1,122	1.09%	▲0.36
Turnout		1,02,827	57.24%	▲3.72
Registered electors		1,79,650		▲10.22
JMM gain from CPI		Swing	▲6.70	

=== Assembly Election 2000 ===
2000 Bihar Legislative Assembly election: Nala
Party	Candidate	Votes	%	±%
CPI	Bisheswar Khan	20,324	23.30%	New
JMM	Rabindra Nath Mahato	19,690	22.57%	New
INC	Raj Kumari Himmat Singhko	17,752	20.35%	New
BJP	Satyanand Jha	16,349	18.74%	New
CPI(ML)L	Shibadas Soren	4,372	5.01%	New
Independent	Digumber Pd. Sah	3,564	4.09%	New
JD(U)	Bama Yadav	2,302	2.64%	New
Margin of victory		634	0.73%	
Turnout		87,230	54.13%	
Registered electors		1,62,991		
CPI win (new seat)				

== See also ==
- Nala block
- Kundhit block
- List of states of India by type of legislature
