= Jamtara =

City in Jharkhand, India

- City/municipality
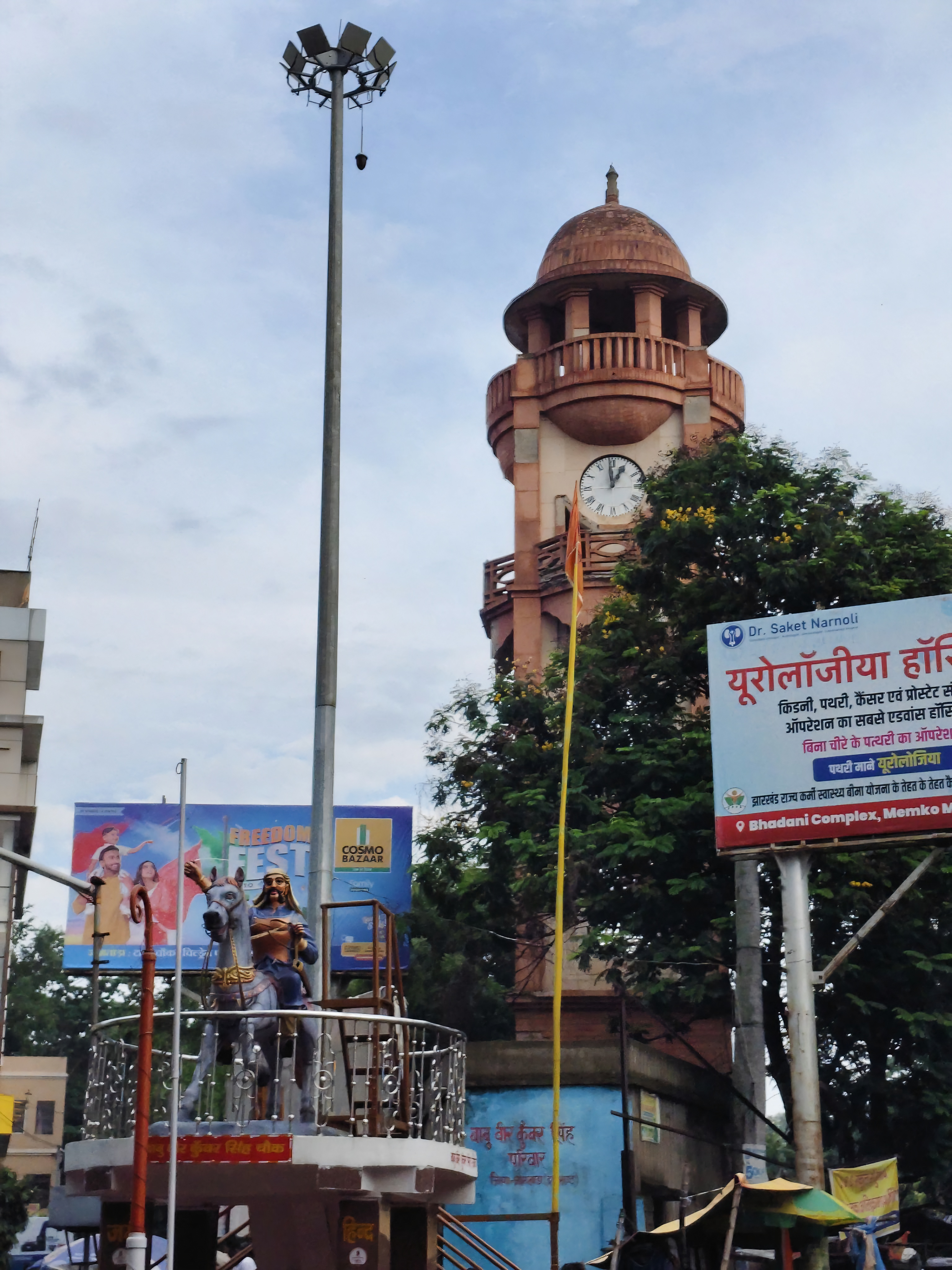
- Clock tower with statue of Veer Kunwar Singh on horseback

- Location in Jharkhand, India Jamtara (India)
- Coordinates: 23.9633°N 86.8014°E
- Country: India
- State: Jharkhand
- District: Jamtara

Area
  - Total: 1,802 km^{2} (696 sq mi)
- Elevation: 155 m (509 ft)

Population (2011)
  - Total: 90,426
  - Density: 439/km^{2} (1,140/sq mi)

Languages (* for language details, see Jamtara block#Language and religion)
  - Official: Hindi; Urdu
- Time zone: UTC+5:30 (IST)
- PIN: 815351
- Telephone code: 06433
- Vehicle registration: JH-21
- Sex ratio: 959 ♂/♀
- Website: jamtara.nic.in

Jamtara is a city and a notified area in the Jamtara Sadar subdivision of the Jamtara district in the Indian state of Jharkhand. It is the headquarters of the eponymous district, subdivision, and community development block.

Jamtara is nicknamed the "phishing capital of India", due to a history of pan-Indian scam incidents originating there.

== Geography ==
Cities, towns, and locations in the Deoghar, Dumka, and Jamtara districts of Santhal Pargana Division
M: municipality, CT: census town, R: rural/urban centre, D: dam,
Owing to space constraints on this map, actual locations on a larger map may vary slightly.

=== Location ===
Jamtara is located at 23.95°N 86.8°E, 250 km from Ranchi, the state capital, and 54 km from Dhanbad. It has an area of 1,801 km^{2} and an average elevation of 155 metres (508 feet).

== Education ==
Educational institutions in Jamtara include Edwards English School.

== Demographics ==
In the 2011 Indian census, the latest to date, Jamtara had a population of 29,415, composed of 89% Hindus and 10% Muslims. Males constituted 52% of the population and females 48%. Jamtara had an average literacy rate of 63.73%, lower than the national average of 74.4%; male literacy was 76.85% and female 50.08%. 13% of the population was under 6 years of age.

=== Languages ===
Languages spoken in Jamtara (2011)
1. Bengali (43.2%)
2. Hindi (28.6%)
3. Khortha (15.5%)
4. Santali (3.53%)
5. Others (9.17%)

According to the 2011 census, Bengali was the most-spoken language in Jamtara, with 12,713 speakers, followed by Hindi at 8,412, Khortha at 4,553, and Santali at 1,038.

== Phishing industry ==
Since the 2010s, Jamtara has been known as the "phishing capital of India", due to the proliferation of cybercrime operations centred there. Police from different Indian states began investigating these operations in 2015, making several arrests, though conviction rates were low, and the illicit industry was hardly affected. Between April 2015 and March 2017, police from 12 Indian states reportedly made 23 journeys to Jamtara.

The 2020 Netflix crime drama series Jamtara – Sabka Number Ayega is a fictionalized look at the eponymous city's scam operations.
