= Jamtara district =

District of Jharkhand, India

- District of Jharkhand
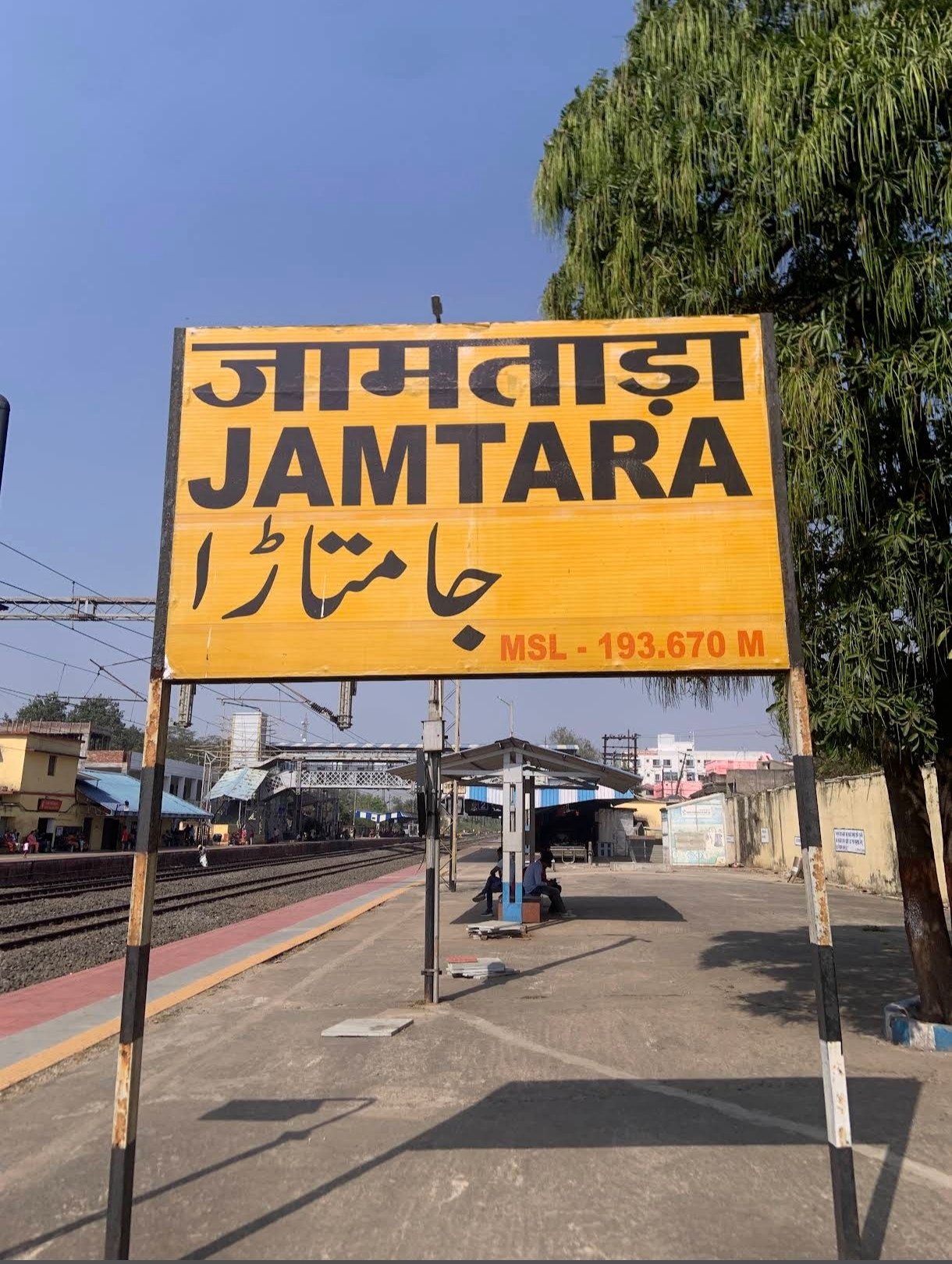
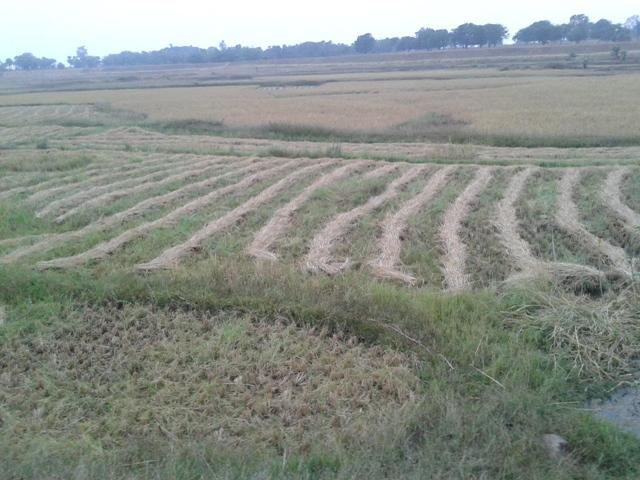
- Jamtara railway station Field in Jamtara district
- Interactive map of Jamtara district
- Coordinates (Jamtara): 23°57′36″N 86°48′00″E
- Country: India
- State: Jharkhand
- Division: Santal Pargana
- Headquarters: Jamtara

Government
  - Lok Sabha constituencies: 1. Dumka (shared with Dumka district)
  - Vidhan Sabha constituencies: 2

Area
  - Total: 1,801.98 km^{2} (695.75 sq mi)

Population (2011)
  - Total: 791,042
  - Density: 438.985/km^{2} (1,136.97/sq mi)

Demographics
  - Literacy: 64.59%
  - Sex ratio: 959
- Time zone: UTC+05:30 (IST)
- Website: jamtara.nic.in

Jamtara district is one of the twenty-four districts of Jharkhand state in eastern India. Jamtara town is the administrative headquarters of this district. The district is situated between 23°10′ and 24°05′ north latitudes and 86°30′ and 87°15′ east longitudes.

== Administration ==
=== Blocks/Mandals ===
Jamtara district consists of 06 Blocks. The following are the list of the Blocks in Jamtara district:

1. Narayanpur
2. Karmatanr
3. Jamtara
4. Fatehpur
5. Nala
6. Kundhit.

== Demographics ==
Historical population
Year	Pop.	±%
1901	225,405	—
1911	234,519	+4.0%
1921	224,059	−4.5%
1931	256,100	+14.3%
1941	279,114	+9.0%
1951	290,056	+3.9%
1961	324,745	+12.0%
1971	377,711	+16.3%
1981	435,284	+15.2%
1991	544,874	+25.2%
2001	653,081	+19.9%
2011	791,042	+21.1%
Source: Census of India

Religion in Jamtara district (2011)
Religion	Percent
Hinduism	69.60%
Islam	20.78%
Sarna	8.67%
Christianity	0.56%
Other or not stated	0.39%

According to the 2011 census Jamtara district has a population of 791,042, roughly equal to the nation of Comoros or the US state of South Dakota. This gives it a ranking of 486th in India (out of a total of 640). The district has a population density of 439 inhabitants per square kilometre (1,140/sq mi). Its population growth rate over the decade 2001-2011 was 21%. Jamtara has a sex ratio of 959 females for every 1000 males, and a literacy rate of 64.59%. 9.58% of the population lives in urban areas. Scheduled Castes and Scheduled Tribes make up 9.21% and 30.40% of the population respectively.

Languages of Jamtara district (2011)
1. Bengali (30.2%)
2. Santali (29.1%)
3. Khortha (27.9%)
4. Hindi (5.92%)
5. Urdu (3.61%)
6. Magahi (1.25%)
7. Others (2.01%)

At the time of the 2011 Census of India, 30.18% of the population spoke Bengali, 29.10% Santali, 27.93% Khortha, 5.92% Hindi, 3.61% Urdu and 1.25% Magahi as their first language.

== Economy ==
In 2006 the Indian government named Jamtara one of the country's 250 most backward districts (out of a total of 640). It is one of the 21 districts in Jharkhand currently receiving funds from the Backward Regions Grant Fund Programme (BRGF).

== Politics ==
There are three Vidhan Sabha constituencies in the district: Nala, Jamtara and Sarath (shared with Deoghar district). All three constituencies are part of Dumka Lok Sabha constituency.

District	No.	Constituency	Name	Party		Alliance	Remarks	Jamtara	8	Nala	Rabindra Nath Mahato	Speaker
9	Jamtara	Irfan Ansari		INC	Cabinet minister			Jamtara				

== See also ==
- Districts of Jharkhand
