= C. P. Singh (Indian politician) =

Indian politician

Chandreshwar Prasad Singh
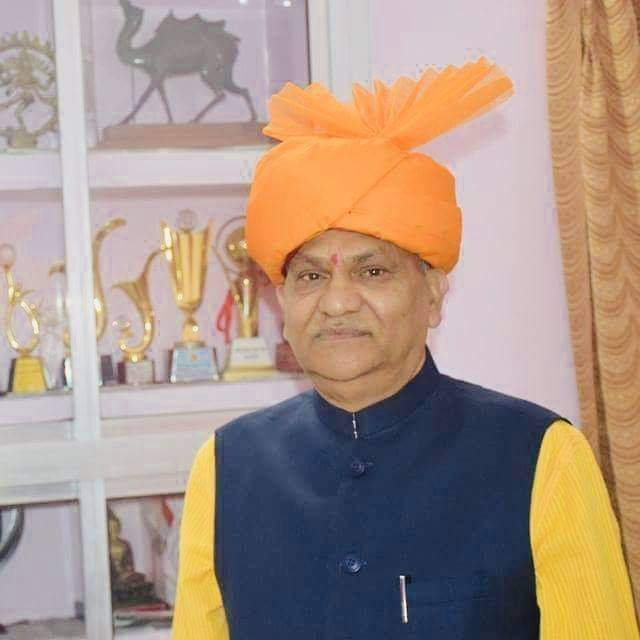

Minister of Urban Development & Housing Government of Jharkhand
- In office 28 December 2014 – 29 December 2019
- Chief Minister: Raghubar Das

Minister of Parliamentary Affairs Government of Jharkhand
- In office 28 December 2014 – 29 December 2019
- Chief Minister: Raghubar Das
- Succeeded by: Alamgir Alam

Speaker of the Jharkhand Legislative Assembly
- In office 6 January 2010 – 19 July 2013
- Preceded by: Alamgir Alam
- Succeeded by: Shashank Shekhar Bhokta

Member of Jharkhand Legislative Assembly
- Incumbent
- Assumed office 1996
- Preceded by: Yashwant Sinha
- Constituency: Ranchi

Personal details
- Born: 16 January 1956 (age 70) Naugarha, Bihar (now Jharkhand), India
- Party: Bharatiya Janata Party
- Occupation: Politician
- Website: https://cpsingh.in/index.php

Chandreshwar Prasad Singh, also known as C.P. Singh is an Indian Politician and a prominent leader of Bharatiya Janata Party, he has served as Minister of Urban Development, Transport, Parliamentary Affairs, Registration, Housing, Disaster Management & Civil Aviation in the Govt. of Jharkhand and was also Chairman of Jharkhand Legislative Assembly i.e. ‘Speaker’ from 2010-2013. He is member of Jharkhand legislative assembly from Capital City Ranchi for over decades, and is elected seven times in a row since 1996, more than any other BJP leader of Jharkhand.

== Early life and education ==
Singh was born to Rajeshwari Devi and Jaimohan Singh in Naugarha Village in district Palamu, Jharkhand. Born in a farmer family, He received his early education in Naugarha village till class 7th. After then, he moved to Ranchi for further education. He completed his secondary and higher secondary schooling from Marwari School. He got his graduation from Ranchi University in 1978 and enrolled in Chota Nagpur Law College. After accomplishing his law degree in 1982, he practiced law for 2 years.

== Early political life ==
During his graduation, he became a member of Akhil Bharatiya Vidhyarthi Parisad (known as ABVP) in 1973 and was involved in student movement during Indira Gandhi regime. Being district head of AVBP from 1973 to 1976, Singh led student protest against Congress government in JP movement and went to prison. He was kept in Hazaribagh jail from January 1976 to July 1976.

He joined Janta Party in 1978 but when Janta party got divided, he joined Bharatiya Janta Party in 1980. In his early tenure he served in youth wing of Bharatiya Janta Party and held positions within party like Ranchi District president and vice president of Youth Bharatiya Janta Yuva Morcha in Bihar from 1982 till 1996. He had been deeply engaged by Bharatiya Janta Party in electoral politics of Jharkhand.

Early Political Life
Year	Activity in electoral politics
1982	Vidhan Sabha in-charge in Lohardagga Parliament By Election
1983	Membership in-charge of Ranchi district
1984	Election Agent of Parliament election in Ranchi District
1989–1996	Election in charge of Bharatiya Janta Party from District Ranchi.

== Political career and image ==
Singh is seven consecutive term member of legislative assembly. He was elected as MLA from Ranchi in years 1996, 2000, 2005, 2009, 2014, 2019 and 2024. In legislative assembly, he held some of the places as member of government and as member of opposition. From 2000 to 2006, he was ‘Chief Whip’ of ruling party and from 2006 to 2009, he was Chief Whip of opposition party. In January 2010, he was elected as 4th Speaker of Legislative Assembly of Jharkhand, a constitutional position.

== Recognition ==
Limca Book of Records recognized efforts of Singh and therefore conferred award for Public Grievance Management System. When he received the award, "Jansewa Portal" was the only portal all across India to be started by Singh as an MLA to register complaints of citizens online and to set up a volunteer based grievance redressal system so that complainants could actually track status of their complaints on real time basis 24/7.
