= Naugarha =

- Location in Jharkhand, India Naugarha (India) Naugarha (Asia)
- Coordinates: 24.175°N 83.988°E
- Country: India
- State: Jharkhand
- District: Palamu

Government
  - Body: Gram panchayat

Area
  - Total: 129.24 ha (319.4 acres)

Population (2011)
  - Total: 814
  - Density: 630/km^{2} (1,630/sq mi)
- Time zone: UTC+5:30
- PIN: 822124
- Telephone code: 06584

Naugarha is a village in India, located in Bishrampur block of Palamu district, Jharkhand.

== Location and Administration ==
Naugarha is located in Bishrampur block of Palamu district, Jharkhand. The village is administered by Panjri Kalan Gram Panchayat.

The village cover approximately 129.24 Hectares

== Population ==
According to the 2011 Census, Naugarha had a population of 814 people living in 131 households. The population consisted of 410 males and 404 females, with sex ratio 985 females per 1,000 males. Children of 0–6 age group are 128 in the 2011 Census.

== Education ==
The reported literacy rate was approximately 62.16%. Village have a Middle school and a High school.
