= Akhisar =

- District and municipality
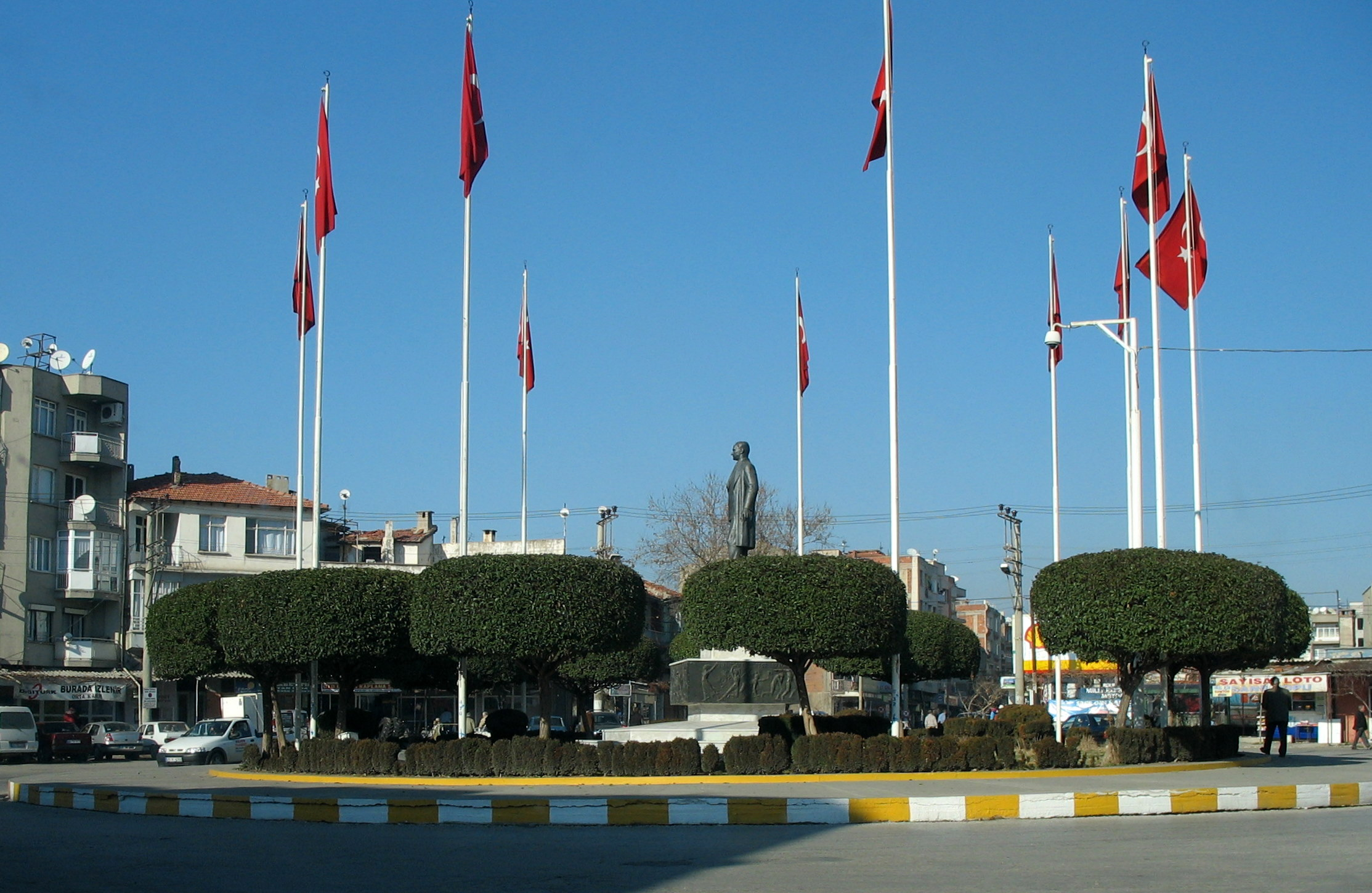
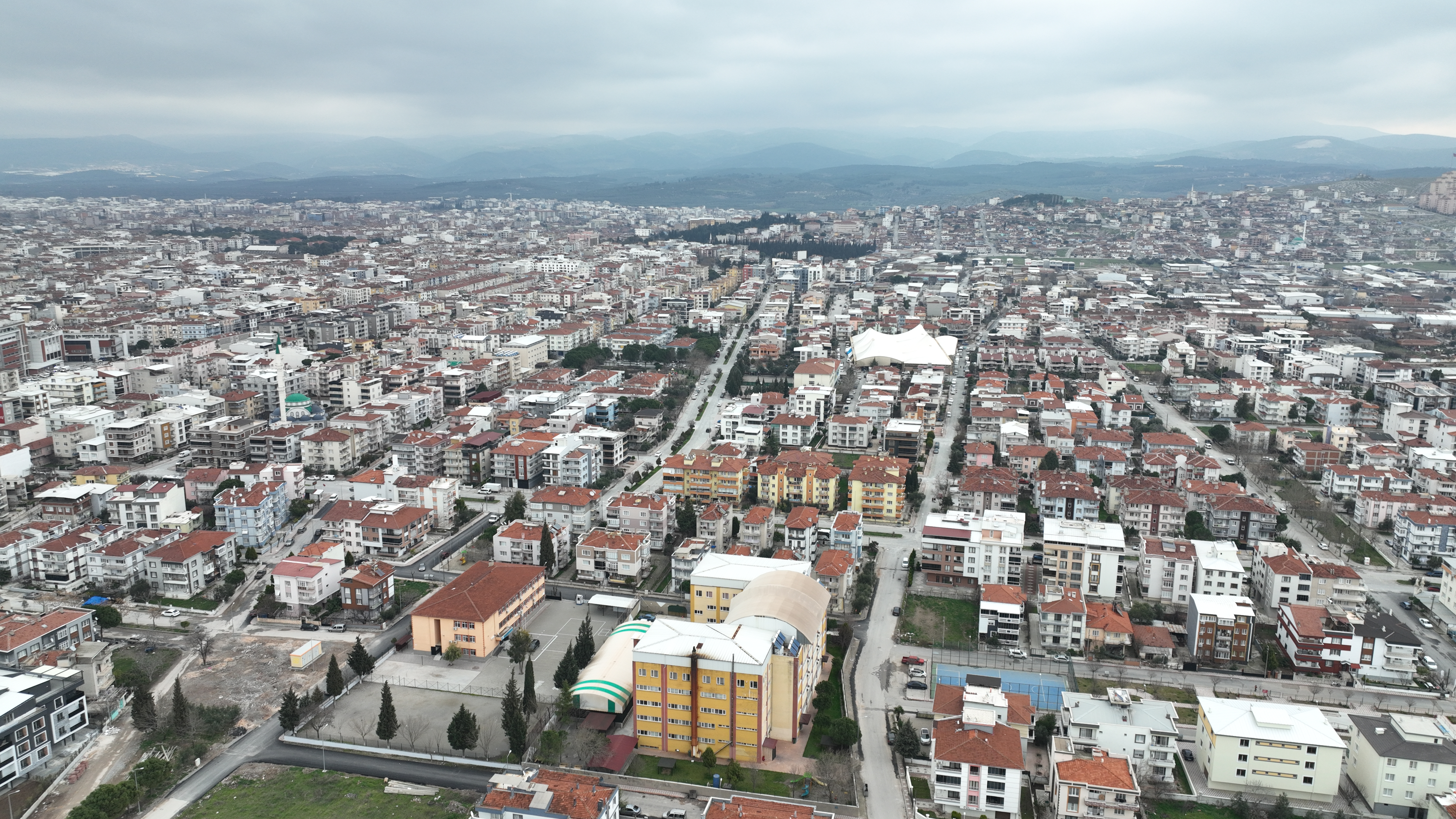
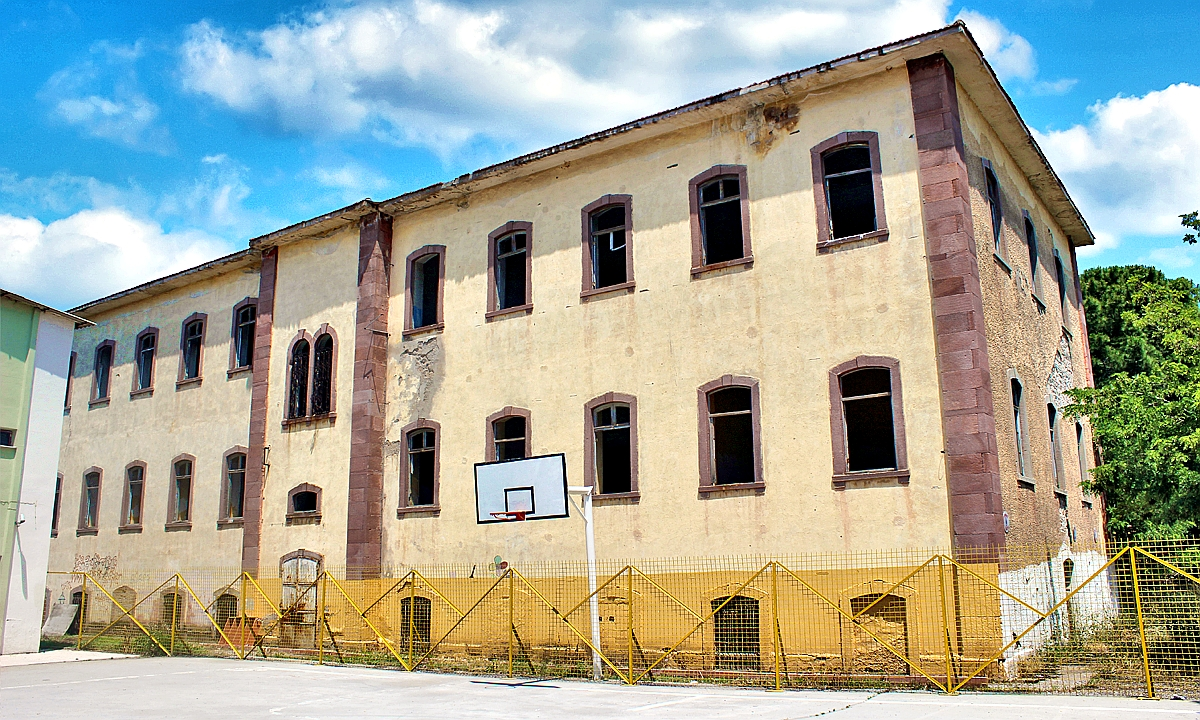
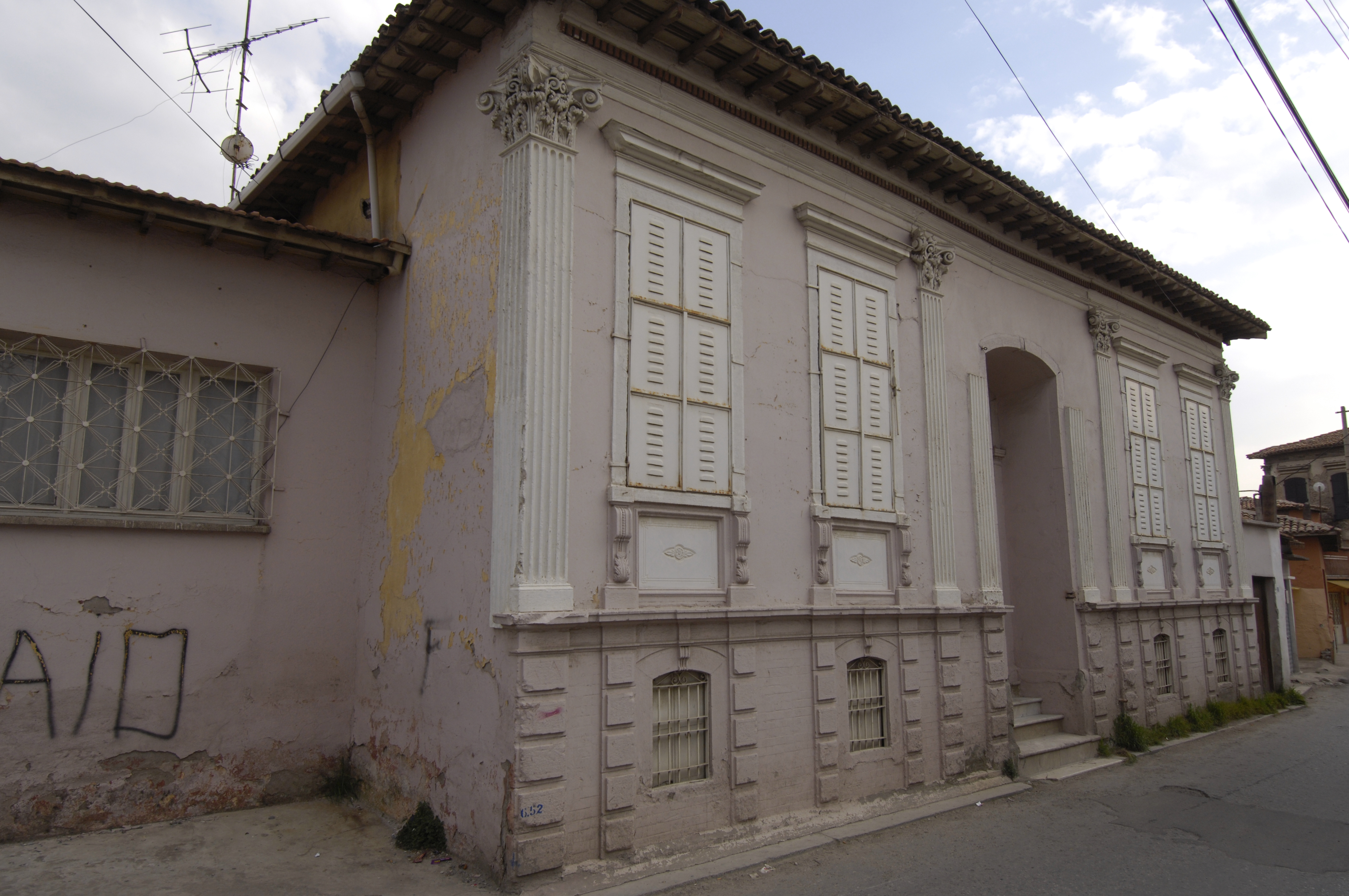
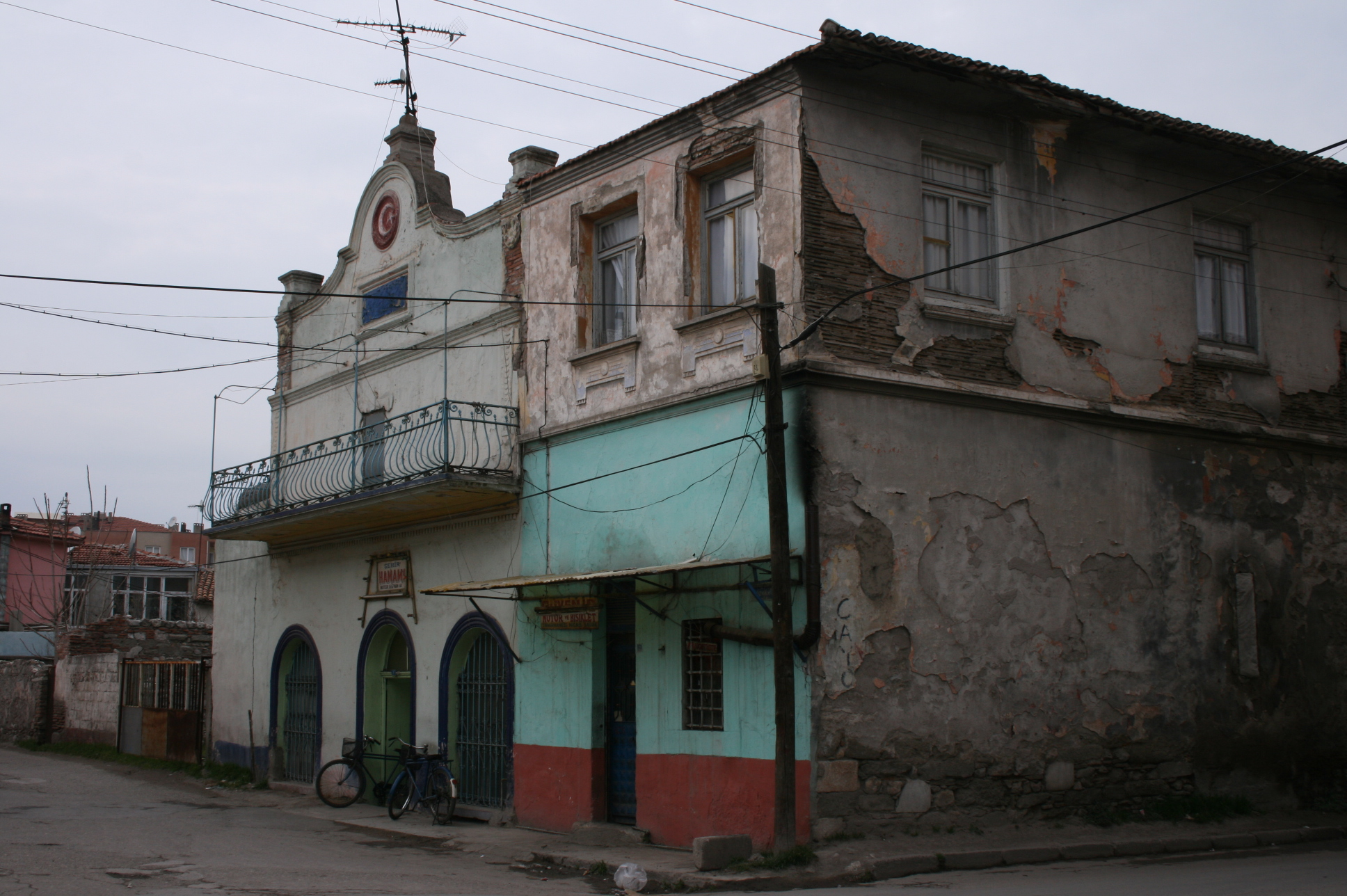
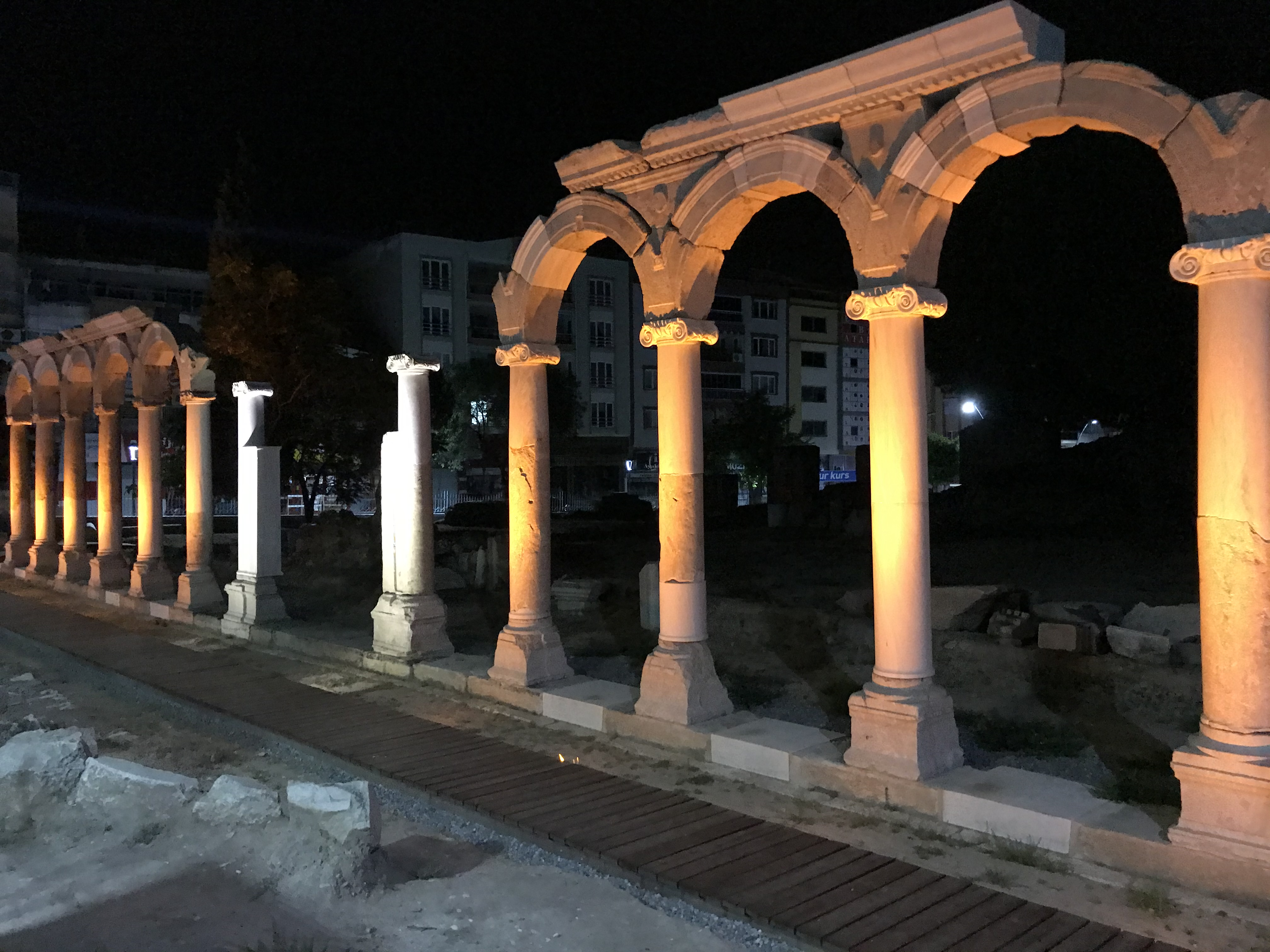
- The Hürriyet neighborhood of Akhisar

- Logo

- Map showing Akhisar District in Manisa Province

- Location within Turkey Location within Turkey Aegean
- Coordinates: 38°55′26″N 27°50′24″E
- Country: Turkey
- Province: Manisa

Government
  - Mayor: Ekrem Kayserili (CHP)
- Area: 1,645 km^{2} (635 sq mi)
- Elevation: 94 m (308 ft)
- Population (2022): 177,419
  - Density: 107.9/km^{2} (279.3/sq mi)
- Time zone: UTC+3 (TRT)
- Postal code: 45200
- Area code: 0236
- Website: www.akhisar.bel.tr

Akhisar (Ottoman Turkish: آق حصار) is a municipality and district of Manisa Province, Turkey. Its area is 1,645 km^{2}, and its population is 177,419 (2022). It is the site of the ancient city of Thyatira.

With archaeological findings that are proving settlements going back to 3000 BC, Akhisar has been a busy trade center with its strategic location at the intersection of important roads during ancient and medieval ages. Akhisar also hosted one of the Seven churches of Asia: Thyatira, which is mentioned in the Bible. Akhisar maintained its importance as a regional trade center during the Ottoman period.

Today's Akhisar is still the trade and business center in its region. Akhisar's name is internationally associated with tobacco. The fertile Akhisar Plain produces about 10% of total Turkish tobacco production. Akhisar's high-quality olives and olive oil are also globally known. Olive, walnut and almond cultivation is among the important agricultural activities of Akhisar.

== History ==
=== Ancient history ===
The town was the most important center in ancient North Lydia. Findings suggest a possible earlier period of pre-eminence under the Hittites. Persian occupation of the region took place around 500 BC. Thyateira was later conquered by Alexander the Great. In later years, Thyateira was captured successively by the Seleucid Empire, the Attalid dynasty of Pergamon, and by Mithridates VI of Pontus, until the Roman Era that started in 80 BC.

In 214 AD, the Roman Emperor Caracalla promoted the town to the status of a regional and administrative center with powers of adjudication (conventus). The city flourished considerably under the Romans and became a large metropolis with 3 gymnasiums. As of the 2nd century AD, Christianity spread in western Anatolia by the actions of apostles like John the Evangelist and Paul. Thyatira is mentioned twice in the New Testament. The Book of Acts refers to a woman of Thyatira named Lydia (Acts 16:14), though the Apostle Paul converted her to Christ in Philippi of Macedonia, not Thyatira. The other occurrence is as one of the Seven Churches of Asia, in the church of which was a woman identified as a prophetess and called "Jezebel" for deceiving some of the Christians there into compromising with idolatry and committing sexual immorality (Revelation 2:18-29).

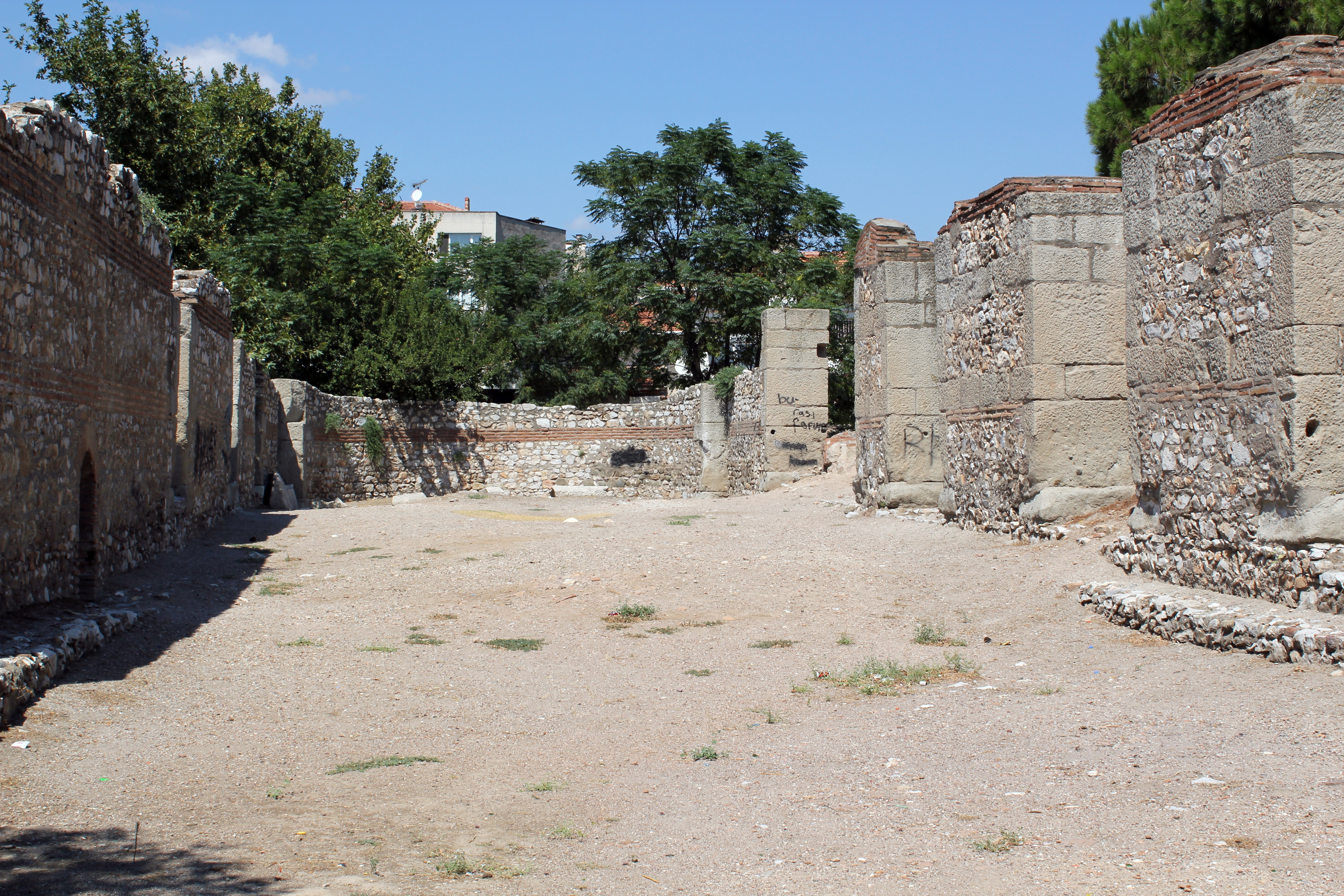
Ruins of the Thyatira church

After the partition of the Roman Empire in 395 and the upcoming of Islam at the beginning of the 7th century, raids by Arabs resulted in great loss of land for Byzantium and the region of Thyatira witnessed many battles between Byzantine and Arab forces.

Thyatira was repeatedly attacked by the Arabs and later by the Turks, however it was rebuilt over the ruins. In the 12th century, a large-scale inflow of Turkish tribes started. Thyatira swayed back and forth between Byzantine and Turkish rulers for two centuries. In the 14th century, Turks under the Anatolian Beylik of Saruhan conquered all Western Anatolian lands and Thyatira went under Turkish rule in 1307. Towards the end of the same century, Akhisar became part of the extending Ottoman Empire. Under Ottoman administration, Thyatira was at first a subdistrict (kaza) in the sanjak (district) of Saruhan (corresponding to present-day Manisa Province) within the larger vilayet (province) of Kütahya.

=== Modern period ===
Akhisar continued its development in the 17th century. However, since the second half of the 16th century, the Celâlî rebellions in the region took the city under its influence. For this reason, the city walls were repaired at the beginning of the 17th century. Due to the Celali rebellions, some of the people in the vicinity settled here and the population of the city increased. As a matter of fact, Evliya Çelebi writes that in 1671 the city had twenty-four neighbourhoods and 2600 houses, most of which were covered with tiles. He also records that there were forty-seven mosques, three hamams, about 1000 shops, one bedesten, ten inns, seven madrasas and twenty-three primary schools, and that it is surrounded by vineyards, gardens and orchards. He also states that there is an old castle ruin on the hill in the middle of the city and that the city was surrounded by walls for fear of the Celâlî named Karayazıcı.

In October 1895 newly resettled Muslims from Bulgaria attacked and massacred members of the local Armenian community. The Saruhan Eyalet was later incorporated into the vilayet of Aydın until the end of the Ottoman Empire in 1922.

During the course of the Greco-Turkish War (1919-22) the Greek Army entered the town on June 5, 1919. Due to the developments of the campaign, which included unrest from the Turkish populace, the Greek forces withdrew on June 10, 1919. Soon after, Greek forces took control of the town during the Greek Summer Offensive on June 22, 1920. The Turkish Nationalist forces captured the town on September 6, 1922, toward the end of the Great Offensive. Following the Turkish capture, an estimated 7,000 local Greeks were killed in Kırtık dere. The remaining were party to the Population exchange between Greece and Turkey. Furthermore, although the local Muslims had sworn on the Quran that they would protect the remaining Armenian community upon the arrival of the Turkish army in town, they instead cooperated with them in plundering and massacring the Armenians.

=== Historical demographics ===
According to demographic statistics of 1917, the district of Akhisar had a total population of 39,157 prior to World War I, with 32,280 being Muslims, 5,877 Greeks, 515 Armenians, and 485 Jews. At the end of 1917, or at the beginning of 1918, the total population of the district was 38,706; of this population, 31,936 were Muslims, 5,782 were Greeks, 506 were Armenians, and 485 were Jews. According to Greek statistics in 1921 during the occupation, the district of Akhisar had a total population of 56,986, with 48,356 being Turks, 7,638 Greeks, 489 Armenians, and 503 Jews.

== Climate ==
Akhisar has a hot-summer Mediterranean climate (Köppen: Csa), with very hot, dry summers, and cool to mild, moderately wet winters.

Climate data for Akhisar (1991–2020)
Month	Jan	Feb	Mar	Apr	May	Jun	Jul	Aug	Sep	Oct	Nov	Dec	Year
Mean daily maximum °C (°F)	11.3 (52.3)	13.3 (55.9)	17.0 (62.6)	22.0 (71.6)	27.9 (82.2)	32.9 (91.2)	35.5 (95.9)	35.7 (96.3)	31.4 (88.5)	25.2 (77.4)	18.1 (64.6)	12.6 (54.7)	23.6 (74.5)
Daily mean °C (°F)	5.9 (42.6)	7.4 (45.3)	10.3 (50.5)	14.7 (58.5)	20.3 (68.5)	25.2 (77.4)	28.0 (82.4)	28.0 (82.4)	23.4 (74.1)	17.9 (64.2)	11.6 (52.9)	7.5 (45.5)	16.7 (62.1)
Mean daily minimum °C (°F)	1.8 (35.2)	2.8 (37.0)	4.7 (40.5)	8.2 (46.8)	13.0 (55.4)	17.6 (63.7)	20.6 (69.1)	20.9 (69.6)	16.4 (61.5)	11.8 (53.2)	6.4 (43.5)	3.5 (38.3)	10.7 (51.3)
Average precipitation mm (inches)	89.09 (3.51)	78.15 (3.08)	63.91 (2.52)	47.35 (1.86)	40.15 (1.58)	14.23 (0.56)	5.18 (0.20)	4.03 (0.16)	17.77 (0.70)	43.51 (1.71)	69.37 (2.73)	80.49 (3.17)	553.23 (21.78)
Average precipitation days (≥ 1.0 mm)	7.8	7.7	6.7	5.5	5.1	2.9	1.3	1.4	2.5	4.3	6.4	8.3	59.9
Average snowy days	1.4	1.2	0.3	0	0	0	0	0	0	0	0	0.6	3.5
Average relative humidity (%)	76.5	72.2	67.3	63.3	58.1	51.8	49.2	51.2	54.7	64.7	73.0	77.4	63.3
Mean monthly sunshine hours	115.9	129.8	185.6	220.8	276.7	312.6	352.4	336.6	286.0	221.6	152.6	105.0	2,695.7
Source 1: NOAA
Source 2: Meteomanz (snowy days 2000–2024)

== Features ==
In ancient times, Thyateira was an important center of activity. It was on the ancient roads from Byzantium to Pergamum, Sardis, and Ephesus. Thyateira was at the center of many small towns and villages which were administratively and politically bound to it. Cloth and pottery trade was the main activity in town. Production of wool, linen, brass goods, and tanning were other commercial activities. The city remained as a center of trade activity for centuries. Akhisar's cloth and cords were reputable in Istanbul markets. Among the other agricultural merchandise were olives, olive oil, water melons, grapes, and raisins.

This high level of economical activity made Akhisar the most important subdistrict within the sanjak of Saruhan. The first Ottoman records about Akhisar date back to the 16th century. These records indicate that Akhisar was a district center which paid 40% more income tax than the seat of the Saruhan Sanjak, present-day Manisa. At the end of the 19th century, urban population had reached 30,000. In the Republican era, Akhisar pursued its development. Many modern avenues and streets were built. In recent years, a new stadium and grass soccer field were built, along with many parks and recreational areas. Many banks, shops and tourist hotels are now lined up along the busy main street (Tahir Un Avenue) which connects the train station to the city center.

An industrial zone specializing in automotive repair and small parts production, along with a number of factories such as olive oil production plants, brick factories, tobacco (cigarette) factories were constructed. The Greater Akhisar Industrial Zone is currently under development. Since the city is located on the State Highway 565 between İzmir and Istanbul—Turkey's two most important ports—Akhisar Industrial Zone offers attractive investment opportunities for both domestic and foreign investors.

Today chess is very popular in Akhisar. Every year during the Caglak Festival hundreds of children participate in chess events. In 2009 the World Youth Under 16 Chess Olympiad was held in Akhisar from September 24 through October 3.

== Historical sites ==
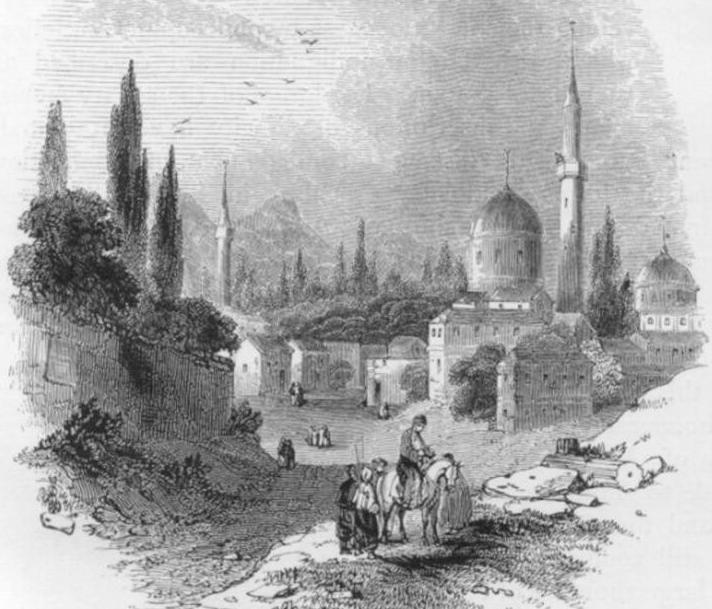
Akhisar in an 1890 engraving

Ancient Akhisar is almost entirely covered by the buildings and streets of the modern town. However, buildings and ruins from ancient times and the Middle Ages can still be seen all over the town. One is very likely to see ancient stones or columnheads in street corners in the older city.

=== Tomb of State Hospital ===
This is a man-made tomb in the city center with Hellenistic ruins. However, some houseware findings on this hill reveal the existence of some primitive settlements dating back to 9000 BC. Archeologists assume that the hill once hosted the acropol of ancient Thyateira. The Byzantine and Turkish names of the city were derived from the white painted towers on this castle. (Turkish name Akhisar, in Turkish: Ak = white + hisar = castle or, Byzantine name Asprokastro, in Greek Aspro=white + kastro=castle). This small hill has hosted the State Hospital since World War II. Today, a Hellenistic tablet and sarcophagus can be seen in the hospital garden.

=== Tepemezari ===
Some ruins of an ancient building complex and colonnaded road can be seen in "Tepemezari" area in downtown. The portico is estimated to have a length of 100 m (330 ft). It possibly connects the entrance of the large ancient building complex to the city acropolis. Tepemezarlığı was subjected to an in depth archaeological excavation between 1969 and 1971. These excavations revealed the walls of a rectangular Roman building along north–south direction with dimensions of about 40 by 10 m (131 by 33 ft). The compound has been arranged into an archaeological park near downtown.

=== Akhisar coins ===
It is generally admitted that money was invented by Lydians in the 7th century BC in western Anatolia. Thyateira, being the most important center in the North ancient Lydia, was definitely one of the first towns where money was used. Towards 200 BC, important trade centers started minting their own coins.

Oldest Thyateira coin is made of bronze and belongs to times when the rule of Pergamon was prevalent. Thyateira coins usually display the figures of Apollo and Artemis on one side and a double sided axe on the other. During 50s AD, Thyateira printed coins bearing figures of Roman emperors, local governors and city administrators. Roman coins also revealed some sports activities and festivals in Thyateira.

Some of the coins found indicate that there was once an economic alliance between Thyateira, Smyrna (İzmir) and Pergamon (Bergama).

=== Falcon Rock ===
The Sahin Kaya or "Falcon Rock" is a big high rock in the Eastern county territory. It hosts some ancient and middle age ruins. This big mass of rock has a very strategic location controlling the Akhisar and Pergamon plains, a large part of the Lydian territories. The location and castle indicate that the settlement was a defensive sentinel station. Access is possible by a tough walk of 3,050 steps up an ancient stairway carved into the rock.

=== Lydian tombs ===
The man-made tombs along modern Akhisar – Gölmarmara road are ancient Lydian graves. These tombs usually have one single grave room.

Similar tombs can also be seen near modern villages of Beyoba, Mecidiye, Süleymanlı and Eroğlu. There are also a number of Lydian and Phrygian graves carved in rock.

=== Ulucami (The Great Mosque) ===
This ancient building was transformed to a mosque in the 15th century. The year of construction is unknown but it is evident that the building was formerly a Byzantine church and possibly an earlier Roman temple. There is even a possibility for the building to be one of the famous Seven Churches of Christianity.

=== Aynali Mosque ===
Aynali Mosque was almost reconstructed in 1958 due to excessive wear. Some ancient columns and building blocks found in the garden suggests that there was a large building of ancient Thyateira in the area. Mosque garden also hosts the finest samples of the Turkish art of stone carving.

=== Zeynelzade Library and Hashoca Mosque ===
The library was constructed in 1798 by Zeynelzade's, a reputable family of Akhisar. The building is located in Hashoca Quarter, close to Hashoca Mosque. According to records of 1805, there were 923 volumes of manuscripts. A modern library with the same name was constructed in the 20th century in another part of the city, serving students and researchers.

=== Jewish graveyard ===
Next to the Reşat Bey Cemetery, there is a Jewish Graveyard of about 673 square meters (7200 ft²). Gravestones with carvings in Hebrew can be seen.

=== Jewish synagogue ===
Right behind the modern Turkish Telecom Directorate Building there is an historical synagogue. Unfortunately, not much remained except its old gate.

=== Kayalıoğlu Jewish school ===
The School of Agriculture built by the Jewish family of Kayalıoglu is still in good shape. The building was built in the beginning of the 20th century. The 3 story building has been recently abandoned. There are orchards and various trees surrounding the building, once used in practical studies. The basement of the building served as a winery. The building and yard occupies an area of about 2 acres (8,100 m^{2}). Other small buildings accompany the old school building.

== Composition ==
There are 110 neighbourhoods in Akhisar District:

- Akçaalan
- Akçeşme
- Akkocalı
- Akselendi
- Arabacıbozköy
- Aşağıdolma
- Atatürk
- Ballıca
- Başlamış
- Bekirler
- Beyoba
- Boyalılar
- Büknüş
- Bünyanosmaniye
- Çamönü
- Çanakçı
- Çıtak
- Çobanhasan
- Çoruk
- Cumhuriyet
- Dağdere
- Dayıoğlu
- Dereköy
- Dingiller
- Doğankaya
- Doğuca
- Dolmadeğirmen
- Durasıl
- Efendi
- Erdelli
- Eroğlu
- Evkafteke
- Göcek
- Gökçeahmet
- Gökçeler
- Hacıibrahimler
- Hacıishak
- Hacıosmanlar
- Hamidiye
- Hamitköy
- Hanpaşa
- Harmandalı
- Hashoca
- Hasköy
- Hürriyet
- İnönü
- İsaca
- Işıkköy
- Kabaağaçkıran
- Kabaşkıran
- Kadıdağı
- Kapaklı
- Karabörklü
- Karaköy
- Karayağcı
- Kavakalan
- Kayalıoğlu
- Kayganlı
- Kethüda
- Kızlaralanı
- Kobaşdere
- Kocakağan
- Kömürcü
- Kulaksızlar
- Kurtulmuş
- Mecidiye
- Medar
- Moralılar
- Musaca
- Musalar
- Muştullar
- Paşa
- Pekmezci
- Pınarcık
- Ragıpbey
- Rahmiye
- Reşatbey
- Sabancılar
- Sağrakçı
- Sakarkaya
- Sarıçalı
- Sarılar
- Sarnıç
- Sazoba
- Seğirdim
- Şehitler
- Selçikli
- Selvili
- Şeyhisa
- Seyitahmet
- Sindelli
- Sırtköy
- Söğütlü
- Süleymanköy
- Süleymanlı
- Sünnetçiler
- Taşçılar
- Topluca
- Tütenli
- Üçavlu
- Ulucami
- Ulupınar
- Yatağan
- Yayakırıldık
- Yaykın
- Yeğenoba
- Yenice
- Yenidoğan
- Zeytinlibağ
- Zeytinliova

== See also ==
- Akhisar Belediyespor (Turkish football club located in the city of Akhisar)
