= Akselendi =

Neighbourhood of Akhisar in Manisa, Turkey

- Neighbourhood
- Location in Turkey Akselendi (Turkey Aegean)
- Coordinates: 38°46′37″N 27°52′42″E
- Country: Turkey
- Province: Manisa
- District: Akhisar
- Population (2024): 1,985
- Time zone: UTC+3 (TRT)

Akselendi is a neighbourhood of the municipality and district of Akhisar, Manisa Province, Turkey. It had a population of 1,985 as of 2024.

== Archaeology ==
Akselendi, located just east of the ancient Lydian town of Hierocaesarea, has yielded several notable archaeological finds. One marble stele discovered at the site preserves a series of dedications made by people named Ammein and Neikomachos. The inscriptions commemorate multiple relatives, including Ariston, Soterichos, and Neikomachos himself, and reflect a multi-generational memorial practice. The term progonos in the inscription suggests that Ariston was likely a step-son of Neikomachos.

Another stele from Akselendi features carved symbols above the text, including a comb, a wreath, and what appear to be mirrors, and commemorates a young woman named Meltines. The text names her parents, Diophantos and Ammias, her grandmother Meltine, and her brothers Menekrates and Diophantos, along with other relatives who participated in the dedication.
