= Ranchi Assembly constituency =

Constituency of the Jharkhand legislative assembly in India

Coordinates: 23.36°N 85.32°E

Ranchi
- Constituency No. 63 for the Jharkhand Legislative Assembly

Constituency details
- Country: India
- Region: East India
- State: Jharkhand
- District: Ranchi
- Lok Sabha constituency: Ranchi
- Established: 2000
- Total electors: 347,064
- Reservation: None

Member of Legislative Assembly
- 6th Jharkhand Legislative Assembly
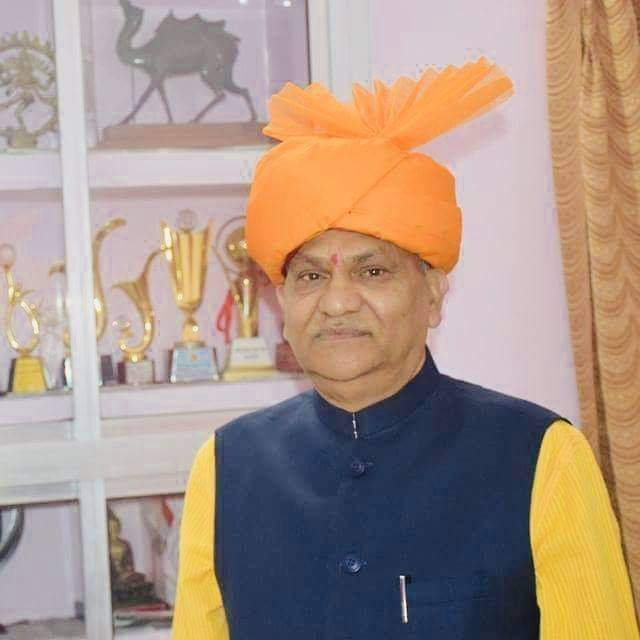
- Incumbent C.P.Singh
- Party: Bhartiya Janta Party
- Elected year: 2024

Ranchi Assembly constituency is an assembly constituency in the Indian state of Jharkhand.

Most successful parties after separate Jharkhand state.
1. BJP (100.0%)

== Members of the Legislative Assembly ==
| Year | Name | Party |
Bihar Legislative Assembly
| 1952 | Ram Ratan Ram (Note: 2 member constituency) | Indian National Congress |
| 1952 | Paul Dayal (Note: 2 member constituency) | Jharkhand Party |
| 1957 | Lal Chintamani Sharan Nath Shahdeo | Independent politician |
| 1977 | Nani Gopal Mitra | Janata Party |
| 1980 | Gyan Rangan | Indian National Congress |
| 1985 | Jai Prakash Gupta | Indian National Congress |
| 1990 | Gulshan Lal Ajmani | Bharatiya Janata Party |
| 1995 | Yashwant Sinha | Bharatiya Janata Party |
| 1996^ | C. P. Singh | Bharatiya Janata Party |
| 2000 | C. P. Singh | Bharatiya Janata Party |
Jharkhand Legislative Assembly
| 2005 | C. P. Singh | Bharatiya Janata Party |
| 2009 | C. P. Singh | Bharatiya Janata Party |
| 2014 | C. P. Singh | Bharatiya Janata Party |
| 2019 | C. P. Singh | Bharatiya Janata Party |
| 2024 | C. P. Singh | Bharatiya Janata Party |

^by-election

== Election results ==
=== Assembly election 2024 ===
2024 Jharkhand Legislative Assembly election: Ranchi
| Party | Candidate | Votes | % | ±% |
|---|---|---|---|---|
| BJP | C. P. Singh | 107,290 | 53.91% | ▲7.13 |
| JMM | Mahua Maji | 85,341 | 42.88% | ▼0.43 |
| NOTA | None of the Above | 900 | 0.45% | ▼0.63 |
| Margin of victory | | 21,949 | 11.03% | ▲7.56 |
| Turnout | | 1,99,027 | 52.51% | ▲3.45 |
| Registered electors | | 3,79,039 | | ▲9.21 |
| BJP hold | | Swing | ▲7.13 | |

=== Assembly election 2019 ===
2019 Jharkhand Legislative Assembly election: Ranchi
| Party | Candidate | Votes | % | ±% |
|---|---|---|---|---|
| BJP | C. P. Singh | 79,646 | 46.77% | ▼17.59 |
| JMM | Mahua Maji | 73,742 | 43.31% | ▲18.51 |
| Independent | Pawan Kumar Sharma | 6,479 | 3.80% | New |
| AJSU | Barsha Gari | 2,603 | 1.53% | New |
| JVM(P) | Sunil Kumar Gupta | 1,973 | 1.16% | ▼0.60 |
| JD(U) | Sanjay Sahay | 895 | 0.53% | New |
| NOTA | None of the Above | 1,845 | 1.08% | New |
| Margin of victory | | 5,904 | 3.47% | ▼36.10 |
| Turnout | | 1,70,276 | 49.06% | ▲0.43 |
| Registered electors | | 3,47,064 | | ▲13.43 |
| BJP hold | | Swing | ▼17.59 | |

=== Assembly election 2014 ===
2014 Jharkhand Legislative Assembly election: Ranchi
| Party | Candidate | Votes | % | ±% |
|---|---|---|---|---|
| BJP | C. P. Singh | 95,760 | 64.36% | ▲7.49 |
| JMM | Mahua Maji | 36,897 | 24.80% | ▲20.35 |
| INC | Surendra Singh | 7,935 | 5.33% | ▼28.24 |
| JVM(P) | Rajiv Ranjan Mishra | 2,622 | 1.76% | New |
| Independent | Rajesh Kumar | 1,057 | 0.71% | New |
| Margin of victory | | 58,863 | 39.56% | ▲16.26 |
| Turnout | | 1,48,784 | 48.63% | ▲15.72 |
| Registered electors | | 3,05,969 | | ▼13.44 |
| BJP hold | | Swing | ▲7.49 | |

=== Assembly election 2009 ===
2009 Jharkhand Legislative Assembly election: Ranchi
| Party | Candidate | Votes | % | ±% |
|---|---|---|---|---|
| BJP | C. P. Singh | 66,161 | 56.87% | ▼23.93 |
| INC | Pradeep Tulsyan | 39,050 | 33.57% | ▲1.31 |
| JMM | Md. Sharfuddin | 5,174 | 4.45% | New |
| AJSU | Rakesh Kumar Singh | 1,968 | 1.69% | New |
| Independent | Jamil Aktar | 922 | 0.79% | New |
| LJP | Krishna Mohan Singh | 603 | 0.52% | New |
| Margin of victory | | 27,111 | 23.31% | ▼5.12 |
| Turnout | | 1,16,328 | 32.91% | ▼27.24 |
| Registered electors | | 3,53,461 | | ▲131.40 |
| BJP hold | | Swing | ▼23.93 | |

=== Assembly election 2005 ===
2005 Jharkhand Legislative Assembly election: Ranchi
| Party | Candidate | Votes | % | ±% |
|---|---|---|---|---|
| BJP | C. P. Singh | 74,239 | 80.80% | ▲25.84 |
| INC | Gopal Prasad Sahu | 48,119 | 32.26% | ▲14.10 |
| RJD | Krishna Yadav | 11,370 | 7.62% | ▼12.08 |
| Independent | Ramesh Singh Alias Ram Singh | 2,588 | 1.74% | New |
| BSP | Mansoor Alam | 1,250 | 0.84% | New |
| Independent | Srimanim Belkhas Kujur | 988 | 0.66% | New |
| AITC | Barun Kumar Saha | 836 | 0.56% | New |
| Margin of victory | | 26,120 | 28.43% | ▼6.83 |
| Turnout | | 91,878 | 60.15% | ▲11.99 |
| Registered electors | | 1,52,751 | | ▼28.37 |
| BJP hold | | Swing | ▲25.84 | |

=== Assembly election 2000 ===
2000 Bihar Legislative Assembly election: Ranchi
| Party | Candidate | Votes | % | ±% |
|---|---|---|---|---|
| BJP | C. P. Singh | 56,445 | 54.96% | New |
| RJD | Jai Singh Yadav | 20,236 | 19.70% | New |
| INC | Pratibha Pandey | 18,651 | 18.16% | New |
| SP | Kumar Varun | 2,339 | 2.28% | New |
| JMM | Navin Chanchal | 1,369 | 1.33% | New |
| Independent | Mansoor Alam | 780 | 0.76% | New |
| Jharkhand Party | Rakesh Kumar | 762 | 0.74% | New |
| Margin of victory | | 36,209 | 35.26% | |
| Turnout | | 1,02,702 | 48.59% | |
| Registered electors | | 2,13,263 | | |
| BJP win (new seat) | | | | |

== See also ==
- Vidhan Sabha
- List of states of India by type of legislature
