= Sarath Assembly constituency =

Sarath
- Constituency No. 14 for the Jharkhand Legislative Assembly

Constituency details
- Country: India
- Region: East India
- State: Jharkhand
- District: Deoghar
- Lok Sabha constituency: Dumka
- Established: 2000
- Total electors: 2,74,163
- Reservation: None

Member of Legislative Assembly
- 6th Jharkhand Legislative Assembly
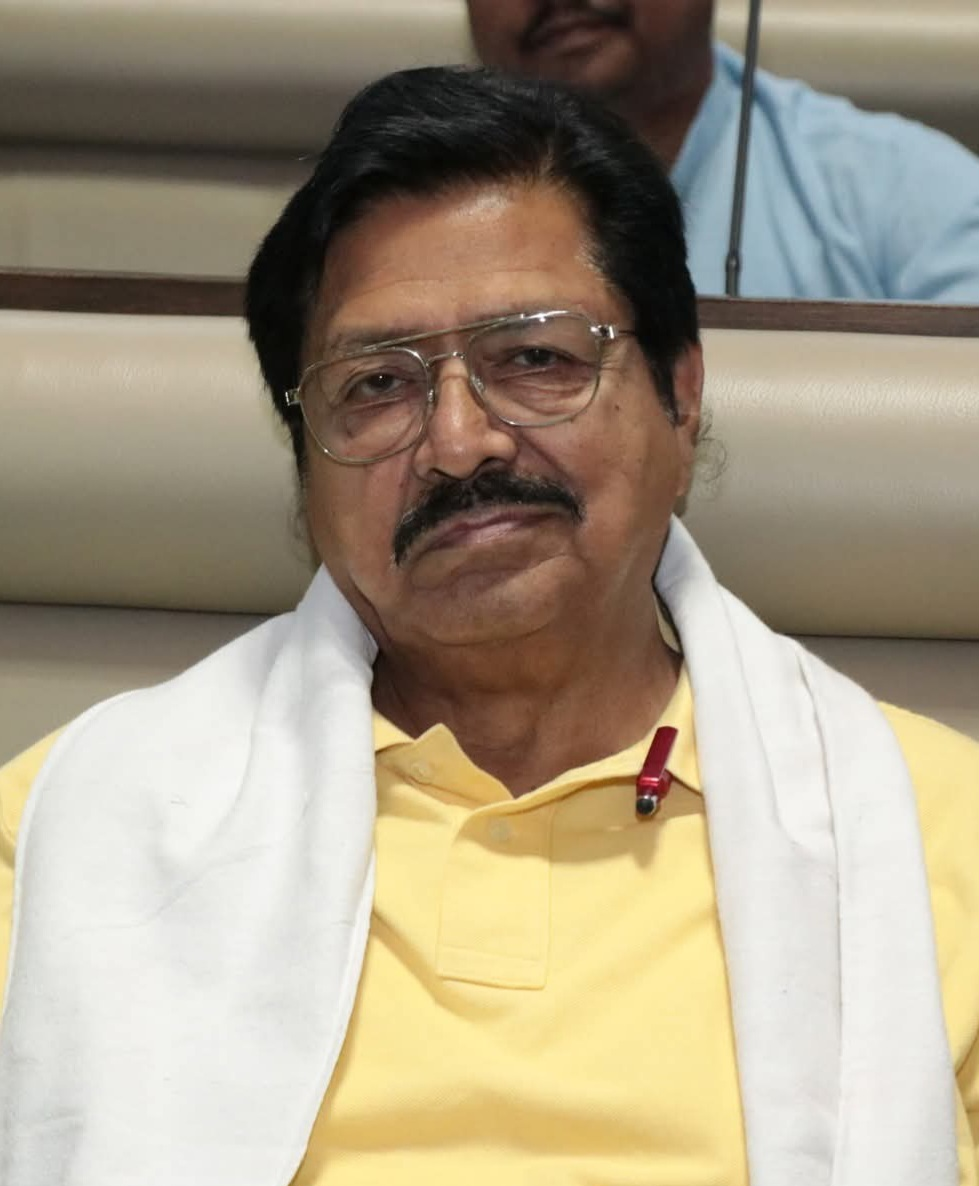
- Incumbent Uday Shankar Singh
- Party: JMM
- Alliance: MGB
- Elected year: 2024

Sarath Assembly constituency is an assembly constituency in the Indian state of Jharkhand.

== Overview ==
Sarath Assembly constituency covers: Sarath and Palojori Police Stations in Deoghar district and Karmatanr, Shahajpur, Pindari, Lakhanpur, Rataniya, Rampurbhitra and Kajra gram panchayats in Jamtara Police Station in Jamtara district.

Sarath Assembly constituency is part of Dumka (Lok Sabha constituency).

== Members of Legislative Assembly ==
Election	Member	Party
Bihar Legislative Assembly
Before 1957: see Madhupur cum Sarath constituency
1957	Badri Narayan Singh	Indian National Congress
1962	Kamdeo Prasad Singh	Praja Socialist Party
1967	N. K. Singh	Indian National Congress
1969	Kamdeo Prasad Singh	Praja Socialist Party
1972	Kamdeo Prasad Singh	Indian National Congress
1977	Chandra Mouleshwar Singh	Janata Party
1980	Ashaya Charan Lal	Jharkhand Mukti Morcha
1985	Uday Shankar Singh	Independent politician
1990	Uday Shankar Singh	Indian National Congress
1995	Uday Shankar Singh	Indian National Congress
2000	Shashank Shekhar Bhokta	Jharkhand Mukti Morcha
Jharkhand Legislative Assembly
2005	Uday Shankar Singh	Rashtriya Janata Dal
2009	Shashank Shekhar Bhokta	Jharkhand Mukti Morcha
2014	Randhir Kumar Singh	Jharkhand Vikas Morcha
2019	Randhir Kumar Singh	Bharatiya Janata Party
2024	Uday Shankar Singh	Jharkhand Mukti Morcha

== Election results ==
=== Assembly election 2024 ===
2024 Jharkhand Legislative Assembly election: Sarath
Party	Candidate	Votes	%	±%
JMM	Uday Shankar Singh	135,219	54.32%	▲42.40
BJP	Randhir Kumar Singh	97,790	39.28%	▼3.22
Independent	Sanjay Pandit	3,306	1.33%	New
Independent	Vicky Kumar Mandal	3,013	1.21%	New
Independent	Santosh Kumar Gupta	2,350	0.94%	New
NOTA	None of the Above	1,582	0.64%	▲0.22
Margin of victory		37,429	15.03%	▲1.61
Turnout		2,48,952	78.61%	▲0.60
Registered electors		3,16,682		▲15.51
JMM gain from BJP		Swing	▲11.82	

=== Assembly election 2019 ===
2019 Jharkhand Legislative Assembly election: Sarath
Party	Candidate	Votes	%	±%
BJP	Randhir Kumar Singh	90,895	42.50%	▲16.21
JVM(P)	Uday Shankar Singh	62,175	29.07%	▼4.71
JMM	Parimal Kumar Singh	25,482	11.91%	▼11.25
AIMIM	Mumtaj Ansari	12,830	6.00%	New
Independent	Pinki Kumari	5,666	2.65%	New
Independent	Israel Ansari	2,912	1.36%	New
Independent	Mamleshwar Prasad Singh	1,656	0.77%	New
NOTA	None of the Above	885	0.41%	▼1.53
Margin of victory		28,720	13.43%	▲5.94
Turnout		2,13,882	78.01%	▲1.25
Registered electors		2,74,163		▲13.34
BJP gain from JVM(P)		Swing	▲8.72	

=== Assembly Election 2014 ===
2014 Jharkhand Legislative Assembly election: Sarath
Party	Candidate	Votes	%	±%
JVM(P)	Randhir Kumar Singh	62,717	33.78%	New
BJP	Uday Shankar Singh	48,816	26.29%	New
JMM	Shashank Shekhar Bhokta	43,013	23.16%	▼6.54
BSP	Md. Yusuf Ansari	9,083	4.89%	New
Jharkhand Vikas Dal	Dr. Suraj Mandal	3,583	1.93%	New
RJD	Surendar Rawani	3,462	1.86%	▼12.65
Independent	Jimoli Soren	2,509	1.35%	New
NOTA	None of the Above	3,618	1.95%	New
Margin of victory		13,901	7.49%	▲0.54
Turnout		1,85,682	76.76%	▲12.71
Registered electors		2,41,885		▲14.25
JVM(P) gain from JMM		Swing	▲4.07	

=== Assembly Election 2009 ===
2009 Jharkhand Legislative Assembly election: Sarath
Party	Candidate	Votes	%	±%
JMM	Shashank Shekhar Bhokta	40,282	29.70%	▼8.69
INC	Uday Shankar Singh	30,862	22.76%	New
Loktantrik Samata Dal	Randhir Kumar Singh	21,721	16.02%	New
RJD	Surendra Rawani	19,684	14.51%	▼35.00
Independent	Parmeshwar Hembrom	7,638	5.63%	New
Independent	Hemlal Rajwar	3,897	2.87%	New
JD(U)	Jai Kumar Singh	2,726	2.01%	▼1.35
Margin of victory		9,420	6.95%	▼4.18
Turnout		1,35,617	64.05%	▲0.93
Registered electors		2,11,723		▼0.23
JMM gain from RJD		Swing	▼19.81	

=== Assembly Election 2005 ===
2005 Jharkhand Legislative Assembly election: Sarath
Party	Candidate	Votes	%	±%
RJD	Uday Shankar Singh	66,335	49.52%	▲43.41
JMM	Shashank Shekhar Bhokta	51,429	38.39%	▼12.73
JD(U)	Satish Chandra Rao	4,495	3.36%	New
Independent	Suman Kumar Singh	3,092	2.31%	New
BSP	Jayant Rao Patel	2,167	1.62%	New
Independent	Bivek Kumar Singh	1,712	1.28%	New
Independent	Rurdranand Raw	791	0.59%	New
Margin of victory		14,906	11.13%	▼0.25
Turnout		1,33,969	63.13%	▼4.54
Registered electors		2,12,216		▲21.37
RJD gain from JMM		Swing	▼1.60	

=== Assembly Election 2000 ===
2000 Bihar Legislative Assembly election: Sarath
Party	Candidate	Votes	%	±%
JMM	Shashank Shekhar Bhokta	60,482	51.12%	New
BJP	Uday Shankar Singh	47,016	39.74%	New
RJD	Sirajuddin Ansari	7,227	6.11%	New
SP	Nirbhay Charan Lal	1,597	1.35%	New
INC	Ashok Roy	1,238	1.05%	New
Margin of victory		13,466	11.38%	
Turnout		1,18,321	68.56%	
Registered electors		1,74,849		
JMM win (new seat)				

== See also ==
- Sarath
- Palojori
- Jamtara block
- Jharkhand Legislative Assembly
- List of states of India by type of legislature
