= Palamut =

Palamut may refer to:

- Palamut (tuna), the Atlantic bonito
- Palamut, former name of Zeytinliova, Manisa Province, Turkey
- Palamut, Tekirdağ, a village in Tekirdağ Province, Turkey
