= Randhir Kumar Singh =

Indian politician

Member of Jharkhand Legislative Assembly
- In office 2014–2024
- Preceded by: Shashank Shekhar Bhokta
- Succeeded by: Uday Shankar Singh
- Constituency: Sarath

Personal details
- Political party: Bharatiya Janata Party (2019-present) Jharkhand Vikas Morcha (till 2019)
- Profession: Politician

Randhir Kumar Singh (born 1974) is an Indian politician from Jharkhand. He is a two time MLA from Sarath Assembly constituency in the Jharkhand Legislative Assembly. He won the 2019 Jharkhand Legislative Assembly election, representing the Bharatiya Janata Party.

== Early life and education ==
Kumar is from Sarath, Deoghar District, Jharkhand. He is the son of Sukdeo Singh. He passed Class 10 in 1989 and later discontinued his studies.

== Career ==
Kumar won from Sarath Assembly constituency representing the Bharatiya Janata Party in the 2019 Jharkhand Legislative Assembly election. He polled 93,785 votes and defeated his nearest rival, Uday Shankar Singh of Jharkhand Vikas Morcha (Prajatantrik), by a margin of 21,328 votes. He became an MLA for the first time winning the 2014 Jharkhand Legislative Assembly election representing Jharkhand Vikas Morcha (Prajatantrik). He defeated Uday Shankar Singh, who contested on BJP ticket, by a margin of 48,816 votes. Earlier in 2009, he lost on Loktantrik Samata Dal ticket, coming third behind JMM and Congress candidates.
