= Palamu =

Palamu may refer to:

- Palamu division, a division of Jharkhand state, India
- Palamu district, a district in Palamu division
- Palamu Fort, forts in the forests of the Palamau Tiger Reserve
- Palamu (Lok Sabha constituency) a parliamentary constituency in Palamu district
- Palamu national park
- Palamu Tiger Reserve

== See also ==
- Palamuru, alternate name for Mahbubnagar, a city in Andhra Pradesh
- Palamuru University, a university in Mahabubnagar, Andhra Pradesh
- Palamulla, a village in Rapla County, Estonia
- Palamuse, a small borough in Jõgeva County, Estonia
- Palamuse Parish, a rural municipality of Estonia
- Palamut (disambiguation)
