= Shashank Shekhar Bhokta =

Indian politician

Member of Jharkhand Legislative Assembly
- In office 2009–2014
- Preceded by: Uday Shankar Singh
- Succeeded by: Randhir Kumar Singh
- Constituency: Sarath

Personal details
- Party: Jharkhand Mukti Morcha
- Profession: Politician

Shashank Shekhar is an Indian politician of Jharkhand Mukti Morcha. Shashank was also chosen as the Jharkhand Legislative Assembly Speaker Jharkhand Mukti Morcha in 2000 and 2013. He represents the Sarath Constituency in the state of Jharkhand.

== Early life and education ==
Shashank Shekhar Bhokta belongs to Chitra district Deoghar Jharkhand. He belongs to a Jamindar family. His graduation in political science came from Patna University. He entered politics in j p movement. He became a member of Congress in year 1982. After long political war he became a member of Bihar legislative assembly in year 2000.
