= Bishrampur block =

Bishrampur
- Block

- Location in jharkhand, India Bishrampur (India)
- Coordinates: 24.263°N 83.924°E
- Country: India
- State: Jharkhand
- District: Palamu
- Block: Bishrampur

Government
  - MLA: Naresh Prashad singh, Rastriya Janta Dal

Population (2001)
  - Total: 146,139

Languages
  - Official: Hindi
- Time zone: UTC+5:30 (IST)
- PIN: 822132
- Vehicle registration: JH
- Website: http://palamu.nic.in/bishrampur.html

Bishrampur block is one of the administrative community development block of Palamu district, Jharkhand state, India. According to census (2001), the block has 15,419 households with aggregate population of 133,862. The block has 96 villages.

== About Bishrampur Palamu Jharkhand ==
Bishrampur Taluka/Block, close to Medininager Palamu, is located 42 km from Medininagar (Daltonganj). Bishrampur has a separate Vidhan Sabha constituency. Bishrampur is located in north west of daltonganj. It is connected via NH-98. It is surrounded by mountains on every side. It is covered by Vodafone, Airtel, Uninor, Reliance, BSNL, Aircel, Idea, Airtel 3G, and other cellular networks.

== Demographics ==
Religion in Bishrampur block (2011)
| Religion | Percent |
| Hinduism | 86.02% |
| Islam | 13.75% |
| Other or not stated | 0.23% |

At the time of the 2011 census, Bishrampur block had a population of 104,983. Bishrampur block had a sex ratio of 923 females per 1000 males and a literacy rate of 67.98%: 79.30% for males and 55.65% for females. 16,996 (16.19%) were under 7 years of age. 42,925 (40.89%) lived in urban areas. Scheduled Castes and Scheduled Tribes were 29,531 (28.13%) and 3,375 (3.21%) of the population, respectively.

Languages of Bishrampur block (2011)
1. Hindi (85.21%)
2. Magahi (7.32%)
3. Urdu (6.83%)
4. Others (0.64%)

== See also ==
- Palamu Lok Sabha constituency
- Jharkhand Legislative Assembly
- Jharkhand
- Palamu
