= Zeytinliova =

Zeytinliova Palamut, Yayaköy
- Neighbourhood
- Location in Turkey Zeytinliova (Turkey Aegean)
- Coordinates: 38°59′N 27°41′E
- Country: Turkey
- Province: Manisa
- District: Akhisar
- Elevation: 250 m (820 ft)
- Population (2022): 2,750
- Time zone: UTC+3 (TRT)
- Postal code: 45200
- Area code: 0236

Zeytinliova (formerly: Palamut, Yayaköy) is a neighbourhood of the municipality and district of Akhisar, Manisa Province, Turkey. Its population is 2,750 (2022). Before the 2013 reorganisation, it was a town (belde). It is 18 km from the town of Akhisar.

The town has a Mediterranean climate with summers that are hot and dry, and winters that are mild and rainy. Its elevation ranges from 235 m. to 300 m. The economy is primarily agricultural and the main commercial crop is olives, notably the domat. In Fevzi Pasha there is a park in the national forest.
