= Uday Shankar Singh =

Indian politician

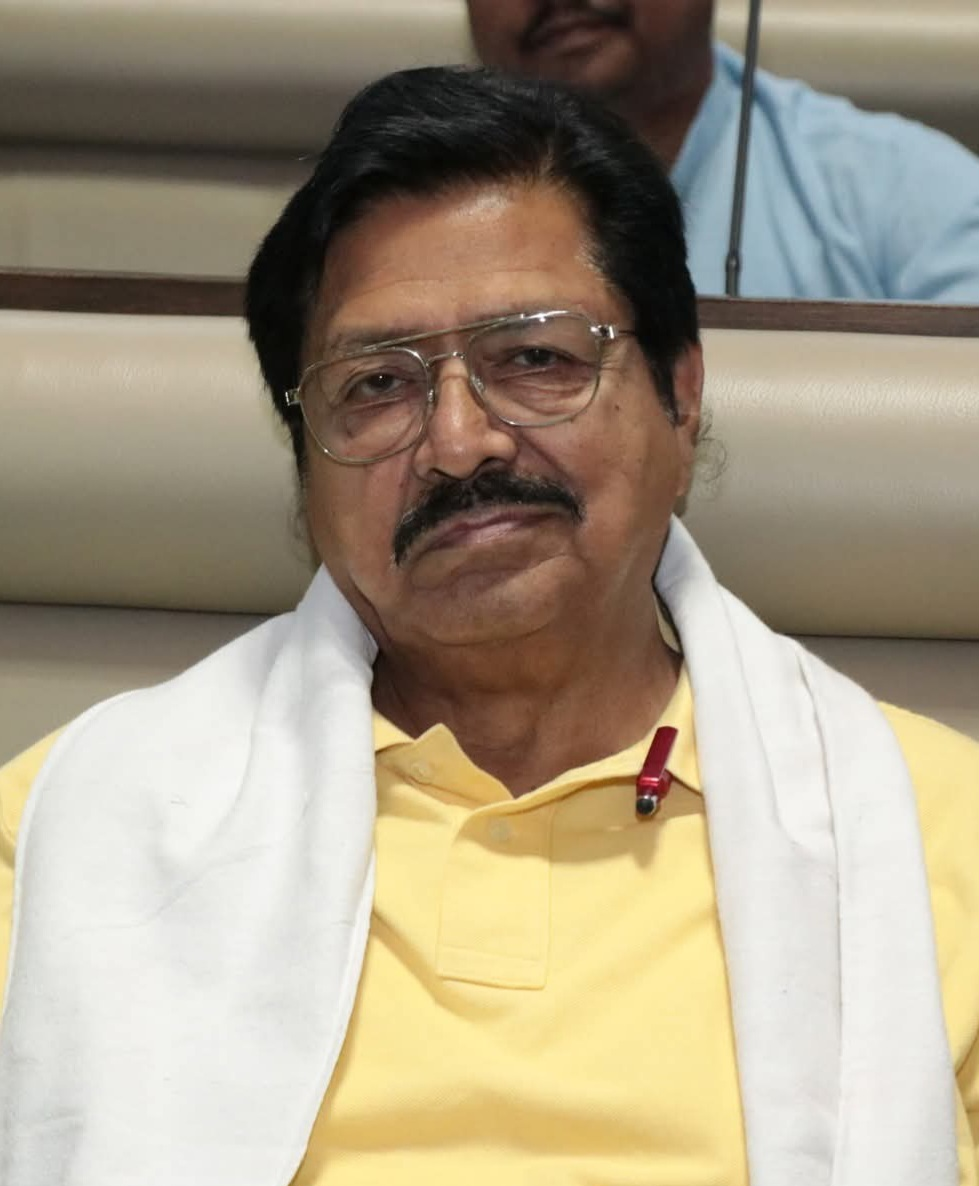

Member of the Jharkhand Legislative Assembly
- Incumbent
- Assumed office 23 November 2024
- Preceded by: Randhir Kumar Singh
- Constituency: Sarath
- In office 2005–2009
- In office 1985–2000

Personal details
- Party: Jharkhand Mukti Morcha
- Profession: Politician

Uday Shankar Singh ( Chunna Singh/ Chunna Babu) is an Indian politician from Jharkhand. He is a member of the Jharkhand Legislative Assembly from 2024, representing Sarath Assembly constituency as a member of the Jharkhand Mukti Morcha. He is a five time MLA from the Sarath Vidhan Sabha constituency. He won elections in 1985, 1990, 1995, 2005, and 2025.

== See also ==
- List of chief ministers of Jharkhand
- Jharkhand Legislative Assembly
